= List of civil parishes in Worcestershire =

This is a list of civil parishes in the ceremonial county of Worcestershire, England. There are 195 civil parishes.

== Bromsgrove ==
Two separate parts of the former Bromsgrove Urban District are unparished.

Name	Constituent villages	Notes
Alvechurch	Alvechurch	^{2}
Barnt Green	Barnt Green	^{2} ^{3}
Belbroughton	Belbroughton	^{2}
Bentley Pauncefoot	Bank's Green, Upper Bentley	^{2}
Beoley	Beoley	^{2}
Bournheath	Bournheath	^{3}
Catshill and North Marlbrook	Catshill, Marlbrook	^{3}
Clent	Clent	^{2}
Cofton Hackett	Cofton Hackett	^{2}
Dodford with Grafton	Dodford, Grafton	^{2}
Finstall	Finstall	^{3}
Frankley	Frankley	^{2}
Hagley	Hagley	^{2}
Hunnington	Hunnington	^{2}
Lickey and Blackwell	Lickey, Blackwell	^{3}
Romsley	Romsley	^{2}
Stoke	Stoke Heath, Stoke Prior	^{2}
Tutnall and Cobley	Tutnall, Cobley	^{2}
Wythall	Wythall, Drakes Cross, Hollywood	^{2}

== Malvern Hills ==
The whole of the district is parished.

Name	Constituent villages	Notes
Abberley	Abberley	^{11}
Alfrick	Alfrick	^{11}
Astley and Dunley	Astley, Dunley	^{11}
Bayton	Bayton	^{15}
Berrow	Berrow	^{16}
Birtsmorton	Birtsmorton	^{16}
Bockleton	Bockleton	^{15}
Bransford	Bransford	^{11}
Broadwas	Broadwas	^{11}
Bushley	Bushley	^{16}
Castlemorton	Castlemorton	^{16}
Clifton upon Teme	Clifton upon Teme	^{11}
Cotheridge	Cotheridge	^{11}
Croome D'Abitot	Croome D'Abitot	^{16}
Doddenham	Doddenham	^{11}
Earl's Croome	Earl's Croome	^{16}
Eastham	Eastham	^{15}
Eldersfield	Eldersfield	^{16}
Great Witley	Great Witley	^{11}
Grimley	Grimley	^{11}
Guarlford	Guarlford	^{16}
Hallow	Hallow	^{11}
Hanley	Hanley Child, Hanley William	^{15}
Hanley Castle	Hanley Castle, Hanley Swan	^{16}
Hill Croome	Hill Croome	^{16}
Hillhampton	Hillhampton	^{11}
Holdfast	Holdfast	^{16}
Holt	Holt	^{11}
Kempsey	Kempsey	^{16}
Kenswick	Kenswick	^{11}
Knighton on Teme	Knighton on Teme	^{15}
Knightwick	Knightwick	^{11}
Kyre	Kyre	^{15}
Leigh	Leigh, Leigh Sinton	^{11}
Lindridge	Lindridge	^{15}
Little Malvern	Little Malvern	^{16}
Little Witley	Little Witley	^{11}
Longdon	Longdon	^{16}
Lower Broadheath	Broadheath	^{11}
Lower Sapey	Lower Sapey	^{11}
Lulsley	Lulsley	^{11}
Madresfield	Madresfield	^{16}
Malvern (town)	Great Malvern, Malvern Link	^{10}
Malvern Wells	Malvern Wells, Wyche	^{10}
Mamble	Mamble	^{15}
Martley	Martley	^{11}
Newland	Newland	^{16}
Pendock	Pendock	^{16}
Pensax	Pensax	^{15}
Powick	Powick	^{16}
Queenhill	Queenhill	^{16}
Ripple	Ripple	^{16}
Rochford	Rochford	^{15}
Rushwick	Rushwick	^{11}
Severn Stoke	Severn Stoke	^{16}
Shelsley Beauchamp	Shelsley Beauchamp	^{11}
Shelsley Kings	Shelsley Kings	^{11}
Shelsley Walsh	Shelsley Walsh	^{11}
Shrawley	Shrawley	^{11}
Stanford with Orleton	Stanford	^{15}
Stockton on Teme	Stockton on Teme	^{15}
Stoke Bliss	Stoke Bliss	^{15}
Suckley	Suckley	^{11}
Tenbury (town)	Tenbury Wells	^{15}
Upton-upon-Severn (town)	Upton upon Severn	^{16}
Welland	Welland	^{16}
West Malvern	West Malvern	^{10}
Wichenford	Wichenford	^{11}

== Redditch ==
Part of the former Redditch Urban District is unparished.

Name	Constituent villages	Notes
Feckenham	Feckenham	^{13}

== Worcester ==
The former Worcester County Borough is unparished.

Name	Constituent villages	Notes
St Peter the Great County	St Peter the Great	^{12}
Warndon	Warndon	^{5}

== Wychavon ==
The whole of the district is parished.

Name	Constituent villages	Notes
Abberton	Abberton	^{12}
Abbots Morton	Abbots Morton	^{7}
Aldington	Aldington	^{7}
Ashton under Hill	Ashton under Hill	^{7}
Aston Somerville	Aston Somerville	^{7}
Badsey	Badsey	^{7}
Beckford	Beckford	^{7}
Besford	Besford	^{12}
Bickmarsh	Bickmarsh	^{7}
Birlingham	Birlingham	^{12}
Bishampton	Bishampton	^{12}
Bredicot	Bredicot	^{12}
Bredon	Bredon	^{12}
Bredon's Norton	Bredon's Norton	^{12}
Bretforton	Bretforton	^{7}
Bricklehampton	Bricklehampton	^{12}
Broadway	Broadway	^{7}
Broughton Hackett	Broughton Hackett	^{12}
Charlton	Charlton	^{12}
Childswickham	Childswickham	^{7}
Churchill	Churchill	^{12}
Cleeve Prior	Cleeve Prior	^{7}
Conderton	Conderton	^{7}
Cookhill	Cookhill	^{7}
Cropthorne	Cropthorne	^{12}
Crowle	Crowle	^{5}
Defford	Defford	^{12}
Dodderhill	Dodderhill	^{5}
Dormston	Dormston	^{12}
Doverdale	Doverdale	^{5}
Drakes Broughton and Wadborough	Drakes Broughton, Wadborough	^{12}
Droitwich Spa (town)	Droitwich Spa	^{4}
Eckington	Eckington	^{12}
Elmbridge	Elmbridge	^{5}
Elmley Castle	Elmley Castle	^{12}
Elmley Lovett	Elmley Lovett	^{5}
Evesham (town)	Evesham	^{6}
Fladbury	Fladbury	^{12}
Flyford Flavell	Flyford Flavell	^{12}
Grafton Flyford	Grafton Flyford	^{12}
Great Comberton	Great Comberton	^{12}
Hadzor	Hadzor	^{5}
Hampton Lovett	Hampton Lovett	^{5}
Hanbury	Hanbury	^{5}
Hartlebury	Hartlebury	^{5}
Harvington	Harvington	^{7}
Hill and Moor	Lower Moor, Upper Moor, Hill, Hill Furze	^{12}
Himbleton	Himbleton	^{5}
Hindlip	Hindlip	^{5}
Hinton on the Green	Hinton on the Green	^{7}
Honeybourne	Honeybourne	^{7}
Huddington	Huddington	^{5}
Inkberrow	Inkberrow	^{7}
Kemerton	Kemerton	^{7}
Kington	Kington	^{12}
Little Comberton	Little Comberton	^{12}
Martin Hussingtree	Martin Hussingtree	^{5}
Naunton Beauchamp	Naunton Beauchamp	^{12}
Netherton	Netherton	^{12}
North and Middle Littleton	North and Middle Littleton	^{7}
North Claines	Claines, Fernhill Heath, Hawford, Bevere	^{5}
North Piddle	North Piddle	^{12}
Norton and Lenchwick	Norton, Lenchwick	^{7}
Norton-juxta-Kempsey	Norton, Littleworth	^{12}
Oddingley	Oddingley	^{5}
Offenham	Offenham	^{7}
Ombersley	Ombersley	^{5}
Overbury	Overbury	^{7}
Pebworth	Pebworth	^{7}
Peopleton	Peopleton	^{12}
Pershore (town)	Pershore	^{12}
Pinvin	Pinvin	^{12}
Pirton	Pirton	^{12}
Rous Lench	Rous Lench	^{7}
Salwarpe	Salwarpe	^{5}
Sedgeberrow	Sedgeberrow	^{7}
South Lenches	Church Lench, Ab Lench, Atch Lench, Sheriffs Lench	^{7}
South Littleton	South Littleton	^{7}
Spetchley	Spetchley	^{12}
Stock and Bradley	Stock Green, Bradley Green	^{5}
Stoulton	Stoulton	^{12}
Strensham	Strensham	^{12}
Throckmorton	Throckmorton	^{12}
Tibberton	Tibberton	^{5}
Upton Snodsbury	Upton Snodsbury	^{12}
Upton Warren	Upton Warren	^{5}
Westwood	Westwood	^{5}
White Ladies Aston	White Ladies Aston	^{12}
Whittington	Whittington	^{12}
Wick	Wick	^{12}
Wickhamford	Wickhamford	^{7}
Wyre Piddle	Wyre Piddle	^{12}

== Wyre Forest ==
- Bewdley (town)^{1}
- Broome ^{9}
- Chaddesley Corbett ^{9}
- Churchill and Blakedown ^{9}
- Kidderminster (town)^{8}
- Kidderminster Foreign ^{9}
- Ribbesford ^{9}
- Rock ^{9}
- Rushock ^{9}
- Stone ^{9}
- Stourport-on-Severn (town)^{14}
- Upper Arley ^{9}
- Wolverley and Cookley ^{9}

== Notes ==
1. Formerly Bewdley Municipal Borough
2. Formerly Bromsgrove Rural District
3. Formerly Bromsgrove Urban District
4. Formerly Droitwich Municipal Borough
5. Formerly Droitwich Rural District
6. Formerly Evesham Municipal Borough
7. Formerly Evesham Rural District
8. Formerly Kidderminster Municipal Borough
9. Formerly Kidderminster Rural District
10. Formerly Malvern Urban District
11. Formerly Martley Rural District
12. Formerly Pershore Rural District
13. Formerly Redditch Urban District
14. Formerly Stourport on Severn Urban District
15. Formerly Tenbury Rural District
16. Formerly Upton upon Severn Rural District
17. Formerly Worcester County Borough

== See also ==
- List of civil parishes in England
