= William Hopkins (architect) =

British architect (1820–1901)

- Born: 1820
- Died: 1901 (aged 80–81)
- Occupation: Architect
- Buildings: Saints Philip and James Parish church, Hallow, Worcestershire

William Jeffrey Hopkins (1820–1901) was a British architect.

== Career ==
One of Hopkins' earliest works, the Public Hall in Worcester (1848–49), was Italianate. Most of his work thereafter was of the Gothic Revival. For many years he was the Worcester Diocesan Architect, and as such he mostly built or rebuilt Church of England parish churches in Worcestershire.

== Works ==
- Public Hall, Worcester, 1848–49 (demolished circa 1968)
- St. Martin's parish church, Worcester: east window, 1855–62
- St. Barnabas' parish church, Drakes Broughton, Worcestershire, 1857
- Cow Honeybourne parish church, Honeybourne, Worcestershire, 1861–63
- Holy Trinity parish church, Shrub Hill, Worcester, 1863 (demolished 1965)
- St. James' parish church, Hindlip, Worcestershire: rebuilding, 1864
- St. John the Baptist parish church, Bradley, Worcestershire, 1864–65
- St.Nicholas' parish church, Worcester: restoration, 1867
- Saints Philip and James parish church, Hallow, Worcestershire, 1867–69
- Bohun Court, Hallow, Worcestershire, 1860s (demolished 1925)
- St. James' parish church, Churchill, Worcestershire, 1868
- St. Peter ad Vincula parish church, Tibberton, Worcestershire, 1868
- St. Paul's parish church, Blackheath, Birmingham, 1869
- Bromsgrove School, Bromsgrove, Worcestershire: enlarged chapel, 1869
- St. Mary's parish church, Icomb, Gloucestershire: restoration, 1871
- St. Nicholas' parish church, King's Norton, Birmingham: restoration, 1871
- St. Kenelm's parish church, Upper Snodsbury, Worcestershire: rebuilt church, 1873–74
- St. James' parish church, Norton-by-Kempsey: restoration (with Ewan Christian), 1874–75
- St. John the Baptist parish church, Grafton Flyford, Worcestershire: rebuilding, 1875
- St. John the Baptist parish church, Suckley, Worcestershire: rebuilt church, 1878–79
- All Saints' parish church, Wilden, Worcestershire, 1880
- St. Peter's parish church, Besford, Worcestershire: restoration, 1880–81
- St. James' parish church, Kington, Worcestershire: rebuilt chancel, 1881
- St. Eadburga's parish church, Abberton, Worcestershire, 1881–82
- St. Peter's parish church, Flyford Flavell, Worcestershire: rebuilding, 1883
- Saints Mathias and George parish church, Astwood Bank, Worcestershire, 1884
- St. Bartholomew's parish church, Naunton Beauchamp, Worcestershire: rebuilding, 1897

== Sources and further reading ==
- Brodie, Antonia; Felstead, Alison; Franklin, Jonathan; Pinfield, Leslie; Oldfield, Jane, eds. (2001). Directory of British Architects 1834–1914, A–K. London & New York: Continuum. ISBN 0-8264-5513-1.
- Pevsner, Nikolaus (1968). Worcestershire. The Buildings of England. Harmondsworth: Penguin Books.
- Pevsner, Nikolaus; Wedgwood, Alexandra (1966). Warwickshire. The Buildings of England. Harmondsworth: Penguin Books. p. 188.
- Verey, David (1970). Gloucestershire: The Cotswolds. The Buildings of England. Vol. I. Harmondsworth: Penguin Books. p. 280. ISBN 0-14-071040-X.
