= Badsey Brook =

Stream in Worcestershire, England

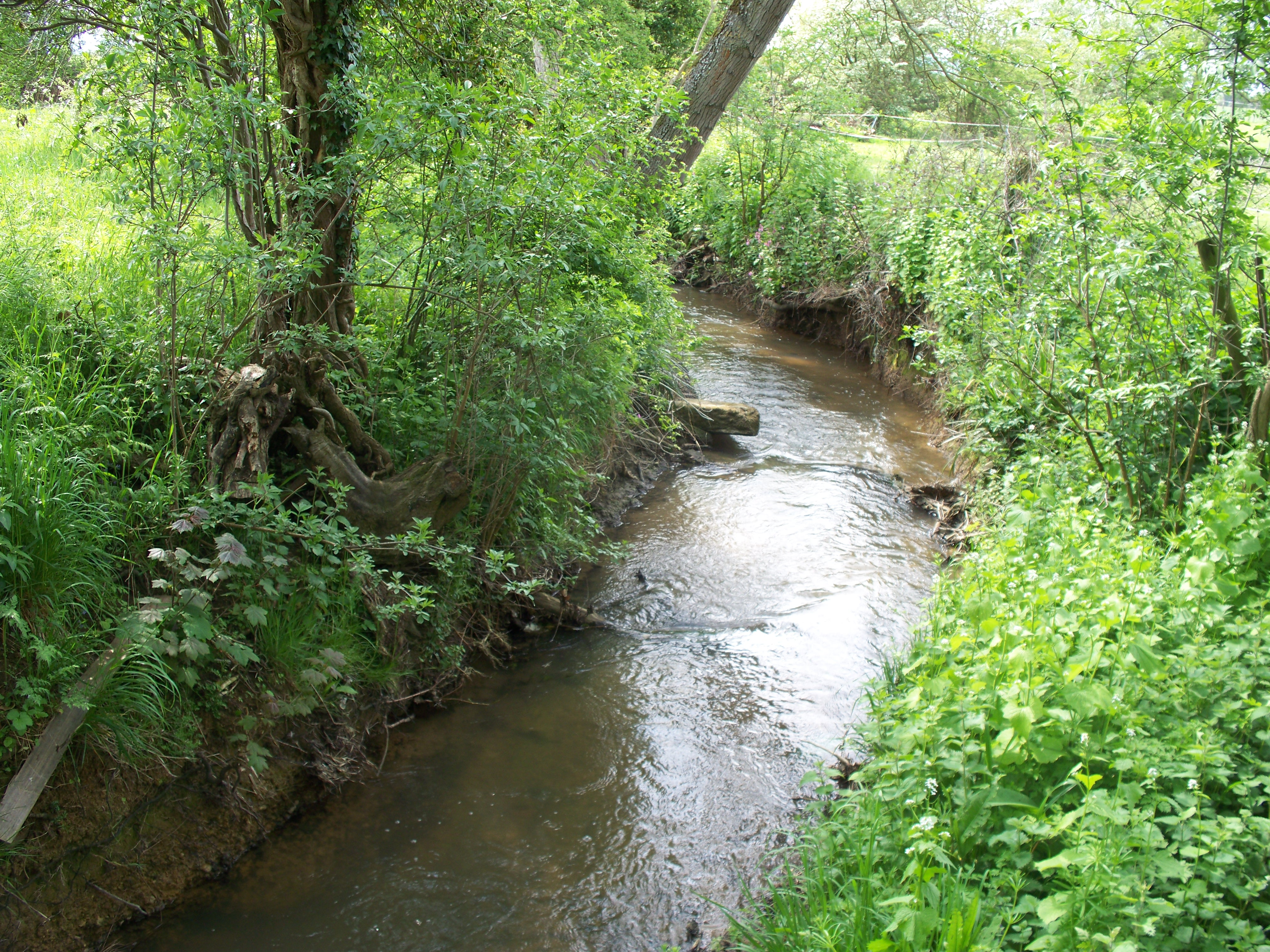
- Badsey Brook near Childswickham

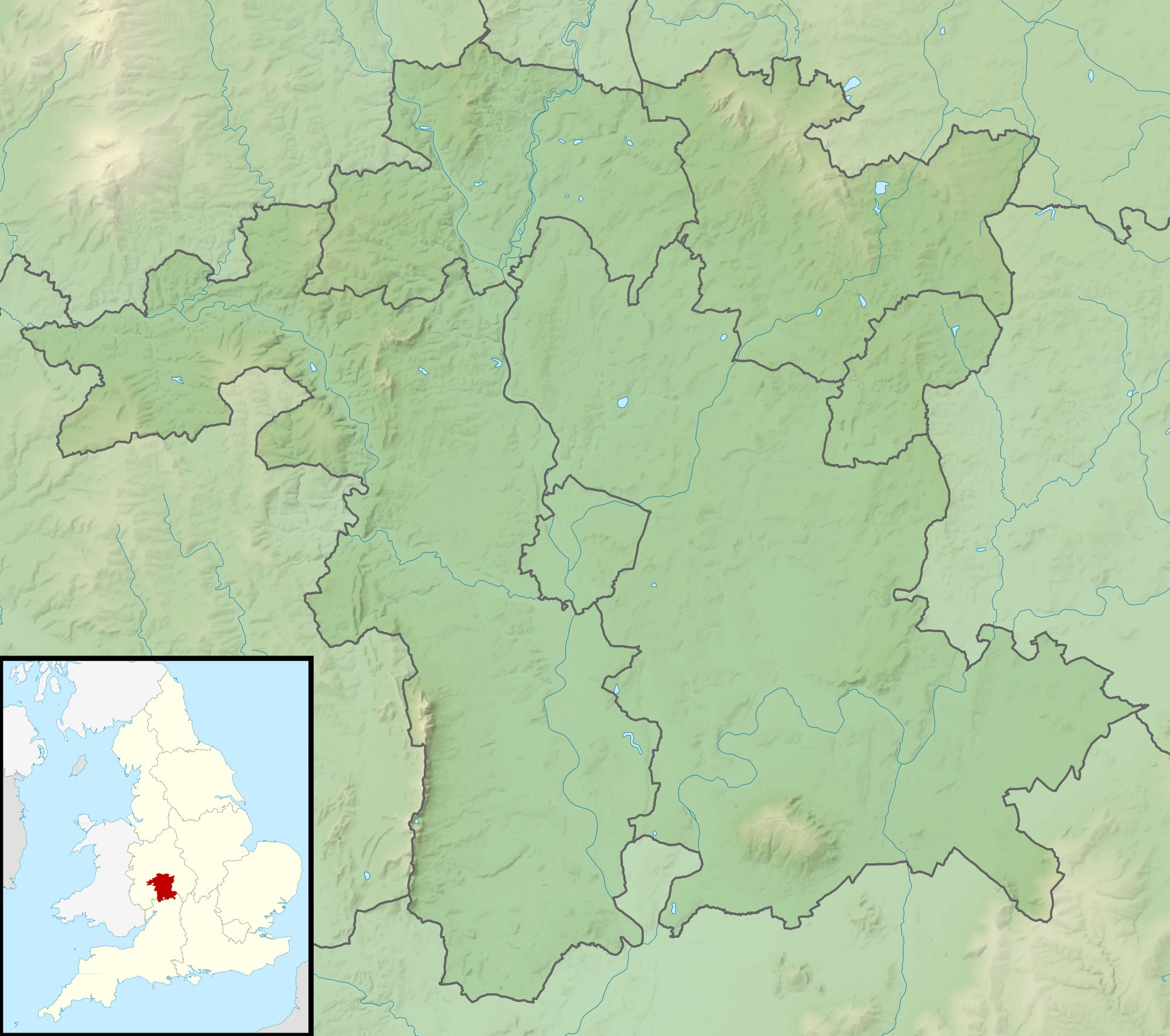
- Location within Worcestershire

Location
- Country: England
- Counties: Worcestershire

Physical characteristics
- Mouth
  - location: River Avon
  - coordinates: 52.1072°N 1.9287°W
- Basin size: 102 km^{2} (39 sq mi)
- Discharge
  - location: Offenham
  - average: 0.68 m^{3}/s (24 cu ft/s)

The Badsey Brook, also known as the Broadway Brook, is a small brook that flows through Worcestershire, England. It is a lower tributary of the River Avon, which it joins near Offenham upstream of Evesham. Its principal tributary is the Bretforton Brook.

== Course ==
It rises on the flanks of the Cotswold Hills near Snowshill, and flows in a north-westerly direction through Broadway, and Childswickham before turning north and passing Wickhamford where it is crossed by the A44. The brook is then joined by a couple of minor tributaries, before flowing through Badsey then Aldington where it meets the Bretforton Brook. Turning north-west, it flows past Offenham Cross where it is bridged by the B5410, to join the Warwickshire Avon south of Offenham.

== Hydrology ==
The flow of the Badsey Brook has been measured, in its lower reaches at Offenham since 1968. The gauging station was initially a flume, later changed to a weir. This long-term record shows that the catchment of 96 square kilometres (37 sq mi) to the gauging station yielded an average flow of 0.68 cubic metres per second (24 cu ft/s). The highest river level recorded at the station occurred on 21 July 2007, with a height of 3.65 metres (12.0 ft), and the second highest of 3.14 metres (10.3 ft) in April 1998. The catchment upstream of the station has an average annual rainfall of 653 millimetres (25.7 in) and a maximum altitude of 317 metres (1,040 ft) at Broadway Hill near the source of the brook. Land use within the basin is mainly agricultural, consisting of arable, horticulture and grassland with some woodland.

== Floods ==
The Badsey Brook along with the Avon and its other tributaries was badly affected by the 2007 floods. To help prevent flooding in the future a flood storage area is planned to be constructed in Broadway.

== See also ==
- List of rivers of England
