= Tibberton =

Tibberton may refer to:

- Tibberton, Gloucestershire
- Tibberton, Shropshire
- Tibberton, Worcestershire
