= Hill and Moor =

Civil parish in Worcestershire, England

Coordinates: 52.125795°N 2.032557°W

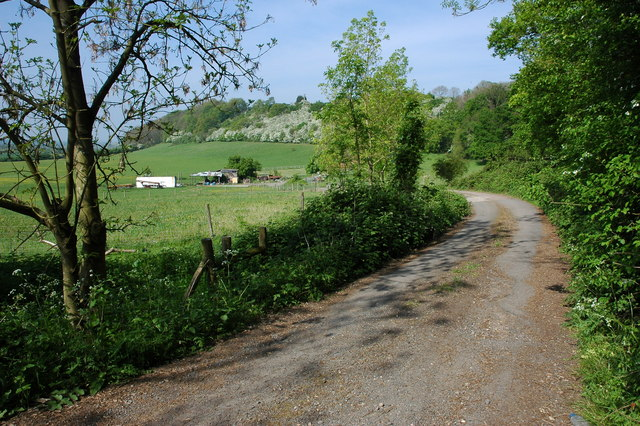
Badger's Hill, Hill and Moor

Hill and Moor is a civil parish in the Wychavon district of Worcestershire, England. It includes the village Lower Moor and the hamlets of Upper Moor, Hill and Hill Furze.
