= Stock and Bradley =

Civil parish in Worcestershire, England

Coordinates: 52.248°N 2.023°W

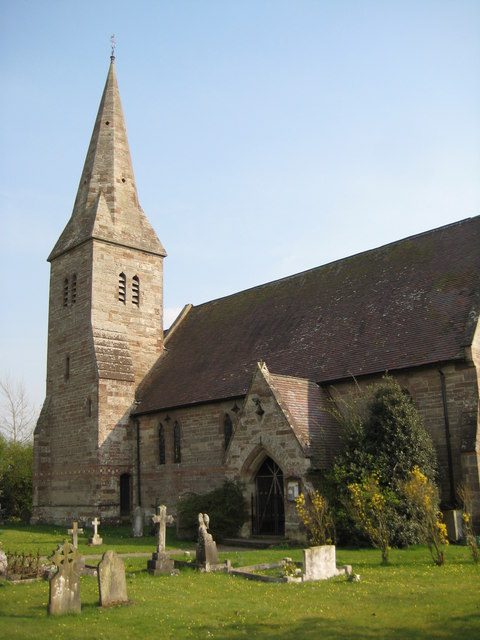
- Church of St John the Baptist in 2010

- Location within Worcestershire
- Population: 327 (2021)
- OS grid reference: SO986602
- District: Wychavon
- Shire county: Worcestershire
- Region: West Midlands
- Country: England
- Sovereign state: United Kingdom
- Post town: REDDITCH
- Postcode district: B96
- Police: West Mercia
- Fire: Hereford and Worcester
- Ambulance: West Midlands
- UK Parliament: Redditch

Stock and Bradley is a civil parish in Wychavon district, Worcestershire, England. The parish consists of the rural villages of Stock Green and Bradley Green. Its population was recorded as 327 at the 2021 UK census.

== History ==
At the 1861 census, the population of the parish was recorded as 310. During this period, the majority of its inhabitants were employed in the agriculture and glovemaking industries. By the 1950s, the population had been in decline, reaching a low point of around 200 inhabitants. However, the population began to slowly increase, eventually reaching today's figure of approximately 300 people.

The parish contains the local Anglican Church of St John the Baptist. It received Grade II listed building status in 1985 and is located between near Bradley Green.

== Geography ==
The parish comprises the villages of Stock Green and Bradley Green and the roads between them, spanning an area of about 1,140 acres. The area is predominately rural; the parish's neighbouring villages include Feckenham to the east, Dormston and Inkberrow to the south and Earls Common to the west. It is situated about 4.7 miles south-west from the centre of the nearest town, Redditch, and 8.5 miles north-east of the centre of Worcester.

== Politics ==
Politically, the parish is part of the non-metropolitan district of Wychavon and the non-metropolitan/ceremonial county of Worcestershire, administered by Worcestershire County Council. It also lies within the Redditch parliament constituency and is currently represented by the Labour Party MP Chris Bloore in the House of Commons.

== Demographics ==
At the 2021 census, the parish population was 327, an increase from 288 at the 2011 census. In 2021, 98.5% of the population belonged to the White ethnic group, with 94.8% also being born in the United Kingdom. The largest religious group was Christians, who accounted for 74.9% of the population, higher than the national average.
