= Bradley Green, Worcestershire =

Village in Worcestershire, England

Coordinates: 52.247326°N 2.017708°W

Bradley Green
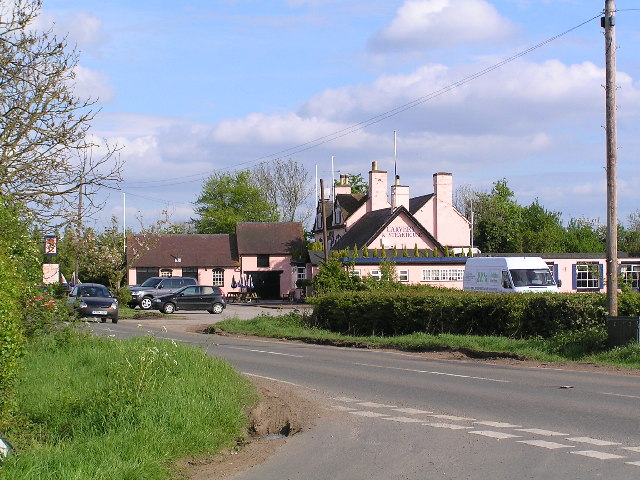
- The Red Lion at Bradley Green.

- Location within Worcestershire
- Population: 133
- OS grid reference: SO988610
  - London: 97 miles (156 km)
- Civil parish: Stock and Bradley
- District: Wychavon
- Shire county: Worcestershire
- Region: West Midlands
- Country: England
- Sovereign state: United Kingdom
- Post town: REDDITCH
- Postcode district: B96
- Dialling code: 01527
- Police: West Mercia
- Fire: Hereford and Worcester
- Ambulance: West Midlands
- UK Parliament: Redditch

Bradley Green is a village in the Wychavon district of Worcestershire, England. It forms the civil parish of Stock and Bradley with its neighbouring village, Stock Green. The parish's population was 327 in 2021.

The village is located just south of the town of Redditch and south of Feckenham, Astwood Bank, Callow Hill and Inkberrow. It is also near the border with the Redditch district.
