= Hadzor =

Village in Worcestershire, England

Coordinates: 52.257966°N 2.125597°W

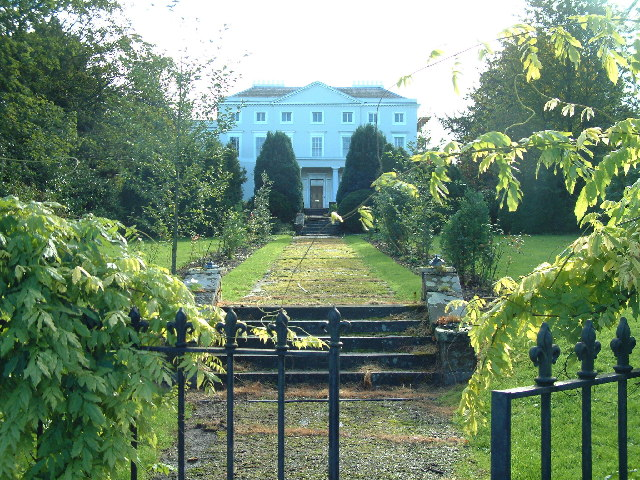
- Hadzor Hall

- Location within Worcestershire
- District: Wychavon
- Shire county: Worcestershire
- Region: West Midlands
- Country: England
- Sovereign state: United Kingdom
- Post town: Droitwich
- Postcode district: WR9
- Police: West Mercia
- Fire: Hereford and Worcester
- Ambulance: West Midlands

Hadzor is a small village near Droitwich, Worcestershire, England. There are around fourteen houses and a Roman Catholic church in the village, although there is no shop or school and the Church of England church was closed in the 1970s. Hadzor is part of the Bowbrook Group of Parishes, which includes the neighbouring villages of Sale Green, Oddingley and Hanbury and nearby Huddington, Crowle, Tibberton and Himbleton.

== History ==
The name Hadzor derives from the Old English Headdsofer meaning 'Headd's tip' or 'Headd's flat topped ridge'.

Frances Amelia (née Arthur), wife of Theodore Howard Galton, converted to Catholicism in 1862, followed a few months later by her husband. In 1877, the Galtons came into possession of Hadzor House. They opened a Catholic chapel in the house and arranged for Mass to be celebrated by a Passionist priest from Broadway.

In 2003, a number of new houses were built on the borders of the village by developer Neil Grinnal. These are not granted direct access to the village, and have thus been dubbed 'New Hadzor' or 'the housing estate', not being considered part of the original village. A long campaign was led against this development under the banner 'keep Hadzor special', but failed to prevent around 70 houses being built. As a consequence of the development, however, Hadzor has since been awarded a village green on land formerly belonging to Hadzor Hall, a large hall formerly owned by Neil Grinnall.

== Gallery ==
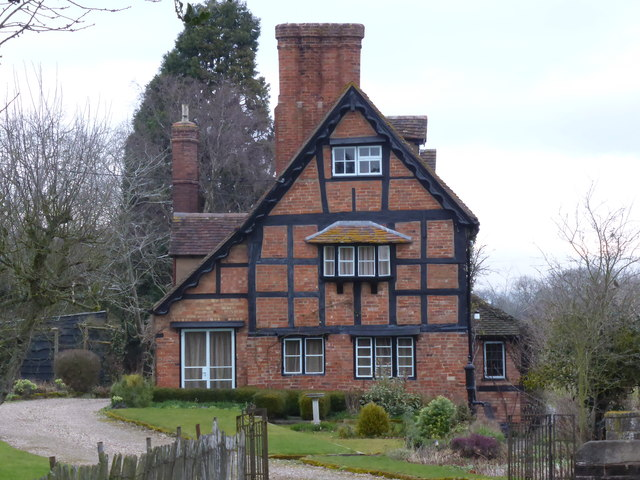
'The Old Manor' of Hazdor (2015)

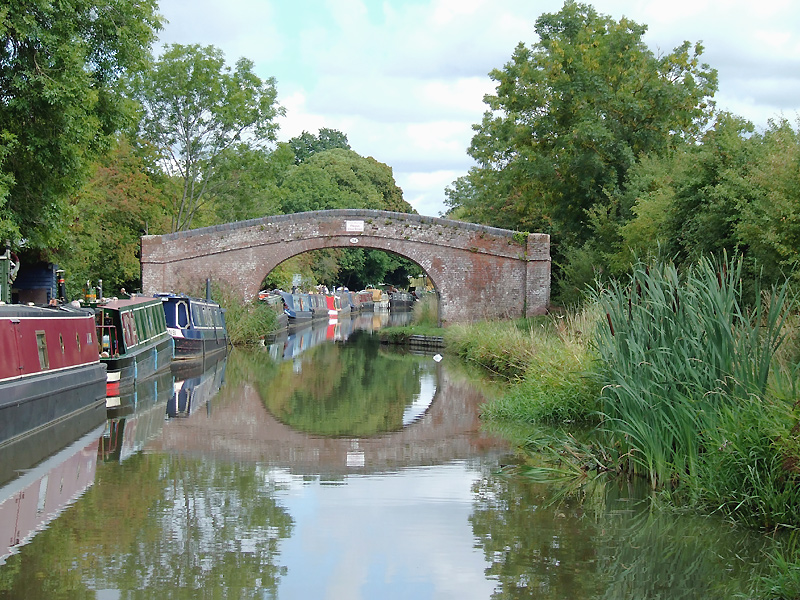
Coffin Bridge, near Hazdor (2010)

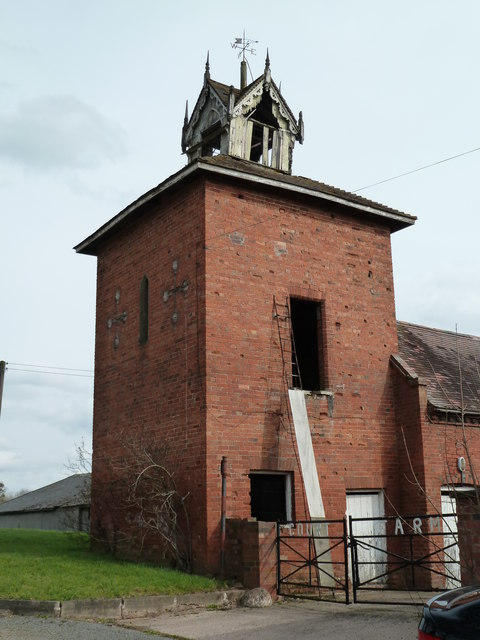
Entrance to Court Farm in Hazdor (2011)

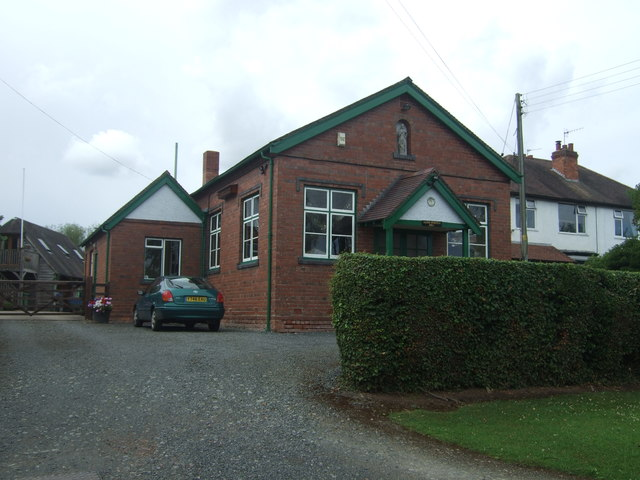
Galton Memorial Hall in Hazdor (2017)

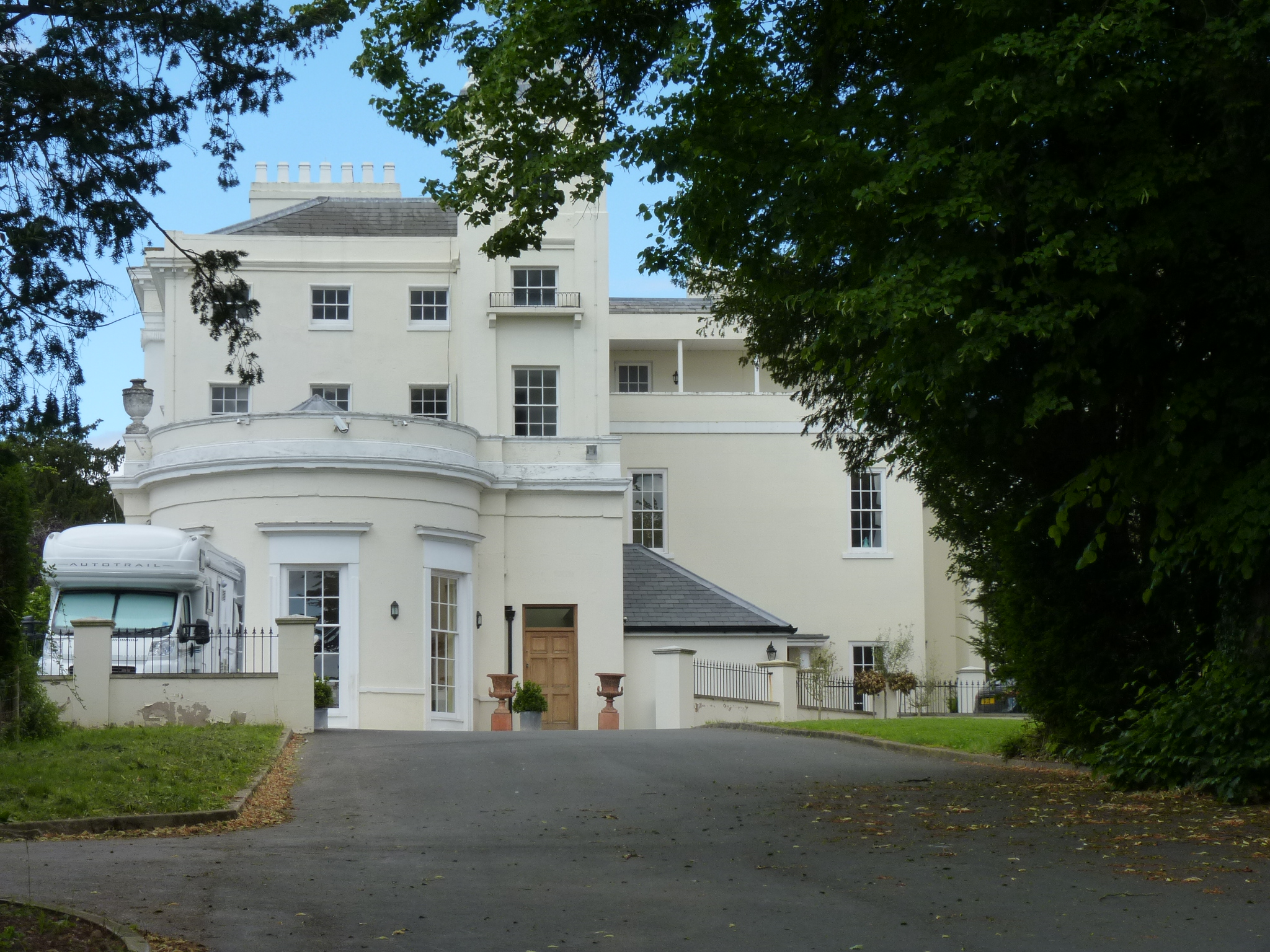
Hazdor Hall (2013)
