= Abbots Morton =

Village in Worcestershire, England

Coordinates: 52.194°N 1.9606°W

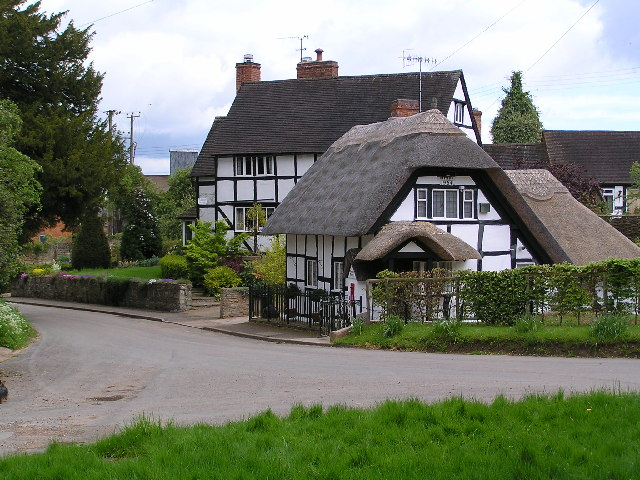
- Abbots Morton village

- Location within Worcestershire
- Population: 139
- OS grid reference: SP027551
  - London: 93 miles (150 km)
- Civil parish: Abbots Morton
- District: Wychavon
- Shire county: Worcestershire
- Region: West Midlands
- Country: England
- Sovereign state: United Kingdom
- Post town: WORCESTER
- Postcode district: WR7
- Dialling code: 01386
- Police: West Mercia
- Fire: Hereford and Worcester
- Ambulance: West Midlands
- UK Parliament: Redditch

Abbots Morton is a village and civil parish in the Wychavon district, in the county of Worcestershire, England. It consists of approximately 70 dwellings. It retains 4 mixed working farms within the village boundaries. The parish includes the hamlet of Goom's Hill. The village was the country retreat for the Abbots of Evesham Abbey and the moat that surrounded their house is still visible. The village church is dedicated to St Peter and is over 1,000 years old. The civil parish population was 139 at the 2021 census.

The hamlet of Morton Spirt lies east of the village.

== History ==
The name Morton derives from the Old English mōrtūn meaning 'settlement on a moor'.

Abbots Morton was listed as Mortune in the Domesday Book of 1086.

The most northerly of the four parishes in the benefice, the parish of Abbots Morton incorporates the hamlets of Morton Spirt, The Low and Gooms Hill as well as the village of Abbots Morton itself.

The parish contains approximately 70 homes. Many of the houses in the village are half-timbered black and white buildings dating from the 17th and 18th centuries; three have 15th century origins.

=== 8th–16th century: Evesham Abbey and Morton Abbatis ===
The Domesday Book of 1086 lists Abbots Morton as "Mortune", assessed at 5 hides and belonging to Evesham Abbey, but the settlement is believed to have been established several hundred years earlier.

Before the Dissolution of the Monasteries in the 16th century, Abbots Morton used to be a country retreat for the abbots of Evesham; the remains of their moated manor house can still be seen near the church. The site of the manor house was acquired by Evesham Abbey in the 8th century, and a building existed on the site before the Norman conquest.

Abbots Morton (Morton Abbatis) was one of the parishes entangled in the dispute between Evesham Abbey and the Bishops of Worcester: both parties claimed control over the churches in the Vale of Evesham and the surrounding area. After 200 years, the dispute was settled in the middle of the 13th century when the abbey was given jurisdiction over all the churches within the Vale apart from one: Abbots Morton.

=== 16th–17th century: the Hoby and Kighley families ===
After the Dissolution, Abbots Morton passed into the hands of the Hoby [Hobby] family, who acquired many of the properties originally belonging to Evesham Abbey. In 1600 ownership of the manor appears to have been disputed: documents held at the Worcestershire Records Office include "Letters Patent of Elizabeth I being a licence for alienation from Richard Hobby [Hoby], esquire, to Richard Mottershed, gent., and Ralph Hodges of the manors of Badsey and Abbots Morton" while the Records of the Kings Remembrancer in the National Archives show "Philip Kighley of Broadway, gentleman to Thomas Edgeok of Broadway, gentleman: Demise, indented, for 3 years, of the manors of Badsey and Abbots Morton,".

Philip Kighley had married Elizabeth Hoby, Richard's daughter, in 1597. It is presumed that the manor of Abbots Morton then passed into the hands of the Kighley family. After Philip's death at the beginning of the 17th century, Elizabeth married Charles Ketilby who sold the manor a few years later.

=== 18th century: the Throckmorton family of Coughton Court ===
By the beginning of the 18th century, much of the land around Abbots Morton appears to have been acquired by the Throckmorton family of Coughton Court. Papers deposited in the Shakespeare Centre Library and Archive record 500-year leases of "rights of common" granted on lands of Sir Robert Throckmorton; and a century later John Throckmorton was disputing the tithes of Abbots Morton.

=== 19th century ===
In 1870–72, John Marius Wilson's Imperial Gazetteer of England and Wales described Abbots Morton like this:

ABBOTS-MORTON, a parish in the district of Alcester and county of Worcester; 6 miles N by E of Fladbury r. station, and 7 WSW of Alcester. It has a post office under Bromsgrove. Acres, 1,420. Real property, £2,091. Pop. 245. Houses, 57. The property is all in one estate. The living is a rectory in the diocese of Worcester. Value, £146. Patron, G. J. A. Walker, Esq. The church is good.

=== 20th Century ===
The church houses the WW1 war memorial to the village's only casualty of the conflict, Private Philip Collins, who served with the local Worcestershire Regiment in Mesopotamia. However it is known that Private 19934 Cecil Roy Pulham of the Machine Gun Corps was born in Abbots Morton in Oct 1895 but moved away and by 1901 was living in Arrow. He was kiiled in action on 21 Mar 1918 in France. There were no local losses during the second world war.

For the early part of the century Abbots Morton became known as Muddy Morton due to the poor roads and properties falling into disrepair. By the 1970s things started to change, properties began to transfer into individual ownership and were renovated rather than pulled down, this led the local council to call the village its "Golden Gem" and making most of the village a conservation area.

The village hall was rebuilt in 1998.

== St Peter's Church ==
The parish church, dedicated to St Peter, stands on the site of a Saxon church. The current Grade I-listed building is the result of rebuilding and alterations performed since the 12th century. The list of Rectors of Abbots Morton stretches back to Petrus le Meare in 1288.

The oldest part of the church is the north wall which dates from the 12th century, and is now supported by a modern buttress. The chancel was rebuilt in the 14th century, with the east window being added later in the same century. The Lady Chapel on the north side of the church, now used for the organ and choir, was added at about the same time.

The south doorway, now the only entrance to the church, was constructed during the 15th century, and two pews from this period are incorporated into the porch. A second doorway, now blocked-up, can be seen in the north wall; this may have been used by the monks from the abbots' retreat to the north of the church. The exposed roof beams, many of them roughly-shaped branches rather than carefully cut timber, have also been dated to the 15th century. In 1955 the residents of the parish raised over £1,300 (worth more than £25,000 today) to preserve the beams.

The tower was built in the late 14th century. The oldest bell, the tenor, dates from the 15th century and may have been hung soon after the tower was completed. It is one of the few remaining "Royal Head" bells, where the stops between the words of the inscription "Virgenis Egregie Vocor Campana Maria" represent the heads of Edward III and Queen Philippa. The 2nd bell is dated 1633, while the 3rd and treble bells were cast by Thomas Mears of London in 1842.
