= Great Comberton =

Village in Worcestershire, England

Coordinates: 52.079848°N 2.065882°W

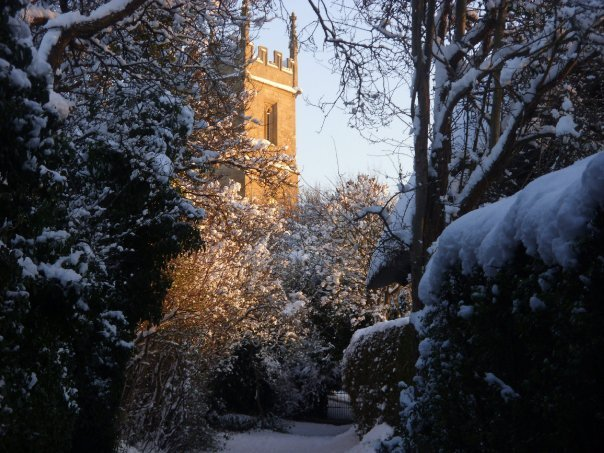
- St Michael's Church, Great Comberton

- Location within Worcestershire
- District: Wychavon
- Shire county: Worcestershire
- Region: West Midlands
- Country: England
- Sovereign state: United Kingdom
- Post town: Pershore
- Postcode district: WR10
- Police: West Mercia
- Fire: Hereford and Worcester
- Ambulance: West Midlands

Great Comberton is a village in Worcestershire, England.

== Location ==
Great Comberton village is located 3 kilometres or two-and-a-half miles south of Pershore, and lies partly on the steep northern slope of Bredon Hill and partly at its foot, on the left bank of the Avon, which, with one of its tributaries, forms the greater part of the western boundary. The southernmost boundary is with the Worcestershire parish of Kemerton, meeting at the summit of the Bredon Hill escarpment. The Mary Brook, another tributary of the Avon, forms Great Comberton's Northern boundary, at the eastern end of which is Mary Brook Bridge. On its southern boundary the parish reaches a height of about 294 m AOD on the North facing slope of Bredon Hill. Part of the village lies within the Cotswold AONB due to Bredon Hill's landscape importance.

== History and amenities ==
The name Comberton derives from the Old English Cumbraingtūn meaning 'settlement connected with Cumbra'.

The history of the village goes back to Saxon times and the village is mentioned in Domesday. The church of St. Michael and All Angels stands near the centre of the village.

In terms of amenities, Great Comberton has a regular bus service travelling to the local town of Pershore.

The village has a thriving village hall which hosts regular events from yoga classes to meetings of the village social club. The church has regular services, on a rota with the other parish churches at Little Comberton, Bricklehampton and Elmley Castle. In 2012, the village's old red phone box was converted into a mini independent library.
