= South Littleton =

Village and civil parish in Worcestershire, England

Coordinates: 52.114°N 1.890°W

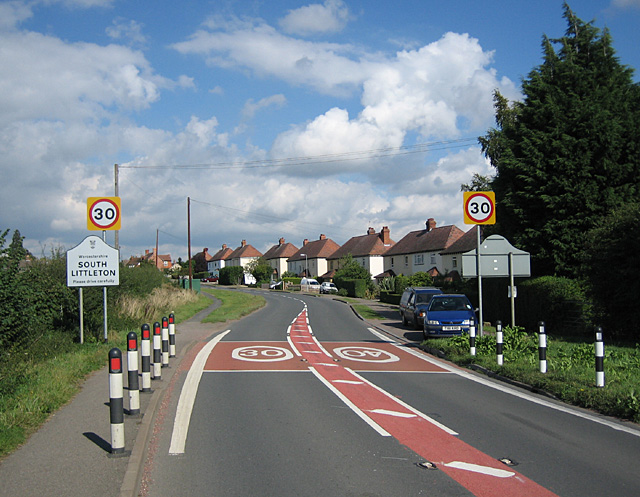
- South Littleton

- Location within Worcestershire
- Population: 950 (2021)
- OS grid reference: SP0790
- Civil parish: South Littleton
- District: Wychavon
- Shire county: Worcestershire
- Region: West Midlands
- Country: England
- Sovereign state: United Kingdom
- Post town: EVESHAM
- Postcode district: WR11
- Dialling code: 01386
- Police: West Mercia
- Fire: Hereford and Worcester
- Ambulance: West Midlands
- UK Parliament: Mid Worcestershire

South Littleton is a village and civil parish located in the Wychavon district of Worcestershire, England.

South Littleton is located midway between Evesham and Bidford on Avon. South Littleton is the largest of The Littletons, with North and Middle Littleton being smaller. At the 2001 census it had 1,775 inhabitants, while North and Middle Littleton had a combined population of 906.

== History ==
Though Neolithic human activity has been documented in the area, it is thought the first permanent settlements were constructed during Romano-British times (the important Roman road of Ryknild Street runs by the area). Other nearby Romano-British at Ullington, Blakes Hill and Littleton Pastures have been documented, and all were thought to be in continuous occupation until the late 4th century. Archeological evidence suggests the area was completely abandoned after the end of the Roman occupation of Britain.

The area had been repopulated to an extent by the time of the Domesday Book, which documents the Littletons twice. Later stone buildings remain in the villages today. The parish remained largely as an agricultural area until the late 1940s. Today, very few of the inhabitants of the parish are employed in agriculture.

== South Littleton today ==
The village is served by South Littleton Parish Council. The Littletons Church of England Academy is in South Littleton which also has a large recreation ground. There are also allotments and bowling and tennis clubs. There is a shop and post office located on the village High Street. There is also a Church of England church and a Quaker chapel located in the village. The 1st Littletons Scout HQ & Meeting Hall is located in the grounds of the large playing field with a playground and gym equipment for public use.

South Littleton is also the location of HMP Long Lartin, a maximum security prison for adult males.
