= Cleeve Prior =

Village in Worcestershire, England

Coordinates: 52.14236°N 1.875174°W

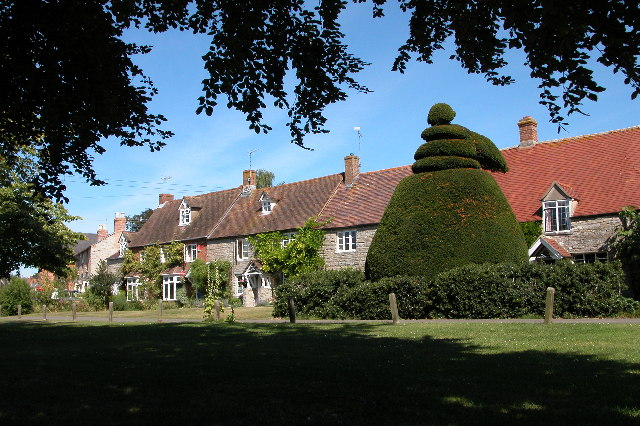

- Location within Worcestershire
- Population: 553
- District: Wychavon
- Shire county: Worcestershire
- Region: West Midlands
- Country: England
- Sovereign state: United Kingdom
- Post town: Evesham
- Postcode district: WR11
- Police: West Mercia
- Fire: Hereford and Worcester
- Ambulance: West Midlands
- UK Parliament: Droitwich and Evesham

Cleeve Prior is a village in the Vale of Evesham, Worcestershire, England. It is situated five miles north-east of Evesham, and its population was 553 in 2021. There are many picturesque houses made from the local lias stone, including the Kings Arms public house and the 150-year-old school. The church is dedicated to St. Andrew and has 6 bells which are rung for the parish service each Sunday.

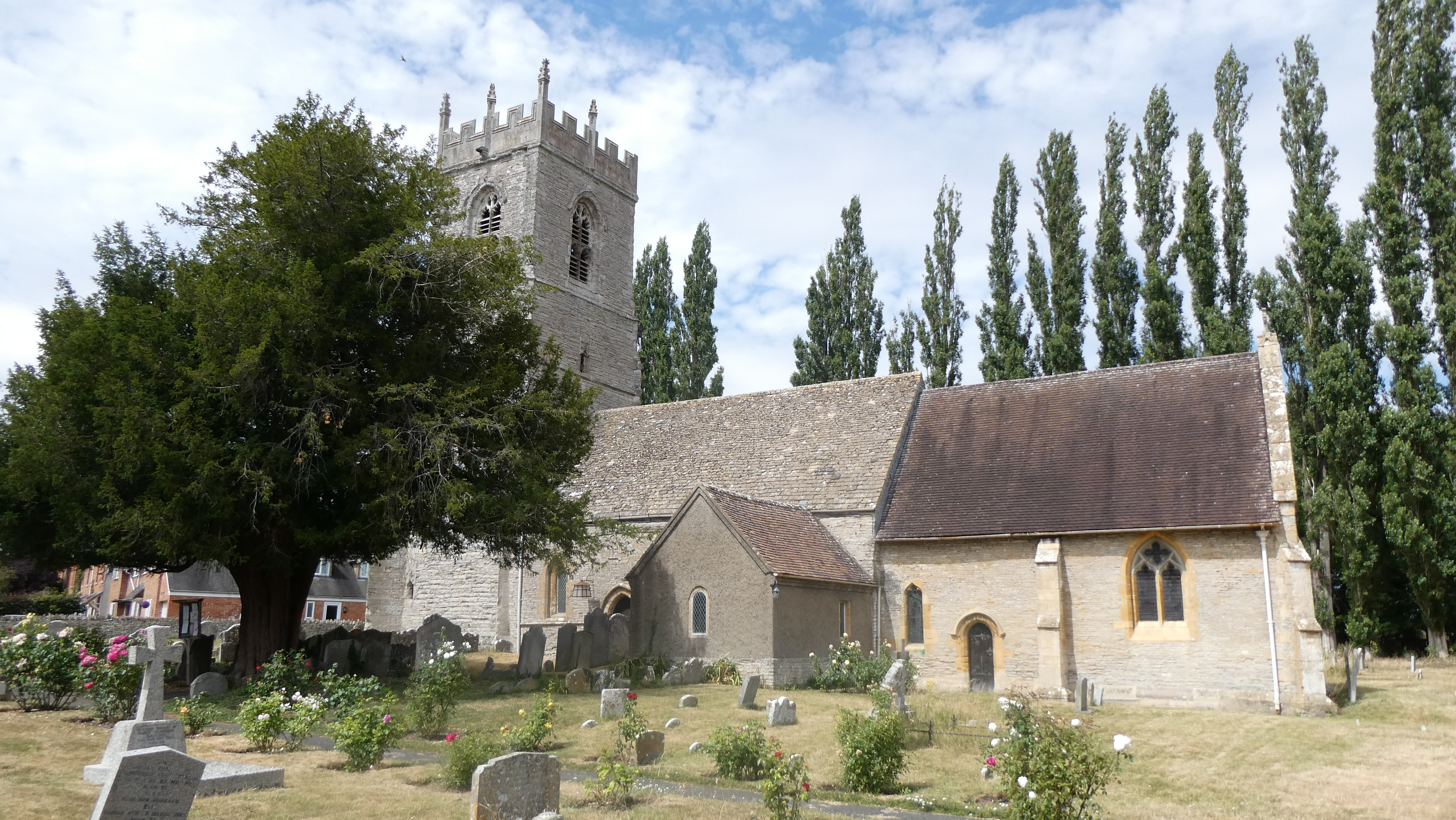
The Church of England St. Andrew's church at Cleeve Prior, Worcestershire, England. July 2025.

== History ==
The name Cleeve, attested in the Domesday Book of 1086 as Clyve, comes from the dative singular form of the Old English word clif ('cliff, bank, steep hill'), referring in this case to the rising ground above the River Avon on which the village is situated. The estate was the property of the Priors of Worcester from early times (recorded in their Latin records as Clyve Prioris) accounting for the Prior element of the name, distinguishing it from nearby Bishop's Cleeve.
