= North and Middle Littleton =

Civil parish in Worcestershire, England

Coordinates: 52.122°N 1.883°W

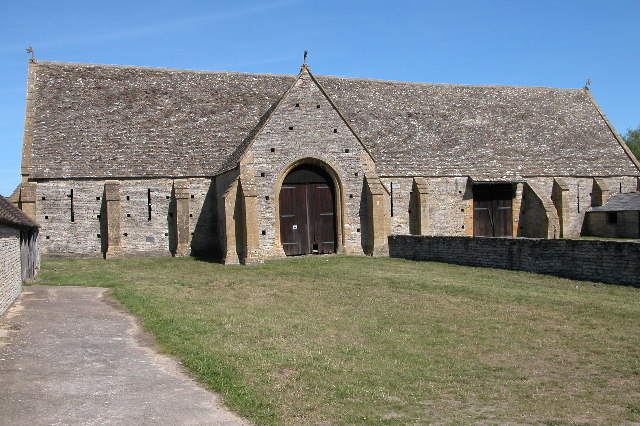
- Middle Littleton Tithe Barn

- Location within Worcestershire
- Population: 924 (2021)
- OS grid reference: SP0847
- Civil parish: North and Middle Littleton
- District: Wychavon
- Shire county: Worcestershire
- Region: West Midlands
- Country: England
- Sovereign state: United Kingdom
- Post town: EVESHAM
- Postcode district: WR11
- Dialling code: 01386
- Police: West Mercia
- Fire: Hereford and Worcester
- Ambulance: West Midlands
- UK Parliament: Droitwich and Evesham

North and Middle Littleton is a civil parish located in the Wychavon district of Worcestershire, England. The parish comprises the villages of North Littleton and Middle Littleton, and is located near the larger settlement of South Littleton. It is bounded by the River Avon to the west, and Buckle Street (the Roman Ryknild St) to the east. At the 2021 census it had a population of 924.

== History ==
Though Neolithic human activity has been documented in the area, it is thought the first permanent settlements were constructed during Romano-British times (the important Roman road of Ryknild Street runs by the area). Other nearby Romano-British settlements at Ullington, Blakes Hill and Littleton Pastures have been documented, and all were thought to be in continuous occupation until the late 4th century. Archeological evidence suggests the area was completely abandoned after the end of the Roman occupation of Britain.

The area had been repopulated to an extent by the time of the Domesday Book, which documents the Littletons twice. "Littletune" (thought to be North Littleton), was owned by Evesham Abbey, and had a population of 18 who farmed the land owned by the abbey. St Nicholas Church located in Middle Littleton is thought to have been first constructed in the 12th century, though it was significantly remodelled in the 13th century. The Tithe Barn is an early 14th-century farm building which is now owned by the National Trust.

Middle Littleton Manor House is a 17th-century Jacobean style manor house, and was constructed using local stone. Later stone buildings remain in the villages today. In the 19th century, 23 people were listed in the parish as working in farming or market gardening. It remained largely as an agricultural area until the late 1940s. Today, very few of the inhabitants of the parish are employed in agriculture.

=== North and Middle Littleton today ===
The villages are served by North and Middle Littleton Parish Council. St Nicholas (Church of England) Church is located in Middle Littleton, as is Littleton Village Hall.

Middle Littleton is home to the Farm Animal Sanctuary, whose supporters include Princess Iman bint Hussein of Jordan.

== Sports ==
The local football team, Littleton FC, play in the West Midlands (Regional) League.
