= Bishampton =

Coordinates: 52.160094°N 2.017508°W

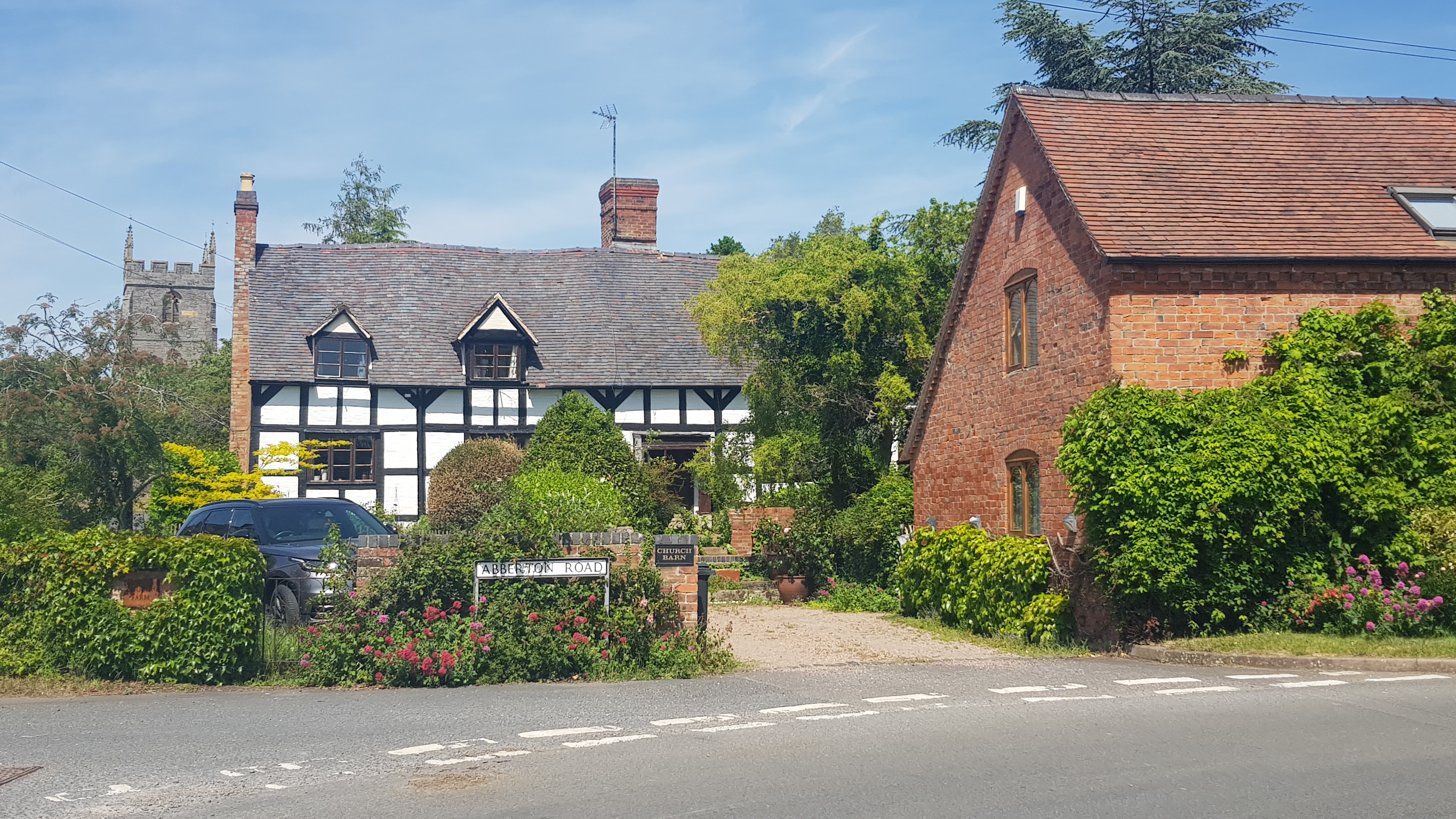

- Location within Worcestershire
- Population: 625
- OS grid reference: SO988513
  - London: 94 miles (151 km)
- Civil parish: Bishampton
- District: Wychavon
- Shire county: Worcestershire
- Region: West Midlands
- Country: England
- Sovereign state: United Kingdom
- Post town: PERSHORE
- Postcode district: WR10
- Dialling code: 01386
- Police: West Mercia
- Fire: Hereford and Worcester
- Ambulance: West Midlands
- UK Parliament: Droitwich and Evesham

Bishampton is a village and civil parish in the Wychavon district of Worcestershire, England with a population of 625. It contains a church, a village shop and post office (which is now also a cafe), a hairdresser, a village hall with a park and children's play areas. There is a nature reserve and a cricket pitch within walking distance of the village. Just outside the village is a golf club with 9- and 18-hole courses, a driving range, and clubhouse and restaurant.

== History ==
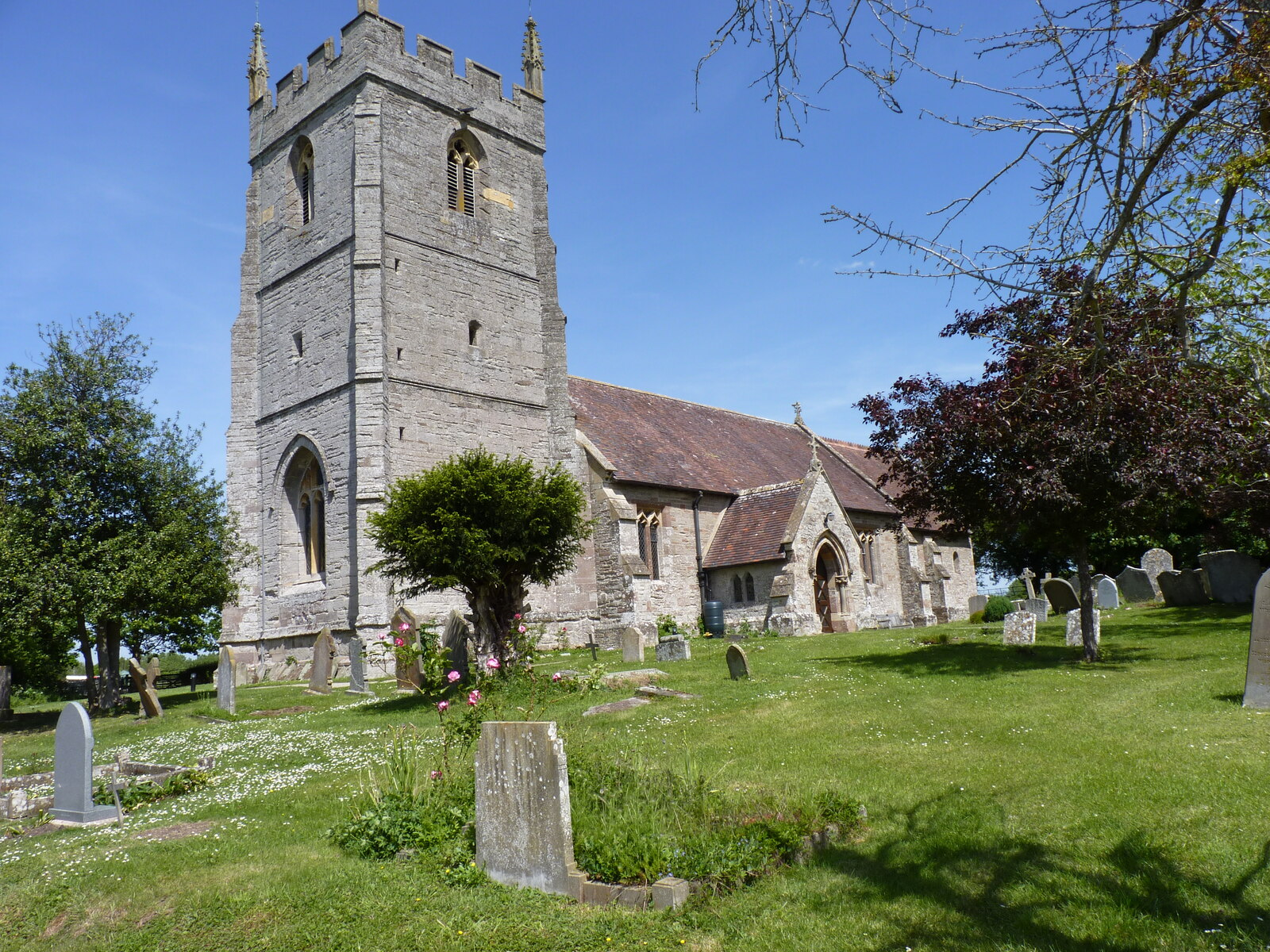
Church of St James

The name Bishampton derives from the Old English Bisahām meaning 'Bisa's village', or Bisahamm meaning 'Bisa's hemmed-in land', and tūn meaning 'settlement'.

Bishampton is mentioned in the Doomsday Book.

In 1795 an Inclosure Act for the village was passed, the award was made in 1797.

St. James Church in Bishampton was built in the twelfth century. A western tower was built circa. 1400 and the nave and chancel were completely rebuilt in 1870, the stonework of the doors and windows being reused where possible.

In 2019, people from Bishampton and surrounding villages came together to share their opinions on the Throckmorton Airfield housing development. The development would bring over 2,000 houses to the area as well as schools, services and employment.

== Demographics ==
=== Population ===
Since 2001, the population has slightly declined from 678 to 675 in 2011 and down to 637 in 2021 according to UK Census data.

Historical population
Year	Pop.	±%
2001	678	—
2011	675	−0.4%
2021	637	−5.6%

=== Gender ===
The 2021 Census recorded a population of 331 males (52%) and 306 females (48%).

=== Notable people ===
Fashion designer Stella McCartney lives near the village in the parish.
