= Little Comberton =

Village in Worcestershire, England

Coordinates: 52.085212°N 2.050449°W

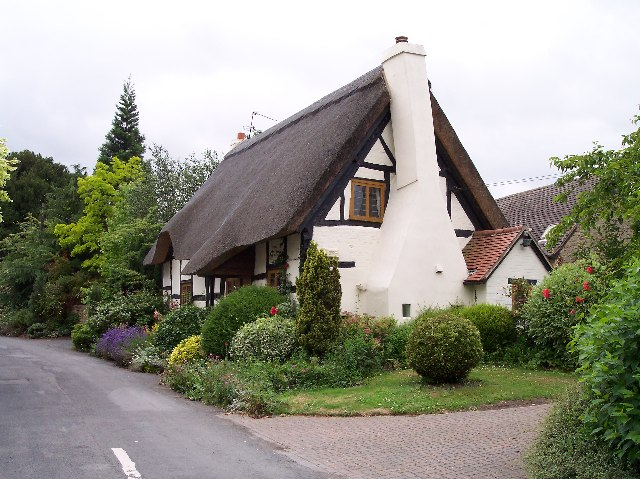
- Little Comberton

- Location within Worcestershire
- OS grid reference: SO966429
- District: Wychavon
- Shire county: Worcestershire
- Region: West Midlands
- Country: England
- Sovereign state: United Kingdom
- Post town: PERSHORE
- Postcode district: WR10
- Police: West Mercia
- Fire: Hereford and Worcester
- Ambulance: West Midlands

Little Comberton is a small village in Worcestershire, England. It is located 2.5 miles (4.0 km) to the southeast of Pershore.

The name Comberton derives from the Old English Cumbraingtūn meaning 'settlement connected with Cumbra'.

The Rectorship of Little Comberton, Pershore, Worcestershire, was held by the Lowndes family continuously for 113 years. The Rev. William Dobson Lowndes was Rector for 43 years, and his father The Rev. Edward Spencer Lowndes also had been Rector, and his grandfather The Rev. William Parker also had been Rector.

Little Comberton has a village website: www.little-comberton.com.
