= Lower Moor =

Village in Worcestershire, England

Coordinates: 52.124°N 2.032°W

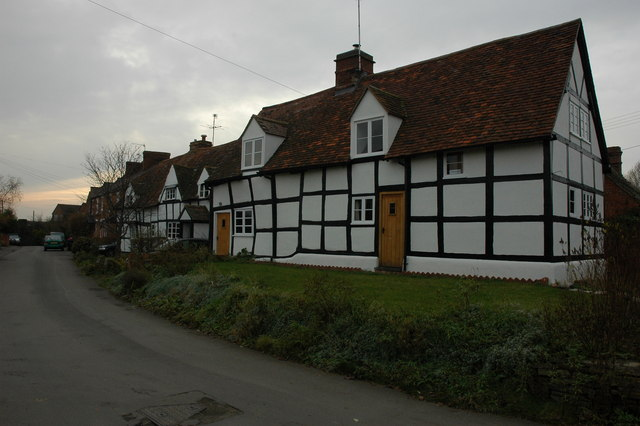
Cottages in Lower Moor

Lower Moor is a village in the district of Wychavon in Worcestershire, England. It is between Wyre Piddle and Fladbury.
