= Grafton Flyford =

Village in Worcestershire, England

Coordinates: 52.214054°N 2.052049°W

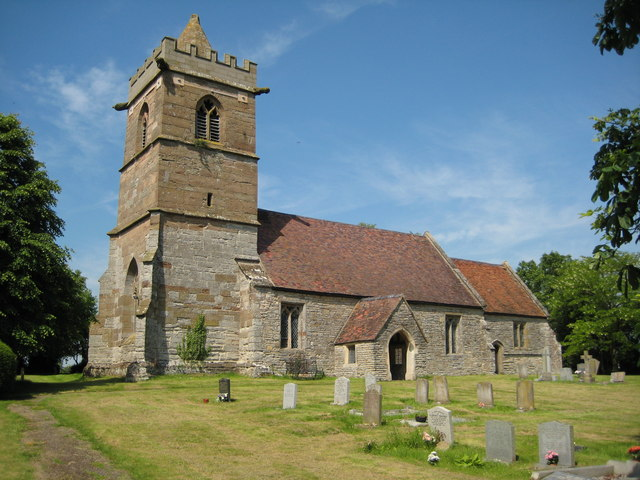
- Grafton Flyford Church

- Location within Worcestershire
- OS grid reference: SO 962 557
- District: Wychavon
- Shire county: Worcestershire
- Region: West Midlands
- Country: England
- Sovereign state: United Kingdom
- Post town: Worcester
- Postcode district: WR7
- Police: West Mercia
- Fire: Hereford and Worcester
- Ambulance: West Midlands

Grafton Flyford is a village about 6 miles (9.7 km) east of Worcester, in Worcestershire, England.

It neighbours Stock Green, with the large farm house Hill Top Farm standing on the border.

In 1377, or 1378, Henry de Ardern was granted the manor of Grafton Flyford by the Earl of Warwick for a red rose.

The name Grafton derives from the Old English grāftūn meaning 'settlement by a grove'. The affix Flyford refers to the village's position near Flyford Flavell.

== St John's Church ==
The Church of St John the Baptist is a Grade II* listed building. The earliest parts are of the 13th to 14th century; the tower, of the 14th century, has an embattled parapet, within which is a short stone spire. The east window is 15th-century. The church was restored in 1875 by William Hopkins.

== Deserted medieval village ==
To the north-west and north-east of the church are earthworks (a scheduled monument) showing the remains of a deserted medieval village. There are enclosures, the largest about 120 by 130 metres (390 by 430 ft), which were once gardens or paddocks, and within some are house platforms. Sunken trackways run between the enclosures. Remains of five ponds can be discerned, and an area of medieval ridge and furrows.

== Grafton Wood ==
To the east of the village is Grafton Wood, a nature reserve of the Worcestershire Wildlife Trust. It is ancient woodland, and is the centre of the only colony of brown hairstreak butterflies in the Midlands.
