= Norton and Lenchwick =

Civil parish in Worcestershire, England

Coordinates: 52.1305137°N 1.9809434°W

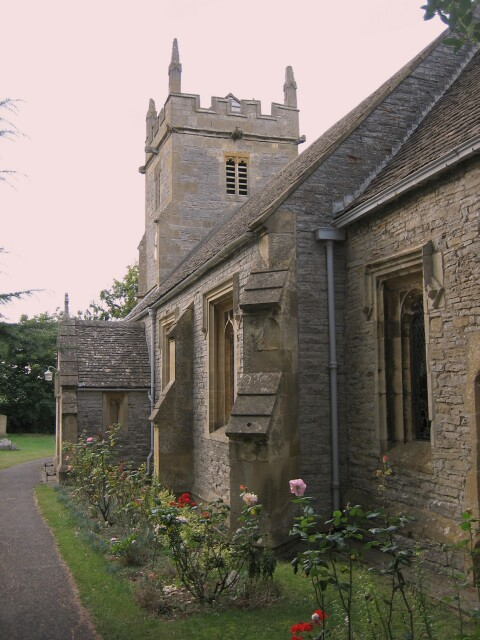
- St Egwin's parish church in Norton

- Location within Worcestershire
- Population: 1,056 (2021 census)
- OS grid reference: SP040475
- Civil parish: Norton and Lenchwick
- District: Wychavon
- Shire county: Worcestershire
- Region: West Midlands
- Country: England
- Sovereign state: United Kingdom
- Post town: EVESHAM
- Postcode district: WR11
- Police: West Mercia
- Fire: Hereford and Worcester
- Ambulance: West Midlands
- UK Parliament: Redditch

Norton and Lenchwick is a civil parish in the Wychavon district, in the county of Worcestershire, England. The parish population in 2021 was 1,056. The parish contains the village of Norton and the hamlet of Lenchwick. A local heritage trust states that the parish area might be home to the UK's largest body of plum trees, although their historic setting is under threat.

== Politics ==
The parish falls within the Redditch constituency in parliament, and is represented by the Labour Party MP Chris Bloore. It lies within the non-metropolitan district of Wychavon.

== Demographics ==
At the 2021 UK census, the parish population was recorded as 1,056. The White ethnic group made up 97.9% of the population, whilst Christianity was the largest religion, at 61.3%.
