= Elmbridge, Worcestershire =

Coordinates: 52.31°N 2.15°W

Elmbridge
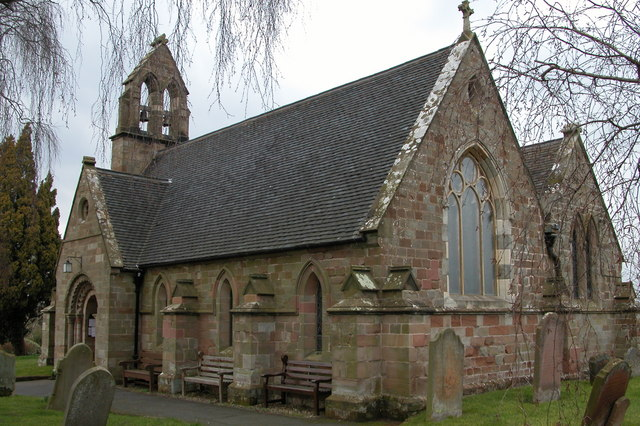
- St Mary's Church

- Location within Worcestershire
- Area: 7.82 km^{2} (3.02 sq mi)
- Population: 497 (2021)
  - Density: 64/km^{2} (170/sq mi)
- Civil parish: Elmbridge
- District: Wychavon
- Shire county: Worcestershire
- Region: West Midlands
- Country: England
- Sovereign state: United Kingdom
- Post town: Droitwich
- Postcode district: WR9
- UK Parliament: Droitwich and Evesham

Elmbridge is a small community, mainly clustered in a village and forms a civil parish in Worcestershire, England. Its population was 497 in 2021.

== Toponymy ==
Its name is a corruption of the Old English words elm and hrycg, both pronounced akin to their modern forms 'elm and ridge'.

== Geography ==
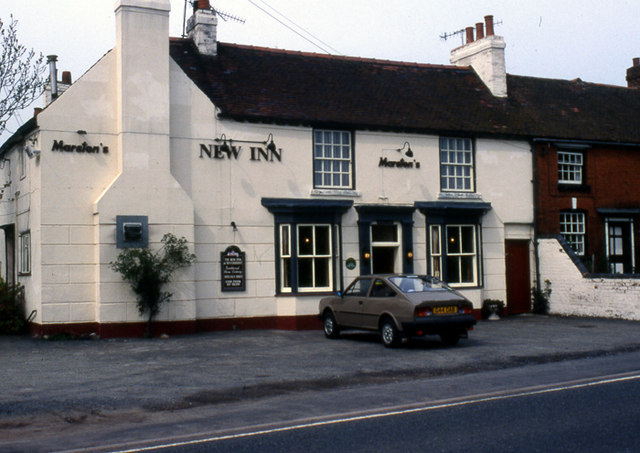
The New Inn

It occupies the top of the gentle, mainly green, vale of the Elmbridge Brook which feeds south a few miles into Droitwich Spa, there flowing into the short Salwarpe, in navigability superseded by the Droitwich Canal, both left-bank tributaries of the Severn.

The ecclesiastical parish has essentially the same boundaries. A long, north–south, strip parish, it broadens in the southwest to take in the minor neighbourhood of Broad Common which straddles the streets Kidderminster Road and The Knoll and a little of adjacent Broad Alley. Near Broad Common it takes in about half of the linear neighbourhood, Cutnall Green, along the Kidderminster Road and most of Forest Drive. These are 20th-century homes, mainly with gardens. Beside the church is a public green, In private gardens, opposite, lies a pond.

Ambridge, the fictional village in the fictional county of Borsetshire, in The Midlands, may possibly have been based on Cutnall Green.

== Amenities ==
Its Anglican church, Saint Mary's, is largely a Victorian reconstruction of the medieval building documented in travel gazetteers, county histories and diocesan records. Its pub-restaurant serves traditional fare.
