= Conderton =

Hamlet in Worcestershire, England

Coordinates: 52.032165°N 2.053199°W

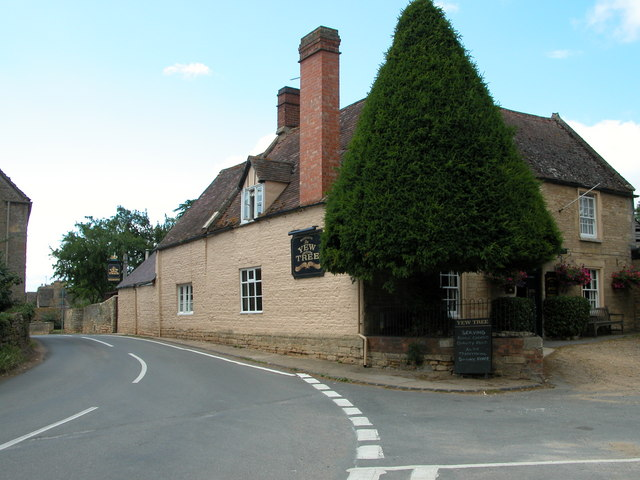
- The Yew Tree Inn

- Location within Worcestershire
- Civil parish: Overbury
- District: Wychavon
- Shire county: Worcestershire
- Region: West Midlands
- Country: England
- Sovereign state: United Kingdom
- Post town: Tewkesbury
- Postcode district: GL20
- Dialling code: 01386
- Police: West Mercia
- Fire: Hereford and Worcester
- Ambulance: West Midlands
- UK Parliament: West Worcestershire

Conderton is a small hamlet in the Wychavon district of Worcestershire, England.

== Toponymy ==
The name Conderton is derived from the Old English Cantware-tūn, meaning "Farmstead of the Kent dwellers or Kentishmen". It has been recorded as Cantuaretun (875) and Canterton (1201).

== History ==
There is evidence of Roman activity within the area, shown by the presence of samian pottery in a nearby site.

The earliest known record of Conderton is in an Anglo-Saxon charter of 875, where it is grouped together with Overbury and Pendock. Land in the area was granted to St Mary's minster, Worcester, by Ceolwulf II of Mercia. Conderton is not mentioned within the Domesday Book, but is assumed to still be connected to Overbury.

== Governance ==
Conderton is primarily governed by Overbury Parish Council. It is then governed by Wychavon District Council. It falls within the West Worcestershire constituency.

== Geography ==
Conderton is located on the south side of Bredon Hill, near the villages of Overbury and Beckford.
