= Kington, Worcestershire =

Village in Worcestershire, England

Coordinates: 52.20129°N 2.01579°W

Kington
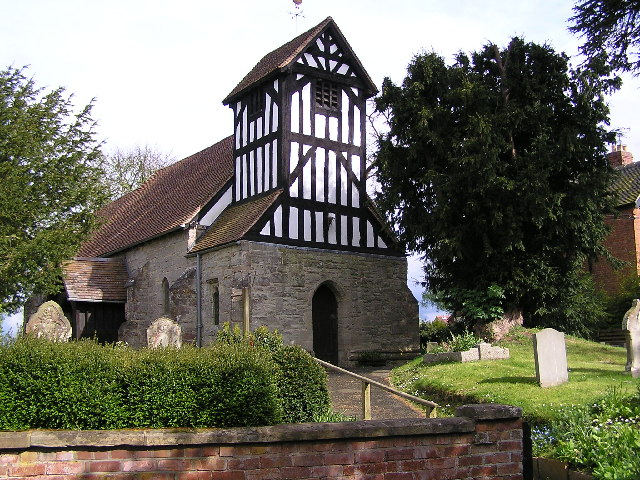
- 13th Century Church of St.James at Kington

- Location within Worcestershire
- OS grid reference: SO990558
- District: Wychavon
- Shire county: Worcestershire
- Region: West Midlands
- Country: England
- Sovereign state: United Kingdom
- Post town: WORCESTER
- Postcode district: WR7
- Police: West Mercia
- Fire: Hereford and Worcester
- Ambulance: West Midlands

Kington is a village in Worcestershire, England, situated near to Flyford Flavell.

== History ==
The earliest known recording of Kington in the Domesday Book under "cyne-turne" – the "King's farmstead".

Kington had two Anabaptist congregations in 1669, as with some other parts of eastern Worcestershire, where they had strongest support among poorer people.

In 1714 Mr and Mrs Woolmere sold the Manor of Kington to Thomas Vernon (1654–1721). As he had no children the estate passed to his second cousin Bowater Vernon and then in turn to Thomas Vernon (1724–1771).
