= Birlingham =

Village in Worcestershire, England

Coordinates: 52.083°N 2.1°W

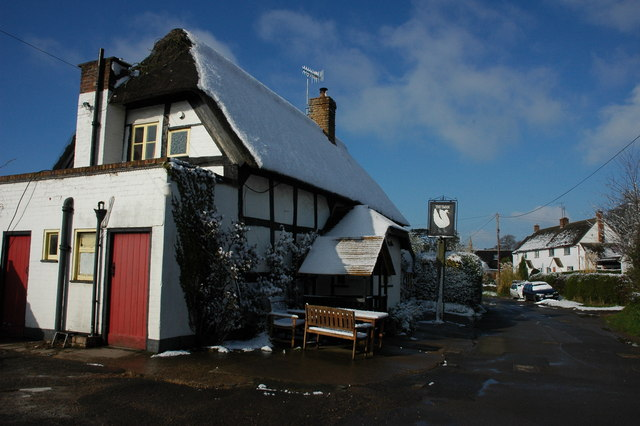
- The Swan, Birlingham

- Location within Worcestershire
- OS grid reference: SO932428
- Civil parish: Birlingham
- District: Wychavon
- Shire county: Worcestershire
- Region: West Midlands
- Country: England
- Sovereign state: United Kingdom
- Post town: PERSHORE
- Postcode district: WR10
- Dialling code: 01386
- Police: West Mercia
- Fire: Hereford and Worcester
- Ambulance: West Midlands
- UK Parliament: West Worcestershire

Birlingham is a village and civil parish in the Wychavon district of Worcestershire. The village is south of Pershore, located in a bend of the River Avon.

== Toponymy ==
The name Birlingham is derived from the Old English Byrla–inga–hamm, meaning "Land, in a river-bend, of a man called Byrla". It has been recorded as Byrlingahamm (972) and Berlingeham (1086, Domesday Book).

== History ==
=== Roman Britain ===
Romans are believed to have settled in Birlingham during the Roman occupation of Britain, suggested by the discovery of a Roman brooch within the village. It is possible that there was a crossing point near the village at Swans Neck, though no evidence has been found of this.

=== Late Middle Ages ===
The Swan Inn, the village's public house, is believed to date back to the 16th century.

== Governance ==
The village of Birlingham is primarily governed by Birlingham Parish Council, then by Wychavon District Council. It falls within the West Worcestershire constituency.

== Geography and demography ==
Birlingham is surrounded on the north, south and east sides by a river-bend known as Swans Neck, part of the River Avon. The village is located on a floodplain. Bow Brook passes by the village's west side.

Nearby villages include Defford and Eckington.

In 2001, the parish had a population of 325, compared to a population of 373 in 1991.

== Transport ==
There are two bus services that serve Birlingham: the 52/53, which goes between Worcester and Eckington (via Pershore and Evesham), and the 54, which goes between Worcester and Pershore. Both services are run by FirstGroup.

== Places of worship ==
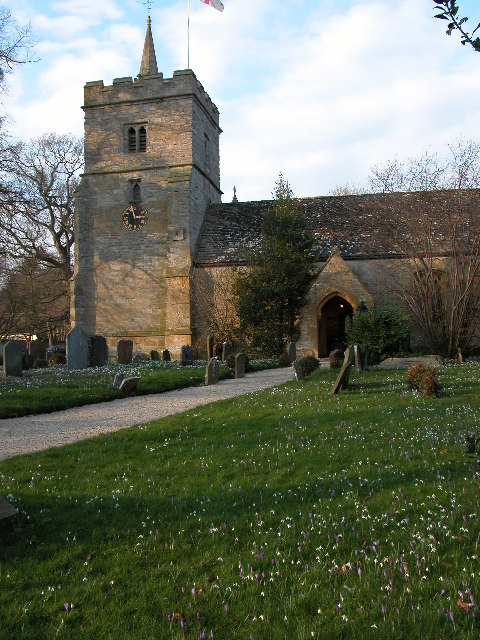
Church of St James the Great

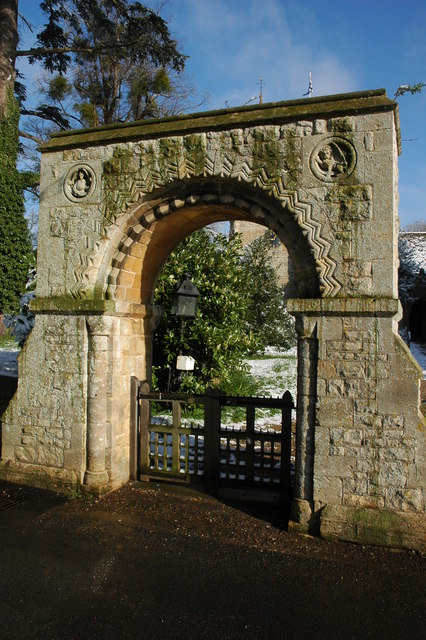
The church's original chancel arch

Flag flown from the church tower

Birlingham is served by the church of St James the Great, located in the Anglican Diocese of Worcester. The original church was built in the 12th century, with its chancel arch now located outside as the churchyard's entrance. The current west tower was built in the 15th century, the rest of the church being rebuilt around the 1870s by Rev Robert Rashleigh Duke.

== Sport ==
Birlingham is represented in Worcestershire Cricket League Division League Six by Birlingham Cricket Club.
