= Bickmarsh =

Village in Worcestershire, England

Coordinates: 52.148082°N 1.847319°W

- Location within Worcestershire
- Population: 65
- OS grid reference: SP105499
  - London: 87 miles (140 km)
- Civil parish: Bickmarsh
- District: Wychavon
- Shire county: Worcestershire
- Region: West Midlands
- Country: England
- Sovereign state: United Kingdom
- Post town: ALCESTER
- Postcode district: B50
- Dialling code: 01789
- Police: West Mercia
- Fire: Hereford and Worcester
- Ambulance: West Midlands

Bickmarsh is a village and civil parish in the Wychavon district of Worcestershire, England. According to the 2001 census it had a population of 65. The village is on the Warwickshire border, and is about eight miles north-east of Evesham.
