= Besford =

Village in Worcestershire, England

Coordinates: 52.101808°N 2.131749°W

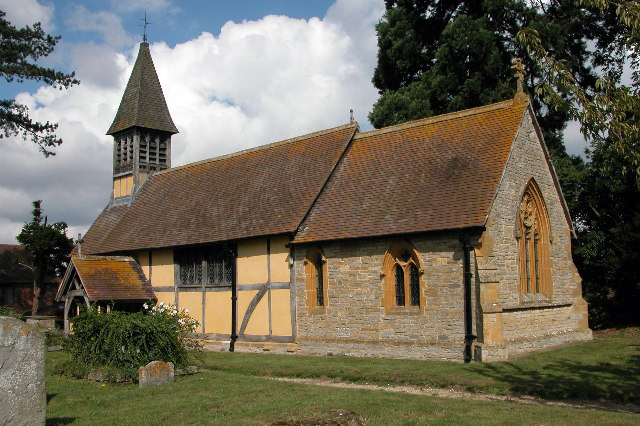
- The church of St Peter in Besford is one of the few timber frame churches in England

- Location within Worcestershire
- Population: 258
- OS grid reference: SO910448
  - London: 96 miles (154 km)
- Civil parish: Besford
- District: Wychavon
- Shire county: Worcestershire
- Region: West Midlands
- Country: England
- Sovereign state: United Kingdom
- Post town: WORCESTER
- Postcode district: WR8
- Dialling code: 01386
- Police: West Mercia
- Fire: Hereford and Worcester
- Ambulance: West Midlands

Besford is a village and civil parish in the Wychavon district of Worcestershire, England. According to the 2021 census it had a population of 258. The village is near Pershore, off the road from Upton-upon-Severn. A historic house, Besford Court (a grade II* listed building), is located in the village. Besford Court was once used as a school known as Besford Court Hospital.

The name Besford derives from the Old English Bettisford meaning 'Betti's ford'.

The village is reputedly haunted by the ghost of a member of the Seabright family, who appears in a nightshirt.
