= Dormston =

Coordinates: 52.218°N 2.019°W

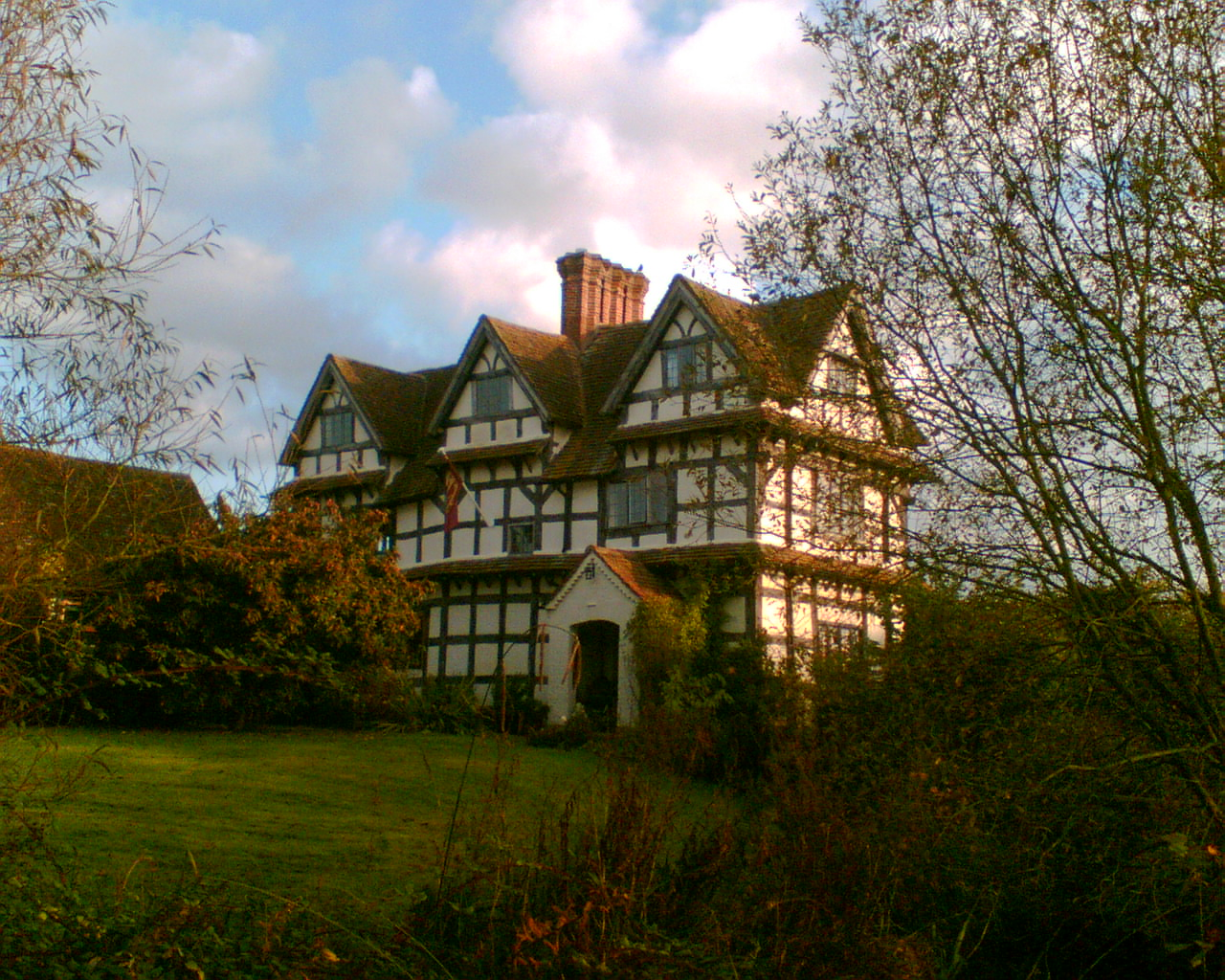
- A timber-framed manor house at Dormston

- Location within Worcestershire
- Population: 447 (2021 census)
- OS grid reference: SO9857
- Civil parish: Dormston
- District: Wychavon
- Shire county: Worcestershire
- Region: West Midlands
- Country: England
- Sovereign state: United Kingdom
- Post town: Worcester
- Postcode district: WR7
- Dialling code: 01386
- Police: West Mercia
- Fire: Hereford and Worcester
- Ambulance: West Midlands
- UK Parliament: Droitwich and Evesham
- Website: Welcome to Dormston Parish Council

Dormston is a village and civil parish in Worcestershire about 3 miles (4.8 km) south of Redditch. The civil parish population was 447 in 2021.

== Name ==
The name Dormston derives from the Old English Deormodstūn meaning 'Deormod's settlement'.

Dormston's toponym has evolved from Deormodesealdtune in the 10th century via Dormestun in the 11th Century and Dormyston in the 15th century before reaching its present form.

== History ==
Dormston existed in the 10th century, when King Edgar confirmed a grant of property including five manses at Dormston to Pershore Abbey of St.Mary. This was then given, with part of the manor of Pershore, to Westminster Abbey by Edward the Confessor, and Dormston was included in 1086 among the lands of St. Peter of Westminster. William Fitz Corbucion, whose principal seat was at Studley in Warwickshire, is said by Dugdale to have been succeeded by a Robert, who had been followed before 1166 by Peter Corbucion of Studley, who was then holding a knight's fee in Worcestershire (evidently Dormston) of the Abbot of Westminster. By 1320 the fee of Dormston had by that date become annexed to the manor of nearby Inkberrow until 1633.

The manor subsequently changed hands several times. In 1388 the feudal superiority was in the hands of John Russell of Strensham and his descendant Sir John Russell of Strensham still held it in 1582. For a time, he was married to Elizabeth Sheldon, first cousin to William Savage of Elmley Castle (d.1616). (The Sheldons had also acquired the monastery lands at Studley). It appears to have been his son, another John Russell, who received a licence (presumably for the Savages) to crenellate the mansion-house at Dormston. This superiority appears to have followed the descent of Strensham until 1659, and it is possible that it still remained in the possession of the Russells and was sold after the death of the last male representative of the family, Sir Francis Russell, in 1705. What is clear is that Dormston was no longer a residential seat of the Russells, if it ever had been. By 1603 Dormston Manor was held by feu by Thomas Savage (d.1603) of Norbury Manor at Inkberrow, who settled it upon John Savage of Dormston for whom he was guardian(d. Jan 1616 and buried in St.Peter's Church, Inkberrow). The principal parts of the manorial demesne were Courts Close and Bag End farm. Russell himself was already related to the Savages as his mother, Margaret Lygon, was a first cousin to Francis Savage of Elmley Castle (d.1558), from whom the Inkberrow Savages descend. Dormston remained with this family until Robert Savage (1672-1749), who was married to Dorothy (d.1715), daughter of John Stanford of Salford Hall in Abbots Salford (d.1712). In 1701 he was one of local commissioners appointed in Worcestershire for collecting aid to meet the expenses of Her Majesty's navy guards and garrisons, and was again a local commissioner for the collection of a land tax in both 1710 and 1713. In 1730 Robert Savage was being sued in connection with the proposed sale of lands he held in Dormston, Kington & Inkberrow, and by indenture dated 1733 he sold the Bag End farm at Dormston which property eventually came by conveyance to Jane Suffield, aunt to the celebrated author J. R. R. Tolkien. In 1733 he was still described as Robert Savage 'The Elder', gentleman, of Dormston, implying he was still resident there. The following year his daughter Penelope was married in Worcester Cathedral, appropriate for gentry, to Giles Turberville, one of H.M. Excise Officers. Robert has signed the Marriage Licence and the Bondsman for this Marriage Bond, William Bristo, also came from Dormston. Robert Savage appears to be the last of this family seated at Dormston and he died at Alcester. He is interred at Inkberrow where there is a Savage chapel in St. Peter's Church. The 1634 Visitation gives the Arms of this family.

== Church ==
Peter Corbucion granted a Chapel at Dormston in the reign of Henry II to the monastery he had founded at Studley in Warwickshire.

The present Church of England parish church of Saint Nicholas has a 14th-century nave and chancel. Its timber-framed bell tower was added late in the 15th century, and the largest of its three bells is of the same period. The two other bells were cast in 1613 and 1640. The Gothic Revival architect C.C. Rolfe restored the church building in 1899. Robert Savage of Dormston (c1600-1670) was ordained as a Churchwarden here in 1621. The church building was Grade I listed in 1965.

== Sources ==
- Page, W.H.; Willis-Bund, J.W., eds. (1924). Victoria County History: A History of the County of Worcestershire, Volume 4. pp. 65–68.
- Pevsner, Nikolaus (1968). Worcestershire. The Buildings of England. Harmondsworth: Penguin Books.
- Saint, Andrew (1970). "Three Oxford Architects". Oxoniensia. XXXV. Oxfordshire Architectural and Historical Society: 53ff. Archived from the original on 28 September 2007.
