= Childswickham =

Village in Worcestershire, England

Coordinates: 52.04398°N 1.89192°W

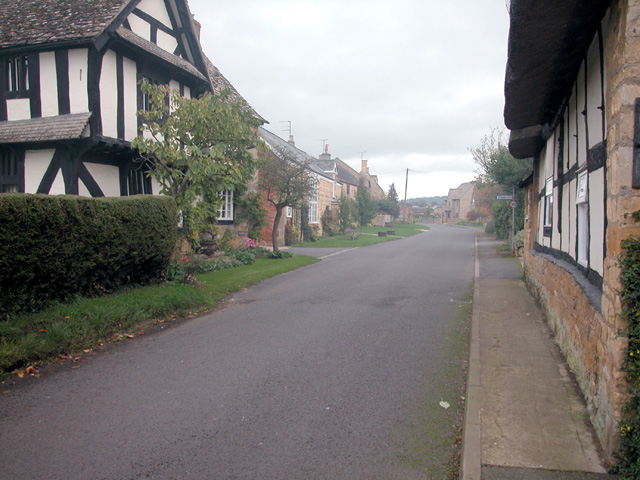

- Location within Worcestershire
- Population: 745 (2021 census)
- OS grid reference: SP080372
- Civil parish: Childswickham
- District: Wychavon
- Shire county: Worcestershire
- Region: West Midlands
- Country: England
- Sovereign state: United Kingdom
- Post town: BROADWAY
- Postcode district: WR12
- Police: West Mercia
- Fire: Hereford and Worcester
- Ambulance: West Midlands

Childswickham is a village and civil parish in the Wychavon district, in Worcestershire, England, situated within the flat open landscape of the Vale of Evesham, between the Bredon and Cotswold Hills, two miles from Broadway. In 2021 the parish had a population of 745. It is within the boundaries of the historic county of Gloucestershire. It is an area predominantly of market gardening, arable and pasture land, with surrounding fields defined by hedgerows.

Being on the edge of the North Cotswolds it has a mixture of building styles, from Cotswold limestone to red brick, to the more traditional Worcestershire black and white half timber and thatch. The earliest buildings are timber framed with wattle and daub and Cotswold limestone.

The name Childswickham is of uncertain derivation. Childs derives from the Old English cild meaning 'child', referring to the younger son of a nobleman. The Wickham element is of unknown origins but possibly derives from the Welsh gwiggwaun meaning 'wood moor'.

Its history can be traced back to Roman times as coins and pottery of this era were found in fields on the old Roman road from Worcester to London which came through the village.

The 15th-century spire of the original Norman church, St Mary the Virgin, is a local landmark and can be seen for several miles.

Childswickham was a part of Gloucestershire until 1931.

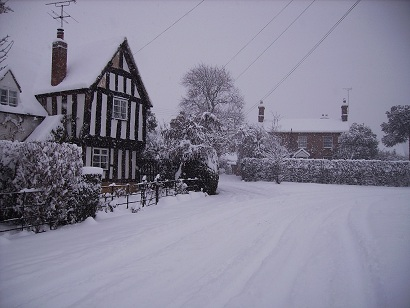
December 2010
