= Aldington, Worcestershire =

Village in Worcestershire, England

Coordinates: 52.0960°N 1.9078°W

Aldington
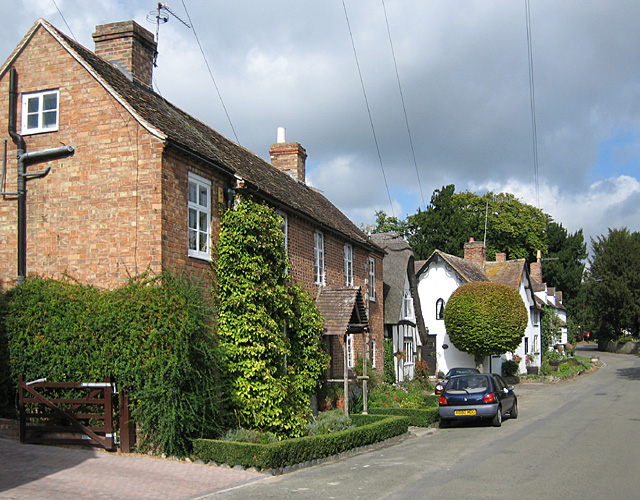
- Aldington village

- Location within Worcestershire
- Population: 232
- OS grid reference: SP064440
  - London: 87 miles (140 km)
- Civil parish: Aldington
- District: Wychavon
- Shire county: Worcestershire
- Region: West Midlands
- Country: England
- Sovereign state: United Kingdom
- Post town: EVESHAM
- Postcode district: WR11
- Dialling code: 01386
- Police: West Mercia
- Fire: Hereford and Worcester
- Ambulance: West Midlands
- UK Parliament: Mid Worcestershire

Aldington is a village and civil parish in the Wychavon district of Worcestershire, England. It is about three miles east of Evesham, and according to the census of 2001, had a population of 232. The name Aldington derives from the Old English Ealdaingtūn meaning 'settlement connected with Ealda'.
