= Naunton Beauchamp =

Village in Worcestershire, England

Coordinates: 52.169311°N 2.055121°W

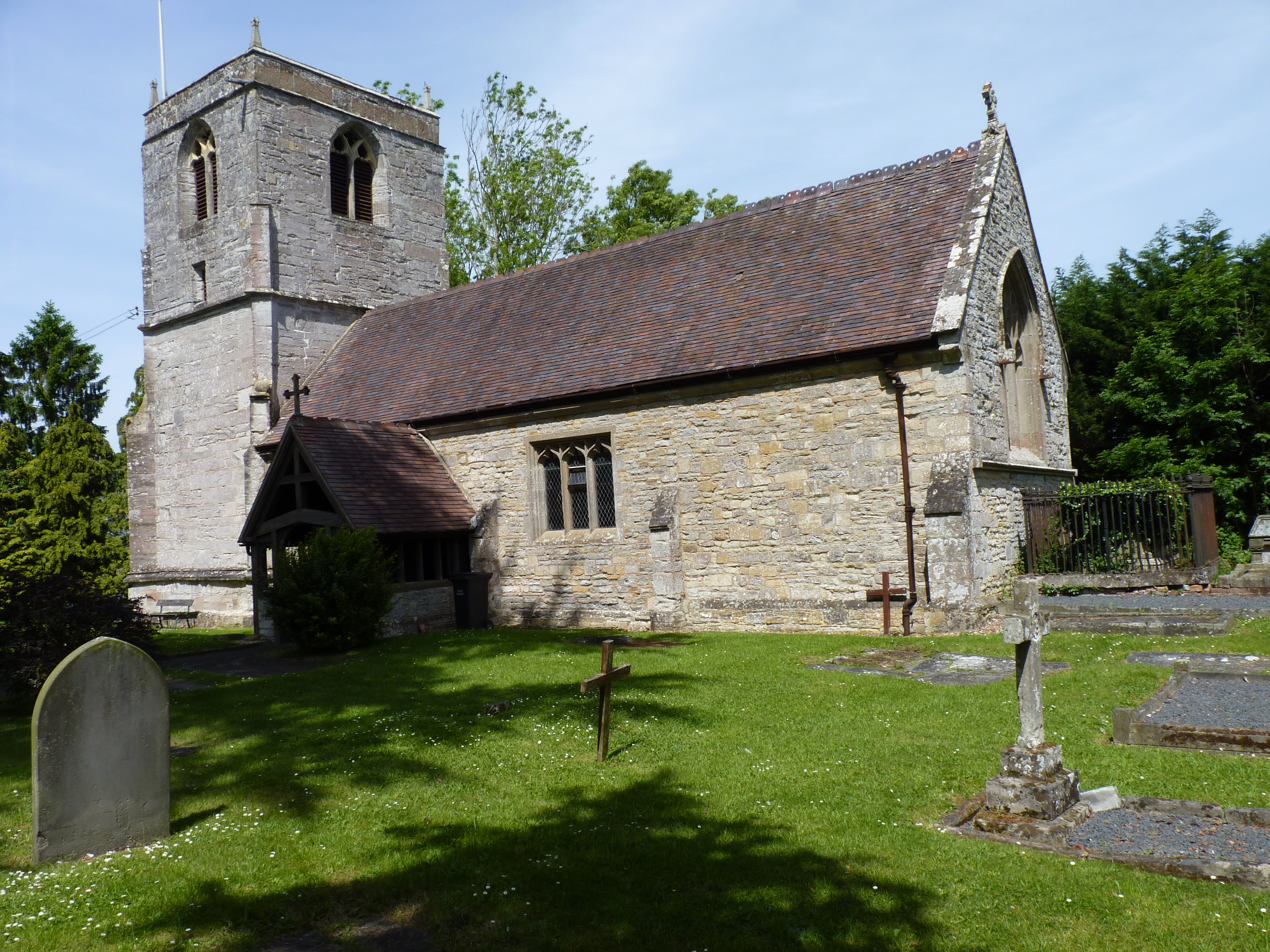
- St Bartholomew's Church, Naunton Beauchamp

- Location within Worcestershire
- Population: 293 (2021)
- OS grid reference: SO963523
- District: Wychavon
- Shire county: Worcestershire
- Region: West Midlands
- Country: England
- Sovereign state: United Kingdom
- Post town: Pershore
- Postcode district: WR10
- Dialling code: 01386
- Police: West Mercia
- Fire: Hereford and Worcester
- Ambulance: West Midlands

Naunton Beauchamp is a village and is also a civil parish within Wychavon district in Worcestershire, England. It is in the east of the county, about four and a half miles from Pershore and nine miles from Worcester. The civil parish population was 293 at the 2021 census.

Naunton Beauchamp's church, St. Bartholomew C of E Church is a Grade II* listed building and it was listed on 11 February 1965.

The name Naunton derives from the Old English nīwetūn meaning 'new settlement'. The affix Beauchamp derives from the Beauchamp family, who held land in the village in the 11th century.
