= Offenham =

Village in Worcestershire, England

Coordinates: 52.1157°N 1.9237°W

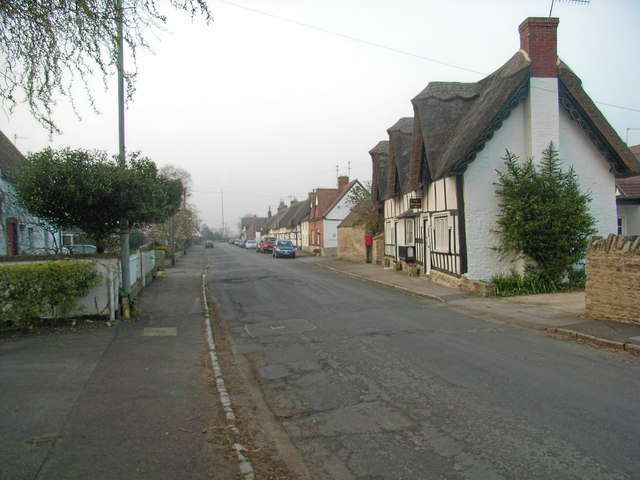
- Main Street, Offenham

- Location within Worcestershire
- Population: 1,644
- OS grid reference: SP0546
- Civil parish: Offenham
- District: Wychavon
- Shire county: Worcestershire
- Region: West Midlands
- Country: England
- Sovereign state: United Kingdom
- Post town: EVESHAM
- Postcode district: WR11
- Dialling code: 01386
- Police: West Mercia
- Fire: Hereford and Worcester
- Ambulance: West Midlands
- UK Parliament: Droitwich and Evesham

Offenham is a large rural village and civil parish in the Wychavon district of Worcestershire, England, located about three miles east of Evesham, in the Vale of Evesham. The River Avon flows through Offenham. The civil parish extends beyond the area of the settlement of Offenham and includes Blackminster Middle School and the Blackminster Trading Estate. The civil parish population was 1,644 in 2021. Offenham was awarded the title of Calor Worcestershire Village of the Year in 2004.

== History ==
The name Offenham derives from the Old English meaning 'village' or 'hemmed-in land' of Uffa/Offa.

Offenham was founded as a monastic grange and medieval deer park by the Benedictine Abbots of Evesham Abbey in the 13th century, the old grange stood where Court Farm now stands. The grange was established to enclose the large flocks of sheep needed by the Abbots to trade wool with Flanders. During the Dissolution of the Monasteries the grange became crown property and Henry VIII granted both Offenham and Evesham to Philip Hoby, one of his English Ambassadors. The grange and park later became the property of the Hazelwood family until the mid-18th century when it was sub-divided, by this time the village had formed an adequate farming and market gardening community.

== Maypole ==
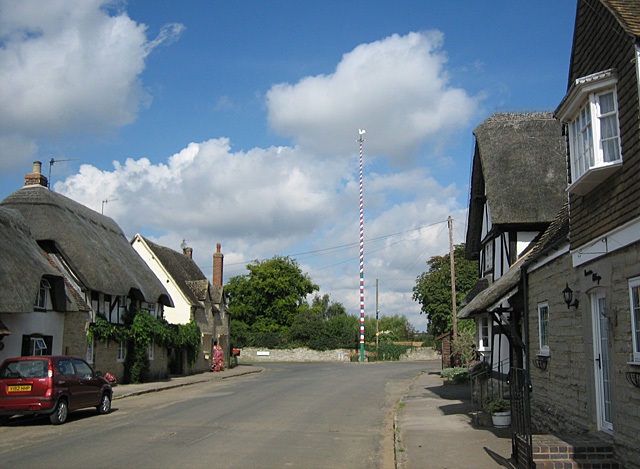
Offenham Maypole

Offenham village is noted for its 64 ft maypole, the tallest of only six permanent maypoles remaining in England. On May Day there is maypole dancing, morris dancing and the crowning of the Queen of the May. It is not known for how long Offenham has had a maypole but the tradition dates back to medieval times.

== St. Mary & St. Milburgh Church ==
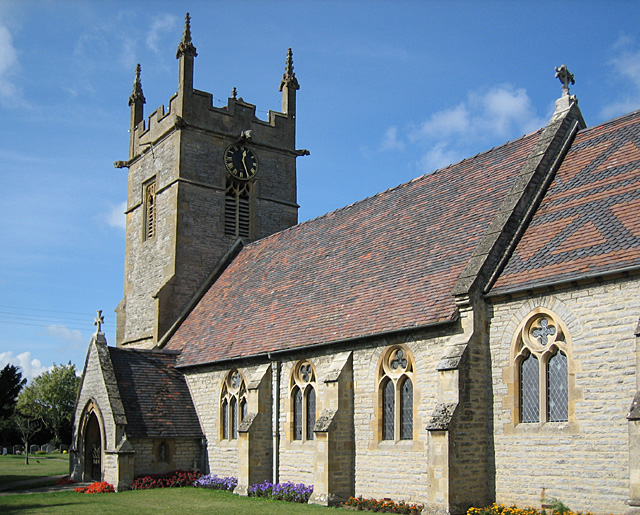
Offenham Church

The village church was built in 1538 and rebuilt in 1861/2 by Frederick Preedy who was born in Offenham in 1820.

- Offenham Church Website
