= Badsey =

Village in Worcestershire, England

Coordinates: 52.08°N 1.89°W

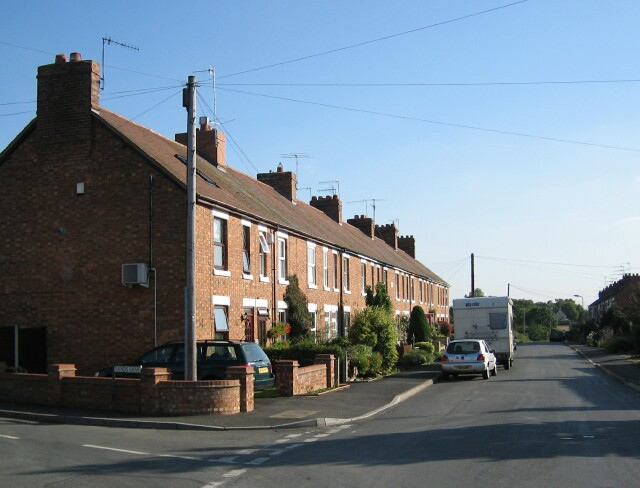
- Terraced houses in Badsey

- Location within Worcestershire
- Population: 2,844 (2021 census)
- OS grid reference: SP072431
  - London: 87 miles (140 km)
- Civil parish: Badsey
- District: Wychavon
- Shire county: Worcestershire
- Region: West Midlands
- Country: England
- Sovereign state: United Kingdom
- Post town: EVESHAM
- Postcode district: WR11
- Dialling code: 01386
- Police: West Mercia
- Fire: Hereford and Worcester
- Ambulance: West Midlands
- UK Parliament: Droitwich and Evesham

Badsey is a village and civil parish in the Wychavon district of Worcestershire, England. It has two parks and a small first school located in the centre of the village. Its population was 2,844 in 2021.

== Location ==
The village of Badsey is located about two miles east of Evesham, in the Vale of Evesham. It lies close to the River Avon. According to the 2001 census the Badsey ward had a population of 2,657, by 2021 this had risen to 2,844.

== Amenities and history ==
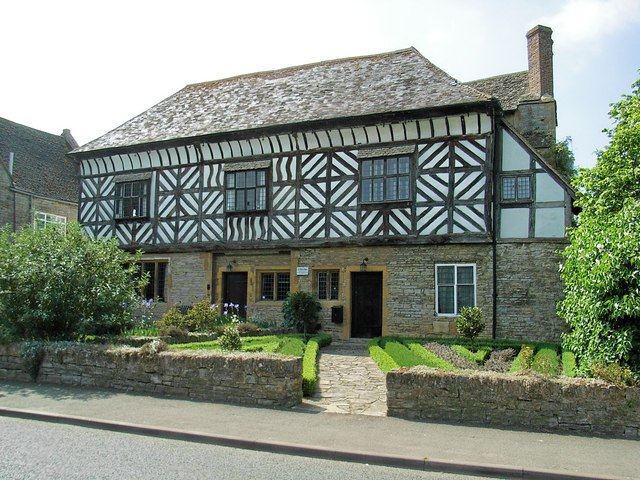
The Manor House, 4 & 6 High Street

Badsey has a long and rich history dating back to at least Roman times. In a charter of 709, the village was referred to as Baddesia (Baeddi's Island). The floods of 2007 remind us of how Badsey came to get its name when the village became an island for one night.

The Domesday Book of 1086 tells us that there were 12 villagers (likely to mean households or smallholdings) with 8 ploughs, 4 slaves and one widow living in Badsey. The reference to 8 plough teams implies that arable farming was already well established. The first stone church was probably built at Badsey in the 11th century. In the Middle Ages, the main landowner was the church. Following the dissolution of Evesham Abbey, the Dean and Chapter of Christ Church, Oxford became rectors and patrons of the parish in 1546, roles they still hold as well as being substantial landowners there.

Agriculture has been the main occupation of the village for most of its history. At the beginning of the 19th century, the old open field system gave way to a more enclosed landscape which suited the agricultural revolution which was taking place, but changed the landscape irrevocably. The predominant occupation of the 19th century continued to be agriculture with over 70% of the working population was engaged in agriculture.

In the 1870s, the great agricultural depression began to hit the country, but for Badsey, this coincided with the advent of market gardening, introducing a new, prosperous chapter for the village. Whereas many villages at this time witnessed a drift of people away from the village to the town, the opposite was true in Badsey. Two big sales of farmland took place in 1866, which helped the spread of market gardening. The new landowners divided the land into strips which they then let to former farm labourers. These men started market gardening on their own account. By the time that three further sales of farmland took place in the early 1890s, the newly emerging market gardeners seized the opportunity to buy an acre or two of land. A housing boom took place as many new houses were built. The former "Ag Labs" now knew a wealth they could never formerly have expected. The opening of the railway station in 1884 opened up the markets and the Littleton & Badsey Growers' co-operative was founded in 1908 to assist market gardeners. Badsey and the Vale of Evesham became famous, particularly for the asparagus which was grown here. In a hundred years, the population of Badsey and Aldington had more than tripled as more people moved to the area to take up market gardening. By 1911, 80% of households were involved in market gardening.

During the Second World War the village became home to evacuees sent from the Handsworth New Road School in Birmingham. The decline in market gardening began after the Second World War. In common with villages elsewhere, there have been numerous changes in the post-war period, with significant housing development. There is a school, two pubs, a shop and post office, and a multitude of clubs and activities to choose from.

The old manor house, a Grade II* listed building, still stands on the village High Street. It is half-timbered, black and white and today is a private residence. It dates mainly from the 16th century, restored in the 1940s. The village and parish church is dedicated to St. James. The village has a Spar shop (open 7 days a week) with a post office located inside. The two local pubs are called the Wheatsheaf Inn and the Round Of Gras.

== Notable residents ==
- English cricketer Daryl Mitchell was born in Badsey.
- Comedian Alistair McGowan was also born in the village and attended Badsey First School.
- Conservative MP Nigel Huddleston lives in Badsey.

== See also ==
- Littleton and Badsey railway station
