= Wychavon =

Coordinates: 52.114°N 2.081°W

Wychavon District
- Non-metropolitan district
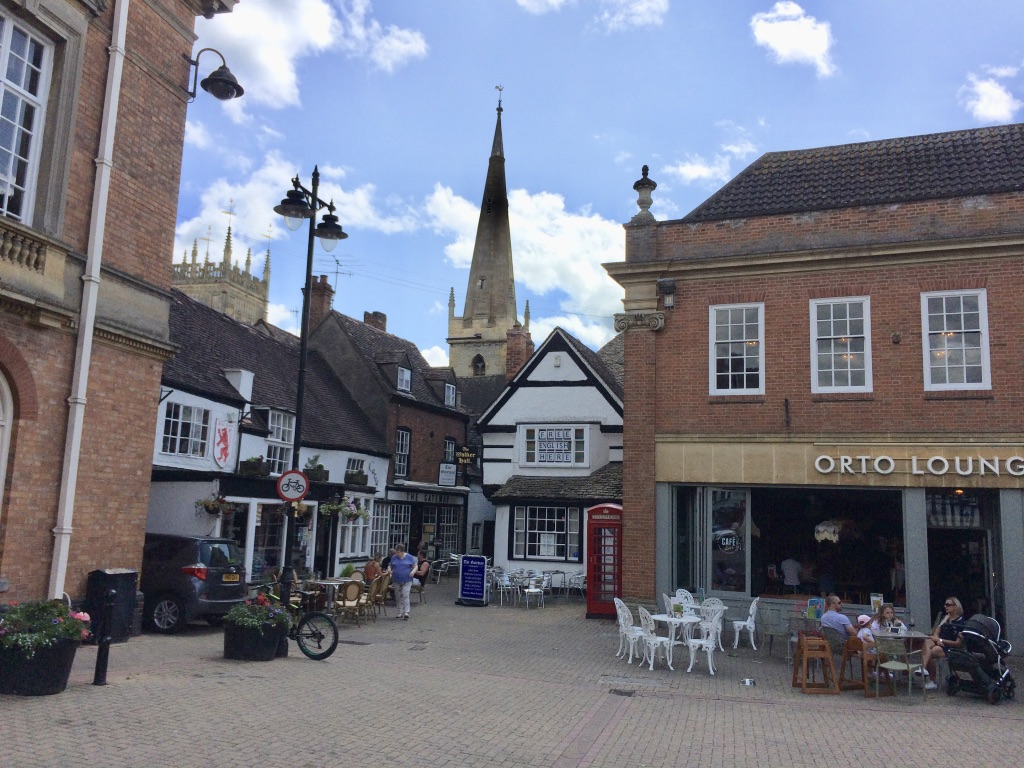
- Evesham, the district's largest town

- Wychavon shown within Worcestershire
- Sovereign state: United Kingdom
- Constituent country: England
- Region: West Midlands
- Non-metropolitan county: Worcestershire
- Status: Non-metropolitan district
- Admin HQ: Pershore
- Incorporated: 1 April 1974

Government
  - Type: Non-metropolitan district council
  - Body: Wychavon District Council
  - Leadership: Leader & Cabinet (Conservative)
  - MPs: Harriett Baldwin (Conservative); Chris Bloore (Labour); Nigel Huddleston (Conservative)

Area
  - Total: 256.2 sq mi (663.5 km^{2})
  - Rank: 50th (of 296)

Population (2025)
  - Total: 139,175
  - Rank: 174th (of 296)
  - Density: 543.3/sq mi (209.8/km^{2})

Ethnicity (2021)
  - Ethnic groups: List: 96.9% White; 1.2% Mixed; 1.1% Asian; 0.5% other; 0.3% Black

Religion (2021)
  - Religion: List: 57.7% Christianity; 35% no religion; 0.5% Islam; 0.2% Hinduism; 0.1% Judaism; 0.3% Sikhism; 0.3% Buddhism; 0.4% other; 5.6% not stated
- Time zone: UTC0 (GMT)
  - Summer (DST): UTC+1 (BST)
- ONS code: 47UF (ONS) />E07000238 (GSS)
- OS grid reference: SO9445346235

Wychavon (/ˈwɪtʃ.eɪvən/) is a local government district in Worcestershire, England. The largest towns in the district are Evesham and Droitwich Spa; the council is based in the town of Pershore. The district also includes numerous villages and surrounding rural areas, and includes part of the Cotswolds, a designated National Landscape. The district's name references the Saxon Kingdom of Hwicce and the River Avon. The population in 2025 was 139,175.

The neighbouring districts are Malvern Hills, Worcester, Wyre Forest, Bromsgrove, Redditch, Stratford-on-Avon, Cotswold, and Tewkesbury.

== History ==
The district was created on 1 April 1974 under the Local Government Act 1972, covering the area of five former districts, which were all abolished at the same time:

- Droitwich Municipal Borough
- Droitwich Rural District (except parish of Warndon, which went to Worcester)
- Evesham Municipal Borough
- Evesham Rural District
- Pershore Rural District (except parish of St Peter the Great County, which went to Worcester)

The name Wychavon was coined for the new district. "Wych" phonetically recalls the Saxon Kingdom of Hwicce, and "Avon" is for the River Avon.

== Abolition ==
Under current local government reorganisation plans, all district councils in Worcestershire, as well as the county council, will be abolished in 2028, with the district forming part of a new South Worcestershire unitary authority, also including the area of the Worcester and Malvern Hills districts.

== Governance ==
Wychavon District Council

Type
- Type: Non-metropolitan district

Leadership
- Chair: Gregory Wilkins, Conservative since 13 May 2026
- Leader: Richard Morris, Conservative since 14 May 2025
- Chief Executive: Vic Allison since 1 August 2020

Structure
- Seats: 43 councillors
- Graph of the party split among 43 seats.
- Political groups: Administration (26) Conservative (26) Other parties (17) Liberal Democrats (8) Green (6) Reform (1) Labour (1) Independent (1)
- Length of term: 4 years

Elections
- Voting system: First-past-the-post
- Last election: 4 May 2023

Meeting place
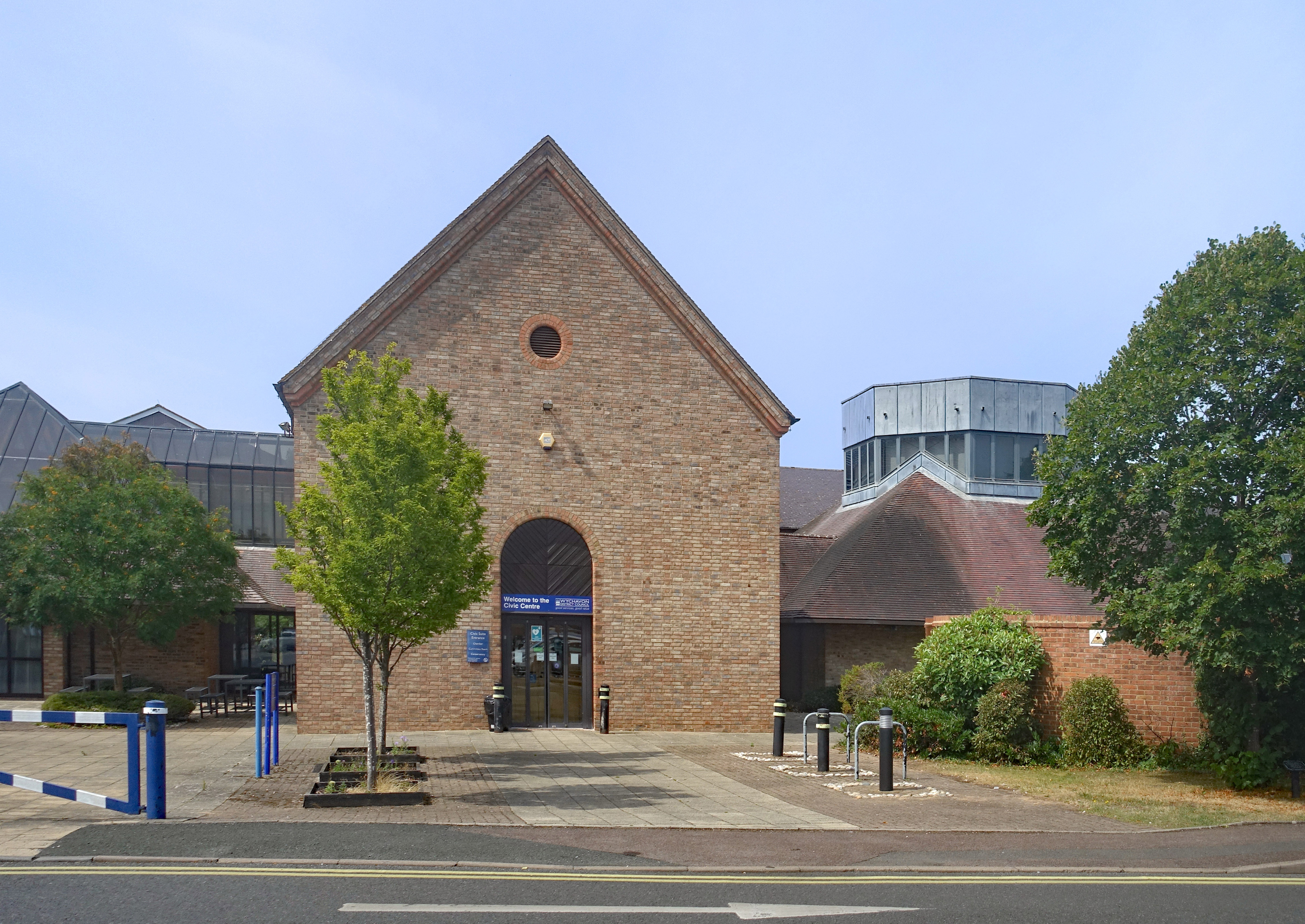
- Pershore Civic Centre, Queen Elizabeth Drive, Pershore, WR10 1PT

Website
- www.wychavon.gov.uk

Wychavon District Council provides district-level services. County-level services are provided by Worcestershire County Council. The whole district is covered by civil parishes, which form a third tier of local government.

Since 2014 the council has shared a chief executive and other staff with neighbouring Malvern Hills District Council.

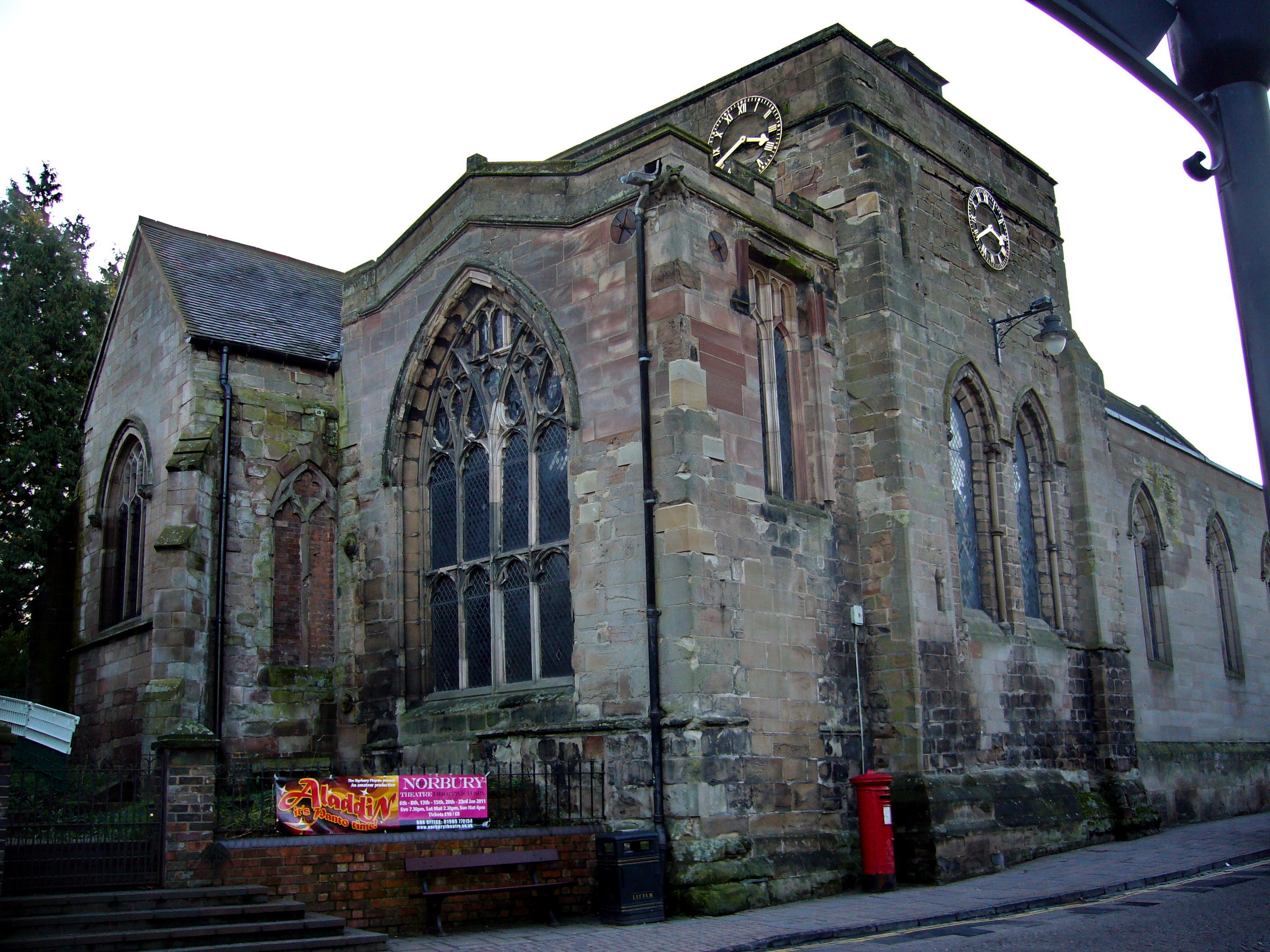
Droitwich Spa, the district's second-largest town

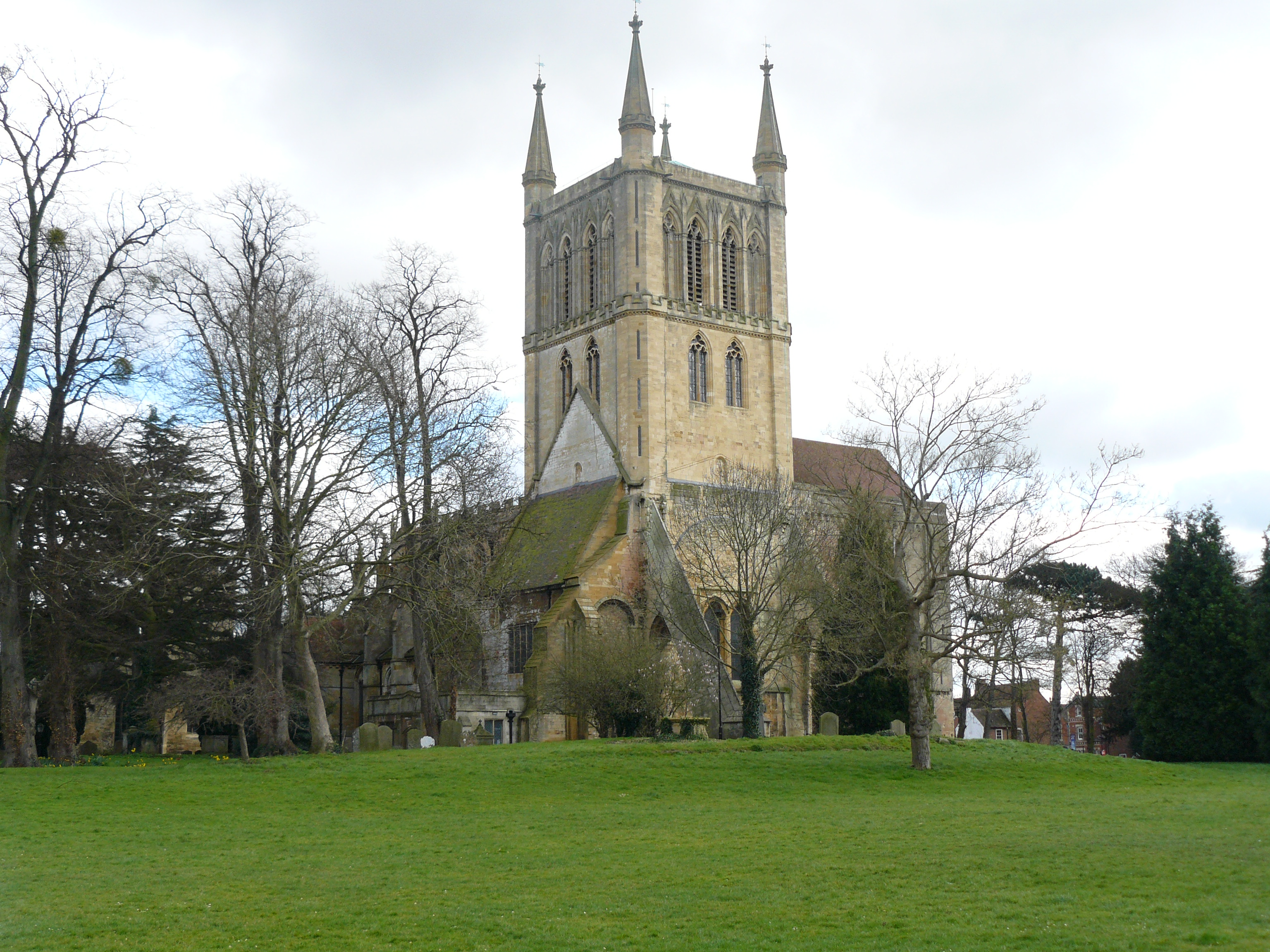
Pershore, known for Pershore Abbey is the third-largest settlement and the administrative centre of the district

=== Political control ===
The council has been under Conservative majority control since 1999.

The first election to the council was held in 1973, initially operating as a shadow authority alongside the outgoing authorities until it came into its powers on 1 April 1974. Political control of the council since 1974 has been as follows:

| Party in control | Years |
|---|---|
| Independent | 1974–1983 |
| No overall control | 1983–1987 |
| Conservative | 1987–1995 |
| No overall control | 1995–1999 |
| Conservative | 1999–present |

=== Leadership ===
The leaders of the council since 1999 have been:

| Councillor | Party | From | To |
|---|---|---|---|
| John Grantham | Liberal Democrats | | May 1999 |
| Malcolm Meikle | Conservative | May 1999 | 19 May 2003 |
| Martin Jennings | Conservative | 19 May 2003 | May 2007 |
| Paul Middlebrough | Conservative | 22 May 2007 | 20 May 2015 |
| Linda Robinson | Conservative | 20 May 2015 | Oct 2018 |
| Bradley Thomas | Conservative | 7 Nov 2018 | 18 Oct 2023 |
| Christopher Day | Conservative | 18 Oct 2023 | 14 May 2025 |
| Richard Morris | Conservative | 14 May 2025 | |

=== Composition ===
Following the 2023 election, and subsequent changes of allegiance up to August 2026, the composition of the council was:

| Party | Seats |
|---|---|
| Conservative | 26 |
| Liberal Democrats | 8 |
| Green | 6 |
| Reform | 1 |
| Labour | 1 |
| Independent | 1 |
| Total | 43 |

=== Elections ===
Since the last boundary changes in 2023 the council has comprised 43 councillors representing 27 wards, each electing one, two or three councillors. Elections are held every four years.

=== Premises ===
The council is based at Pershore Civic Centre on Queen Elizabeth Drive, which was purpose-built for the council in 1991. The council also maintains offices in Droitwich and Evesham.

== Civil parishes ==
The whole district is divided into 73 civil parishes, of which 66 have parish councils and 7 have parish meetings. The parish councils for Droitwich Spa, Evesham and Pershore have declared their parishes to be towns, allowing them to take the style "town council". Broadway is a post town, but has not been declared a town by its parish council. The Wychavon district includes the following civil parishes:

- Abberton Parish Meeting
- Abbots Morton Parish Council
- Ashton under Hill Parish Council
- Badsey and Aldington Parish Council
- Beckford Parish Council
- Bickmarsh Parish Meeting
- Birlingham Parish Council
- Bishampton and Throckmorton Parish Council
- Bredicot Parish Meeting
- Bredon, Bredon's Norton and Westmancote Parish Council
- Bretforton Parish Council
- Broadway Parish Council
- Broughton Hackett Parish Meeting
- Charlton Parish Council
- Childswickham Parish Council
- Churchill Parish Meeting
- Cleeve Prior Parish Council
- Cookhill Parish Council
- Cropthorne Parish Council
- Crowle Parish Council
- Defford and Besford Parish Council
- Dodderhill Parish Council
- Drakes Broughton and Wadborough with Pirton Parish Council
- Droitwich Spa Town Council
- Eckington Parish Council
- Elmbridge Parish Council
- Elmley Castle, Bricklehampton and Netherton Parish Council
- Elmley Lovett Parish Council
- Evesham Town Council
- Fladbury Parish Council
- Flyford Flavell, Grafton Flyford and North Piddle Parish Council
- Great Comberton Parish Council
- Hadzor, Himbleton, Huddington and Oddingley (Saleway) Parish Council
- Hampton Lovett and Westwood Parish Council
- Hanbury Parish Council
- Hartlebury Parish Council
- Harvington Parish Council
- Hill and Moor Parish Council
- Hindlip, Martin Hussingtree and Salwarpe Parish Council
- Hinton-on-the-Green and Aston Somerville Parish Council
- Honeybourne Parish Council
- Inkberrow Parish Council
- Kemerton Parish Council
- Kington and Dormston Parish Council
- Little Comberton Parish Council
- Naunton Beauchamp Parish Council
- North and Middle Littleton Parish Council
- North Claines Parish Council
- Norton and Lenchwick Parish Council
- Norton-juxta-Kempsey Parish Council
- Offenham Parish Council
- Ombersley and Doverdale Parish Council
- Overbury and Conderton Parish Council
- Pebworth Parish Council
- Peopleton Parish Council
- Pershore Town Council
- Pinvin Parish Council
- Rous Lench Parish Council
- Sedgeberrow Parish Council
- South Littleton Parish Council
- Spetchley Parish Meeting
- South Lenches Parish Council
- Stock and Bradley Parish Council
- Stoulton Parish Council
- Strensham Parish Council
- Tibberton Parish Council
- Upton Snodsbury Parish Council
- Upton Warren Parish Council
- White Ladies Aston Parish Meeting
- Whittington Parish Council
- Wick Parish Council
- Wickhamford Parish Council
- Wyre Piddle Parish Council
