= Flyford Flavell =

Village in Worcestershire, England

Coordinates: 52.193153°N 2.031655°W

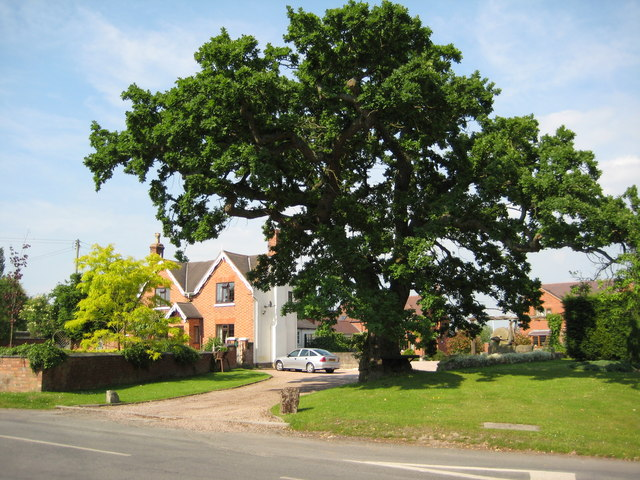

- Location within Worcestershire
- Population: 254
- District: Wychavon
- Shire county: Worcestershire
- Region: West Midlands
- Country: England
- Sovereign state: United Kingdom
- Post town: Worcester
- Postcode district: WR7
- Police: West Mercia
- Fire: Hereford and Worcester
- Ambulance: West Midlands
- UK Parliament: Droitwich and Evesham

Flyford Flavell is a village in Worcestershire. It has a traditional pub in the centre of the village adjacent to the village green and a primary school (rated Good by Ofsted in November 2016). A garage and another pub lie on the periphery of the village and the nearest shop is 3 miles. The name Flyford is of unknown origin. The second element is thought to derive from the Old English fyrhð meaning 'wood'. The first element could possibly derive from the personal name Flaede, but the exact origin is not known. The affix Flavell is an Anglo-Norman rendering of the village's name, used to distinguish it from nearby Grafton Flyford.
