= Tibberton, Worcestershire =

Village in Worcestershire, England

Coordinates: 52.213°N 2.142°W

Tibberton
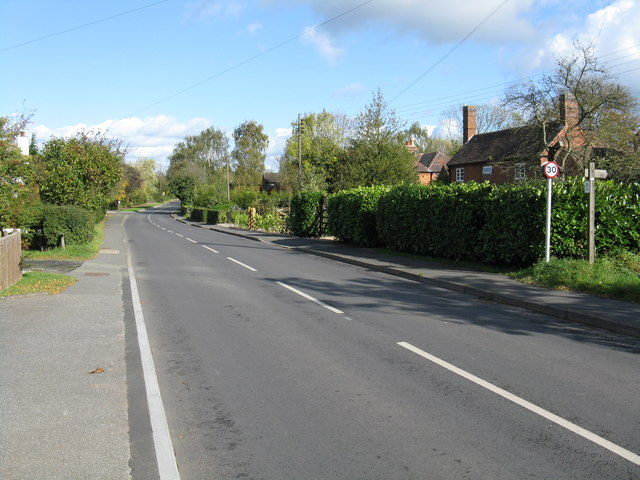
- Tibberton - ribbon development

- Location within Worcestershire
- Population: 671 (2021 census)
- OS grid reference: SO903572
- Civil parish: Tibberton
- District: Wychavon
- Shire county: Worcestershire
- Region: West Midlands
- Country: England
- Sovereign state: United Kingdom
- Post town: Droitwich
- Postcode district: WR9
- Dialling code: 01905
- Police: West Mercia
- Fire: Hereford and Worcester
- Ambulance: West Midlands

Tibberton is a village and civil parish in Worcestershire, England. It is located around 4 miles north-east of Worcester and less than a mile from junction 6 of the M5 motorway. The Worcester and Birmingham Canal passes just to the north of the village. Its population was 671 in 2021.

A number of archeological surveys have been carried out in the modern period in anticipation of modernization projects. These investigations reveal varying degrees of human presence from the prehistoric period. In 2010 an archeological survey was carried out near Pershore Lane close to the M5, less than a mile from the center of the village. This investigation uncovered Neolithic and Bronze age activity suggesting the clearing of woodland, and timberworks that may have formed timber tracks across grasslands. Radio-carbon dating places the activity in the Late Bronze Age to Early Iron Age period.

An excavation of Hawthorn Rise, on the northern edge of the village and near the canal, was carried out in 2017 in advance of a new housing development. This investigation revealed human artifacts ranging from the prehistoric to medieval periods, mostly focused on two ditches that were likely opened up in the Middle Iron Age (400-100 BCE) and closed in the Late Iron Age (100-50 BCE). While inconclusive, the archeological evidence suggests the possibility of a large enclosure on the hill indicative of other Iron Age settlements in the region. Fabrics (pottery sherds) from nearby Droitwich were discovered connecting the site to the saltworks there. From at least the Roman period Droitwich was active in the extraction of salt.

The name Tibberton derives from the Old English Tidbeorhttūn meaning 'Tidbeorht's settlement'.

Tibberton was once known as Tidbrichtingtone and formerly belonged to the bishop of Worcester's manor of Northwick. Ownership was subsequently passed to the Priory of Worcester.

Tibberton was included in the Worcester folio of the Domesday Book survey of 1086. It is listed as a holding of Northwick, within the Hundred of Oswaldslow. The tenant in chief both in 1066 and 1086 was the bishop of Worcester. At the time of survey there were 13 villagers, 18 smallholders, 8 slaves and 2 others, which formed 4 lord's plough teams and 18 men's plough teams. It also contained a fishery and salthouse.

The unusual dedication of Tibberton's Church of England parish church to St. Peter ad Vincula ("St. Peter in Chains") is derived from the ancient Basilica of San Pietro in Vincoli in Rome. A poem was associated with the church stating "A stone church, a wooden steeple. A drunken parson, a wicked people."
