= Evolution of Worcestershire county boundaries since 1844 =

Coordinates: 52.06°N 1.60°W

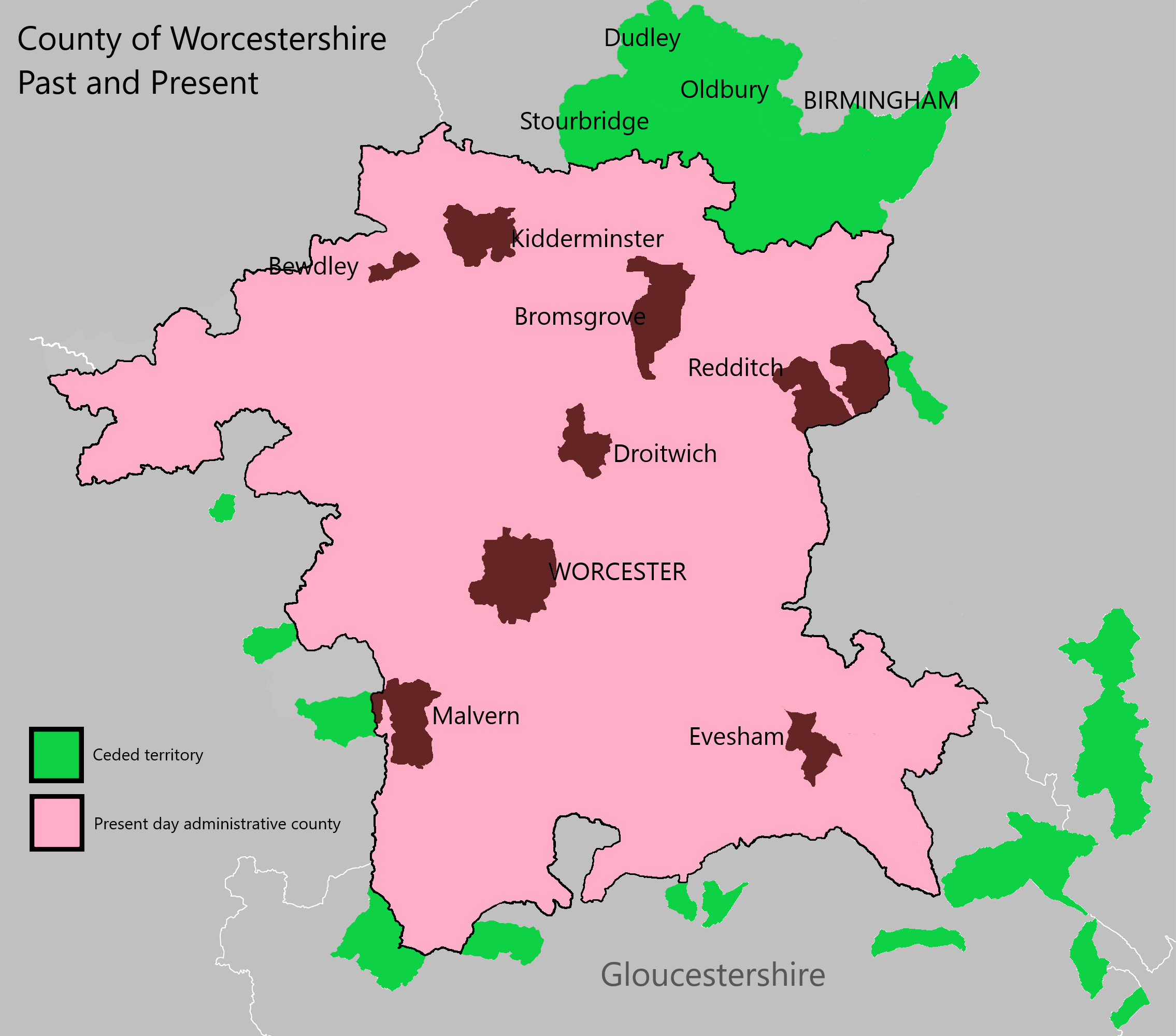
Modern Worcestershire set against a backdrop of territory ceded to surrounding or new counties since 1844. Image includes territory gained from surrounding counties since 1844.

The administrative boundaries of Worcestershire, England have been fluid for over 150 years since the first major changes in 1844. There were many detached parts of Worcestershire in the surrounding counties, and conversely there were islands of other counties within Worcestershire. The Counties (Detached Parts) Act 1844 began the process of eliminating these, but the process was not completed until 1966, when Dudley was absorbed into Staffordshire.

The expansion of Birmingham and the Black Country during and after the Industrial Revolution also altered the county map considerably. Local government commissions were set up to recommend changes to the local government structures, and as early as 1945 recommendations were made to merge Worcestershire with Herefordshire. Eventually in 1974, a form of this recommendation was carried out, most of Worcestershire was combined with Herefordshire to form a new county named Hereford and Worcester, while the northern Black Country towns and villages of Worcestershire, along with adjoining areas of Staffordshire and Warwickshire, formed the new administrative county of West Midlands.

Hereford and Worcester was re-divided into the separate counties of Herefordshire and Worcestershire in 1998. Since that time Worcestershire's boundaries have not changed. Redditch opted to join the West Midlands Combined Authority as an associate 'non-constituent' member in October 2015, although this will not affect the borough's status within Worcestershire.

On 1 April 2028, the existing administrative county will be abolished and succeeded by two new unitary authorities that will assume the roles currently carried out by the county and district councils: North Worcestershire Council and South Worcestershire Council.

== Boundaries before 1844 ==
=== The See of Worcester ===
Worcestershire was established during the heptarchy, as an administrative and defensive unit in the early 10th century. Its purpose was to take into account and defend the estates within the northern area of the historic See of Worcester, held by the Episcopus Hwicciorum and Worcester Priory, along with the abbeys of Pershore and Evesham. No fewer than thirteen monastic foundations existed in the area, between the 8th and 13th centuries. Worcester itself contained two monasteries in the tenth century; the original bishopric seat, dedicated to Ss. Peter and Paul and a newer priory dedicated to St. Mary. A 'proto-shire' was believed to exist prior to the county formation, centred upon a fortified burh. The boundaries for this 'proto-shire' (and the early established county) are unknown, although the See of Worcester already owned a considerable amount of land. The burgs were defensible walled towns which had been developed by Alfred the Great, to protect against advancement of the Great Heathen Army. Worcester's strategically dominant position upon the undulating plains of the River Severn, an important role as an ecclesiastical centre and also the chief point of trade and military communications between the Anglo-Saxon and Welsh kingdoms, rendered it a logical location to serve as a burh. The fortification of Worcester, took place between 872 and 899 by Æthelred of Mercia, with the assent of King Alfred and the Mercian Witan. The shires and its hundreds, formed a framework for administering the resources of each burh's outlying estates.

The shiring of the See of Worcester also led to the formation of Gloucestershire – initially centred along the Severn Vale and Vale of Berkeley, through to the Mouth of the Severn. In the east, Arden became part of Warwickshire, and Winchcombeshire straddled an area bounded by the River Avon, Vale of Evesham and the Cotswold Hills. Winchcombeshire's existence was short-lived, and most of its parishes were absorbed into Gloucestershire upon dissolution. However, by the time of Domesday, some of Winchcombeshire's hypothesised former parishes were surveyed as detached exclaves of Worcestershire's Oswaldslow hundred.

=== The High Sheriff of Staffordshire ===
By the time of Domesday, many of Worcestershire's exclaves in the south-east of the shire were already established. Meanwhile, to the north; during Cnut's conquest of Anglo-Saxon England in 1015–16, Mercia was in turmoil and was invaded by Vikings, who seized territory "through force and fraud and secular power". This turmoil encouraged existing Anglo-Saxon gentry (and those who were allied to Cnut or Wessex) to take territory at will. In 1016 Clent and Tardebigge were seized or 'farmed' by 'Æfic', the Sheriff of Staffordshire, thus becoming exclaves of Kingswinford Manor. Dudley was also detached from Worcestershire during this period, and became an exclave entirely surrounded by Staffordshire. However, Dudley also possessed its own 'satellite exclave' – a strip of woodland, to the west of Dudley Castle Hill.

It is not known exactly how much territory of Worcestershire was seized by Æfic and his successors in the late Anglo-Saxon period. The emergence of exclaves and enclaves in and around North Worcestershire, was in tandem with the appearance of Oswaldslow's exclaves to the south-east of the shire.

More parishes and manors changed hands over the coming decades through conquest or as 'gifts', some becoming enclaves within adjoining jurisdictions. The aftermath of the Norman invasion of England in 1066 saw gifts of land and titles from William the Conqueror to his allies and friends. According to the Domesday Book, Duke William gave Dudley and other manors such as Selly Oak, Bartley Green, Northfield, Frankley, and Bromsgrove (Willingwick) to Ansculf de Picquigny, Sheriff of Buckinghamshire, and Hala to Roger de Montgomerie, who became Earl of Shrewsbury. Whilst Doddingtree Hundred was gifted to Raoul II of Tosny, seigneur de Conches-en-Ouche, Ranulph de Mortimer, and Osbern fitzRichard. Despite the Norman conquest, the rest of the county was still held by the Abbeys of Pershore and Evesham, the Bishop of Worcester and Priory.

=== Worcestershire's hundreds ===
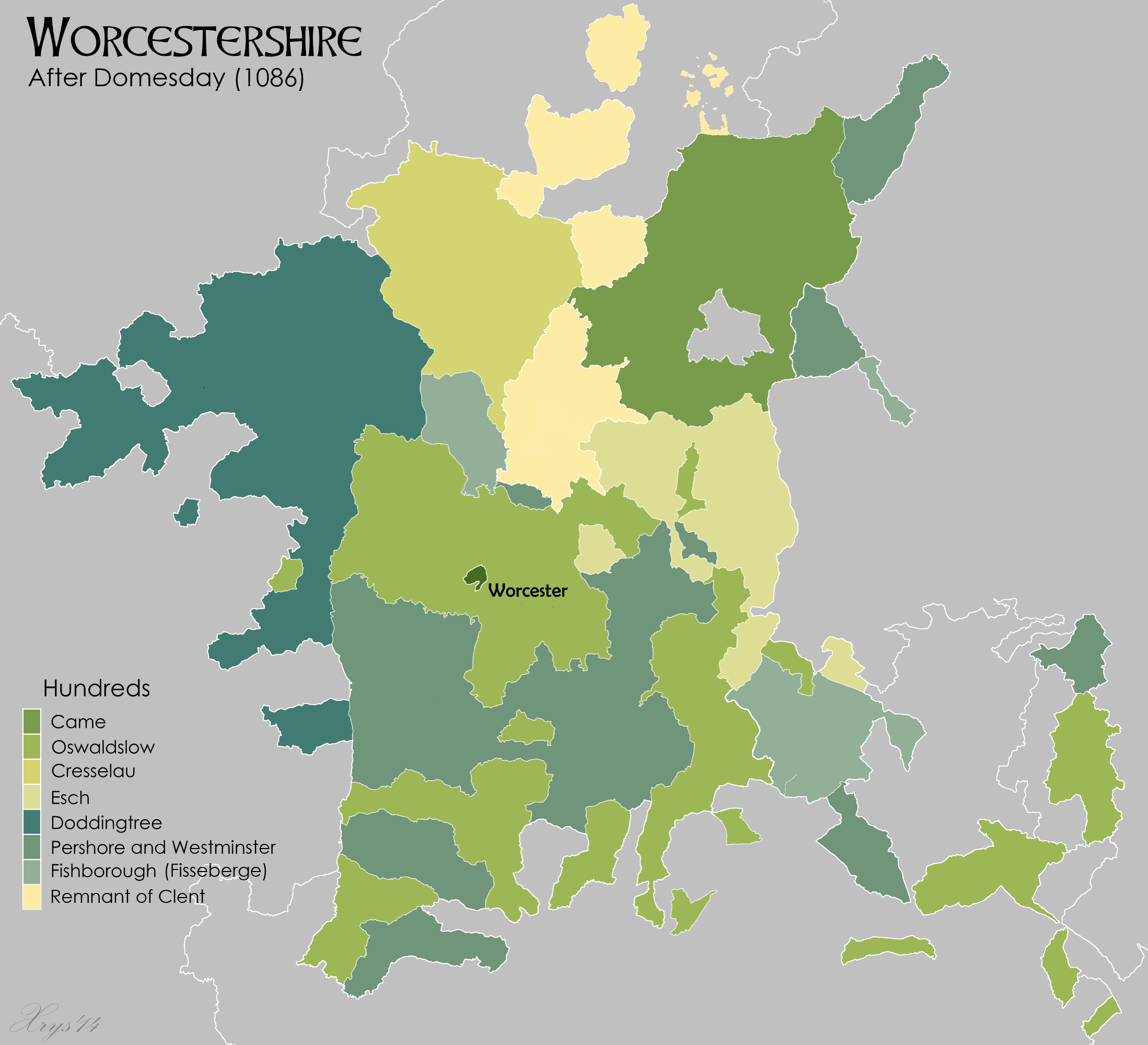
Fig 1. An interpretation of Worcestershire's Hundreds after Domesday (1086). Halfshire has not been created, although Oswaldslow was already in existence and Clent, Hala and Tardebigge were surveyed under Worcestershire, despite removal from the county.

The early story of Worcestershire's initial twelve hundreds – Came, Clent, Cresselau, Cuthburgelow (Cuthbergehlawe), Doddingtree, Esch, Fishborough (Fisseberge), Pershore (along with the Abbot of Westminster's unnamed double hundred of displaced lands), Winburgetreow, and Wulfereslaw, is largely unknown, including when they were established. Cuthburgelow, Winburgetreow and Wulfereslaw became the triple-hundred of Oswaldslow by 1086, administering the lands long held by the Bishop of Worcester and Priory. Pershore's lands had been granted to the Abbot of Westminster during the reign of Edward the Confessor, thus becoming a triple-hundred. Halfshire or Dimidii Comitatus de Wych (Half of Wych(e)) was formed before 1175–76; from an amalgamation of Came, Esch (except the possessions of Evesham Abbey, which became part of Blakenhurst) and the remnants of Clent, and consisted of land primarily owned by the Crown and Ansculf de Picquigny's successors. Halfshire was also known as the hundred of Dudley in 1275. Doddingtree also belonged to the Crown, whilst Fishborough/Fisseberge became known as Blakenhurst, who had a constant struggle to retain its lands from theft and conquest. In seven of the shires twelve hundreds the Crown and its designated official, the High Sheriff of Worcestershire, had no authority. The Crown's authority was replaced by the Bishop of Worcester and the Abbots at Pershore, Westminster and Evesham. This situation caused challenges within the legal framework and as acts of aggression where land was seized by force, or theft. The gradual amalgamation of the initial twelve hundreds into five, plus the changing ownership of parishes and manors over the centuries created a very fractured layout.

=== Warley Wigorn, Cradley and Bewdley ===
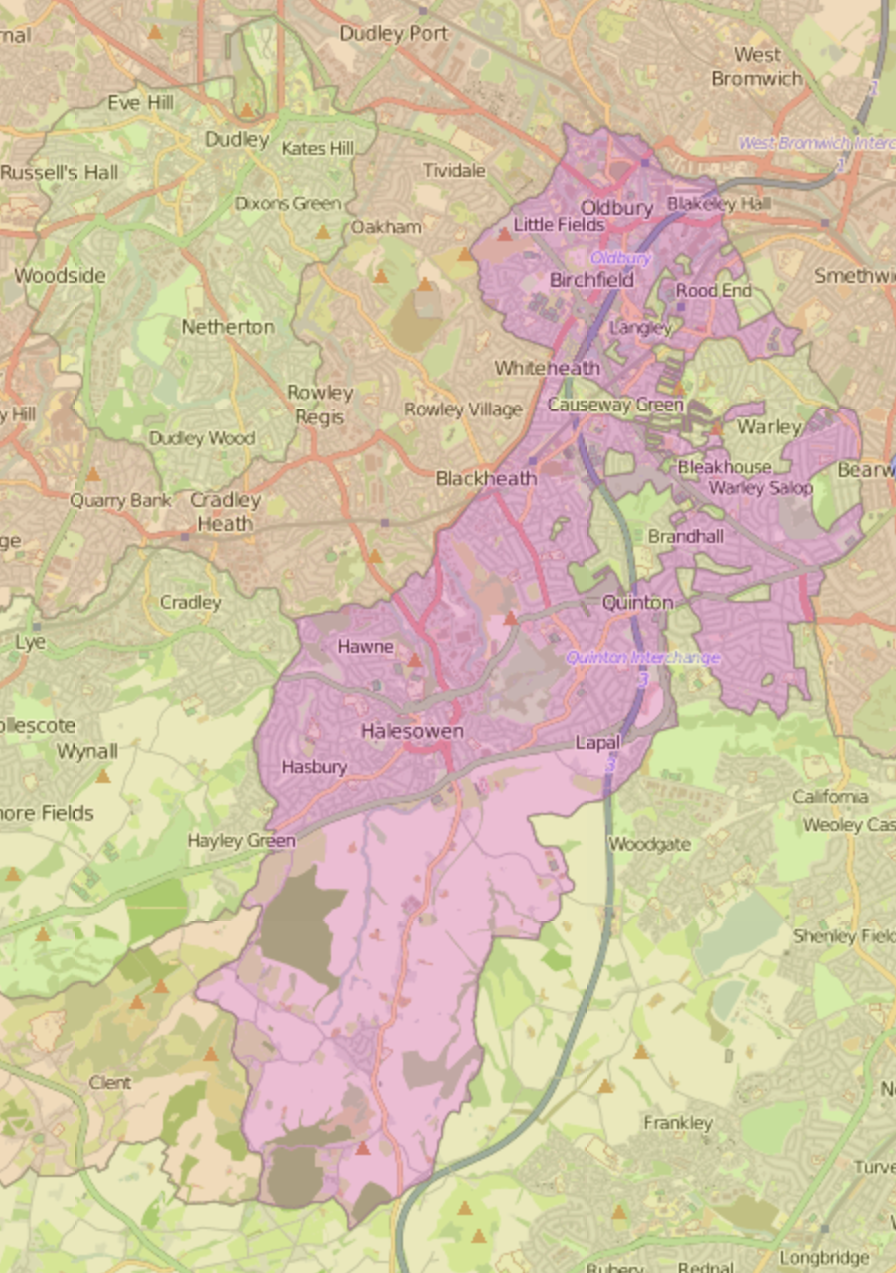
The ancient parish of Halesowen was an exclave of Shropshire, which itself contained numerous exclaves of Worcestershire at Warley Wigorn. (Historic County Borders Project)

From the 11th century; Halesowen Parish (or Hala) was gifted to the Earl of Shrewsbury, thus creating an enclave (or exclave) of Salop, lying between Worcestershire's northern border and Staffordshire's southern border. The north eastern area of the parish was divided into two fragmented parts; Warley Wigorn remained in Worcestershire, whilst the remainder became Warley Salop. Warley Wigorn was a fractured parish where its territory was divided into countless separate pieces of land, forming numerous exclaves within an exclave. Hurst Green, Langley Green, Londonderry and Rood End were among some of the larger settlements of Warley Wigorn.

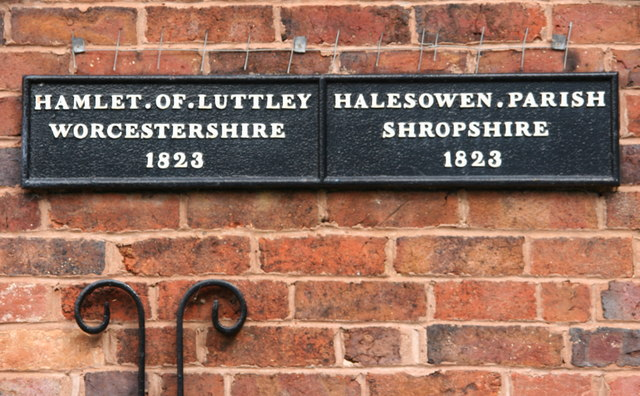
The old Worcestershire–Shropshire border – Lutley – geograph.org.uk – 961083

Cradley was also retained by Worcestershire, along with the hamlet of Lutley which was held by the "Canons of Wolverhampton". Other anomalies include the status of Bewdley, which was not formally in Worcestershire or Salop in the 15th century (despite being recorded as part of Worcestershire in the 14th Century), thus becoming a focus for criminals fleeing justice in either county. In 1544, Bewdley was formally designated part of Worcestershire.

=== Exclaves and enclaves ===
As stated earlier, Worcestershire had an unusually large number of exclaves inside nearby counties, prior to 1844 (see Fig 2). This relationship with neighbouring counties mirrored the confusing and fragmented layout of parishes within Worcestershire's own hundreds (see images and table below). Meanwhile, Herefordshire, Staffordshire, Warwickshire and Shropshire had their own exclaves within the main part of Worcestershire at Rochford, Broome, Clent, Tardebigge (Tutnall and Cobley) and Halesowen respectively. Tardebigge's history outside the county is even more colourful, changing hands from Worcestershire to Staffordshire and Warwickshire, before returning to Worcestershire at differing times over the centuries.

The exclaves and enclaves of Worcestershire

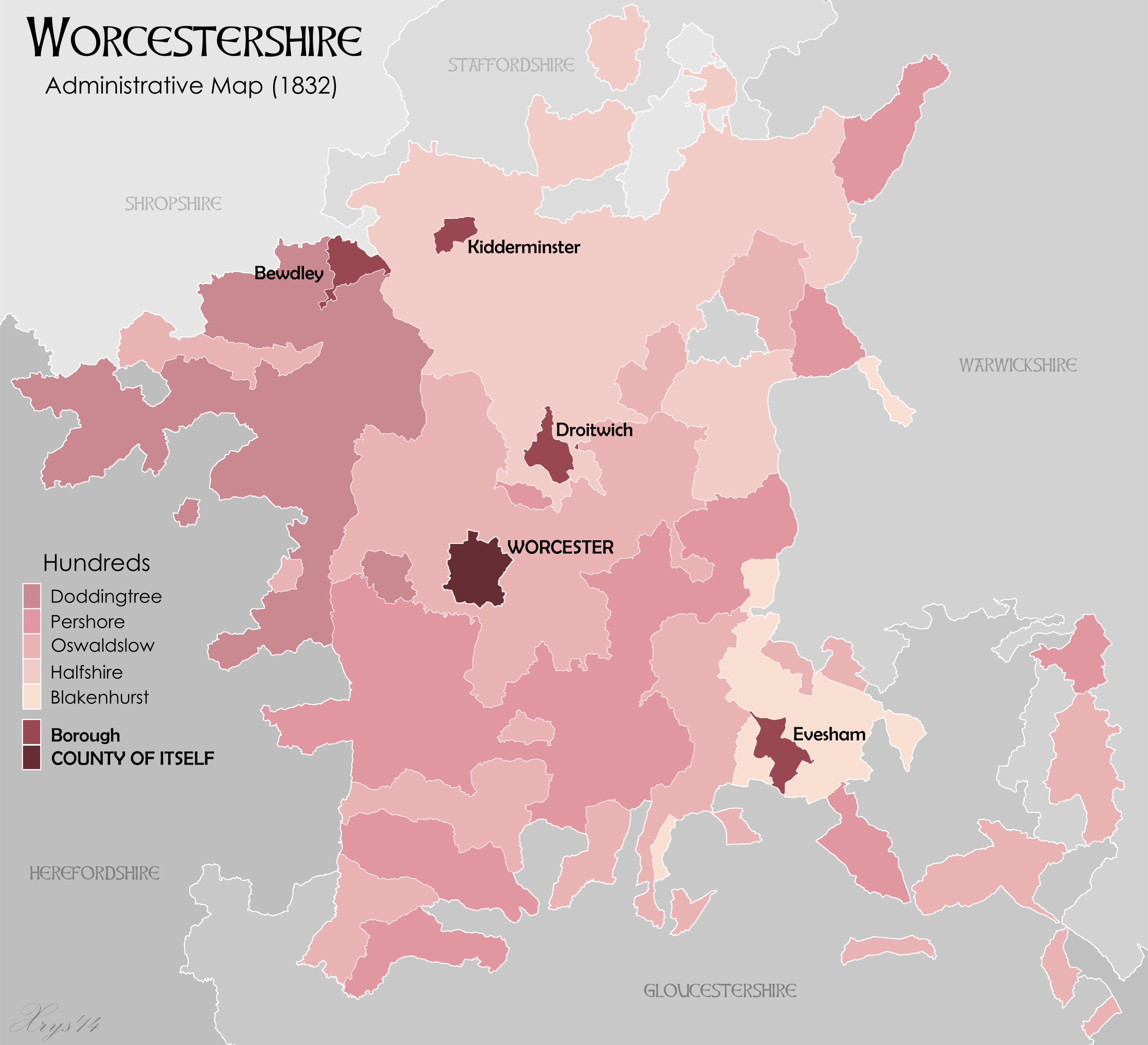
Fig 2: The County of Worcestershire (1832)

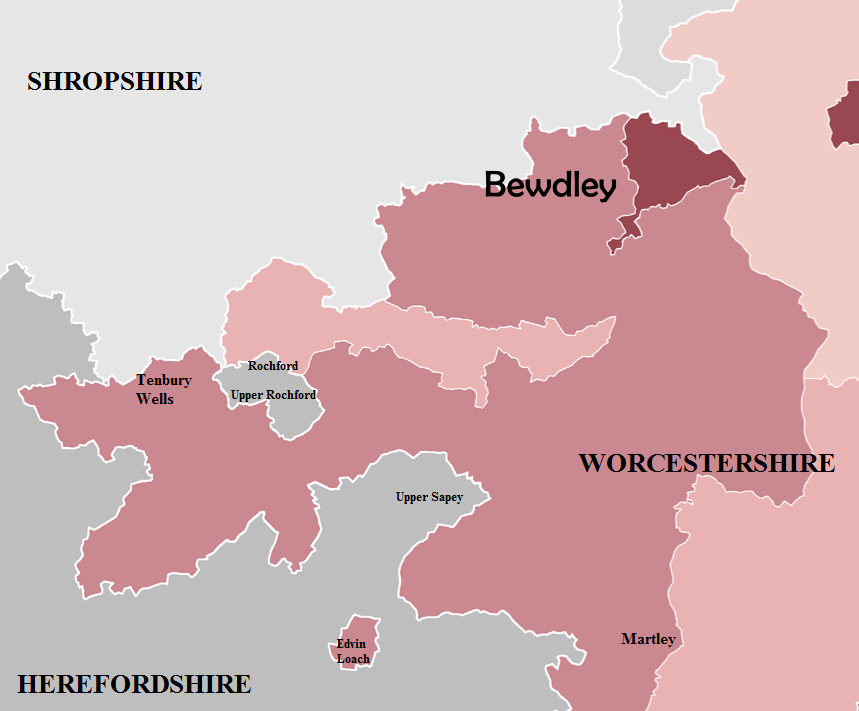
Fig 2A: North West Worcestershire

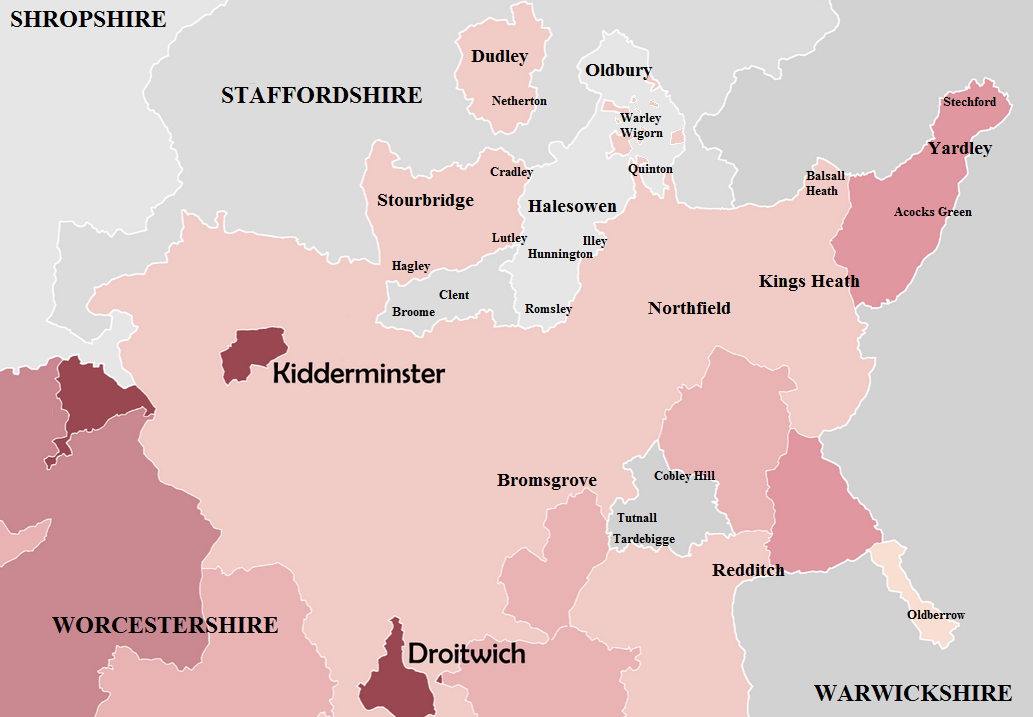
Fig 2B: North Worcestershire

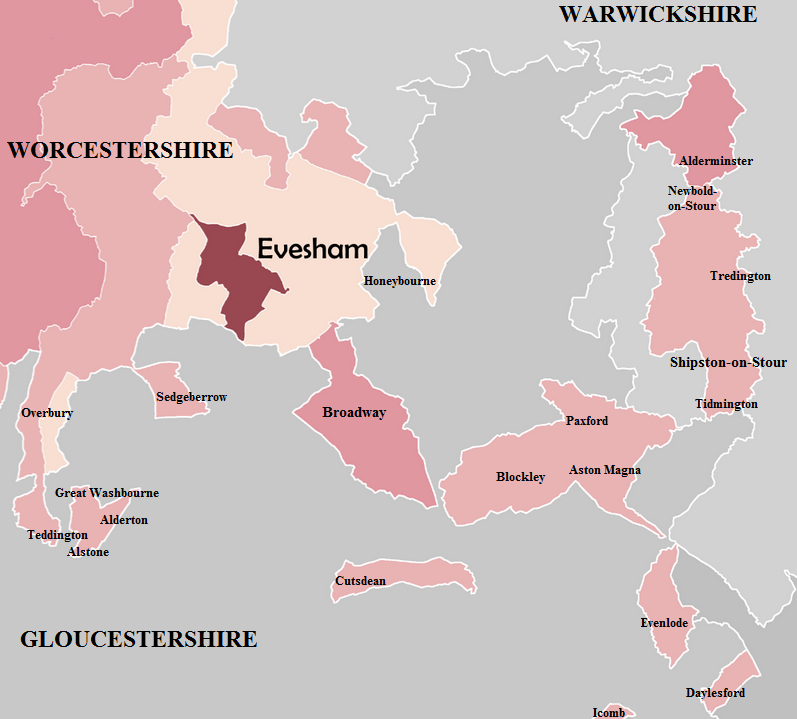
Fig 2C: South and South East Worcestershire

Fig	Exclave/enclave	County (before 1844)	Year and county of transfer	Government legislation
2C	Alderminster	Worcestershire	1931 – Warwickshire	Provisional Order Confirmation (Gloucestershire, Warwickshire and Worcestershire) Act 1931
2C	Alstone, including Alderton	Worcestershire	1844 – Gloucestershire	Counties (Detached Parts) Act 1844
2C	Blockley, including Paxford and Aston Magna	Worcestershire	1931 – Gloucestershire	Provisional Order Confirmation (Gloucestershire, Warwickshire and Worcestershire) Act 1931
2B	Broome	Staffordshire	1844 – Worcestershire	Counties (Detached Parts) Act 1844
2B	Clent	Staffordshire	1844 – Worcestershire	Counties (Detached Parts) Act 1844
2C	Cutsdean	Worcestershire	1931 – Gloucestershire	Provisional Order Confirmation (Gloucestershire, Warwickshire and Worcestershire) Act 1931
2C	Daylesford	Worcestershire	1931 – Gloucestershire	Provisional Order Confirmation (Gloucestershire, Warwickshire and Worcestershire) Act 1931
2B	Dudley, including Netherton	Worcestershire	1966 – Staffordshire	West Midlands Order 1965
2A	Edvin Loach	Worcestershire	1893 – Herefordshire	Divided Parishes and Poor Law Amendment Act 1882
2C	Evenlode	Worcestershire	1931 – Gloucestershire	Provisional Order Confirmation (Gloucestershire, Warwickshire and Worcestershire) Act 1931
2B	Halesowen, including Hunnington, Illey, Oldbury, Ridgacre, Romsley and Warley Salop†	Shropshire	1844 – Worcestershire	Counties (Detached Parts) Act 1844
2C	Icomb	Worcestershire	1844 – Gloucestershire	Counties (Detached Parts) Act 1844
2A	Rochford	Herefordshire	1844 – Worcestershire	Counties (Detached Parts) Act 1844
2C	Shipston-on-Stour	Worcestershire	1931 – Warwickshire	Provisional Order Confirmation (Gloucestershire, Warwickshire and Worcestershire) Act 1931
2B	Tardebigge (Tutnall and Cobley)	Warwickshire	1844 – Worcestershire	Counties (Detached Parts) Act 1844
2C	Tidmington	Worcestershire	1931 – Warwickshire	Provisional Order Confirmation (Gloucestershire, Warwickshire and Worcestershire) Act 1931
2C	Tredington	Worcestershire	1931 – Warwickshire	Provisional Order Confirmation (Gloucestershire, Warwickshire and Worcestershire) Act 1931
2B	Warley Wigorn†	Worcestershire	N/A	N/A

† Warley Wigorn and Warley Salop were amalgamated to form a new parish of Warley (1884–1908).

=== Evolution and revolution ===
A gradual divergence was taking place with the city and towns of the county. Worcester was largely autonomous, but the city became a county corporate in 1622, thus regarded as separate from Worcestershire. The larger towns were granted borough status from 1307 to 1660 (Bewdley, Pershore, Kidderminster, Droitwich and Evesham) and were largely confirmed as municipal boroughs from 1835 onwards, with Dudley (a manorial borough) following suit in 1865. Most of the hundreds were too cumbersome to administer and were split into 'Divisions', usually found in differing parts of the county. As the table below and Fig 2 show, some of these parishes were islands surrounded by other hundreds. A few parishes stretched over the county boundary as part of their contiguous area; Old Swinford parish included Amblecote from Staffordshire for instance. By the 19th century the Industrial Revolution started a process of economic, social and physical integration of some Worcestershire towns and villages, with neighbouring communities in Staffordshire, thus creating the urban area known as The Black Country. In 1844, following enactment of the Counties (Detached Parts) Act 1844, Halesowen and Oldbury were reunited with Worcestershire.

Elsewhere in the Halfshire hundred similar integration was taking place with the Warwickshire town of Birmingham, whom was expanding considerably to the south and east of its historic centre. The rapid urbanisation of Halfshire's northern border, along with the industrial expansion at Kidderminster and Stourbridge was in stark contrast with Oswaldslow, which was mainly rural. Worcester was still confined within its medieval boundaries, despite experiencing considerable industrial growth and population expansion. In light of these pressures; Worcester eventually incorporated the surrounding Oswaldslow parishes of the county in 1837 and 1885.

The role of local government was also changing considerably, and new single-purpose subdivisions were emerging, such as poor law unions and sanitary districts. On a county level, the administration of Worcestershire was carried out by the Courts of Quarter Sessions, who were responsible for law and order, civil jurisdiction and certain administrative functions. These roles included the licensing of alehouses, police, weights and measures, construction/maintenance of highways and bridges, poor law disputes, and setting taxes.

Name of hundred	Number of divisions	Parish / place name
Blakenhurst	2	Badsey, Bretforton, Evesham, Honeybourne, Lenchwick, North and Middle Littleton, Offenham, Oldberrow, Ombersley, South Middleton, Wickhamford
Doddingtree	2	Abberley, Astley, Alfrick, Bewdley, Dunley, Clifton-upon-Teme, Cotheridge, Martley, Suckley, Tenbury
Halfshire	2	Belbroughton, Bromsgrove, Chaddesley Corbett, Church Lench, Cofton Hackett, Cradley, Doverdale, Droitwich, Dudley, Feckenham, Frankley, Hagley, Kidderminster, Kings Norton, Netherton, Northfield, Old Swinford, Pedmore, Salwarpe, Stourbridge, Warley Wigorn
Oswaldslow	3	Alvechurch, Blackwell, Blockley, Broadwas, Claines, Cropthorne, Crowle, Elmley Castle, Evenlode, Fladbury, Hallow, Hartlebury, Harvington, Himbleton, Hindlip, Icomb, Inkberrow, Little Malvern, Overbury, Sedgeberrow, Shipston-on-Stour, St. John in Bedwardine, Stoke Prior, Tibberton, Tredington, Warndon, Welland, Wichenford
Pershore	2	Alderminster, Broadway, Castlemorton, Eckington, Flyford Flavell, Hanley Castle, Leigh, Martin Hussingtree, Newland, Peopleton, Pershore, Pinvin, Powick. Severn Stoke, Strensham, Upton Snodsbury, Wyre Piddle, Yardley

The main township part of St. John in Bedwardine parish was incorporated into the City of Worcester in 1837.

== Counties (Detached Parts) Act 1844 ==
The Counties (Detached Parts) Act 1844 was an act of Parliament which abolished many of the exclaves of counties in England and Wales. The precursor to this legislation was the Reform Act 1832 and Parliamentary Boundaries Act 1832, which redefined the boundaries for members of parliament. These acts changed the status of many exclaves and enclaves, starting the process of incorporating these 'outliers' into their surrounding county. This act of Parliament was designed to eradicate the issue of "islands" or "exclaves", but numerous exclaves remained part of Worcestershire until the enactment of the Provisional Order Confirmation (Gloucestershire, Warwickshire and Worcestershire) Act 1931. Dudley was Worcestershire's final exclave; it was transferred to Staffordshire in 1966 by the West Midlands Order 1965 (SI 1965/2139).

=== Civil parishes ===
Historically; the division into ancient parishes was linked to the manorial system, with parishes and manors often sharing the same boundaries. However the Poor Law Amendment Act 1866 declared a divergence between the historic ecclesiastical parish and administrative functions within the locality, thus creating civil parishes. These administrative units formed the bottom-tier of local government within England and were established from 1866.

=== Political Reform ===
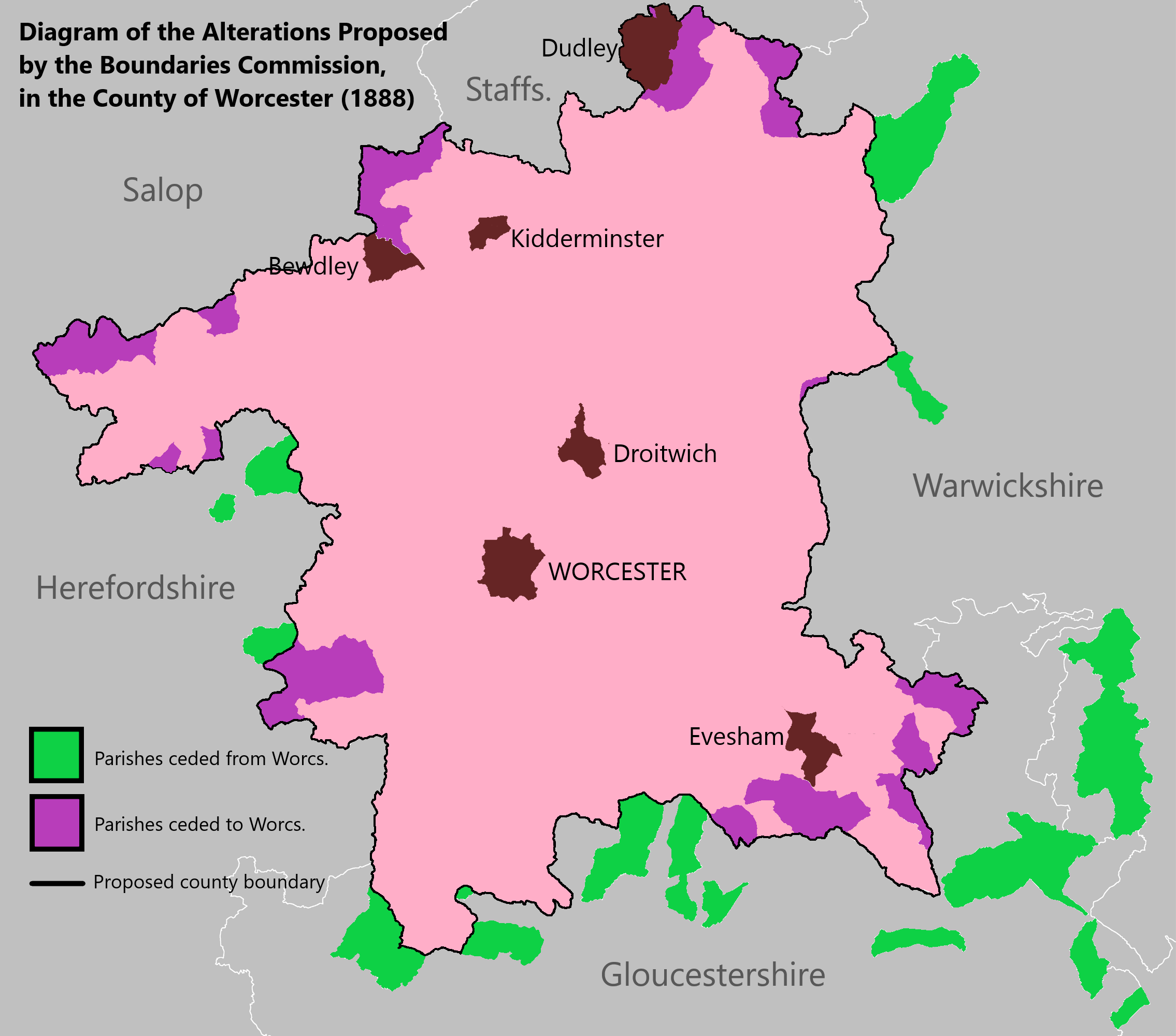
Fig 3. Map depicting the repealed 1888 boundary proposals

By the 1880s there was increasing pressure to reform the structure of English counties and the question of county government had become a major political issue. Both the Liberal and Conservative party manifestos for the 1886 general election contained promises to introduce elected local authorities. The Local Government (Boundaries) Act 1887 received royal assent in September 1887 and appointed Boundary Commissioners to review the existing county boundaries, except for the 'counties corporate'. Fig 3 showed that Worcestershire would have witnessed the formation of a county administration and a loss of Yardley, Shipston-on-Stour and Tredington to Warwickshire. The act also legislated for Dudley to reunite with the rest of the county, through a transfer of Rowley Regis and Cradley Heath from Staffordshire. The proposals would have also seen Smethwick join Worcestershire, plus Burford (uniting all of Tenbury rural sanitary district into one county), Ipsley, Upper Arley, Pebworth and West Malvern. The proposed border with Gloucestershire, Warwickshire and Herefordshire would have seen considerable exchanges of parishes, thus eliminating all of Worcestershire's exclaves/enclaves. This act was repealed in favour of the alternative Local Government Act 1888. The repealed act's proposals were drastic and would have altered the county considerably, however subsequent legislation implemented many of these proposals, but on a gradual basis.

== 1888–1958 ==
=== Local Government Act 1888 ===
The Local Government Act 1888 created the administrative counties of England and their respective county councils, and came into effect on 1 April 1889. The administrative county of Worcestershire was governed by Worcestershire County Council, in a new structure that replaced or 'superseded' many of the administrative functions carried out by the quarter sessions of Worcestershire. The administrative county covered the historic shire of Worcestershire, except for two newly designated county boroughs at Dudley and Worcester (The City and County of Worcester). A county borough was a single-tier authority, regarded within the Local Government Act 1888 as independent of county council jurisdiction or an "administrative county of itself". This was due to the size of the general population or historic status as 'Counties Corporate'. The Act also ensured that Worcestershire's boundaries for what was classified as "non-administrative purposes" would match that of the administrative county (including the county boroughs in most cases). The non-administrative purposes were stated to be "sheriff, lieutenant (custos rotulorum), justices, militia, coroner, or other", thus resembling the functions of modern ceremonial counties.

=== Local Government Act 1894 ===
The hundreds were replaced by a new district council formation of either urban or rural districts following implementation of the Local Government Act 1894. These new 'districts' were 'second-tier' administrative units under county council jurisdiction, but did not form part of a county borough which were 'single tier' authorities. The Act did not legislate the abolition of the hundreds, but their remaining powers were given to the new district councils. The district council boundaries were also self-contained in one administrative county as per the legislation and therefore, unlike some of their predecessors, did not stray over the external shire boundaries. For example, the former Poor Law Union of Alcester in Warwickshire included Abbots Morton, Feckenham, Inkberrow and Oldberrow within its area until the 1894 changes. The Act also introduced structural changes to civil parishes, abolishing vestries and established elected civil parish councils in all rural parishes with more than 300 electors. These were grouped into their rural districts. Boundaries were altered to avoid parishes being split between counties.

=== Birmingham, Oldberrow, Upper Arley and Edvin Loach (1891–1911) ===
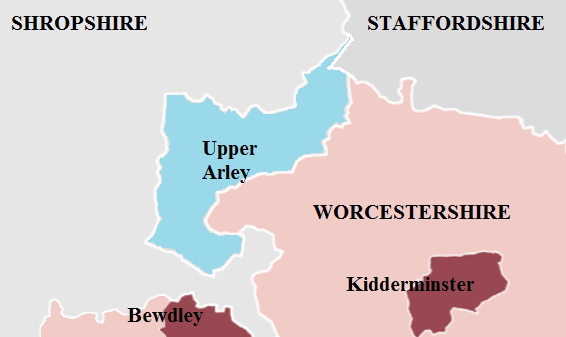
Fig 4: Map of the Upper Arley boundary change in 1895. The parish was transferred from Staffordshire to Worcestershire

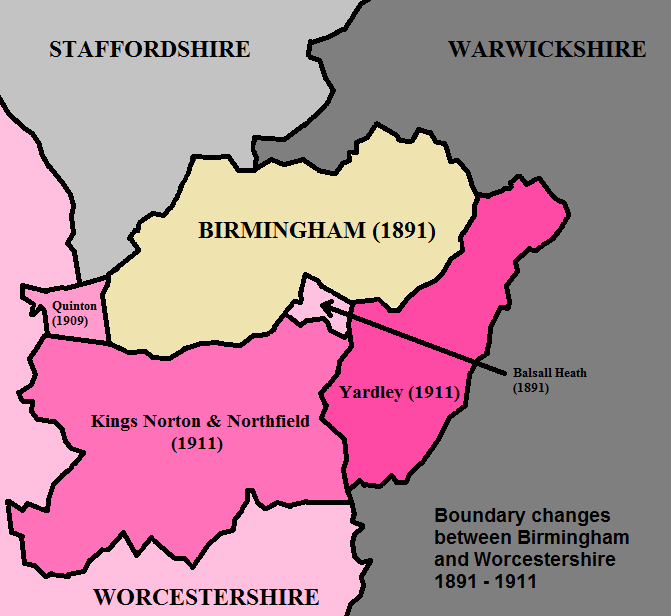
Fig 5: Map showing the transfer of Balsall Heath, Quinton, Yardley and Kings Norton & Northfield from Worcestershire to Birmingham, Warwickshire (1891–1911) Map excludes similar Warwickshire and Staffordshire boundary changes.

Within a short time after the 1888 act, Worcestershire's northern external boundaries began to alter (See Fig 5). The district of Balsall Heath, which had originally constituted the most northerly part of the Parish of King's Norton, was the first area of the county to be added to the newly designated City of Birmingham on 1 October 1891. This was followed by the small island of Edvin Loach near Bromyard, which was transferred to Herefordshire in 1893. Two years following the loss of Edvin Loach, the county gained the parish of Upper Arley, which was a Staffordshire parish nearly surrounded by Worcestershire and Shropshire (See Fig 4). Oldberrow parish, which was situated in the north east Worcestershire border area was transferred to Warwickshire County Council jurisdiction during 1896. Stoke Bliss was always regarded as part of Herefordshire until 1897, when it was transferred to Worcestershire. As a consequence; Acton Beauchamp was transferred to Herefordshire.

The continuous expansion of Birmingham city has been a large contributory factor to Worcestershire's fluid boundary changes and associated housing issues. Balsall Heath was followed into Birmingham by Quinton Urban District in November 1909, and then by both the Rural District of Yardley and the greater part of the Urban District of King's Norton and Northfield. These latter transfers into the city were as part of the Greater Birmingham Scheme 1911 on 9 November 1911, which saw a considerable expansion of the city into its surrounding districts. As a consequence of the transfer to Birmingham; these areas (and Balsall Heath) were regarded as part of Warwickshire.

=== Expansion of Dudley and Smethwick (1926–1928) ===
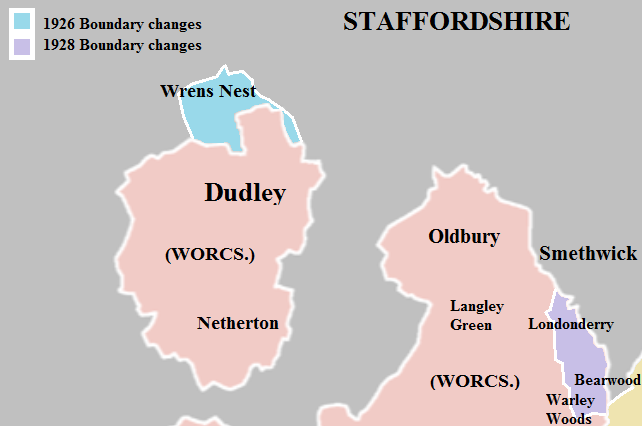
Fig 6: Map signifying the two boundary changes between Staffordshire and Worcestershire in 1926 and 1928 affecting Dudley County Borough and Oldbury Urban District

The compact size of Dudley County Borough combined with an increasing population, the high cost of reclaiming derelict land and urgent slum clearance contributed to a dire housing and land shortage. This resulted in the council "acquiring land from adjacent local authorities". At the expense of Staffordshire, Worcestershire grew slightly in 1926 to allow for the construction of the Priory Estate on land which was mostly situated in Sedgley. These boundary changes also saw the purchase of the town's castle and priory ruins by the council, primarily to free up surrounding land for social housing. Several thousand homes (mostly council owned) were built between 1929 and 1955 on what became known as the Priory, Wren's Nest and Old Park Farm estates.

A similar housing and land shortage existed in nearby Smethwick County Borough, which also resulted in the local authority acquiring land from adjoining council areas. By 1914; the urban area of Bearwood had already spread over the border of Oldbury Urban District as far as Rathbone Road and Warley Park. Smethwick put forward a proposal in 1920 for the extension of its boundary to include all of Oldbury. However the county boundary was adjusted partially in 1928 and on this occasion however, Staffordshire gained territory from Worcestershire at Warley Woods (See Fig 6). This enabled Smethwick to build new housing estates at Londonderry and to the west of Rathbone Road.

The housing and land shortage within Smethwick continued after World War II, rendering the council to concentrate primarily on constructing medium-rise maisonettes, flats and high-rise tower blocks for social housing needs. In 1948; Smethwick and West Bromwich County Borough planned to amalgamate, however a merger did not take place until 1974.

=== Provisional Order Confirmation (Gloucestershire, Warwickshire and Worcestershire) Act 1931 ===
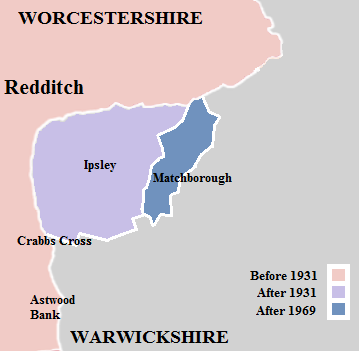
Fig 7: Map signifying the Worcestershire county boundary changes affecting the Redditch area, before and after the "New Town" designation in 1964

The Counties (Detached Parts) Act 1844 was originally designed to eradicate exclaves or 'islands' and amalgamate the area with the surrounding county; Worcestershire however, still possessed many 'outliers' to the south east. This was before enactment of the Provisional Order Confirmation (Gloucestershire, Warwickshire and Worcestershire) Act 1931 which nearly completed the task of amalgamating Worcestershire's islands into their surrounding county, except for Dudley. The then-Parliamentary Secretary to the Attorney-General - William Morrison MP (Cirencester and Tewkesbury) said in the subsequent parliamentary debate, that the Local Government Act 1929 centralised the service of Poor Law and health upon the county councils concerned, thus making it difficult for the 'outlying' rural districts to obtain certain services from their neighbouring county. This act transferred Blockley, Daylesford and Evenlode to Gloucestershire, while Warwickshire gained Alderminster, Tidmington and Tredington. The whole of Shipston-on-Stour Rural District was also merged into Warwickshire and subsequently amalgamated with Brailes Rural District.

The outliers were not the only boundary realignments as part of the Act. The south western tip of Worcestershire at Redmarley D'Abitot and Staunton was transferred to Gloucestershire, while the county gained the parish of Ipsley from Alcester Rural District in Warwickshire (See Fig 7), which was added to the expanding Redditch Urban District.

=== Local Government Boundary Commission (1945–1949) ===
The Local Government Boundary Commission proposed radical changes to the local government structures during 1948. The plans included merging Worcestershire with Herefordshire to form a new administrative unit, except Dudley and Oldbury which would become part of a new "Stafford South" county. Worcester and Dudley would remain as county boroughs, however some services would be carried out by the respective county council. While the commission's proposals were abandoned, revised proposals for a combined Herefordshire & South Worcestershire county were to surface twenty years later.

== Local Government Act 1958 ==
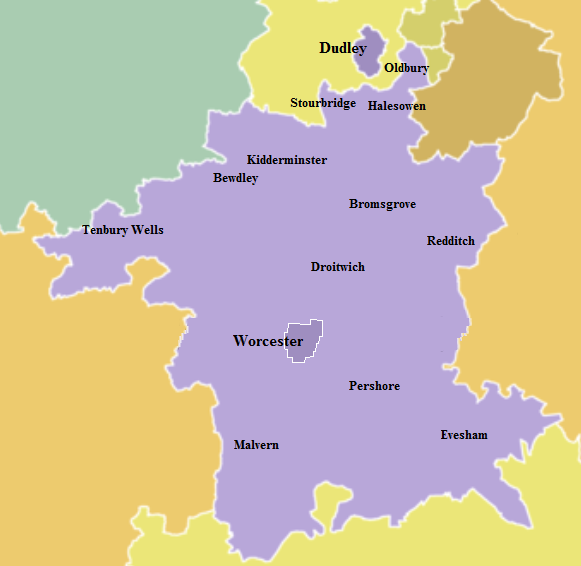
Map of Worcestershire (including the two county boroughs) – Prior to enactment of the "West Midlands Order 1965"

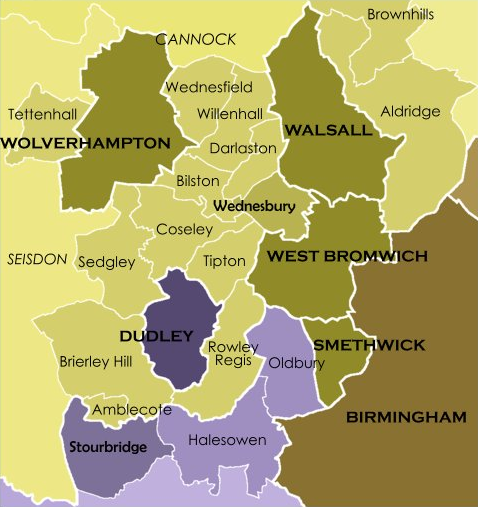
Fig 8: The local government structure within North Worcestershire and South Staffordshire – Prior to the West Midlands Order 1965 reorganisation

Over the course of the 19th and 20th centuries; Birmingham and the Black Country were coalescing into a single extensive conurbation, spanning across Warwickshire, Staffordshire and Worcestershire. This expansion saw further economic and physical integration with neighbouring towns and communities. This process became more prominent due to growing housing issues, extensive bombing during World War II, slum clearance, and continuing migration into urban areas. The Black Country contained a combination of county boroughs, urban districts, municipal boroughs and county councils (See Fig 8) taking responsibility for services, which resulted in a fragmented local government infrastructure. The Local Government Act 1958 appointed a Local Government Commission to review administrative structures and boundaries in England outside London. The act designated a West Midlands Special Review Area, whose recommendations would ultimately form the West Midlands Order 1965 legislation. A second report known as the West Midlands General Review looked into the administrative authorities within the wider region, including the remainder of Worcestershire.

=== West Midlands Special Review Area ===
The commission made its report in July 1961. It recommended that the Black Country area should be administered by large county boroughs, and that the remaining urban districts or municipal boroughs be merged into these authorities. The original county council's responsibilities for services within the majority of the conurbation were curtailed and association with the historic shire was for ceremonial purposes only. The West Midlands Special Review Area included Dudley, Oldbury, Stourbridge and Halesowen (as per Fig. 8). The latter two council areas were not incorporated into a county borough, as part of the eventual West Midlands Order 1965. Halesowen was proposed to be included within an enlarged Smethwick County Borough, but a successful campaign entitled "Hands off Halesowen" orchestrated by a non-partisan group called the "Halesowen Independence Committee" helped stop the plans.

Meanwhile, the second report into the West Midland General Review area was also delivered in July 1961 and a proposal for Worcester to lose its county borough status was not implemented.

=== West Midlands Order 1965 ===
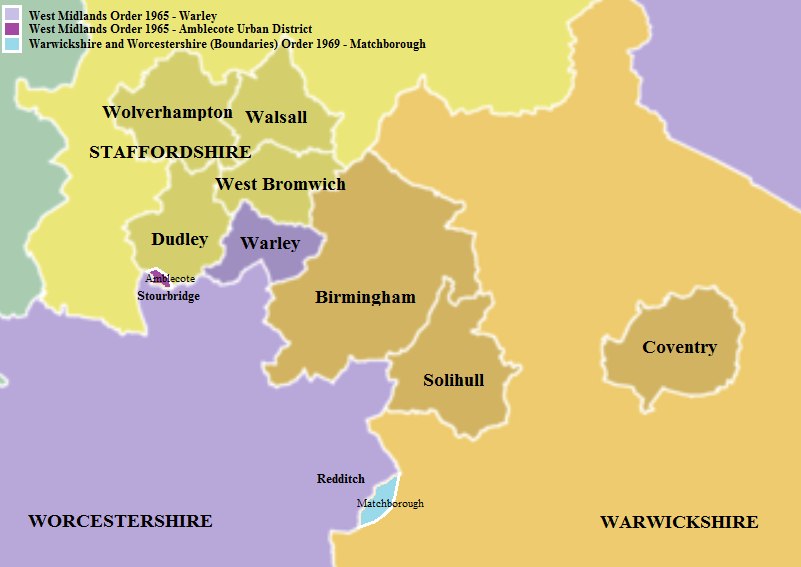
Fig 9: The boundaries of South Staffordshire, West Warwickshire and North Worcestershire after the local government reorganisations of the 1960s.

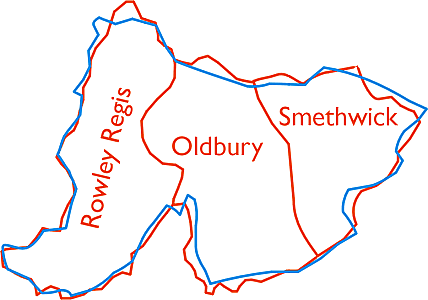
The County Borough of Warley – Warley's boundaries are shown as blue. The former Oldbury Urban District, Rowley Regis Urban District and Smethwick County Borough boundaries are marked red

In April 1966, Dudley expanded beyond its historical boundaries and took in the surrounding Staffordshire districts of Sedgley, Brierley Hill, Coseley and part of Amblecote. The West Midlands Order 1965 (SI 1965/2139) redefined its status and the Dudley County Borough became part of Staffordshire. Worcestershire County Council retained Halesowen and Stourbridge, but ceded Oldbury to an enlarged Smethwick County Borough which was renamed Warley County Borough. This enlarged county borough would be regarded as part of Worcestershire for "non-administrative purposes", but not under county council jurisdiction (see Fig 9). Warley was an amalgamation of Oldbury Urban District, Rowley Regis Urban District, and Smethwick as well as the Oakham area of Dudley and Tividale area of Tipton. Subsequent associated legislation established the West Midlands Constabulary, which policed the county borough area, and the West Midlands Passenger Transport Executive.

=== Amblecote and Redditch New Town ===
During these reorganisations, the territory of the county council grew only where Stourbridge took in the majority of Amblecote Urban District from Staffordshire (See Fig 9) and the designation of Redditch in April 1964 as a "new town". Historically, Redditch lay on the county boundary, so any expansion of the newly designated town would either fall under the Green Belt to the north, or the surrounding area of Warwickshire at Matchborough. Therefore, the boundary between the two counties was realigned in favour of Worcestershire, as a consequence of the Warwickshire and Worcestershire (Boundaries) Order 1969 legislation (Fig 7). The Redditch New Town designation coincided with a programme of considerable social housing development, mainly due to enactment of the Town Development Act 1952. Numerous housing developments took place across the county, especially in Droitwich, Worcester and along the Birmingham boundary at Frankley, Hawkesley, Kitwell, Rednal, Rubery and Walkers Heath. The majority of these developments were designed to help alleviate the housing and land shortages within Birmingham's boundaries.

Highters Heath, lying to the north of Wythall, was transferred to Birmingham in 1966, along with a few residential areas around Maypole.

=== Redcliffe-Maud Report (1966–1969) ===
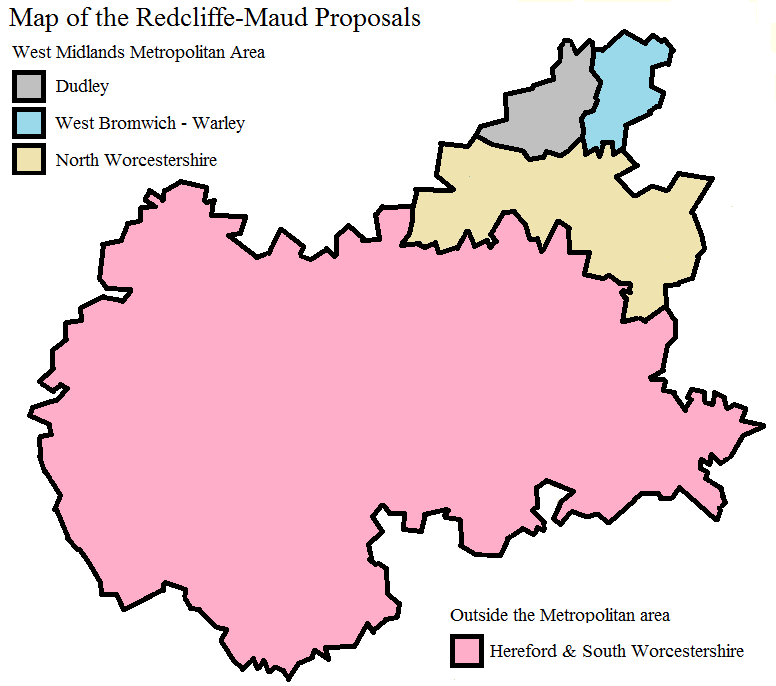
Fig 10: Redcliffe-Maud map – featuring the proposals for Worcestershire and the surrounding areas of Herefordshire and South Staffordshire

Under the Labour Government of 1964 to 1970; the Redcliffe-Maud Report (Cmnd. 4040) recommended the abolition of all existing county, county borough, borough, urban district and rural district councils and replacement with new authorities. These new unitary (i.e. single tier) authorities were largely based on major towns, which acted as regional employment, commercial, social and recreational centres and took into account local transport infrastructure and travel patterns.

The proposals for the county included a considerable loss of territory to a proposed "West Midlands Metropolitan Area", as per Fig 10. Stourbridge was including in the planned Metropolitan District of Dudley, while West Bromwich-Warley proposed to include Halesowen, and a district known as North Worcestershire planned to incorporate Bewdley, Bromsgrove, Kidderminster, Redditch and Stourport-on-Severn. The remaining part of central and southern Worcestershire (including Worcester), would be amalgamated with Herefordshire to form a new administrative unit. All of these areas would exist under an overarching "West Midlands Provincial Council" covering the entire region in a devolved capacity. The Conservative party won the 1970 general election and committed to a two-tier system in local government. In 1971 a further White Paper entitled Local Government in England: Government Proposals for Reorganisation (Cmnd 4584), which ultimately led to the Local Government Act 1972 and the 1974 re-organisation which saw a great deal of Redcliffe-Maud's recommendations discontinued.

== Halesowen, Stourbridge and Malvernshire (1971–1974) ==
The Local Government in England: Government Proposals for Reorganisation (Cmnd 4584) 1971 White Paper and bill, which ultimately became the Local Government Act 1972, did not go as far as the Redcliffe–Maud Report. Plans for the amalgamation of Herefordshire, Worcester and the majority of Worcestershire remained, except for Halesowen, Stourbridge and Warley. These three areas would join a proposed metropolitan county along with Dudley. The West Midlands Order 1965 and associated legislation (i.e. the formation of the West Midlands Constabulary) instigated a large degree of local government integration within the West Midlands conurbation, however this was carried out under a county borough system in place since 1889.

Stourbridge would be incorporated into an enlarged Dudley administrative unit, plus Halesowen would join Warley and West Bromwich. During the debates associated with the Local Government Bill, Terry Davis MP (Bromsgrove) tabled amendment numbers 73, 74 and 100 which proposed maintaining Worcestershire and Herefordshire as separate counties. He also stated that the bill "is not welcomed in Halesowen or Stourbridge or the county as a whole" and "The situation has therefore been reluctantly accepted in Worcestershire, and this group of amendments would not change this part of the Bill." He said that while agreement was in place for Worcester to be "included in the County of Worcestershire", the merger with Herefordshire was "intensely unpopular", especially from within the neighbouring county. Dr. John Gilbert MP (Dudley) said in the amendment debate regarding the future of Seisdon Rural District that while Dudley has:

"no imperialist ambitions. ... We have no wish to engorge Stourbridge or Halesowen. Although the merger is going through smoothly, as a result of the exercise of tact and co-operation on the part of all the local authorities and between and within all the political parties ...".

These amendments were defeated in the subsequent vote paving the way for the future "Hereford and Worcester", as were with amendment numbers 294 and 295 which would have consented to the transfer of Kinver Parish from Seisdon in Staffordshire to the new combined Herefordshire and Worcestershire authority. In the accompanying debates in the House of Lords, Worcestershire Peer Lord Sandys said that Stourbridge and Halesowen's respective borough councils, "duly elected, are wholly opposed to being joined to the conurbation". He continued by stating that "a reason for the support of the county council, which is wholeheartedly for the boroughs of Halesowen and Stourbridge in their opposition to joining the conurbation, is the question of the Green Belt." which could become threatened by future development.

Originally the combined authority was to be called Malvernshire and this term was used in the early Local Government Bill debates and statistics. By the time the bill became law, the new administrative unit became Hereford and Worcester.

The Local Government Act 1972 legislated for the functions of local government within Worcestershire to be transferred to the new administrative counties of 'Hereford and Worcester' or 'West Midlands'. However; The act (and subsequent local government legislation) did not legislate the abolition of the historic county of Worcestershire, but only the transfer of its functions to the successor bodies.

=== County of West Midlands ===
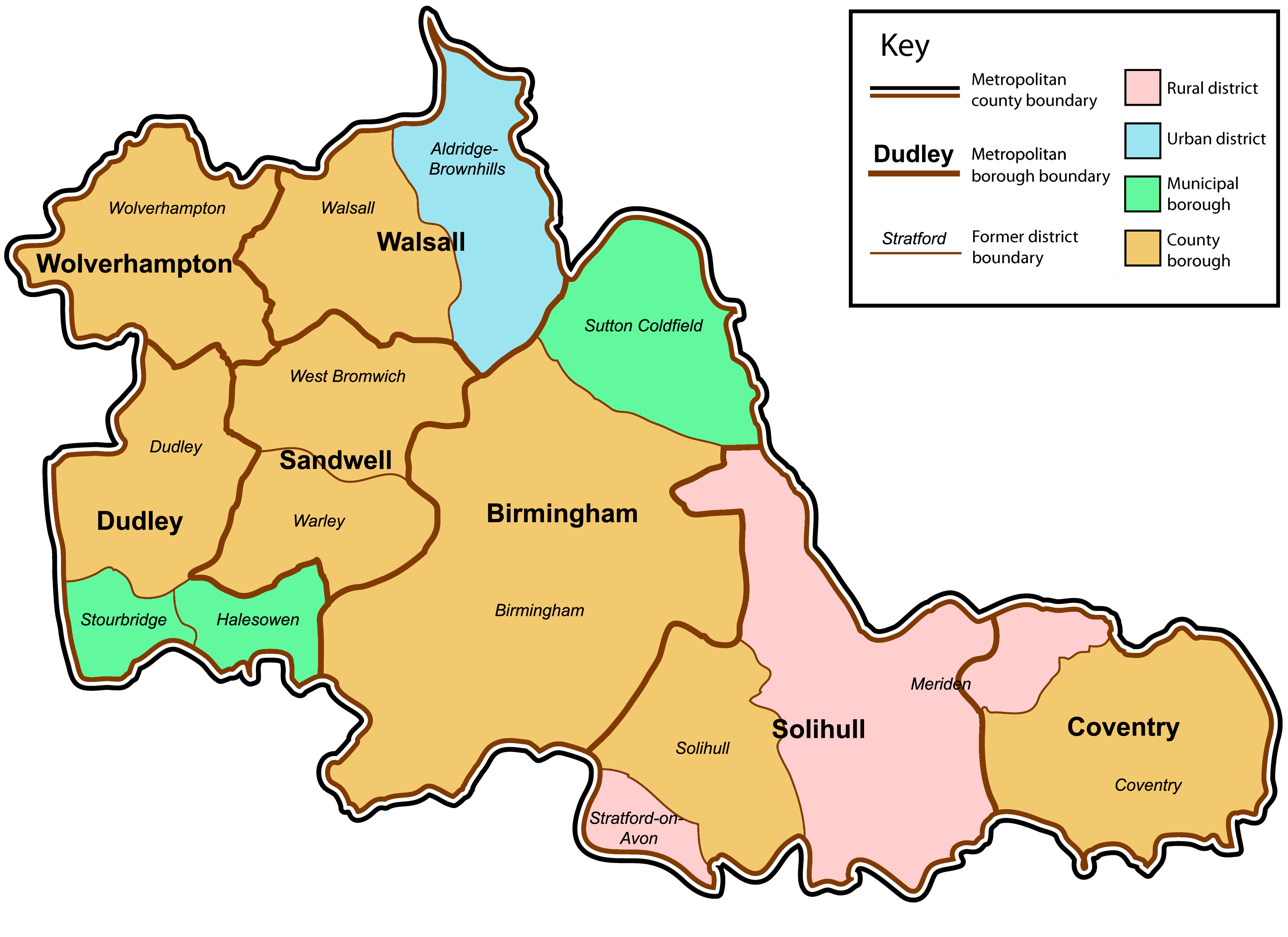
Fig 11: West Midlands County map – featuring the incorporation of Dudley County Borough, Halesowen Municipal Borough, Stourbridge Municipal Borough and Warley County Borough

The West Midlands Special Review and subsequent West Midlands Order 1965 legislation could be defined as the first real attempt by government at creating a unified Black Country for administrative purposes, albeit under the county borough system. Fig 9 - demonstrates that a Proto - West Midlands County appeared to be in existence eight years before the metropolitan county was formally established, if Birmingham and Solihull were also factored in. Although not all areas of the West Midlands conurbation were incorporated into a county borough. The Local Government Act 1972 legislated for a new metropolitan administrative unit to be known as the County of West Midlands, incorporating the North West Warwickshire, South Staffordshire and North Worcestershire border area. The Act also legislated that the new county would be sub-divided into metropolitan districts, although most districts became metropolitan boroughs after being granted or regranted royal charters giving them borough status. The West Midlands was to be largely centred on the Birmingham and Black Country county boroughs, but with a boundary roughly matching the West Midlands conurbation, as per Fig 11. However the Meriden Gap in Warwickshire was included, enabling Coventry to be incorporated into the new structure. Within this new authority; Dudley County Borough along with Stourbridge and Halesowen formed Dudley Metropolitan District (later to become Dudley Metropolitan Borough), while Warley County Borough merged with West Bromwich to create Sandwell. Most of the rural hinterland proposed by Redcliffe-Maud was discarded; thus permitting Bewdley, Bromsgrove, Kidderminster, Redditch and Stourport-on-Severn to become part of the new Hereford and Worcester authority. On 1 April 1974; (the day of local government reorganisation) an article in The Times quoted an unnamed 'Department of the Environment' official who said:

"The new county boundaries are solely for the purpose of defining areas of first-level government of the future: They are administrative areas and will not alter the traditional boundaries of counties, nor is it intended that the loyalties of people living in them will change"

The Ministry of Housing, Communities and Local Government's guidance entitled 'Celebrating the historic counties of England' stated:

"The Act did not specifically abolish historic counties, but they no longer exist for the purposes of the administration of local government, although some historic county areas may be coterminous with non-metropolitan county areas established by the 1972 Act."

Despite the vague reassurances from government, the new authority was not popular. John Butcher MP (Coventry South West) said in Parliament during 1982:

"The West Midlands Metropolitan County Council is as useful to local government as the appendix is to the digestive system. Its presence is unnecessary and it becomes noticeable only when it malfunctions."

The West Midlands County Council existed for only a short period before abolition in April 1986 via enactment of the Local Government Act 1985, which abolished the metropolitan county councils and Greater London Council. The individual metropolitan boroughs resumed most services which were provided at county level or through joint bodies such as the West Midlands Passenger Transport Authority. Black Country historian and author Tom Harkin said in a 2021 Express & Star article:

"It was a total disaster, and very costly to taxpayers and ratepayers. It replaced a system of local government which had served the people well for years, just because that is what people in London wanted."

== Hereford and Worcester (1974–1998) ==
The Local Government Act 1972 came into force on 1 April 1974, which saw most of the county amalgamated with Herefordshire and Worcester City to form a single non-metropolitan county of "Hereford and Worcester".

Fig 12: The new county was divided into nine districts:

Map	No	District	Composition
	1	Wyre Forest	Worcestershire: Bewdley, Kidderminster, Stourport, Kidderminster RD
	2	Bromsgrove	Worcestershire: Bromsgrove, Bromsgrove RD
	3	Redditch	Worcestershire: Redditch
	4	Wychavon	Worcestershire: Droitwich, Evesham, Evesham RD, most of Droitwich RD, most of Pershore RD
	5	Worcester	Worcestershire: County Borough of Worcester, Warndon from Droitwich RD, St Peter the Great County from Pershore RD
	6	Malvern Hills	Worcestershire: Malvern, Martley RD, Upton RD Herefordshire: Bromyard RD, Ledbury RD
	7	Leominster	Worcestershire: Tenbury RD Herefordshire: Kington, Leominster, Kington RD, Leominster and Wigmore RD, Weobley RD
	8	Hereford	Herefordshire: Hereford
	9	South Herefordshire	Herefordshire: Ross-on-Wye, Bore and Bredwardine RD, Hereford RD, Ross and Whitchurch RD

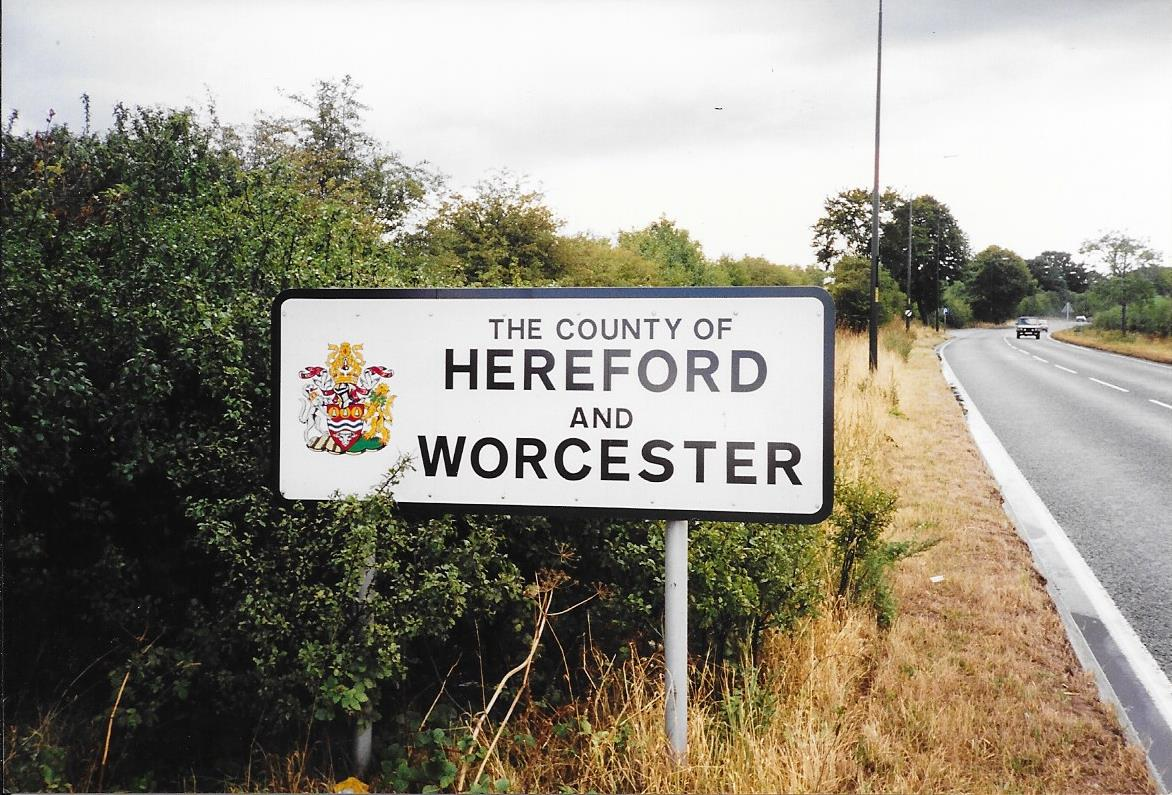
Hereford & Worcester boundary sign on the A449 road.

Meanwhile, the Local Government Boundary Commission for England started its periodic structural reviews and looked at all administrative areas on an individual basis. Leominster District Council proposed a boundary change at Burford, near Tenbury Wells to incorporate the area into Hereford & Worcester from Shropshire during 1987/1988. This proposal was rejected by the LGBCE as well as a minor adjustment at Upper Arley. The commission also investigated splitting Hereford & Worcester in 1990, following submissions by Hereford City Council and the "Herefordshire Action Committee", although the proposals were rejected at that time. Boundary changes between Hereford & Worcester and Warwickshire at Mappleborough Green, Pebworth, Long Marston and Studley were also proposed, and some were accepted resulting in minor changes to both counties. In 1993 there were more minor adjustments of the county boundary, this time between Bromsgrove and Dudley Metropolitan Borough near to Wollescote and Solihull Metropolitan Borough near Hockley Heath.

=== Review of the West Midlands (City of Birmingham) Boundaries with Bromsgrove (Hereford and Worcester) ===
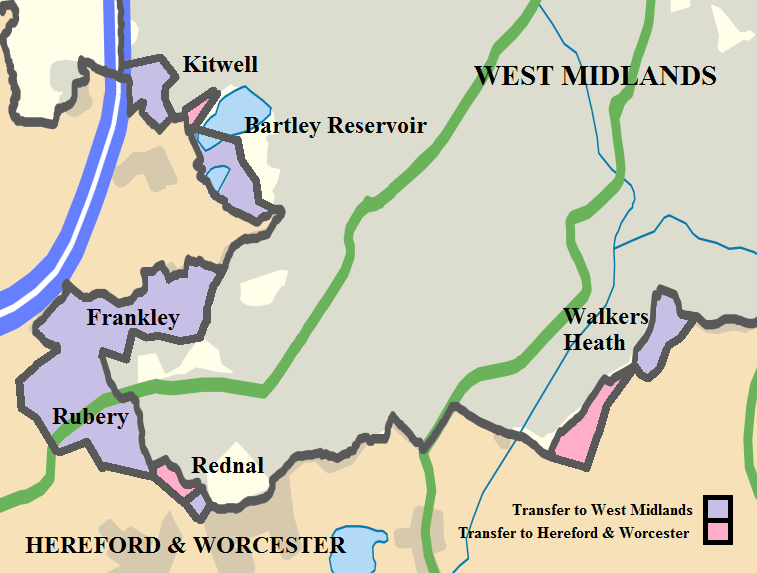
Fig 13: "Review of the West Midlands (City of Birmingham) Boundaries with Bromsgrove (Hereford & Worcester)" (Report No. 629) 9 January 1992 – Map showing the proposals transferring territory between Hereford & Worcester and the West Midlands.

The last territory exchange between the West Midlands County and Hereford & Worcester or its successor administrative authority occurred along sections of the Birmingham and Bromsgrove district boundary. The draft proposals and final report of the LBGCE Review of the West Midlands (City of Birmingham) Boundaries with Bromsgrove (Hereford & Worcester) proposed Frankley, Kitwell, Rubery, Walkers Heath and the remainder of Rednal and Bartley Reservoir transfer to Birmingham, as per Fig 13. The rationale for the proposals were the unification of several housing estates built and maintained by Birmingham City Council, under the Town Development Act 1952, which fell within the Bromsgrove boundary. These were referred to as the "North Worcester developments". Frankley was split into two parts with New Frankley and the area around Bartley Reservoir transferred from Bromsgrove to Birmingham in April 1995. The small village of Frankley remained in Hereford and Worcester and formed a new civil parish under the same name. Hopwood's surrounding areas were transferred from the city to Bromsgrove. Rubery remained within Hereford and Worcester (and the successor Worcestershire authority), contrary to the LGBCE final proposal.

These boundary changes were relatively minor in comparison to previous transfers.

==== Solihull Ratepayers' Association Proposals ====
Local Government Boundary Commission Report no. 682 "Review of the Metropolitan Counties - The West Midlands Borough of Solihull: Boundaries with the City of Birmingham and with the Counties of Warwickshire and Hereford & Worcester" noted proposals advocated by the "Solihull Ratepayers' Association". These proposals included a transfer of Wythall, Hollywood and Drakes Cross to Solihull, along with adjoining Earlswood and Tanworth-in-Arden from Warwickshire. These proposals were rejected by the commission.

=== Local Government Act 1992 ===
Following the Local Government Act 1992 legislation; the LGBCE was once again charged with examining all English non-metropolitan counties, but was given authority to recommend proposals that would significantly alter or abolish administrative areas. Accompanying legislation known as the Local Government Changes for England Regulations 1994 also established a new single-tier form of administrative unit known as a 'Unitary authority'. These new councils would be responsible for all services carried out by non-metropolitan district and county authorities within their area, thus resembling county boroughs. The county of Hereford & Worcester was to be reviewed again, despite an earlier structural review which recommended no change to the county.

Various options were put to consultation, including:

Concept	Description
Six Unitary Authorities	A single unitary authority for Herefordshire and five Worcestershire unitary authorities based on the District Council boundaries. Preference of Hereford & Worcester Association of District Councils
Three Ridings	Three unitary authorities in Herefordshire, North Worcestershire (Bromsgrove, Redditch & Wyre Forest) and South Worcestershire (Malvern, Worcester, Wychavon). This idea was supported by Wychavon D.C.
Alternative Three Ridings	The 'Greater Herefordshire' idea of a Herefordshire unitary authority, complete with Malvern Hills and Leominster districts in their entirety and two Worcestershire unitary authorities based on the North (Bromsgrove, Redditch and Wyre Forest) and South (Worcester and Wychavon). Preference of Malvern Hills District Council and supported by Leominster District Council.
Hybrid	A unitary Herefordshire and two tier Worcestershire, based on pre-1974 boundaries (excluding Stourbridge & Halesowen). Recommended by Hereford & Worcester County Council
Two Unitary Authorities	A unitary authority for both Herefordshire and Worcestershire. This was put forward by the commission as an alternative structure to the final recommendation

Other ideas put forward and discounted before the consultation stage included a complete restoration of the pre-1974 Worcestershire county boundary. This option included Stourbridge and Halesowen, as they were under the jurisdiction of Worcestershire County Council until 1 April 1974. The LGBCE deemed that this Local Government review did not include metropolitan counties (except a one-off review of Sefton on Merseyside), so there would be no change to the boundaries of Dudley Metropolitan Borough.

The Local Government Boundary Commission recommended that Hereford & Worcester should be split into three unitary authorities centred on Herefordshire, North Worcestershire and South Worcestershire. However, Parliament chose the hybrid unitary and two-tier option instead, resulting in the abolition of the county of Hereford & Worcester.

== New Worcestershire (1998 to present) ==
Fig 14: Map of 'Post-1998' Worcestershire and UK location

Hereford and Worcester County Council ceased to exist on 1 April 1998 and was replaced by the new non-metropolitan, administrative and ceremonial county of Worcestershire. The new county regained its historic border with Herefordshire, which became a unitary authority.

The former "Hereford & Worcester" districts of Redditch, Worcester, Bromsgrove, Wychavon and Wyre Forest were retained with little or no change. The Leominster and Malvern Hills districts crossed over the historic border, so a new Malvern Hills district was created from the parts of those two districts within the restored Worcestershire boundaries. The external boundaries of the new county are shown in Fig 14; they have not altered since the 1998 split.

Following the abolition of the county of Hereford & Worcester some cross-boundary organisations and resources remain shared by the two counties. These include waste management, the youth offending service, Hereford & Worcester Fire & Rescue Service and the radio station BBC Hereford & Worcester. Meanwhile, the BBC's commercial radio counterpart; Hits Radio (formerly Radio Wyvern) broadcasts to the two counties and is regarded as a single licence area by the Office of Communications. West Mercia Police is still shared with Herefordshire, Shropshire and Telford & Wrekin. The Hereford & Worcester Ambulance Service was merged into the wider West Midlands Ambulance Service NHS Foundation Trust in 2006. In April 2020; the four NHS Clinical Commissioning Groups of Herefordshire and Worcestershire were merged into one organisation.

The West Midlands legally exists to this day as a metropolitan and ceremonial county, with countywide functions such as West Midlands Police, West Midlands Fire Service and Transport for West Midlands. All of the original metropolitan counties are now combined authorities, which are 'top tier' statutory bodies resembling the former metropolitan county councils. However 'Non-Metropolitan Authority' groupings are also becoming involved with the combined authority process.

=== Devolution ===
Black Country Flag

There has been intense media debate and discussion throughout 2014 and 2015 about possible 'Combined Authorities' within the West Midlands region. The new body became known as the West Midlands Combined Authority and was formally established on 17 June 2016. The Local Government Chronicle stated that Bromsgrove, Redditch and Wyre Forest have been invited to form part of the combined authority, because of their membership of the 'Greater Birmingham & Solihull Local Enterprise Partnership'. So far; Redditch is the only Worcestershire authority to join the new combined authority as an associate 'non-constituent' member, while Bromsgrove and Wyre Forest opted not to join "at this time". Councillor Simon Geraghty (current leader of Worcestershire County Council) also stated that the county has no plans to join the combined authority, but previously refused to rule out a change of consensus, if it is felt that Worcestershire is getting left behind.

The possibility of a Worcestershire combined authority, focusing on four key areas of "transport, infrastructure planning, skills development and land planning" has been mooted by local media and politicians, but has yet to be ratified by government or established.

=== Historic county revival ===
Flag of Worcestershire

Separately, the Secretary of State for Communities and Local Government announced on St. George's Day 2013 in a symbolic move that England's historic and traditional counties still exist. They are now recognised by the government, who will now encourage the marking and continued use of such traditional county names by the existing tiers of local government and residents. A follow-up announcement in April 2014 put forward an initiative in changing planning regulations, stating that 'traditional county' names can be placed on roadsigns. The same Government department also published an online map comparing the current and historic counties. The main body of the pre-1889 boundaries appear to be acknowledged, but Worcestershire's islands including Dudley and Shipston-on-Stour are omitted. Guidance released by the Ministry of Housing, Communities and Local Government on 16 July 2019 sought to bring all of these aspects together into one document - 'Celebrating the historic counties of England'. One of the important aspects of the recent guidance has been recognition by government that historic counties still exist, and how they differentiate from 'administrative counties'. The phrase 'historic county' is also used extensively by Encyclopædia Britannica, where the main Worcestershire article includes descriptions of both the administrative and historic boundaries in the present-tense.

As part of the growing recognition of historic counties in recent years, a flag for Worcestershire was created and registered with the Flag Institute in April 2013 following a competition held by BBC Hereford & Worcester.

=== A unitary future ===
The subsequent local government restructuring in April 2009 and 2019-2023, which abolished more two-tier counties (including Shropshire, Buckinghamshire, Dorset and Cheshire) did not affect Worcestershire. The county still maintains a two-tier administrative system as per the Local Government Act 1992, although Michael Heseltine's No stone unturned: in pursuit of growth review for the Department of Business, Innovation & Skills suggested that all English local authorities should be unitary or combined authority models similar to the existing structures in Scotland and Wales. As of 2014, conversations are taking place within the local media about the positives and negatives of a possible unitary council structure within Worcestershire.

Possibilities being put forward in these discussions are broadly similar to the Local Government Boundary Commission for England proposals prior to the 'Hereford & Worcester' abolition. These ideas consist of either two unitary authorities based in North Worcestershire (Bromsgrove, Redditch, Wyre Forest) and South Worcestershire (Malvern Hills, Worcester, Wychavon) or a single countywide council as per Herefordshire. In September 2020; Redditch Borough Council's Leader said For me in Redditch, the two-tier system does not work and suggested either a merger of Worcestershire's districts into two unitary authorities, an 'across the border' solution and/or closer links with the West Midlands Combined Authority. Already the three district councils in the south of the county have successfully worked together to produce the South Worcestershire Development Plan, which replaced the existing Local Plans of these three partner councils when it was adopted in February 2016; it also superseded elements of Worcestershire County Council's County Structure Plan. There are also joint service provisions between the North Worcestershire districts including building control shared services, water management and the emergency planning and business continuity service, along with a joint economic growth strategy.

In July 2026, the UK Government announced its intention to reorganise Worcestershire into two unitary authority areas by April 2028. The county will be divided north-south, with the northern area combining the current districts of Bromsgrove, Redditch, and Wyre Forest to form a new North Worcestershire unitary authority and the southern area combining Malvern, Worcester, and Wychavon to form a new South Worcestershire unitary authority.

== Statistics ==
The table below features official statistics from the United Kingdom Census relating to Worcestershire's size and population from 1801 onwards. The statistics are compiled across England and Wales on a decennial basis by the Office for National Statistics (ONS). The population of Worcestershire increased over five-fold between 1801 and the 1971 census, reaching a peak of 693,253 people. According to the 1971 survey; Warley County Borough accounted for 163,567 people, Worcester with 73,456, while the remaining 456,230 resided within the administrative county area. However this survey was based on different external boundaries as opposed to the present county.

The current population of Worcestershire is estimated at 603,676 people, according to the 2021 census.

Census year	Worcestershire area size (Ac/km^{2})	Total Population	Total Male	Total Female
1801	N/A	139,333	67,631	71,702
1811	N/A	160,546	78,033	82,513
1821	N/A	184,424	90,259	94,165
1831	459,710 (1,860.4)	211,365	103,383	107,982
1841	459,710 (1,860.4)	233,484	114,753	118,731
1851	472,165 (1910.8)	276,926	136,956	139,970
1861	472,165 (1910.8)	307,397	150,997	156,400
1871	472,453 (1,910.78)	338,837	164,732	174,105
1881	472,453 (1,910.78)	380,283	184,205	196,078
1891	480,560 (1944.8)	385,309	184,180	201,129
1901	480,059 (1942.7)	453,734	216,680	237,054
1911	479,218 (1939.3)	526,087	250,446	275,641
1921	458,352 (1854.9)	405,842	192,938	212,904
1931	447,678 (1811.7)	420,056	201,115	218,941
1941†	N/A	N/A	N/A	N/A
1951	447,943 (1812.8)	524,783	254,607	270,176
1961	447,943 (1812.8)	569,957	278,046	291,911
1971	450,535 (1823.3)	693,253	340,645	352,608
1981‡	970,238 (3926.4)	631,756	309,454	322,302
1991‡	969,487 (3923.4)	676,747	330,646	346,101
2001	430,209 (1,741)	542,107	265,887	276,220
2011	430,209 (1,741)	566,200	278,800	287,400
2021	430,209 (1,741)	603,676	295,765	307,911

† – No census taken due to World War II

‡ – Statistics for the county of Hereford & Worcester, no individual statistics available for Worcestershire

== See also ==
- List of Worcestershire boundary changes
- List of boundary changes in the West Midlands (region)
- History of Worcestershire
