= Halfshire =

Administrative division in Worcestershire

Halfshire (Latin: Hundredum Dimidii Comitatūs, 'hundred of half (the) county') was one of the hundreds in the English county of Worcestershire. As three of the five hundreds in the county were jurisdictions exempt from the authority of the sheriff, the hundred was considered to be half what was subject to his jurisdiction, whence the name.

The hundred seems to have been formed in the mid-12th century, by amalgamating the Domesday hundreds of Came (except three of the Came manors, viz. Alvechurch, Stoke Prior and Osmerley which went to the hundred of Oswaldslow), Clent, Cresslau, and Esch, other than those parts where an ecclesiastical exempt jurisdiction existed, which were joined to the appropriate ecclesiastical hundreds about the same time.

Anciently, it contained the following manors:
Belbroughton, Bentley Pauncefoot, Bromsgrove, Chaddesley Corbett, Churchill, Church Lench, Cofton Hackett, Cradley, Doverdale, Droitwich, Dudley, Elmbridge, Elmley Lovett, Feckenham, Frankley, Hadzor, Hagley, Kidderminster, Kingsford (in Wolverley), Kings Norton, Kington, Lutley, Northfield, Oldswinford, Over Mitton (formerly in Hartlebury, but now part of Stourport), Pedmore, Rushock, Salwarpe, Stone, Stourbridge, Upton Warren, and Warley Wigorn. Of these, Kington and Church Lench were exclaves. Feckenham and Bentley Pauncefoot were also nearly exclaves until Tardebigge was added.

It also contained the extra-parochial places of Crutch, Grafton Manor, and Westwood Park.

By the late 17th century the hundred was administered in two divisions. The court for the lower division met at Churchill "under a great tree".

== Halfshire's Exclaves and Enclaves ==
The following map and accompanying table is a breakdown of the exclaves, enclaves and parishes incorporated into Halfshire hundred between 1844 (following enactment of the Counties (Detached Parts) Act 1844) and the creation of the district council structure in 1894. For clarity, the map and table includes Halfshire's own parishes that were enclaves of other Worcestershire hundreds, and also the location of Upper Arley's inclusion in 1895.

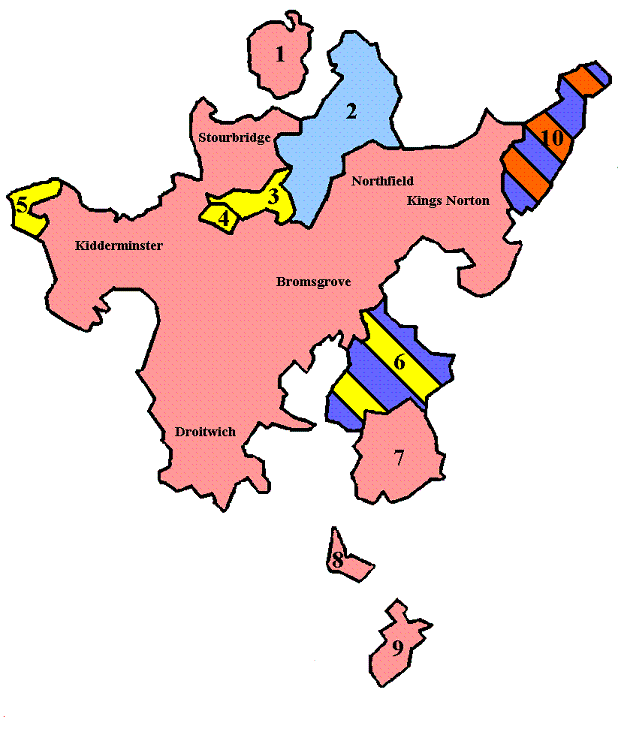
Map of the Worcestershire Hundred of Halfshire (C19) – with enclaves and exclaves

| Number | Parish/Placename | County and Hundred (before 1844) | County and Hundred (1844–1894) | Notes |
|---|---|---|---|---|
| 1 | Dudley | Worcestershire, Halfshire | Worcestershire, Halfshire | Became a Municipal Borough in 1865, superseded by County Borough status in 1889. |
| 2 | Halesowen (excluding Warley Wigorn, Cradley and Lutley) | Shropshire, Brimstree | Worcestershire, Halfshire | Warley Wigorn merged with Warley Salop, plus parts of Ridgacre and Oldbury to form Warley Parish in 1884. |
| 3 | Clent | Staffordshire, Seisdon South | Worcestershire, Halfshire | Seisdon Hundred: the Chapelry of Rowley Regis was originally dependent on Clent |
| 4 | Broome | Staffordshire, Seisdon South | Worcestershire, Halfshire | |
| 5 | Upper Arley | Staffordshire, Seisdon South | Staffordshire, Seisdon South | Transferred to Worcestershire in 1895 |
| 6 | Tardebigge (now Tutnall and Cobley) | Warwickshire, Barlinchway | Worcestershire, Halfshire | Also formerly part of Staffordshire (Seisdon Hundred) |
| 7 | Feckenham | Worcestershire, Halfshire | Worcestershire, Halfshire | No change |
| 8 | Kington | Worcestershire, Halfshire | Worcestershire, Halfshire | No change |
| 9 | Church Lench | Worcestershire, Halfshire | Worcestershire, Halfshire | No change |
| 10 | Yardley | Worcestershire, Pershore | Worcestershire, Halfshire | Formerly part of Pershore Hundred, Policing duties transferred to Warwickshire between 1857 and 1899 |
