= Stone, Worcestershire =

Village in Worcestershire, England

Coordinates: 52.374°N 2.209°W

Stone
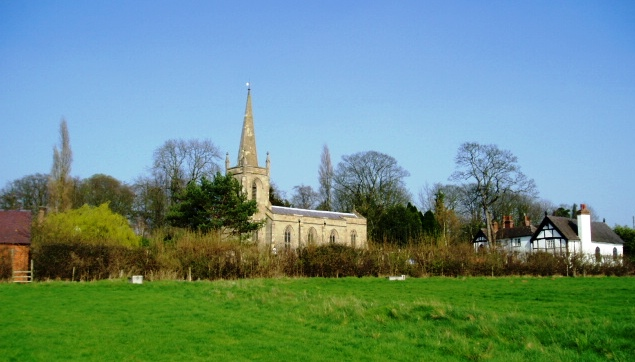
- Stone Church & Church House

- Location within Worcestershire
- Population: 793 (2021)
- OS grid reference: SO858751
- Civil parish: Stone
- District: Wyre Forest
- Shire county: Worcestershire
- Region: West Midlands
- Country: England
- Sovereign state: United Kingdom
- Post town: KIDDERMINSTER
- Postcode district: DY10
- Dialling code: 01562
- Police: West Mercia
- Fire: Hereford and Worcester
- Ambulance: West Midlands

Stone is a village and civil parish in the Wyre Forest District of Worcestershire, England. Of Anglo-Saxon origin, it lies two miles south-east of Kidderminster on the A448 road to Bromsgrove. It had a population of 793 in 2021.

== History ==
Stone (then spelt Stanes) was recorded in the Domesday Book (1086) as a formerly Anglo-Saxon manor with an associated mill lying within the Cresslow Hundred. Some 24 people then lived in the village. Immediately adjoining it downhill was the separate but smaller manor of Dunclent. After Cresslow was combined with others to create the larger Halfshire, what was by then the parish of Stone also included the settlements of Dunclent, Shenstone, Stanklin and part of Hoobrook.

Stone Inclosure Act 1763
- Act of Parliament
- Parliament of Great Britain
- Long title: An Act for dividing and enclosing Stone Common, within the Manor and Parish of Stone, in the County of Worcester.
- Citation: 3 Geo. 3. c. 33 Pr.
- Territorial extent: Great Britain

Dates
- Royal assent: 12 April 1763
- Commencement: 25 November 1762 (Note: Start of session)

Status: Current legislation

Stone Common was enclosed under the Stone Inclosure Act 1763 (3 Geo. 3. c. 33 Pr.), and on its excellent soil were raised crops of wheat, barley, potatoes and beans. There were once two mills within the village boundary, one of which spun yarn for the carpet works at Kidderminster. Towards the end of the 19th century there were 104 houses in the area, with a population of 475. Included in this number were the large dwellings at Stone House, the Hoo, Dunclent House and Spennell House. At the 2001 census the area had a population of 782.

The early 18th-century Stone House, situated just behind the church, is noted for its walled gardens and associated nursery, set up in the mid-1970s. The property was Grade II listed as a historic building in 1958. On its edge is the steep cleft of Fenny Rough, known locally as a dingle, in which is to be found the Devil's Den, and "concerning which some horrifying tales are told of the fatal results happening to persons who attempted to penetrate therein".

== St Mary’s Church ==
A chapel at Stone was dedicated in honour of the Virgin Mary in 1269 but until 1392 it was dependent on the church at Chaddesley Corbett. Presently it lies within the Anglican Diocese of Worcester but is under the patronage of the Lord Chancellor. After the building was badly damaged by fire, it was rebuilt in 1831–2 with a tower and six bells, and the chancel was enlarged in 1899–1900. One of the windows incorporates some pieces of medieval and 17th-century stained glass; some 17th-century memorial brasses also remain. The church has been a Grade II listed building since 1958.

Adjacent to it is Church House, which has also functioned as a school and parish room, and parts of which date from the 16th century. Both the church and school were supported by various financial endowments, including income from fields in the parish and "some lands near Stourbridge containing clay for making fire-bricks". In the churchyard is a war memorial using the restored base and steps of a medieval preaching cross. Also there is the grave of the racing driver Peter Collins, who came from nearby Mustow Green.
