= Ab Lench =

Village in Worcestershire, England

Coordinates: 52.15°N 1.966667°W

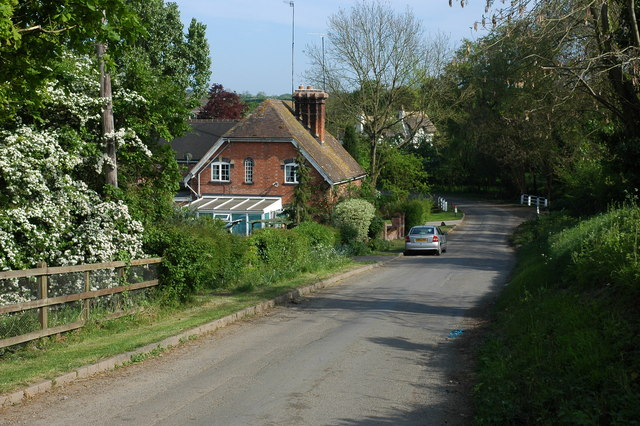

- Location within Worcestershire
- OS grid reference: SP022502
  - London: 90 mi (140 km) SE
- Civil parish: South Lenches
- District: Wychavon
- Shire county: Worcestershire
- Region: West Midlands
- Country: England
- Sovereign state: United Kingdom
- Post town: EVESHAM
- Postcode district: WR11
- Dialling code: 01386
- Police: West Mercia
- Fire: Hereford and Worcester
- Ambulance: West Midlands
- UK Parliament: Redditch

Ab Lench is a village and former civil parish, now in the parish of South Lenches, in the Wychavon district, in the county of Worcestershire, England. The village lies 1 mile (1.6 km) from Church Lench and Rous Lench, 2 miles (3 km) from Harvington and 4 miles (6.4 km) from Ragley Hall. It is about 15 miles (24 km) from Stratford and 6 miles (10 km) from Evesham.

== History ==
The name Lench derives from the Old English hlenc meaning 'extensive hill slope'. The prefix Ab derives from the Old English personal name Abba.

Ab Lench was recorded in the Domesday Book of 1086.

Ab Lench was classed as a civil parish from 1866 to 1 April 1933 when it was merged with Church Lench. The parish of Ab Lench comprised an area of 884 acres (3.58 km^{2}) and had a population of 89 in 1801. This fell to 41 in 1901 and just 31 in 1921. The population had increased again to 57 by 1931, shortly before the parish was merged. The village has also been known as "Abbots Lench", as recorded in the 1911 census, and "Hob Lench" as noted by the Royal Historical Society in 1991.
