= South Lenches =

Civil parish in Worcestershire, England

Coordinates: 52.15964°N 1.963°W

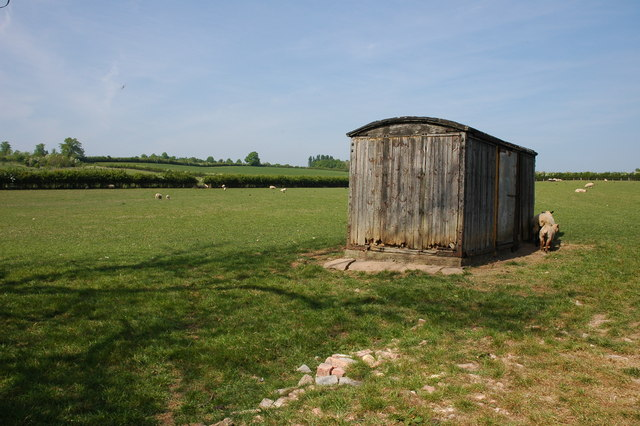
- Former railway rolling stock, near Church Lench, pictured in 2007

- Location within Worcestershire
- Population: 708 (2021)
- OS grid reference: SP021512
- Civil parish: South Lenches
- District: Wychavon
- Shire county: Worcestershire
- Region: West Midlands
- Country: England
- Sovereign state: United Kingdom
- Post town: EVESHAM
- Postcode district: WR11
- Police: West Mercia
- Fire: Hereford and Worcester
- Ambulance: West Midlands
- UK Parliament: Redditch

South Lenches, formerly called Church Lench, is a civil parish in Wychavon district, Worcestershire, England, on the border with Warwickshire. It includes the settlements of Church Lench, Ab Lench, Atch Lench and Sheriffs Lench. According to the 2021 census, the parish population was 708.

== History ==
The word "Lench" is derived from the Old English word hlenc, meaning an "extensive hill-slope". The earliest references to settlements in the area originates from the seventh-century AD, when the region of what is now Worcestershire became part of the Kingdom of Mercia. After the Norman Conquest in 1066, land covering Rous Lench and Sheriffs Lench was granted to Urse d'Abetot, and the "Lenches" were recorded in the Domesday Book of 1086. Sheriffs Lench was then held by the heirs of Urse (also the hereditary Sheriffs of Worcestershire) for three centuries, with the land eventually being passed on to George Plantagenet, Duke of Clarence. In 1478, Clarence was convicted of treason and executed, with his estates being passed to the Crown.

Rous Lench is named after the Rous dynasty, who first became landowners in the area in 1381. Throughout the centuries, the family continued to be the area's principal landowners until 1876, when Sir Charles Henry Rouse-Boughton sold his lands to Dr William Kyle Westwood Chafy. Following Chafy's death in 1916, the Chafy family eventually sold the remaining land to private owners.

On 1 Jaunuary 2013, the parish was renamed from "Church Lench" to "South Lenches".

== Geography ==
The parish consists of four distinct settlements, or "Lenches". They are the village of Church Lench, and the hamlets of Ab Lench, Atch Lench and Sheriffs Lench. The modern-day parish does not include Rous Lench, which lies to the north of the parish. The parish borders the county of Warwickshire to the east, and is located about 5 miles from the nearest town, Evesham.

== Politics ==
The Lenches lie within the Redditch parliament constituency, represented in the House of Commons by Chris Bloore MP of the Labour Party. It is within the non-metropolitan district of Wychavon and the non-metropolitan county of Worcestershire, governed by Worcestershire County Council.

== Demographics ==
At the 2021 UK census, the parish population was recorded as 708, an increase from 675 in 2011. The largest ethnic group is White people, comprising 98.4% of the population. The dominant religious group is Christianity at 66.8%, followed by no religion at 31.4%.
