= Doverdale =

Village in Worcestershire, England

Coordinates: 52.293°N 2.205°W

- Civil parish
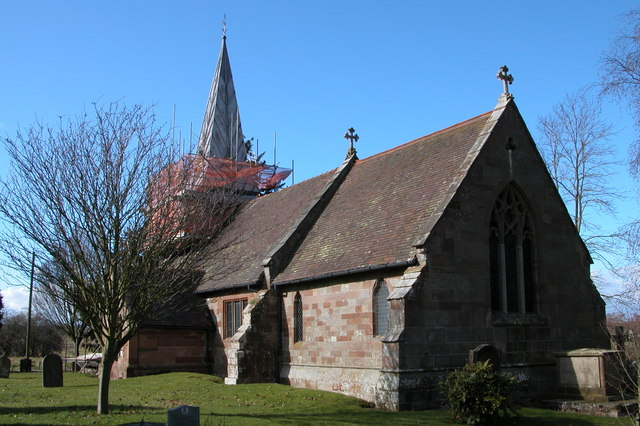
- St Mary's Church

- Location within Worcestershire
- Population: 57 (Parish, 2021)
- Civil parish: Doverdale
- District: Wychavon
- Shire county: Worcestershire
- Region: West Midlands
- Country: England
- Sovereign state: United Kingdom
- Post town: Droitwich
- Postcode district: WR9

Doverdale is a small village and civil parish in the Wychavon district of Worcestershire, England. It lies to the west of Droitwich. At the 2021 census the parish had a population of 57. Since 1973 it has shared a grouped parish council with the neighbouring parish of Ombersley.

== History ==
Doverdale was historically a manor. It appears in the Domesday Book of 1086 as "Lunvredele", when it was owned by Urse d'Abetot and formed part of the Cresslow hundred of Worcestershire. A priest and church were mentioned, suggesting it had already become a parish by that time. Cresslow hundred was subsequently merged into Halfshire hundred.

The current parish church, dedicated to St Mary, is believed to have been built in the 14th century, presumably replacing the church mentioned in the Domesday Book. A moated manor house, which possibly predated the Norman Conquest, stood adjoining the church. This house subsequently became known as Moat Farm, and was destroyed by fire in 1850.

A newer manor house, Doverdale Manor, was built at the northern end of the parish in the early 18th century. As of April 2022 there are six listed buildings in the parish.

== Governance ==
There are three tiers of local government covering Doverdale, at parish, district and county level: Ombersley and Doverdale Parish Council, Wychavon District Council, and Worcestershire County Council. The parish council is a grouped parish council, established in 1973 to cover the two parishes of Doverdale and Ombersley. They remain legally separate civil parishes, although they are sometimes inaccurately described as being a single parish.
