= List of boundary changes in the West Midlands (region) =

Map of the West Midlands

This is a list of boundary changes occurring in the West Midlands region of England, since the re-organisation of local government following the passing of the Local Government Act 1972.

== Administrative boundaries ==
=== Initial creation ===
When the Local Government Act 1972 was passed there were still some details left to be decided, the Local Government Boundary Commission for England's first work was to clarify these details.

Date	Statutory Instrument	LGBCE Report
1 February 1973	The English Non-Metropolitan Districts (Definition) Order 1972	Report No. 001: Recommendations for new Districts in the non-Metropolitan Counties November 1972
1 May 1973	The English Non-Metropolitan Districts (Names) Order 1973	Report No. 002: Names of Non-Metropolitan Districts March 1973
1 April 1973	The Metropolitan Districts (Names) Order 1973	n/a

=== Principal Area Boundary Reviews ===
The Local Government Boundary Commission for England (or LGBCE) was established by the Local Government Act 1972 to review the administrative boundaries of every local authority in England. Between 1974 and 1992 they completed a series of Principal Area Boundary Reviews; reviewing the administrative boundaries of local authorities at their request.

Date	Statutory Instrument	Effect	LGBCE Report(s)
1 April 1985	The Hereford and Worcester (Areas) Order 1985	Changes to the boundaries of: Leominster (Hereford and Worcester); Malvern Hills (Hereford and Worcester); South Herefordshire (Hereford and Worcester); Wychavon (Hereford and Worcester); Wyre Forest (Hereford and Worcester)	Report No. 442: Malvern Hills/Leominster/South Herefordshire/Wychavon/Wyre Forest March 1983
1 April 1986	The Shropshire (District Boundaries) Order 1985	Changes to the Shrewsbury and Atcham/South Shropshire (both Shropshire) boundary	Report No. 484: South Shropshire/Shrewsbury and Atcham November 1984
1 April 1987	The Shropshire (District Boundaries) Order 1986	Changes to the Shrewsbury and Atcham/The Wrekin (both Shropshire) boundary	Report No. 496: Shrewsbury and Atcham/The Wrekin July 1985
1 April 1987	The Hereford and Worcester (District Boundaries) Order 1987	Changes to the: Malvern Hills/Worcester (both Hereford and Worcester) boundary; Worcester/Wychavon (both Hereford and Worcester) boundary	Report No. 446: Wychavon/Malvern Hills June 1983; Report No. 511: Worcester/Malvern Hills/Wychavon November 1985
1 April 1988	The Shropshire (District Boundaries) Order 1987	Changes to the North Shropshire/Shrewsbury and Atcham (both Shropshire) boundary	Report No. 516: North Shropshire/Shrewsbury and Atcham August 1986
1 April 1988	The Hereford and Worcester (District Boundaries) Order 1988	Changes to the Leominster/South Herefordshire (both Hereford and Worcester) boundary	Report No. 523: Leominster/South Herefordshire December 1986
1 April 1988	The West Midlands (District Boundaries) Order 1988	Changes to the Birmingham/Solihull (both West Midlands) boundary	Report No. 524: Birmingham/Solihull December 1986
1 April 1993	The Stafford and Staffordshire Moorlands (District Boundaries) Order 1992	Changes to the Stafford/Staffordshire Moorlands (both Staffordshire) boundary	Report No. 619: Staffordshire Moorlands/Stafford October 1991

Other principal area boundary reviews

- Report No. 379: Tamworth/Lichfield March 1980
- Report No. 463: Newcastle-under-Lyme/Stoke-on-Trent April 1984

=== Mandatory Reviews of non-Metropolitan Counties, Metropolitan Districts and London Boroughs ===
In 1985 they began the first full administrative review of all non-metropolitan counties. Their reviews of metropolitan counties and Greater London began in 1987 and both reviews were completed in 1992.

Date	Statutory Instrument	Effect	LGBCE Report(s)
1 April 1988	The Northamptonshire and Warwickshire (County Boundaries) Order 1988	Changes to the Daventry (Northamptonshire)/Rugby (Warwickshire) boundary	Report No. 539: Northamptonshire August 1987
1 April 1991	The Cheshire, Derbyshire, Hereford and Worcester and Staffordshire (County Boundaries) Order 1991	Changes to the: Congleton (Cheshire)/Newcastle-under-Lyme (Staffordshire) boundary; Wyre Forest (Hereford and Worcester)/South Staffordshire (Staffordshire) boundary; High Peak (Derbyshire)/Staffordshire Moorlands (Staffordshire) boundary; Derbyshire Dales (Derbyshire)/Staffordshire Moorlands (Staffordshire) boundary; Derbyshire Dales (Derbyshire)/East Staffordshire (Staffordshire) boundary; South Derbyshire (Derbyshire)/East Staffordshire (Staffordshire) boundary; South Derbyshire (Derbyshire)/South Staffordshire (Staffordshire) boundary; South Derbyshire (Derbyshire)/Lichfield (Staffordshire) boundary	Report No. 582: Staffordshire February 1990
1 April 1991	The Derbyshire, Leicestershire, Lincolnshire, Nottinghamshire and Warwickshire (County Boundaries) Order 1991	Changes to the: North Warwickshire (Warwickshire)/Hinckley and Bosworth (Leicestershire); South Derbyshire (Derbyshire)/North West Leicestershire (Leicestershire); North West Leicestershire (Leicestershire)/Rushcliffe (Nottinghamshire); South Kesteven (Lincolnshire)/Rutland (Leicestershire) boundary	Report No. 577: Leicestershire October 1989
1 April 1991	The Hereford and Worcester and Shropshire (County Boundaries) Order 1991	Changes to the Wyre Forest (Hereford and Worcester)/Bridgnorth (Shropshire) boundary	Report No. 573: Shropshire February 1989
1 April 1992	The Cheshire, Derbyshire, Hereford and Worcester and Staffordshire (County Boundaries) (Variation) Order 1992	n/a	n/a
1 April 1994	The Hereford and Worcester and Warwickshire (County Boundaries) Order 1993	Changes to the: Bromsgrove (Hereford and Worcester)/Stratford-on-Avon (Warwickshire) boundary; Wychavon (Hereford and Worcester)/Stratford-on-Avon (Warwickshire) boundary; Redditch (Hereford and Worcester)/Stratford-on-Avon (Warwickshire) boundary	Report No. 592: Hereford and Worcester November 1990
1 April 1995	The Hereford and Worcester and West Midlands (County Boundaries) Order 1993	Changes to the Bromsgrove (Hereford and Worcester)/Birmingham (West Midlands) boundary	Report No. 629: Birmingham (Bromsgrove) February 1992; Report No. 683: Birmingham (Bromsgrove) (Electoral Consequentials) August 1992
1 April 1994	The Hereford and Worcester, Staffordshire and West Midlands (County and Metropolitan Borough Boundaries) Order 1993	Changes to the: Bromsgrove (Hereford and Worcester)/Dudley (West Midlands) boundary; South Staffordshire (Staffordshire)/Dudley (West Midlands) boundary; South Staffordshire (Staffordshire)/Walsall (West Midlands) boundary; South Staffordshire (Staffordshire)/Wolverhampton (West Midlands) boundary; Lichfield (Staffordshire)/Walsall (West Midlands) boundary; Birmingham/Sandwell (both West Midlands) boundary; Dudley/Sandwell (both West Midlands) boundary; Sandwell/Walsall (both West Midlands) boundary; Dudley/Wolverhampton (both West Midlands) boundary; Walsall/Wolverhampton (both West Midlands) boundary; Wolverhampton/Sandwell (both West Midlands) boundary	Report No. 685: Dudley/Sandwell/Walsall/Wolverhampton September 1992
1 April 1994	The Hereford and Worcester, Warwickshire and West Midlands (County and Metropolitan Borough Boundaries) Order 1993	Changes to the: Bromsgrove (Hereford and Worcester)/Solihull (West Midlands) boundary; North Warwickshire (Warwickshire)/Solihull (West Midlands) boundary; Stratford-on-Avon (Warwickshire)/Solihull (West Midlands) boundary; Warwick (Warwickshire)/Solihull (West Midlands) boundary; Birmingham/Solihull (both West Midlands) boundary	Report No. 682: Solihull August 1992
1 April 1994	The Staffordshire, Warwickshire and West Midlands (County Boundaries) Order 1993	Changes to the: North Warwickshire (Warwickshire)/Birmingham (West Midlands) boundary; Birmingham (West Midlands)/Lichfield (Staffordshire) boundary	Report No. 678: Birmingham (Sutton Coldfield) August 1992
1 April 1994	The Warwickshire and West Midlands (County and District Boundaries) Order 1993	Changes to the: Rugby (Warwickshire)/Coventry (West Midlands) boundary; Nuneaton and Bedworth (Warwickshire)/Coventry (West Midlands) boundary; North Warwickshire (Warwickshire)/Coventry (West Midlands) boundary; Warwick (Warwickshire)/Coventry (West Midlands) boundary; Solihull (West Midlands)/Warwick (Warwickshire) boundary; Warwick/Rugby (both Warwickshire) boundary; Coventry/Solihull (both West Midlands) boundary	Report No. 628: Coventry February 1992; Report No. 679: Coventry (Electoral Consequentials) August 1992

Other mandatory meviews of non-metropolitan counties, metropolitan districts and London boroughs

- Report No. 574: Gloucestershire February 1989
- Report No. 579: Warwickshire January 1990

== Electoral boundaries ==
=== Initial creation ===
When the Local Government Act 1972 was passed there was not sufficient time to draw up proper electoral boundaries for the new county and district councils, so a temporary system was quickly put in place, intended to only be used for the first elections in 1973.

Date	Statutory Instrument
7 June 1973	The County of Hereford and Worcester (District Wards) Order 1973
12 April 1973	The County of Hereford and Worcester (Electoral Divisions) Order 1973
7 June 1973	The County of Salop (District Wards) Order 1973
12 April 1973	The County of Salop (Electoral Divisions) Order 1973
7 June 1973	The County of Staffordshire (District Wards) Order 1973
12 April 1973	The County of Staffordshire (Electoral Divisions) Order 1973
7 June 1973	The County of Warwickshire (District Wards) Order 1973
12 April 1973	The County of Warwickshire (Electoral Divisions) Order 1973
12 April 1973 & 10 May 1973	The County of West Midlands (Electoral Divisions and Wards) Order 1973

=== First periodic review ===
The Local Government Boundary Commission for England (or LGBCE) was established by the Local Government Act 1972 to review the electoral boundaries of every local authority in England. In 1974 they began the first full electoral review of all metropolitan and non-metropolitan districts, completing it in July 1980. Their reviews of the county councils were completed in 1984.

Date	Statutory Instrument	LGBCE Report
6 May 1976	The Borough of Oswestry (Electoral Arrangements) Order 1975	Report No. 084: Oswestry October 1975
6 May 1976	The Borough of Shrewsbury and Atcham (Electoral Arrangements) Order 1975	Report No. 047: Shrewsbury and Atcham September 1975
6 May 1976	The Borough of Tamworth (Electoral Arrangements) Order 1975	Report No. 013: Tamworth March 1975
3 May 1979	The Borough of North Warwickshire (Electoral Arrangements) Order 1976	Report No. 151: North Warwickshire May 1976
3 May 1979	The Borough of Stafford (Electoral Arrangements) Order 1976	Report No. 139: Stafford January 1976
3 May 1979	The City of Stoke-on-Trent (Electoral Arrangements) Order 1976	Report No. 155: Stoke-on-Trent July 1976
3 May 1979	The District of Bridgnorth (Electoral Arrangements) Order 1976	Report No. 154: Bridgnorth June 1976
6 May 1976	The District of Cannock Chase (Electoral Arrangements) Order 1976	Report No. 100: Cannock Chase October 1975
3 May 1979	The District of Lichfield (Electoral Arrangements) Order 1976	Report No. 138: Lichfield January 1976
3 May 1979	The District of Malvern Hills (Electoral Arrangements) Order 1976	Report No. 159: Malvern Hills July 1976
6 May 1976	The District of North Shropshire (Electoral Arrangements) Order 1976	Report No. 120: North Shropshire December 1975
6 May 1976	The District of South Shropshire (Electoral Arrangements) Order 1976	Report No. 074: South Shropshire October 1975
6 May 1976	The District of Staffordshire Moorlands (Electoral Arrangements) Order 1976	Report No. 114: Staffordshire Moorlands November 1975
3 May 1979	The Borough of Nuneaton (Electoral Arrangements) Order 1977	Report No. 180: Nuneaton December 1976
3 May 1979	The City of Hereford (Electoral Arrangements) Order 1977	Report No. 168: City of Hereford October 1976
3 May 1979	The City of Worcester (Electoral Arrangements) Order 1977	Report No. 171: City of Worcester October 1976
3 May 1979	The District of Bromsgrove (Electoral Arrangements) Order 1977	Report No. 179: Bromsgrove March 1977
3 May 1979	The District of East Staffordshire (Electoral Arrangements) Order 1977	Report No. 189: East Staffordshire March 1977
3 May 1979	The District of South Herefordshire (Electoral Arrangements) Order 1977	Report No. 163: South Herefordshire August 1976
3 May 1979	The District of South Staffordshire (Electoral Arrangements) Order 1977	Report No. 202: South Staffordshire June 1977
3 May 1979	The District of Stratford-on-Avon (Electoral Arrangements) Order 1977	Report No. 186: Stratford-on-Avon February 1977
3 May 1979	The Borough of Newcastle-under-Lyme (Electoral Arrangements) Order 1978	Report No. 200: Newcastle-under-Lyme May 1977
3 May 1979	The Borough of Rugby (Electoral Arrangements) Order 1978	Report No. 298: Rugby October 1978
3 May 1979	The Borough of Sandwell (Electoral Arrangements) Order 1978	Report No. 181: Sandwell December 1976
3 May 1979	The Borough of Solihull (Electoral Arrangements) Order 1978	Report No. 246: Solihull August 1977
3 May 1979	The District of Leominster (Electoral Arrangements) Order 1978	Report No. 307: Leominster October 1978
3 May 1979	The District of The Wrekin (Electoral Arrangements) Order 1978	Report No. 281: The Wrekin August 1978
3 May 1979	The District of Wychavon (Electoral Arrangements) Order 1978	Report No. 242: Wychavon August 1977
3 May 1979	The District of Wyre Forest (Electoral Arrangements) Order 1978	Report No. 240: Wyre Forest August 1977
1 May 1980	The Borough of Walsall (Electoral Arrangements) Order 1979	Report No. 310: Walsall November 1978
1 May 1980	The City of Coventry (Electoral Arrangements) Order 1979	Report No. 316: Coventry January 1979
5 May 1983	The District of Warwick (Electoral Arrangements) Order 1979	Report No. 332: Warwick May 1979
6 May 1982	The Borough of Dudley (Electoral Arrangements) Order 1980	Report No. 336: Dudley May 1979
6 May 1982	The Borough of Wolverhampton (Electoral Arrangements) Order 1980	Report No. 340: Wolverhampton June 1979
6 May 1982	The City of Birmingham (Electoral Arrangements) Order 1980	Report No. 351: Birmingham October 1979
7 May 1981	The County of Shropshire (Electoral Arrangements) Order 1980	Report No. 382: Shropshire May 1980
7 May 1981	The County of Staffordshire (Electoral Arrangements) Order 1980	Report No. 386: Staffordshire July 1980
5 May 1983	The District of Redditch (Electoral Arrangements) Order 1980	Report No. 356: Redditch October 1979
7 May 1981	The County of Warwickshire (Electoral Arrangements) Order 1981	Report No. 409: Warwickshire December 1980
2 May 1985	The County of West Midlands (Electoral Arrangements) Order 1982	Report No. 419: West Midlands October 1981
2 May 1985	The County of Hereford and Worcester (Electoral Arrangements) Order 1983	Report No. 440: Hereford and Worcester February 1983

=== Further electoral reviews by the LGBCE ===
Local authorities could request a further review if they felt that there were changes in circumstances since the initial review. The LGBCE would only approve this if they felt it was appropriate because of major changes in the size or distribution of the electorate.

Date	Statutory Instrument	LGBCE Report
7 May 1987	The Borough of Tamworth (Electoral Arrangements) Order 1985	Report No. 470: Tamworth April 1984
4 May 1989 & 2 May 1991	The District of South Staffordshire (Electoral Arrangements) Order 1989	Report No. 543: South Staffordshire November 1987
2 May 1991	The District of South Herefordshire (Electoral Arrangements) Order 1991	Report No. 583: South Herefordshire May 1990

=== Second periodic review ===
The Local Government Act 1992 established the Local Government Commission for England (or LGCE) as the successor to the LGBCE. In 1996 they began the second full electoral review of English local authorities. On 1 April 2002 the Boundary Committee for England (or BCfE) took over the functions of the LGBCE and carried on the review, completing it in 2004.

Date	Statutory Instrument	LGCE/BCfE Report(s)
4 May 1995	The District of Bromsgrove (Electoral Arrangements) Order 1995	n/a (merges two wards together)
1 May 1997	The District of The Wrekin (Parishes and Electoral Changes) Order 1997	Draft report 3 September 1996 Final report 6 December 1996
1 May 2003	The Borough of North Warwickshire (Electoral Changes) Order 2000	Draft report May 1999 Final report November 1999
2 May 2002	The Borough of Nuneaton and Bedworth (Electoral Changes) Order 2000	Draft report May 1999 Final report November 1999
1 May 2003	The Borough of Oswestry (Electoral Changes) Order 2000	Draft report March 1999 Final report August 1999
2 May 2002	The Borough of Rugby (Electoral Changes) Order 2000; The Borough of Rugby (Electoral Changes) (No.2) Order 2000	Draft report May 1999 Final report November 1999
2 May 2002	The Borough of Shrewsbury and Atcham (Electoral Changes) Order 2000	Draft report March 1999 Final report August 1999
1 May 2003	The District of Bridgnorth (Electoral Changes) Order 2000	Draft report March 1999 Final report August 1999
1 May 2003	The District of North Shropshire (Electoral Changes) Order 2000; The District of North Shropshire (Electoral Changes) (Amendment) Order 2006	Draft report March 1999 Final report August 1999
1 May 2003	The District of South Shropshire (Electoral Changes) Order 2000; The District of South Shropshire (Electoral Changes) (Amendment) Order 2000	Draft report March 1999 Final report August 1999
2 May 2002	The District of Stratford-on-Avon (Electoral Changes) Order 2000	Draft report May 1999 Final report November 1999
1 May 2003	The District of Warwick (Electoral Changes) Order 2000	Draft report May 1999 Final report November 1999
1 May 2003	The Borough of East Staffordshire (Electoral Changes) Order 2001	Draft report 9 May 2000 Final report 10 October 2000
2 May 2002	The Borough of Newcastle-under-Lyme (Electoral Changes) Order 2001	Draft report 9 May 2000 Final report 10 October 2000
1 May 2003	The Borough of Stafford (Electoral Changes) Order 2001	Draft report 9 May 2000 Final report 10 October 2000
2 May 2002	The Borough of Tamworth (Electoral Changes) Order 2001	Draft report 9 May 2000 Final report 10 October 2000
2 May 2002	The City of Stoke-on-Trent (Electoral Changes) Order 2001	Draft report 9 May 2000 Final report 10 October 2000
2 May 2002	The District of Cannock Chase (Electoral Changes) Order 2001	Draft report 9 May 2000 Final report 10 October 2000
1 May 2003	The District of Lichfield (Electoral Changes) Order 2001	Draft report 9 May 2000 Final report 10 October 2000
1 May 2003	The District of South Staffordshire (Electoral Changes) Order 2001	Draft report 9 May 2000 Final report 10 October 2000
1 May 2003	The District of Staffordshire Moorlands (Electoral Changes) Order 2001; The District of Staffordshire Moorlands (Electoral Changes) (Amendment) Order 2004	Draft report 9 May 2000 Final report 10 October 2000
10 June 2004	The Borough of Redditch (Electoral Changes) Order 2002	Draft report 26 February 2002 Final report 30 July 2002
1 May 2003	The Borough of Telford and Wrekin (Electoral Changes) Order 2002	Draft report 9 October 2001 Final report 3 April 2002
10 June 2004	The City of Worcester (Electoral Changes) Order 2002	Draft report 26 February 2002 Final report 30 July 2002
1 May 2003	The County of Herefordshire District Council (Electoral Changes) Order 2002	Draft report 9 January 2001 Final report 31 July 2001
1 May 2003	The District of Malvern Hills (Electoral Changes) Order 2002	Draft report 26 March 2002 Final report 30 July 2002
1 May 2003	The District of Wychavon (Electoral Changes) Order 2002	Draft report 26 March 2002 Final report 30 July 2002
10 June 2004	The District of Wyre Forest (Electoral Changes) Order 2002	Draft report 26 February 2002 Final report 30 July 2002
10 June 2004	The Borough of Dudley (Electoral Changes) Order 2003	Draft report 22 October 2002 Final report 13 May 2003
10 June 2004	The Borough of Sandwell (Electoral Changes) Order 2003	Draft report 22 October 2002 Final report 13 May 2003
10 June 2004	The Borough of Solihull (Electoral Changes) Order 2003	Draft report 22 October 2002 Final report 13 May 2003
10 June 2004	The Borough of Walsall (Electoral Changes) Order 2003	Draft report 22 October 2002 Final report 13 May 2003
10 June 2004	The City of Birmingham (Electoral Changes) Order 2003	Draft report 22 October 2002 Final report 13 May 2003
10 June 2004	The City of Coventry (Electoral Changes) Order 2003	Draft report 22 October 2002 Final report 13 May 2003
10 June 2004	The City of Wolverhampton (Electoral Changes) Order 2003	Draft report 22 October 2002 Final report 13 May 2003
1 May 2003	The District of Bromsgrove (Electoral Changes) Order 2003	Draft report 26 March 2002 Final report 30 July 2002
5 May 2005	The County of Shropshire (Electoral Changes) Order 2004	Draft report 28 May 2003 Final report 27 April 2004
5 May 2005	The County of Staffordshire (Electoral Changes) Order 2004	Draft report 28 May 2003 Final report 27 April 2004
5 May 2005	The County of Warwickshire (Electoral Changes) Order 2004	Draft report 27 August 2003 Final report 27 April 2004
5 May 2005	The County of Worcestershire (Electoral Changes) Order 2005	Draft report 24 February 2004 Final report 14 September 2004

=== Further electoral reviews by the BCfE ===
Date	Statutory Instrument	BCfE Report(s)
4 June 2009	The County of Shropshire (Electoral Changes) Order 2009	Draft report July 2008 Final report November 2008

=== Further electoral reviews by the LGBCE ===
The Local Government Boundary Commission for England (or LGBCE) was established by the Local Democracy, Economic Development and Construction Act 2009 on 1 April 2010 as the successor to the BCfE. It continues to review the electoral arrangements of English local authorities on an ‘as and when’ basis.

Date	Statutory Instrument	LGBCE Report(s)
5 May 2011	The Stoke-on-Trent (Electoral Changes) Order 2011	Final report March 2010
3 May 2012	The Rugby (Electoral Changes) Order 2012	Final report September 2011
2 May 2013	The Staffordshire (Electoral Changes) Order 2012	Final report October 2011
7 May 2015	The Bromsgrove (Electoral Changes) Order 2014	Final report June 2013
7 May 2015	The Herefordshire (Electoral Changes) Order 2014	Final report March 2013
7 May 2015	The Stratford-on-Avon (Electoral Changes) Order 2014	Final report March 2014
7 May 2015	The Telford and Wrekin (Electoral Changes) Order 2014	Final report January 2014
7 May 2015	The Warwick (Electoral Changes) Order 2014	Final report March 2013
7 May 2015	The Lichfield (Electoral Changes) Order 2015	Final report November 2014
7 May 2015	The Stafford (Electoral Changes) Order 2015	Final report September 2014
7 May 2015	The Wyre Forest (Electoral Changes) Order 2015	Final report October 2014
4 May 2017	The Warwickshire (Electoral Changes) Order 2015	Final report February 2015
3 May 2018	The Birmingham (Electoral Changes) Order 2016	Final report September 2016
3 May 2018	The Newcastle-under-Lyme (Electoral Changes) Order 2017	Final report June 2017
2 May 2019	The Warwick (Electoral Changes) Order 2018	Final report August 2018
4 May 2023	The East Staffordshire (Electoral Changes) Order 2021	Final report March 2021
4 May 2023	The Malvern Hills (Electoral Changes) Order 2023	Final report September 2022
4 May 2023	The South Staffordshire (Electoral Changes) Order 2022	Final report March 2022
4 May 2023	The Stoke-on-Trent (Electoral Changes) Order 2022	Final report November 2021
4 May 2023	The Stratford-on-Avon (Electoral Changes) Order 2022	Final report March 2022
4 May 2023	The Telford and Wrekin (Electoral Changes) Order 2022	Final report August 2022
4 May 2023	The Wolverhampton (Electoral Changes) Order 2022	Final report January 2022
4 May 2023	The Wychavon (Electoral Changes) Order 2023	Final report September 2022
2 May 2024	The Cannock Chase (Electoral Changes) Order 2023	Final report May 2023
2 May 2024	The Dudley (Electoral Changes) Order 2024	Final report November 2023
2 May 2024	The Nuneaton and Bedworth (Electoral Changes) Order 2024	Final report August 2023
2 May 2024	The Redditch (Electoral Changes) Order 2023	Final report January 2023
2 May 2024	The Worcester (Electoral Changes) Order 2024	Final report August 2023
1 May 2025	The Shropshire (Electoral Changes) Order 2024	Final report October 2023
1 May 2025	The Staffordshire (Electoral Changes) Order 2024	Final report May 2024
1 May 2025	The Worcestershire (Electoral Changes) Order 2024	Final report January 2024
7 May 2026	The Coventry (Electoral Changes) Order 2024	Final report October 2023
7 May 2026	The Coventry (Electoral Changes) Order 2024	Final report October 2023
7 May 2026	The Sandwell (Electoral Changes) Order 2025	Final report September 2025
7 May 2026	The Solihull (Electoral Changes) Order 2025	Final report March 2025
7 May 2026	The Walsall (Electoral Changes) Order 2025	Final report July 2024

=== Changes resulting from parish council boundary changes ===
These orders were made to subsequent to changes to civil parish boundaries.

Date	Statutory Instrument	Cause
3 May 2007	The Rugby (Parish Electoral Arrangements and Electoral Changes) Order 2007	Creation of Cawston
3 May 2007; 4 June 2009	The Warwick (Parish Electoral Arrangements and Electoral Changes) Order 2007	Transfers of areas between the following parishes: Bishop's Tachbrook to Warwick; Bishop's Tachbrook to Whitnash; Budbrooke to Warwick; Kenilworth to Stoneleigh; Stoneleigh to Kenilworth; Warwick to Sherbourne; Warwick to Bishop's Tachbrook; Warwick to Budbrooke; Warwick to Whitnash; Whitnash to Leamington Spa; Whitnash to Warwick
1 May 2008; 4 June 2009	The Stratford-on-Avon (Parish Electoral Arrangements and Electoral Changes) Order 2008	
2 May 2013	The County of Shropshire (Electoral Changes) Order 2012	Transfers of areas between the following parishes: Oswestry to Oswestry Rural; Oswestry to Whittington; Oswestry Rural to Oswestry; Ruyton-XI-Towns to West Felton

== Structural changes ==
Date	Statutory Instrument	LGCE Report(s)
1 April 1998	The Staffordshire (City of Stoke-on-Trent) (Structural and Boundary Changes) Order 1995	Draft report July 1994 Final report December 1994
1 April 1998	The Hereford and Worcester (Structural, Boundary and Electoral Changes) Order 1996	Draft report July 1994 Final report December 1994
1 April 1998	The Shropshire (District of The Wrekin) (Structural Change) Order 1996	Draft report September 1994 Final report January 1995; Draft report September 1995 Final report December 1995
1 April 2009	The Shropshire (Structural Change) Order 2008	

Other structural reviews

- Warwickshire - Draft report July 1994 Final report December 1994
- A report on the 1992-1995 Structural Review May 1995
- Overview report of 21 Districts in England September 1995
