= Lutley =

Hamlet in the West Midlands, England

Coordinates: 52.4448°N 2.0891°W

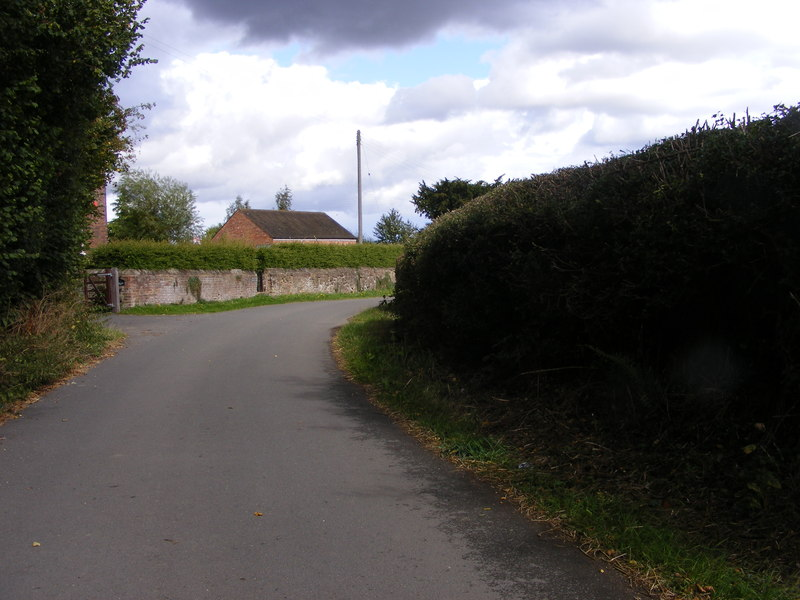

- Location within the West Midlands
- Metropolitan borough: Dudley
- Metropolitan county: West Midlands
- Region: West Midlands
- Country: England
- Sovereign state: United Kingdom

Lutley is a hamlet near Halesowen in the Dudley district, in the county of the West Midlands, England. Lutley Mill is nearby in Halesowen and is also the name of a local pub. Lutley Mill is situated on Puddings Brook. The Lutley Gutter runs through Lutley. In 1951 the parish had a population of 457.

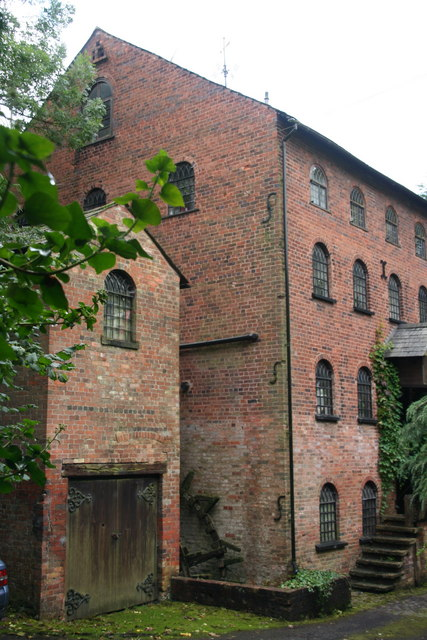
Lutley Mill

== History ==
Lutley was historically a township in the ancient parish of Halesowen. Most of the parish formed the manor of Halesowen, which was transferred from Worcestershire to become a detached part of Shropshire on being acquired to the Earl of Shrewsbury in the thirteenth century. However, Lutley was not part of the manor, belonging instead to the priests of Wolverhampton, being the only one of their possessions outside Staffordshire. The ownership resulted in the manor of Lutley being with Codsall and various other places part of the manor of the Deanery of Wolverhampton. It was therefore also one of the few parts of the parish of Halesowen to remain in Worcestershire, along with Cradley and Warley Wigorn, which were also part of the parish but not the manor of Halesowen.

In 1866 Lutley became a separate civil parish. From 1894 to 1925 it was part of Halesowen Rural District. In 1925 it was incorporated into the municipal borough of Halesowen. It remained a civil parish until 1974, but as an urban parish it had no parish council of its own after 1925, being directly administered by Halesowen Town Council. The parish was abolished in 1974 along with the borough of Halesowen, becoming part of the wider metropolitan borough of Dudley.

The original village has become a hamlet with a few farms at grid reference SO940830, while the southern portion of the township at Hayley Green has been built up in modern times, as the town of Halesowen expanded. This became as ribbon development along Hagley Road, but expanded in the 1980s with the development of Portsdown Road and the roads leading off it.

== Community facilities ==
The area contains Lutley Primary School and the Lutley Community Centre.

== See also ==
- Evolution of Worcestershire county boundaries
- History of the West Midlands
- Shropshire (Detached)
