= Broome, Worcestershire =

Village in Worcestershire, England

Coordinates: 52.403964°N 2.145102°W

Broome
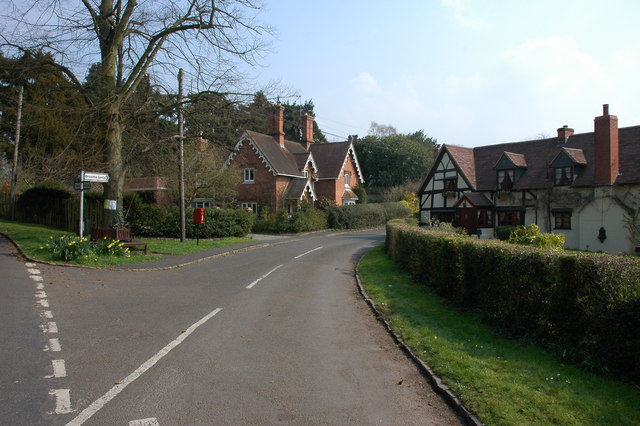
- Rose Cottage and the half-timbered Dower Cottage at the main turn into Broome

- Location within Worcestershire
- Population: 357 (2021 census)
- OS grid reference: SO9078
- Civil parish: Broome
- District: Wyre Forest
- Shire county: Worcestershire
- Region: West Midlands
- Country: England
- Sovereign state: United Kingdom
- Post town: STOURBRIDGE
- Postcode district: DY9
- Dialling code: 01562
- Police: West Mercia
- Fire: Hereford and Worcester
- Ambulance: West Midlands
- UK Parliament: Wyre Forest

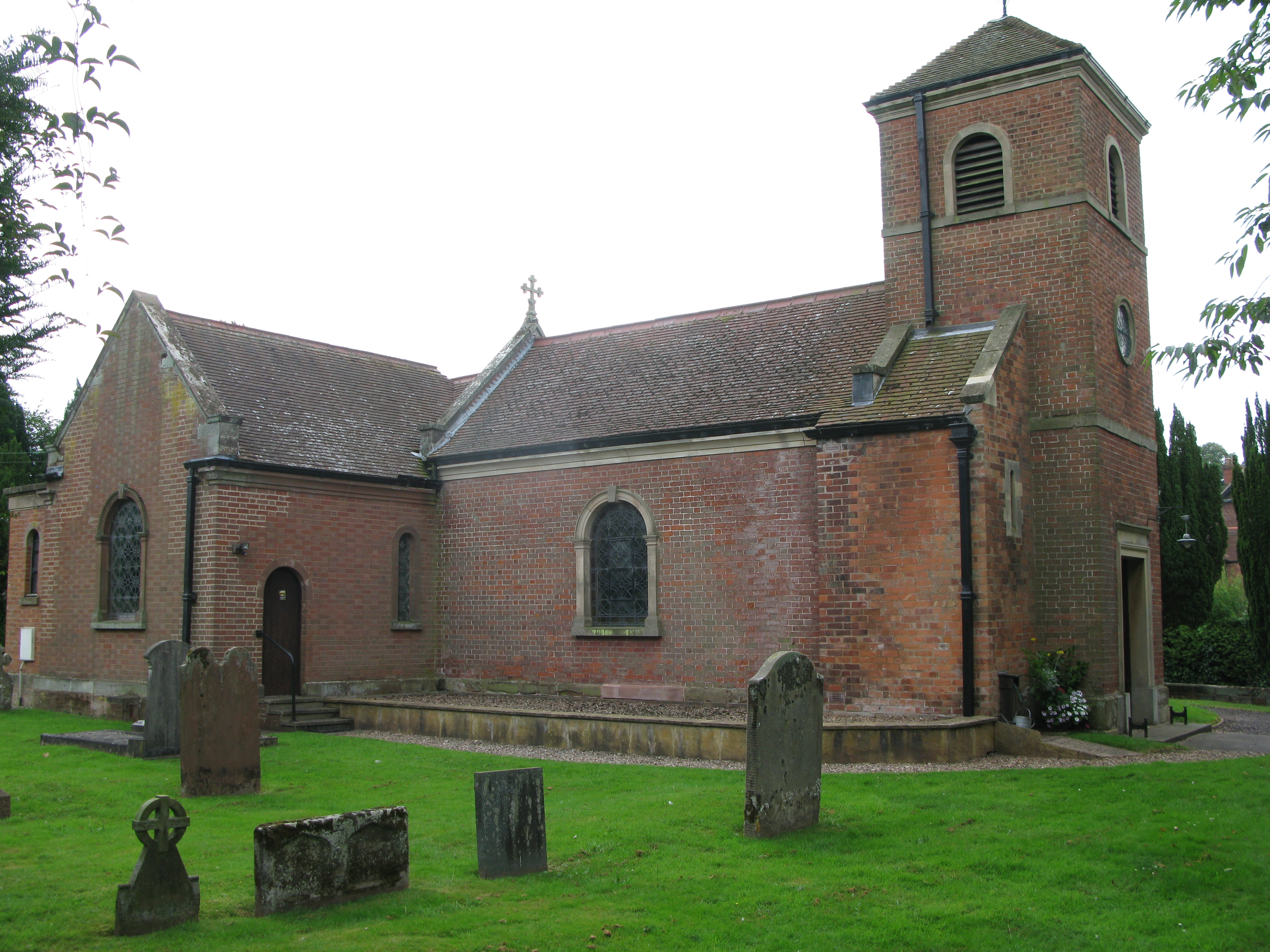
The church of St Peter

Broome is a village and civil parish in the Wyre Forest District of Worcestershire, England. The parish had a population of 357 at the 2021 census. The village is situated on the lower slopes of the Clent Hills and lies to one side of Broome Lane, a minor road that runs westwards from the outskirts of Clent to the outskirts of Hagley.

== History ==
At the time of the Domesday Book, Broome formed part of the Worcestershire manor of Clent, but was granted to a Staffordshire landowner in 1154 and remained a detached exclave of that county until transferred back to Worcestershire in 1844. Its parish bounds stretch south to include Hackman's (formerly Hangman's) Gate and the agricultural settlement of Yieldingtree beyond it, both of which have their small manor houses.

Billings Directory of 1855 records that there was never a pub in Broome, while the facetious John Noakes dismissed the village as "so devoid of notable features, that [its exclusion] would be no more noticed than the loss from Great Britain of any individual of the name of Smith". Other than farming, he continued, it was without industry. However, the old field names Nailer's Close and Kiln Pit suggest some local manufacture in its past. A stream rising on the eastern boundary also formed several pools, including one in the hall grounds stocked with fish and, at the further boundary, another serving a mill that went out of use during the 19th century.

=== Buildings ===
Until the end of World War 2, the main occupation in the village was agricultural, but now many of the smaller farms have disappeared. Top Farm, Spring Farm and Lodge Farm are private dwellings. Most of the newer houses, and the older ones which have been modernised or extended, are occupied by commuters or retired people. Several of its buildings are Grade II listed, including the 17th-century half-timbered Dower Cottage at the entrance to the village, and Old Well House, a former farm on a minor lane leading east towards the 18th-century Redhall Farm, which is also Grade II listed.

The two most substantial houses are the former 19th-century Rectory and the mixed style Broome House. The main building of the latter dates from the 18th century and has a facing of ashlar over a classical-styled front with a central Diocletian window. Behind it extend predominantly gothic features, built partly of brick and partly of the local red sandstone, in a style that has been attributed to the Warwick architects William and David Hiorn.

The church of St Peter is of ancient date and during a period of neglect the church bell once hung from an old oak tree stump in the churchyard. The church was rebuilt in brick about 1780 with its main entrance through the first stage of the tower. Inside is a marble monument designed by John Flaxman commemorating Anne Hill, who died in 1804. There is also the bowl of the original Romanesque font, restored from the former church. St Peter's was Grade II listed in 1958. From Victorian times it had a small adjoining school which closed in 1933. It is very small inside, and can only seat around 90 people. The Aisle, at 44", (112cm), is reputedly the narrowest in Worcestershire. The church now forms part of a combined ministry with the villages of Blakedown and Churchill.
