= Church Lench =

Village in Worcestershire, England

Coordinates: 52.15964°N 1.963°W

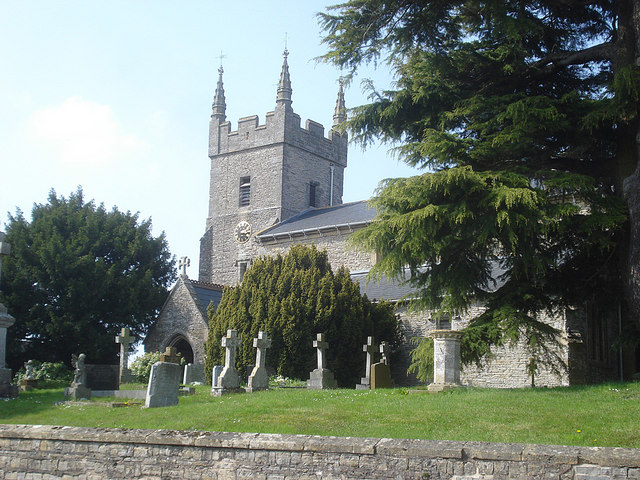
- All Saints Church, Church Lench

- Location within Worcestershire
- OS grid reference: SP026512
- Civil parish: South Lenches
- District: Wychavon
- Shire county: Worcestershire
- Region: West Midlands
- Country: England
- Sovereign state: United Kingdom
- Post town: EVESHAM
- Postcode district: WR11
- Police: West Mercia
- Fire: Hereford and Worcester
- Ambulance: West Midlands

Church Lench is a village and former civil parish, now in the parish of South Lenches, in the Wychavon district, in the county of Worcestershire, England, approximately 5.5 miles due north of Evesham and 13 miles due west of Stratford-upon-Avon. It is the largest of the surrounding Lenches, accommodating the Lenches Sports Club, the Lenches Members' Club, Church Lench First School, Church Lench preschool and the Church Lench Village Hall.

== Origin of Lench ==
The name 'Lench', shared by five local villages, comes from an Anglo-Saxon word 'linch', meaning 'rising ground, hill'. There are five Lenches. In descending order of size, they are Church Lench, Rous Lench, Atch Lench, Sheriffs Lench and Ab Lench. Ab Lench is often mistakenly called 'Abbots Lench', but this is due a clerical error confusing the name of the village with the fact that the Lenches lands were owned for some time by Evesham Abbey. Ab Lench has never gone by the name Abbots Lench.

== Parish ==
The ancient parish of Church Lench appears in the Domesday Book of 1086. Its earliest recorded history reveals that it was a gift by Kenred of Mercia to Evesham Abbey in 708. Its church, All Saints, is currently Church of England, and its earliest recorded priest was in residence in 1086. The 12th-century church was significantly extended during the 14th century and the 15th century. Church Lench has been a farming community for all of its recorded history. The subsoil is lower lias clay, the surface soil is clay and sand.

On 1 April 1933 part of the parish of Ab Lench was merged with Church Lench, on 18 December 2012 the merged parish was renamed from "Church Lench" to "South Lenches". In 1931 the parish of Church Lench (prior to the merge) had a population of 366.

There is still evidence of medieval furrows in the farmland surrounding the parish church.
