= Wychavon District Council elections =

Local government elections in Worcestershire, England

Wychavon District Council elections are held every four years. Wychavon District Council is the local authority for the non-metropolitan district of Wychavon in Worcestershire, England. Since the last boundary changes in 2023, 43 councillors have been elected from 27 wards.

== Council elections ==
Summary of the results of recent council elections, click on the year for full details of each election. Boundary changes took place for the 2003 election reducing the number of seats by four.

- 1973 Wychavon District Council election
- 1976 Wychavon District Council election
- 1979 Wychavon District Council election (New ward boundaries)
- 1983 Wychavon District Council election
- 1987 Wychavon District Council election (Some new ward boundaries & district boundary changes also took place)

| Year | Conservative | Liberal Democrats | UK Independence Party | Labour | Independent | Others | Green | Notes |
| 1991 | 27 | 10 | 0 | 6 | 6 | 0 | | |
| 1995 | 12 | 16 | 0 | 10 | 9 | 2 | | District boundary changes took place but the number of seats remained the same |
| 1999 | 29 | 11 | 0 | 5 | 4 | 0 | | |
| 2003 | 31 | 12 | 0 | 2 | 0 | 0 | | New ward boundaries |
| 2007 | 35 | 10 | 0 | 0 | 0 | 0 | | |
| 2011 | 39 | 5 | 0 | 1 | 0 | 0 | | |
| 2015 | 39 | 5 | 1 | 0 | 0 | 0 | | |
| 2019 | 36 | 6 | 0 | 0 | 1 | 0 | 2 | |
| 2023 | 29 | 7 | 0 | 1 | 0 | 0 | 6 | New ward boundaries |

== District result maps ==
2003 results map

2007 results map

2011 results map

2015 results map

2019 results map

2023 results map

== By-election results ==
By-elections occur when seats become vacant between council elections. Below is a summary of recent by-elections; full by-election results can be found by clicking on the by-election name.

| By-election | Date | Incumbent party | Winning party |
|---|---|---|---|
| Badsey | 6 June 1996 | Liberal Democrats | Liberal Democrats |
| Droitwich Spa West | 6 June 1996 | Labour | Labour |
| Evesham Hampton | 5 December 1996 | Independent | Conservative |
| Bretforton and Offerham | 1 May 1997 | Independent | Liberal Democrats |
| South Bredon Hill | 19 November 1998 | Independent | Liberal Democrats |
| Evesham East by-election | 9 November 2000 | Labour | Conservative |
| Dodderhill by-election | 16 May 2002 | Conservative | Conservative |
| Drakes Broughton by-election | 18 July 2002 | Liberal Democrats | Conservative |
| Lovett and North Claines by-election | 13 December 2007 | Conservative | Conservative |
| Droitwich Central by-election | 16 July 2009 | Liberal Democrats | Liberal Democrats |
| Droitwich South West by-election | 1 October 2009 | Conservative | Liberal Democrats |
| Evesham South by-election | 18 February 2010 | Conservative | Conservative |
| Fladbury by-election | 22 May 2014 | Conservative | Conservative |
| Droitwich East by-election | 30 July 2015 | Conservative | Conservative |
| Evesham South by-election | 4 May 2017 | Conservative | Conservative |
| Droitwich South East by-election | 4 May 2017 | Conservative | Conservative |
| Elmley Castle and Somerville by-election | 6 May 2021 | Conservative | Conservative |
| The Littletons by-election | 13 January 2022 | Conservative | Green |
| Dodderhill by-election | 11 August 2022 | Conservative | Conservative |
| Evesham South by-election | 10 August 2023 | Green | Green |
| Badsey and Aldington by-election | 29 August 2024 | Conservative | Conservative |
| Harvington and Norton by-election | 29 August 2024 | Conservative | Independent |
| Bretforton and Offenham by-election | 9 October 2025 | Conservative | Reform |
| Hartlebury by-election | 22 October 2026 | Conservative | Conservative |
