= Stoulton =

Village in Worcestershire, England

Coordinates: 52.146460°N 2.1409017°W

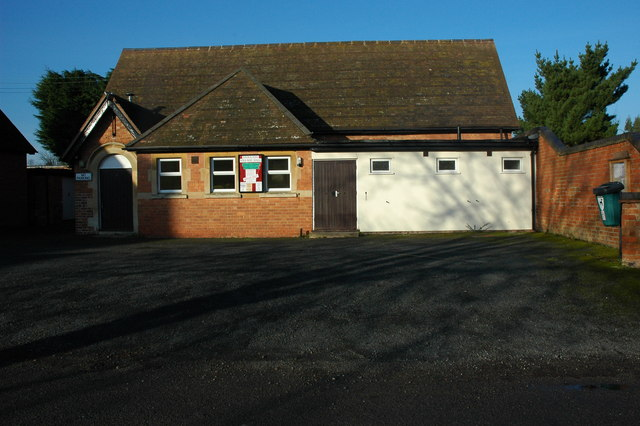
- village hall

- Location within Worcestershire
- Area: 7.9202 km^{2} (3.0580 sq mi)
- Population: 446 (2021)
  - Density: 56/km^{2} (150/sq mi)
- Civil parish: Stoulton
- District: Wychavon
- Shire county: Worcestershire
- Region: West Midlands
- Country: England
- Sovereign state: United Kingdom
- Post town: WORCESTER
- Postcode district: WR7
- Police: West Mercia
- Fire: Hereford and Worcester
- Ambulance: West Midlands
- UK Parliament: Droitwich and Evesham

Stoulton or Stoughton is a village and civil parish about 5 miles south west of Worcester, in the Wychavon district, in the county of Worcestershire, England. The parish includes the hamlet of Hawbridge. The civil parish population was 446 at the 2021 census. The parish touches Norton-juxta-Kempsey, Whittington, Peopleton, Drakes Broughton, Wadborough and White Ladies Aston. Many houses in the village date from the 17th century. Since 2010, the Anglican Mucknell Abbey has been in the parish.

== Features ==
There are 20 listed buildings in Stoulton. Stoulton railway station opened in 1854 and closed in 1966 although it was in the parish of Drakes Broughton and Wadborough. The village church, St Edmund's Church, dates to the 12th century. Upper Wolverton was a village in the parish that is thought to have been depopulated before 1550, the site currently has 2 farms. Lower Wolverton was possibly also a village in the parish.

== History ==
The name "Stoulton" means 'Stool farm/settlement'. Stoulton was recorded in the Domesday Book of 1086 as Stoltun. Stoulton was "Stoltun" in the 9th and 11th centuries, "Stulton" in the 15th century and "Stowton" in the 17th century. On 25 March 1885 Cookes Holme was transferred to the parish of Norton-juxta-Kempsey. The transferred area contained one house in 1891.

== Notable residents ==
- Scientist and cleric William Derham, the first man to accurately measure the speed of sound, was born in Stoulton in 1657
- Matthias Holst, half-brother of Gustav Holst, lived at Vicarage Cottage
