= Drakes Broughton and Wadborough =

Civil parish in Worcestershire, England

Coordinates: 52.1347°N 2.1084°W

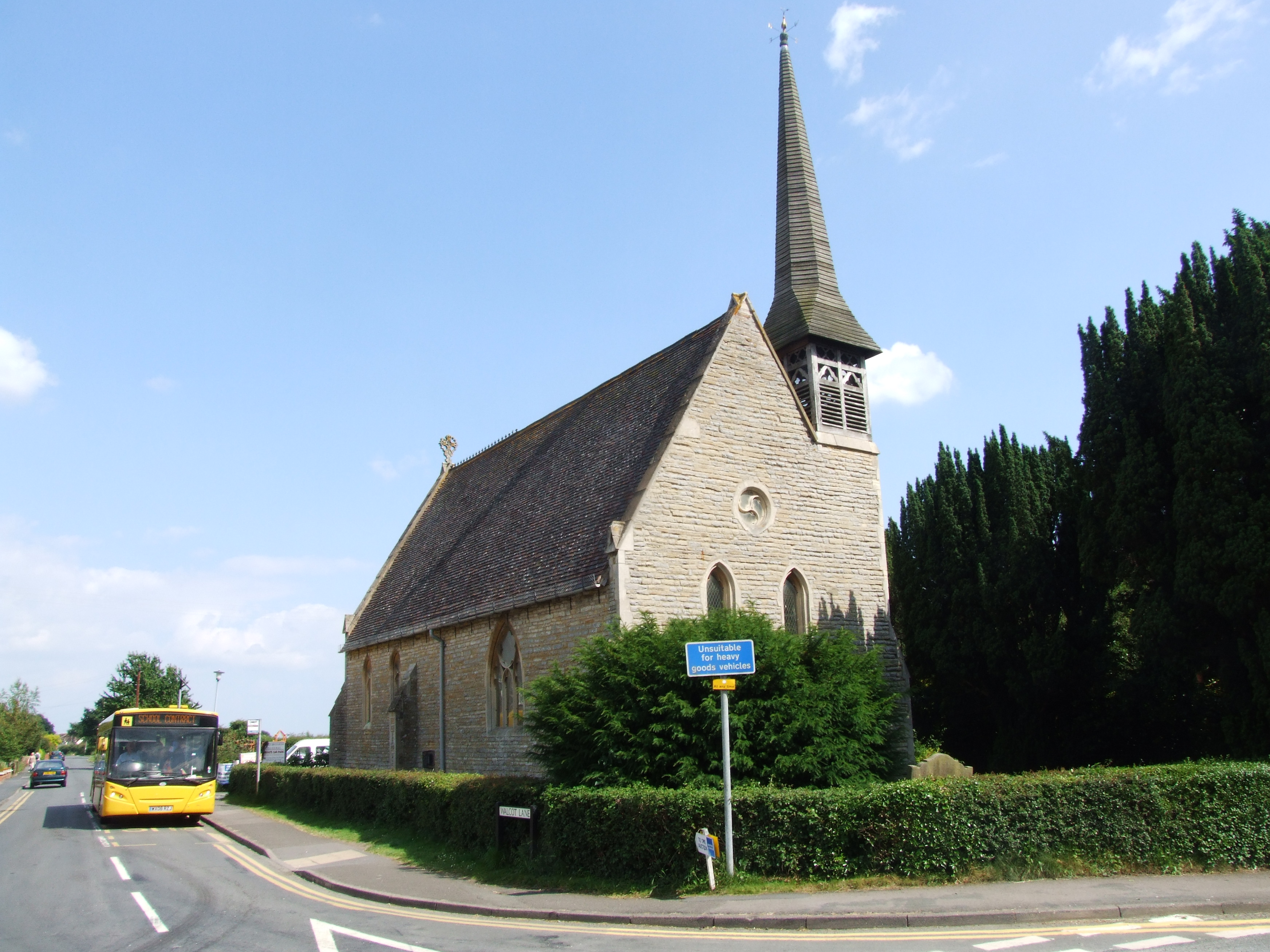
- St Barnabas' Church, Drakes Broughton in 2014

- Location within Worcestershire
- Population: 2,145 (2021)
- OS grid reference: SO924480
- Civil parish: Drakes Broughton and Wadborough
- District: Wychavon
- Shire county: Worcestershire
- Region: West Midlands
- Country: England
- Sovereign state: United Kingdom
- Post town: PERSHORE
- Postcode district: WR8 and 10
- Police: West Mercia
- Fire: Hereford and Worcester
- Ambulance: West Midlands
- UK Parliament: Droitwich and Evesham

Drakes Broughton and Wadborough is a civil parish in Wychavon district, Worcestershire, England, north-west of the town of Pershore. It includes the villages of Drakes Broughton and Wadborough. Its population was 2,145 in 2021.

== Geography ==
The parish has an area of around 13.51 square kilometres (5.2 square miles). It sits immediately north-west of the town of Pershore, and is about 2 miles south-east of the city of Worcester. The neighbouring villages include Pirton, Hawbridge and Peopleton.

== Politics ==
The parish falls within the Droitwich and Evesham parliament constituency, and is represented in the House of Commons by the Conservative Party MP, Nigel Huddleston. It also lies within the non-metropolitan district of Wychavon.

== Demographics ==
At the 2021 UK census, the parish population was recorded at 2,145. The White ethnic group comprised 98.2% of the population, whilst Christianity was the largest religion at 63.1%.
