= 2015 Wychavon District Council election =

2015 UK local government election

Map of the results of the 2015 Wychavon District Council election. Conservatives in blue, Liberal Democrats in yellow and UK Independence Party in purple.

The 2015 Wychavon District Council election took place on 7 May 2015 to elect members of Wychavon District Council in Worcestershire, England. The whole council was up for election and the Conservative Party stayed in overall control of the council.

== Background ==
After the 2011 elections to Wychavon District Council the Conservatives controlled the council with 39 councillors, while the Liberal Democrats had five seats and there was one Labour Party councillor. In March 2012 the Conservative councillor for Lovett and North Claines, Alan Fisher, was suspended from the council for 6 months and on his return sat as an independent councillor. Another change came in December 2013 when the councillor for Elmley Castle and Somerville, Roma Kirke, left the Conservatives to become an independent, before resigning from the council in December 2014. A further seat was vacant at the 2015 election in Badsey ward after the death of Conservative councillor Reg Jakeman, leaving the Conservatives with 36 seats, Liberal Democrats five, Labour one and there was one independent.

The 2015 election was the first time where parliamentary, district and parish elections were held at the same time in Wychavon since Wychavon District Council was founded in 1974. Over 100 candidates stood in the district election, up from 72 in 2011 and the number of contested wards increased from 21 to 28. Four Conservative candidates were elected unopposed in Bredon, Drakes Broughton, Honeybourne and Pebworth, and Norton and Whittington wards.

== Election result ==
The Conservatives retained control of the council after winning 39 seats, the same as in 2011, but up from immediately before the election. Labour lost their only seat on the council to the Conservatives in Droitwich West, after the Labour councillor Peter Pinfield stood down at the election, which meant the Conservatives won every seat in Droitwich.

The Liberal Democrats remained the largest opposition party on the council with five seats, after holding all of the seats they had been defending. The only other councillor elected was Ged Bearcroft for the UK Independence Party in Great Hampton ward. He defeated the Conservative councillor for the previous 32 years, John Smith, by 17 votes after a recount, to win the first ever UK Independence Party seat on Wychavon District Council. Overall turnout at the election was 70.19%, up from 47% in 2011 and 42% in 2007, and reaching 81.78% in Bowbrook.

Following the election the Conservative leader of the council, Paul Middlebrough, stepped down as leader after eight years and was succeeded by Linda Robinson.

Wychavon local election result 2015
Party	Seats	Gains	Losses	Net gain/loss	Seats %	Votes %	Votes	+/−
Conservative	39	3	1	+2	86.7	58.2	49,387	-0.6
Liberal Democrats	5	0	0	0	11.1	14.5	12,283	-7.6
UKIP	1	1	0	+1	2.2	9.3	7,898	+9.3
Green	0	0	0	0	0.0	7.5	6,397	+5.5
Labour	0	0	1	-1	0.0	6.0	5,081	-4.4
Independent	0	0	2	-2	0.0	4.1	3,493	-2.6
Monster Raving Loony	0	0	0	0	0.0	0.4	326	+0.4

== Ward results ==
Badsey
Party	Candidate	Votes	%	±%
Conservative	Mark Goodge	681	44.4	−6.8
Independent	Mary Campbell	574	37.4	−11.4
UKIP	Anthony Haugh	279	18.2	+18.2
Majority		107	7.0	+4.6
Turnout		1,534	68.7	+23.8
Conservative hold		Swing		

Bengeworth (2 seats)
Party	Candidate	Votes	%	±%
Conservative	Martin King	1,385		
Conservative	Emma Stokes	1,199		
UKIP	Jeremy Farrow	986		
Green	Christopher Wilson	687		
Turnout		4,257	61.7	+22.3
Conservative hold		Swing		
Conservative hold		Swing		

Bowbrook
Party	Candidate	Votes	%	±%
Liberal Democrats	Alexandra Rowley	1,109	55.9	−3.6
Conservative	Sydney Bates	874	44.1	+3.6
Majority		235	11.9	−7.1
Turnout		1,983	81.8	+23.8
Liberal Democrats hold		Swing		

Bredon
Party	Candidate	Votes	%	±%
Conservative	Adrian Hardman	unopposed		
Conservative hold		Swing		

Bretforton and Offenham
Party	Candidate	Votes	%	±%
Liberal Democrats	Keith Wright	840	56.2	+2.8
Conservative	David Ernest	655	43.8	−2.8
Majority		185	12.4	+5.6
Turnout		1,495	69.1	+19.1
Liberal Democrats hold		Swing		

Broadway and Wickhamford (2 seats)
Party	Candidate	Votes	%	±%
Conservative	Elizabeth Eyre	2,048		
Conservative	Bradley Thomas	1,533		
Green	Liam Wilson	684		
Monster Raving Loony	Paul Brockman	326		
Turnout		4,591	73.3	
Conservative hold		Swing		
Conservative hold		Swing		

Dodderhill
Party	Candidate	Votes	%	±%
Conservative	Hugh Hamilton	902	67.0	−5.8
Liberal Democrats	Peter Evans	445	33.0	+5.8
Majority		457	33.9	−11.6
Turnout		1,347	67.7	+28.6
Conservative hold		Swing		

Drakes Broughton
Party	Candidate	Votes	%	±%
Conservative	Paul Middlebrough	unopposed		
Conservative hold		Swing		

Droitwich Central
Party	Candidate	Votes	%	±%
Conservative	Roy Murphy	486	37.8	−5.6
Labour	Alan Humphries	347	27.0	−7.9
UKIP	Neil Whelan	323	25.1	+25.1
Liberal Democrats	Rebecca Littlechild	130	10.1	−11.6
Majority		139	10.8	+2.3
Turnout		1,286	65.4	+23.4
Conservative hold		Swing		

Droitwich East (2 seats)
Party	Candidate	Votes	%	±%
Conservative	Gordon Brookes	1,587		
Conservative	Glenise Noyes	1,201		
Labour	Sheila Neary	775		
UKIP	Andrew Morgan	724		
Liberal Democrats	David Rowe	534		
Turnout		4,821	69.7	+25.0
Conservative hold		Swing		
Conservative hold		Swing		

Droitwich South East (2 seats)
Party	Candidate	Votes	%	±%
Conservative	Richard Morris	1,950		
Conservative	Maureen Lawley	1,663		
UKIP	Charlotte Townsend	613		
Labour	Stephen Ainsworth	494		
Liberal Democrats	Robert Crawford	455		
Green	Robert Burkett	296		
Liberal Democrats	Adrian Key	287		
Turnout		5,758	78.9	+27.1
Conservative hold		Swing		
Conservative hold		Swing		

Droitwich South West (2 seats)
Party	Candidate	Votes	%	±%
Conservative	Robert Beale	1,208		
Conservative	Thomas Noyes	1,131		
UKIP	Yuleen Jewell	641		
Labour	Bill Baker	602		
Liberal Democrats	Wendy Carter	432		
Green	Jane Zurek	301		
Liberal Democrats	John Littlechild	231		
Turnout		4,546	70.4	+24.6
Conservative hold		Swing		
Conservative hold		Swing		

Droitwich West (2 seats)
Party	Candidate	Votes	%	±%
Conservative	Janet Bolton	983		
Conservative	Catherine Powell	897		
Labour	Eve Freer	829		
Labour	Jacqueline O'Reilly	604		
Green	Ann Bennett	381		
Turnout		3,694	56.5	+22.3
Conservative hold		Swing		
Conservative gain from Labour		Swing		

Eckington
Party	Candidate	Votes	%	±%
Conservative	Ronald Davis	1,177	69.4	+5.9
Labour	Priscilla Cameron	518	30.6	+16.7
Majority		659	38.9	−2.0
Turnout		1,695	76.2	+16.2
Conservative hold		Swing		

Elmley Castle and Somerville
Party	Candidate	Votes	%	±%
Conservative	George Mackison	1,013	67.3	−1.5
Green	Daniel Mulligan	492	32.7	+32.7
Majority		521	34.6	−3.1
Turnout		1,505	76.6	+44.0
Conservative gain from Independent		Swing		

Evesham North (2 seats)
Party	Candidate	Votes	%	±%
Conservative	Robert Raphael	908		
Conservative	Josephine Sandalls	774		
UKIP	Richard Keel	702		
Green	Colin Tether	616		
Liberal Democrats	Timothy Haines	456		
Turnout		3,456	60.7	+26.4
Conservative hold		Swing		
Conservative hold		Swing		

Evesham South (2 seats)
Party	Candidate	Votes	%	±%
Conservative	James Bulman	1,368		
Conservative	Kenneth Barclay-Timmis	1,271		
Green	Edward Cohen	903		
Turnout		3,542	61.3	
Conservative hold		Swing		
Conservative hold		Swing		

Fladbury
Party	Candidate	Votes	%	±%
Conservative	Michelle English	1,061	62.9	−14.8
Liberal Democrats	Diana Brown	338	20.0	−2.3
Green	Julian Eldridge	289	17.1	+17.1
Majority		723	42.8	−12.7
Turnout		1,688	77.4	+11.2
Conservative hold		Swing		

Great Hampton
Party	Candidate	Votes	%	±%
UKIP	Gerald Bearcroft	624	43.6	
Conservative	John Smith	607	42.4	
Green	Michael Parker	201	14.0	
Majority		17	1.2	
Turnout		1,432	66.8	
UKIP gain from Conservative		Swing		

Hartlebury
Party	Candidate	Votes	%	±%
Conservative	Nigel Dowty	943	59.3	
Independent	Sheridan Tranter	439	27.6	
Liberal Democrats	Andrew Murcott	208	13.1	
Majority		504	31.7	
Turnout		1,590	73.7	
Conservative hold		Swing		

Harvington and Norton
Party	Candidate	Votes	%	±%
Conservative	Charles Homer	1,103	73.6	
Green	Sarah Cohen	395	26.4	
Majority		708	47.2	
Turnout		1,498	74.2	
Conservative hold		Swing		

Honeybourne and Pebworth
Party	Candidate	Votes	%	±%
Conservative	Alastair Adams	unopposed		
Conservative hold		Swing		

Inkberrow (2 seats)
Party	Candidate	Votes	%	±%
Conservative	Audrey Steel	2,248		
Conservative	David Wilkinson	1,778		
Independent	David Powis	958		
UKIP	Clive Owen	716		
UKIP	Peter Jewell	548		
Turnout		6,248	78.9	+21.8
Conservative hold		Swing		
Conservative hold		Swing		

Little Hampton (2 seats)
Party	Candidate	Votes	%	±%
Conservative	Gerard O'Donnell	1,223		
Conservative	Frances Smith	1,030		
UKIP	Peter Long	808		
Green	Jonathan Thompson	534		
Turnout		3,595	60.1	+25.5
Conservative hold		Swing		
Conservative hold		Swing		

Lovett and North Claines (2 seats)
Party	Candidate	Votes	%	±%
Conservative	Anthony Miller	2,109		
Conservative	Lynne Duffy	1,846		
Liberal Democrats	Roy Roberson	826		
Independent	Nigel Addison	739		
Turnout		5,520	76.3	+27.1
Conservative hold		Swing		
Conservative gain from Independent		Swing		

Norton and Whittington
Party	Candidate	Votes	%	±%
Conservative	Robert Adams	unopposed		
Conservative hold		Swing		

Ombersley
Party	Candidate	Votes	%	±%
Conservative	Peter Tomlinson	1,058	76.3	
Liberal Democrats	Judith Cussen	329	23.7	
Majority		729	52.6	
Turnout		1,387	72.7	
Conservative hold		Swing		

Pershore (3 seats)
Party	Candidate	Votes	%	±%
Liberal Democrats	Charles Tucker	1,598		
Conservative	Michael Rowley	1,419		
Conservative	Valerie Wood	1,315		
Conservative	David Smith	1,226		
Liberal Democrats	Carolyn Harford	1,035		
UKIP	Jonathan Townsend	934		
Liberal Democrats	Derrick Watt	858		
Independent	David Annis	783		
Labour	Peter Brookbank	771		
Turnout		9,939	66.8	+17.3
Liberal Democrats hold		Swing		
Conservative hold		Swing		
Conservative hold		Swing		

Pinvin
Party	Candidate	Votes	%	±%
Liberal Democrats	Elizabeth Tucker	1,129	65.0	−5.9
Conservative	Clive Brooker	608	35.0	+5.9
Majority		521	30.0	−11.8
Turnout		1,737	74.8	+19.4
Liberal Democrats hold		Swing		

South Bredon Hill
Party	Candidate	Votes	%	±%
Liberal Democrats	Adrian Darby	671	46.6	
Conservative	Beverley Hardman	628	43.6	
Labour	Robert Facer	141	9.8	
Majority		43	3.0	
Turnout		1,440	76.4	
Liberal Democrats hold		Swing		

The Littletons
Party	Candidate	Votes	%	±%
Conservative	Richard Lasota	951	60.6	+5.5
Green	Innes Barnes	618	39.4	+39.4
Majority		333	21.2	+10.9
Turnout		1,569	72.3	+20.0
Conservative hold		Swing		

Upton Snodsbury
Party	Candidate	Votes	%	±%
Conservative	Linda Robinson	1,340	78.3	
Liberal Democrats	Gregory Thomas	372	21.7	
Majority		968	56.6	
Turnout		1,712	78.6	
Conservative hold		Swing		

== By-elections between 2015 and 2019 ==
A by-election was held in Droitwich East on 30 July 2015 after the death of Conservative councillor Glenise Noyes. The seat was held for the Conservatives by Karen Tomalin with a majority of the 320 votes over Labour Party candidate Jacqueline O'Reilly.

Droitwich East by-election 30 July 2015
Party	Candidate	Votes	%	±%
Conservative	Karen Tomalin	495	52.2	+8.3
Labour	Jacqueline O'Reilly	175	18.4	−3.0
UKIP	Andrew Morgan	171	18.0	−2.0
Liberal Democrats	Rory Roberson	108	11.4	−3.4
Majority		320	33.8	
Turnout		949	22.1	−47.6
Conservative hold		Swing		

Two by-elections were held on 4 May 2017.

A by-election was held in Evesham South after the retirement of Ken Barclay on health grounds. The seat was held for the Conservatives by Matt Snape with a majority of 351 votes over the Liberal Democrat candidate Julie Haines.

Evesham South by-election 2017
Party	Candidate	Votes	%	±%
Conservative	Matt Snape	538	51.2	+15.4
Liberal Democrats	Julie Haines	187	17.8	New
Green	Julie Tucker	171	16.2	−9.2
Independent	Emma Nishigaki	154	14.6	New
Majority		351	33.4	
Turnout		1,050		
Conservative hold		Swing		

A by-election was held in Droitwich South East following the death of Maureen Lawley. The seat was held for the Conservatives by Sital Harris with a majority of 903 votes over the Liberal Democrat candidate Adrian Key.

Droitwich South East by-election 2017
Party	Candidate	Votes	%	±%
Conservative	Sital Harris	1161	66.6	
Liberal Democrats	Adrian Key	258	14.8	
Labour	Valerie Patricia Rose Humphries	216	12.4	
Green	Jane Delia Zurek	96	5.5	
Majority		351	51.8	
Turnout		1,050		
Conservative hold		Swing		
