= Norton railway station =

Norton railway station can refer to:

- Norton railway station (Cheshire), a former station in Norton, Cheshire, England
- Norton railway station (South Yorkshire), a former station in Norton, South Yorkshire, England
- Norton Halt railway station, a former Oxford, Worcester and Wolverhampton Railway station in Norton, Worcestershire, England
