= Defford railway station =

Former railway station in Worcestershire, England

Defford

General information
- Location: Defford, Worcestershire; England
- Coordinates: 52.0842°N 2.1243°W
- Grid reference: SO915428
- Platforms: 2

Other information
- Status: Disused

History
- Original company: Birmingham and Gloucester Railway
- Pre-grouping: Midland Railway
- Post-grouping: London, Midland and Scottish Railway

Key dates
- 24 June 1840: Opened
- 1965: Closed
Location

Defford railway station was a station in Defford, Worcestershire, England. The station was opened in 1840 and closed in 1965.

Preceding station	Disused railways	Following station
Eckington	Birmingham and Gloucester Railway	Besford
