= Wadborough railway station =

Former railway station in Worcestershire, England

Wadborough
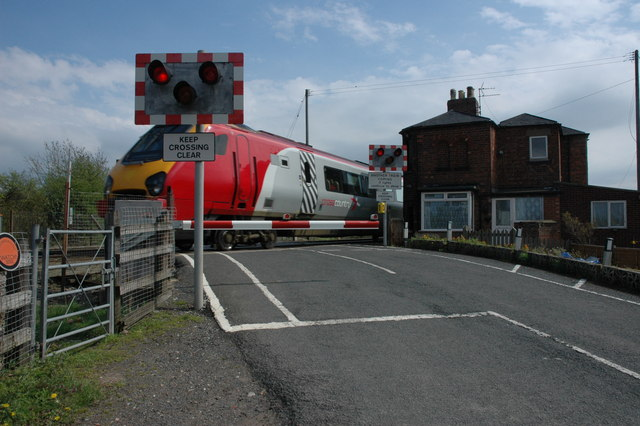
- Station house shown to the right of the level crossing.

General information
- Location: Wadborough, Worcestershire; England
- Coordinates: 52.1299°N 2.1559°W
- Grid reference: SO893480
- Platforms: 2

Other information
- Status: Disused

History
- Original company: Birmingham and Gloucester Railway
- Pre-grouping: Midland Railway

Key dates
- 15 November 1841: Opened
- January 1965: Closed
Location

Wadborough railway station was located in Wadborough, Worcestershire. It opened in 1841 and closed in January 1965. It was situated to the west on the Bristol to Birmingham rail line; the line remains open and high-speed trains regularly pass through the level crossing called Wadborough. As of July 2015 the crossing now has LED lights.

Preceding station	Disused railways	Following station
Pirton	Birmingham and Gloucester Railway	Abbots Wood Junction
