= William Derham =

English clergyman and scientist (1657–1735)

Rev. William Derham FRS
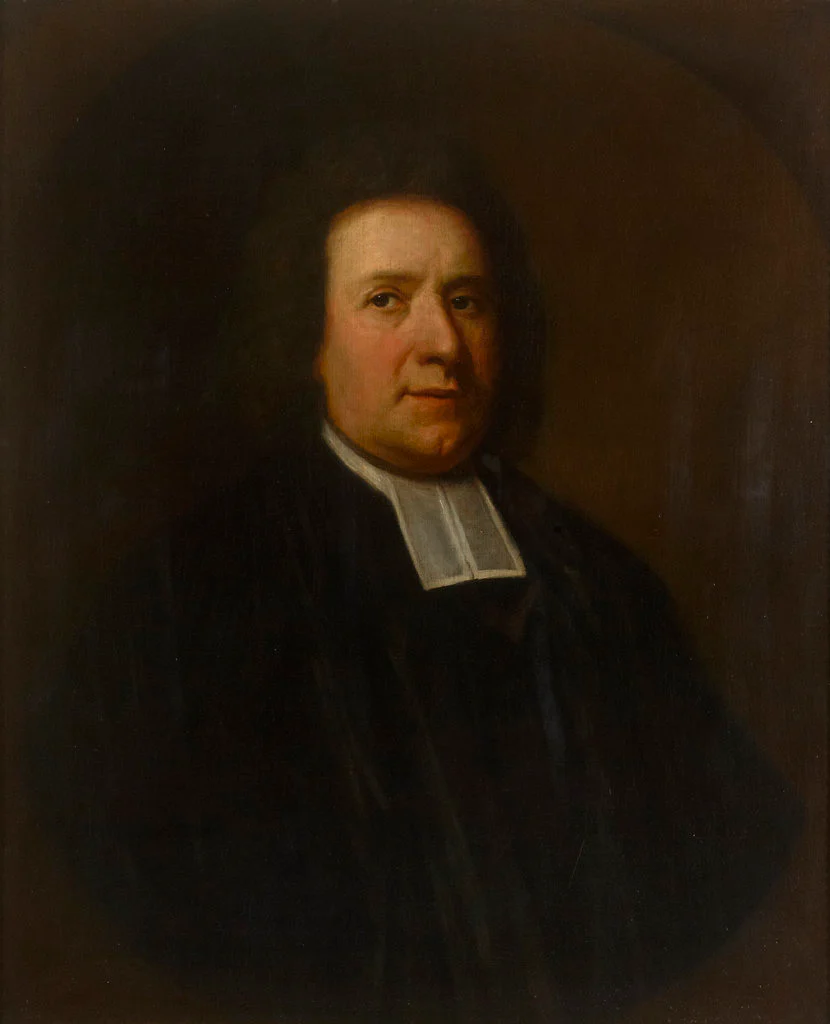
- Portrait, 18th century
- Born: 26 November 1657; Stoulton, Worcestershire, England
- Died: 5 April 1735 (aged 77); Upminster, Essex, England
- Education: Trinity College, Oxford
- Known for: Natural theology; Measurement of the speed of sound
- Awards: Fellow of the Royal Society
- Scientific career
- Fields: Physico-Theology

William Derham FRS (26 November 1657 – 5 April 1735) was an English clergyman, natural theologian, natural philosopher and scientist. He produced the earliest reasonably accurate measurement of the speed of sound.

== Life ==
William Derham was the son of Thomas Derham. He was born at Stoulton, in Worcestershire, England. He was educated at Blockley, Gloucestershire, and at Trinity College, Oxford, from 1675 to 1679. He was ordained on 29 May 1681. In 1682, he became vicar of Wargrave, Berkshire, and from 1689 to 1735 he was Rector at Upminster, Essex. While at Upminster, in 1716 he became a Canon of Windsor and the vestry minutes show that thereafter he divided his time between those two places. The parish registers of Upminster record his burial at St. Laurence's in 1735. However, the precise site of his grave is unknown and, in accordance with his wishes, there is no memorial to him in the church.

== Work ==
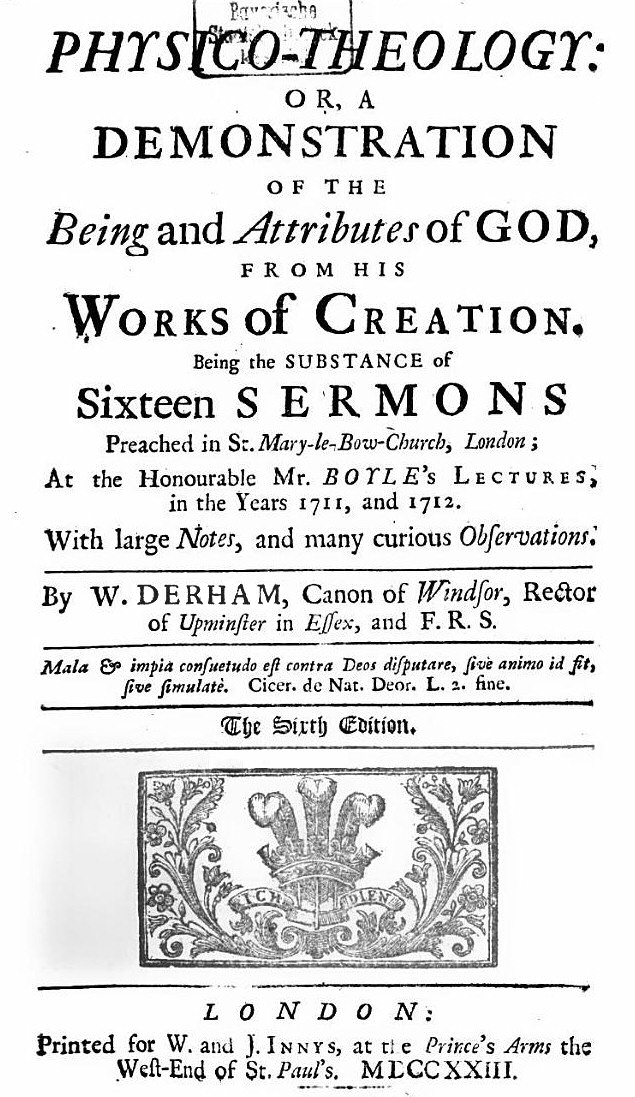
Title page of 1723 edition of Derham's Physico-Theology

In 1696, he published his Artificial Clockmaker, which went through several editions. The best known of his subsequent works are Physico-Theology, published in 1713; Astro-Theology, 1714; and Christo-Theology, 1730. All three of these books are teleological arguments for the being and attributes of God, and were used by William Paley nearly a century later. However, these books also include quantities of original scientific observations. For example, Physico-Theology contains his recognition of natural variation within species and that he knew that Didelphis virginialis (the Virginia opossum) was the only marsupial in North America. It also includes one of the earliest theoretical descriptions of a marine chronometer, accompanied by a discussion of the use of vacuum seals to reduce inaccuracies in the operation of timepieces. He is the first person known to have used the word chronometer.

Similarly, Astro-Theology includes several newly identified nebulae (this was the name used at the time for all extended astronomical objects: some of his nebulae are what we would now call star clusters). His 16-foot-long (4.9 m) telescope (also used when measuring the velocity of sound) was at the top of the tower of St Laurence's Church, where the necessary doors are still in place.

On 3 February 1703, Derham was elected Fellow of the Royal Society. He was Boyle lecturer in 1711–1712. His last known work, entitled A Defence of the Church's Right in Leasehold Estates, appeared as early as 1731.

But besides the works published in his own name, Derham contributed a variety of papers to the Transactions of the Royal Society. He revised the Miscellanea Curiosa. He edited the correspondence and wrote a biography of John Ray, whose 'physico-theology' (natural theology) tradition he continued, making him an early parson-naturalist.

He edited Eleazar Albin's Natural History, and published some of the manuscripts of the scientist Robert Hooke. His meteorological observations at Upminster (in the Transactions of the Royal Society) are amongst the earliest series in England.

=== Speed of sound ===
In 1709 Derham published a more accurate measure of the speed of sound, at 1,072 Parisian feet per second. Derham used a telescope from the tower of the church of St Laurence, Upminster, to observe the flash of a distant shotgun being fired, and then measured the time until he heard the gunshot with a half second pendulum. Measurements were made of gunshots from local landmarks including the Church of St Mary Magdalene, North Ockendon. The distance was known by triangulation, and thus the speed that the sound had travelled could be calculated.

== Tribute ==
Dr Derham was of small stature and distorted frame. He was not only the moral and religious benefactor of his parishioners, and of all those who came in his way, but he was likewise the physician of their bodies, and their pecuniary friend in all their difficulties. He lived beloved, and died lamented, at his rectory, in 1735 …

== Works ==
- The Artificial Clockmaker (1696)
  - --- (1734 edition)
- Physico-theology, or a Demonstration of the Being and Attributes of God (1723 edition)
- Christo-Theology: Or, a Demonstration of the Divine Authority of the Christian Religion (1730 edition)
- A defence of the churches right in leasehold estate, London: W. Innys 1731.
- Astro-theology: or, A demonstration of the being and attributes of God, from a Survey of the Heavens (1731 edition)

== See also ==
- Astrotheology
