= Stoulton railway station =

Former railway station in Worcestershire, England

Stoulton
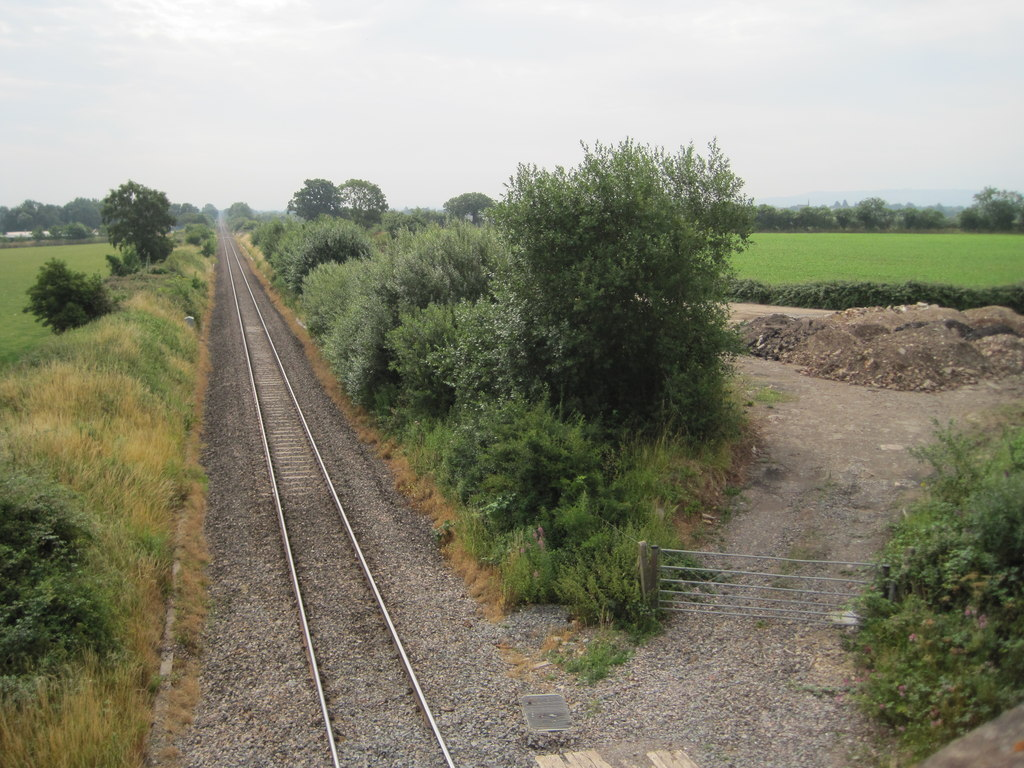
- The site of the station in 2013

General information
- Location: Northwest of Drakes Broughton, Worcestershire; England
- Coordinates: 52.1459°N 2.1180°W
- Grid reference: SO920497
- Platforms: 2

Other information
- Status: Disused

History
- Original company: Great Western Railway
- Pre-grouping: Great Western Railway
- Post-grouping: Great Western Railway

Key dates
- 20 February 1899: Opened
- 3 January 1966: Closed
Location

Stoulton railway station was a station to the northwest of Drakes Broughton, Worcestershire, England. The station was opened in 1899 and closed in 1966.

| Preceding station | Disused railways | Following station |
|---|---|---|
| Norton Halt; Line open, station closed | Great Western Railway; Oxford, Worcester and Wolverhampton Railway | Pershore; Line and station open |
