= Besford railway station =

Disused railway station in Besford, Worcestershire

Coordinates: 52.104°N 2.140°W

Besford

General information
- Location: Besford, Worcestershire; England
- Platforms: 2

Other information
- Status: Disused

History
- Original company: Birmingham and Gloucester Railway

Key dates
- November 1841: Opened
- August 1846: Closed
Location

Besford railway station served the village of Besford, Worcestershire, England, from 1841 to 1846 on the Birmingham and Gloucester Railway.

== History ==
The station was opened in November 1841 by the Birmingham and Gloucester Railway. It was listed late in the timetable, appearing on 19 May 1842. It closed in August 1846.

Preceding station	Disused railways	Following station
Defford	Birmingham and Gloucester Railway	Pirton
