= Pirton railway station =

Short-lived railway station in Pirton, Worcestershire

Pirton

General information
- Location: Pirton, Worcestershire; England
- Coordinates: 52.1212°N 2.1517°W
- Grid reference: SO897469

Other information
- Status: Disused

History
- Original company: Birmingham and Gloucester Railway

Key dates
- 15 November 1841: Opened
- 4 November 1844: Closed
Location

Pirton railway station, also known as Kempsey railway station, served the village of Pirton, Worcestershire, England, from 1841 to 1844 on the Birmingham and Gloucester Railway.

== History ==
The station was opened on 15 November 1841 by the Birmingham and Gloucester Railway. It was a short-lived station, closing on 4 November 1844.

Preceding station	Disused railways	Following station
Besford	Birmingham and Gloucester Railway	Wadborough
