= 2023 Wychavon District Council election =

2023 English local election

- 4 May 2023

All 43 seats to Wychavon District Council 22 seats needed for a majority
- Turnout: 32.5%

	First party	Second party	Third party
Leader	Bradley Thomas	Margaret Rowley	Julie Tucker
Party	Conservative	Liberal Democrats	Green
Last election	36 seats, 53.5%	6 seats, 25.7%	2 seats, 8.2%
Seats before	35	6	3
Seats won	29	7	6
Seat change	▼7	▲1	▲4
Popular vote	25,678	14,146	7,465
Percentage	46.6%	25.7%	13.6%
Swing	▼6.9%	0.0%	▲5.4%
	Fourth party	Fifth party
Party	Labour	Independent
Last election	0 seats, 6.1%	1 seat, 6.1%
Seats before	0	1
Seats won	1	0
Seat change	▲1	▼1
Popular vote	4,641	2,898
Percentage	8.4%	5.3%
Swing	▲2.3%	▼0.8%
- Winner of each seat at the 2023 Wychavon District Council election
Leader before election
Bradley Thomas
Conservative
Leader after election
Bradley Thomas
Conservative

The 2023 Wychavon District Council election took place on 4 May 2023 to elect members of Wychavon District Council in Worcestershire, England. This was on the same day as other local elections. New ward boundaries came into effect for this election, decreasing the number of seats from 45 to 43.

The Conservatives lost seats, but retained their majority on the council.

== Summary ==
=== Election result ===
2023 Wychavon District Council election
Party	Candidates	Seats	Gains	Losses	Net gain/loss	Seats %	Votes %	Votes	+/−
Conservative	43	29	0	4	▼7	67.4	46.6	25,678	–6.9
Liberal Democrats	26	7	1	0	▲1	16.3	25.7	14,146	±0.0
Green	15	6	2	0	▲4	14.0	13.6	7,465	+5.4
Labour	13	1	1	0	▲1	2.3	8.4	4,641	+2.3
Independent	12	0	0	0	▼1	0.0	5.3	2,898	–0.8
Reform	2	0	0	0	Steady	0.0	0.4	228	N/A

== Ward results ==
The results for each ward were as follows:

=== Badsey & Aldington ===
Badsey & Aldington
Party	Candidate	Votes	%	±%
Conservative	Philippa Capel	372	56.2	N/A
Labour	Mary Campbell	290	43.8	N/A
Majority		82	12.4	N/A
Turnout		669	28.4	N/A
Registered electors		2,360		
Conservative win (new seat)				

=== Bengeworth ===
Bengeworth (2 seats)
Party	Candidate	Votes	%	±%
Conservative	Emma Stokes*	441	38.6	–9.9
Conservative	Mark Goodge	433	37.9	–12.0
Green	Stephen Squires	348	30.5	N/A
Green	Linda Tucker	341	29.9	N/A
Independent	Julie Haines	286	25.0	N/A
Independent	Callum Gailey	266	23.3	N/A
Turnout		1,142	23.6	–1.5
Registered electors		4,831		
Conservative hold				
Conservative hold				

=== Bowbrook ===
Bowbrook
Party	Candidate	Votes	%	±%
Liberal Democrats	Margaret Rowley*	644	65.5	+1.1
Conservative	Tony Rowley	339	34.5	–1.1
Majority		305	31.0	
Turnout		993	41.7	+1.4
Registered electors		2,382		
Liberal Democrats hold		Swing	▲1.1	

=== Bredon Hill ===
Bredon Hill
Party	Candidate	Votes	%	±%
Conservative	Beverley Hardman	537	59.4	N/A
Liberal Democrats	Derrick Watt	367	40.6	N/A
Majority		170	18.8	N/A
Turnout		910	38.2	N/A
Registered electors		2,380		
Conservative win (new seat)				

=== Bredon ===
Bredon
Party	Candidate	Votes	%	±%
Conservative	Adrian Hardman*	647	61.2	–17.5
Liberal Democrats	Michael Doley	251	23.7	N/A
Green	Martin Everett	159	15.0	N/A
Majority		396	37.5	N/A
Turnout		1,063	39.6	+3.0
Registered electors		2,683		
Conservative hold		Swing	N/A	

=== Bretforton & Offenham ===
Bretforton & Offenham
Party	Candidate	Votes	%	±%
Conservative	Aaron Powell*	397	55.5	N/A
Labour	Matthew Rea	214	29.9	N/A
Liberal Democrats	Christopher Ounsted	104	14.5	N/A
Majority		183	25.6	N/A
Turnout		721	31.7	N/A
Registered electors		2,274		
Conservative hold		Swing	N/A	

=== Broadway, Sedgeberrow & Childswickham ===
Broadway, Sedgeberrow & Childswickham (2 seats)
Party	Candidate	Votes	%	±%
Conservative	Emma Kearsey	1,102	58.6	N/A
Conservative	Emma Sims	1,072	57.0	N/A
Liberal Democrats	Alison Cort	561	29.8	N/A
Liberal Democrats	Anne Lord	518	27.5	N/A
Reform	Phil Harmer	143	7.6	N/A
Turnout		1,882	35.9	N/A
Registered electors		5,244		
Conservative win (new seat)				
Conservative win (new seat)				

=== Dodderhill ===
Dodderhill
Party	Candidate	Votes	%	±%
Conservative	Rick Deller	472	59.5	N/A
Green	Sue Howarth	321	40.5	N/A
Majority		151	19.0	N/A
Turnout		798	29.7	N/A
Registered electors		2,687		
Conservative hold				

=== Drakes Broughton, Norton & Whittington ===
Drakes Broughton, Norton & Whittington (2 seats)
Party	Candidate	Votes	%	±%
Liberal Democrats	Liz Turier*	800	51.3	N/A
Conservative	Rob Adams*	776	49.8	N/A
Liberal Democrats	Tom Revell	765	49.1	N/A
Conservative	Mark Ward*	617	39.6	N/A
Turnout		1,559	30.9	N/A
Registered electors		5,047		
Liberal Democrats win (new seat)				
Conservative win (new seat)				

=== Droitwich East ===
Droitwich East (2 seats)
Party	Candidate	Votes	%	±%
Green	Neil Franks	944	61.7	N/A
Green	Nicola Morris	813	53.1	N/A
Conservative	Kate Fellows	558	36.5	–21.0
Conservative	Alex Sinton*	507	33.1	–32.1
Reform	Warwick Bambrook	85	5.6	N/A
Turnout		1,530	35.2	+3.8
Registered electors		4,353		
Green gain from Conservative				
Green gain from Conservative				

=== Droitwich South East ===
Droitwich South East (2 seats)
Party	Candidate	Votes	%	±%
Conservative	Richard Morris*	1,102	64.3	–4.6
Conservative	John Grady*	904	52.7	–2.4
Liberal Democrats	Wendy Carter	634	37.0	N/A
Liberal Democrats	John Littlechild	543	31.7	+13.9
Turnout		1,714	31.8	–4.0
Registered electors		5,383		
Conservative hold				
Conservative hold				

=== Droitwich South West ===
Droitwich South West (2 seats)
Party	Candidate	Votes	%	±%
Conservative	Eric Bowden*	828	53.8	+1.2
Conservative	Gregory Wilkins	616	40.0	–7.5
Labour	Alan Humphries	485	31.5	N/A
Liberal Democrats	Adrian Key	461	30.0	–10.7
Labour	Alex Knudsen	379	24.6	N/A
Turnout		1,539	29.8	–3.8
Registered electors		5,163		
Conservative hold				
Conservative hold				

=== Droitwich West ===
Droitwich West (2 seats)
Party	Candidate	Votes	%	±%
Conservative	George Duffy*	422	40.1	–7.3
Conservative	Jenny Chaudry*	378	35.9	–4.5
Labour	Valerie Humphries	348	33.0	+0.9
Labour	Anthony Kelly	327	31.1	+4.7
Liberal Democrats	Rod Hopkins	266	25.3	–5.3
Liberal Democrats	Paul Wiseman	216	20.5	N/A
Turnout		1,053	24.9	+2.6
Registered electors		4,226		
Conservative hold				
Conservative hold				

=== Eckington ===
Eckington
Party	Candidate	Votes	%	±%
Conservative	Paul Middlebrough	370	34.3	N/A
Independent	Tim Knight	355	32.9	N/A
Liberal Democrats	Pauline Newcombe	261	24.2	N/A
Green	Mike Le Brun	92	8.5	N/A
Majority		15	1.4	N/A
Turnout		1,080	45.7	N/A
Registered electors		2,362		
Conservative hold				

=== Evesham North ===
Evesham North (2 seats)
Party	Candidate	Votes	%	±%
Conservative	Charlie Homer	401	33.7	–6.2
Labour	Mary Tasker	376	31.6	+5.7
Conservative	Nick Taylor	353	29.7	–8.4
Labour	David Tasker	325	27.3	N/A
Independent	Tim Haines	279	23.5	N/A
Independent	Emma Nishigaki	252	21.2	–12.7
Liberal Democrats	Diane Colvin	162	13.6	N/A
Independent	Sam Bastow	68	5.7	N/A
Turnout		1,189	27.0	–2.9
Registered electors		4,404		
Conservative hold				
Labour gain from Conservative				

=== Evesham South ===
Evesham South (2 seats)
Party	Candidate	Votes	%	±%
Green	Julie Tucker*	623	55.9	–1.8
Green	Ed Cohen*	511	45.9	+11.0
Conservative	Stan Brotherton	303	27.2	–2.9
Conservative	Paul Bennett	298	26.8	–4.3
Independent	Kyle Hotchkins	186	16.7	N/A
Independent	Joe Caine	154	13.8	N/A
Turnout		1,114	25.2	–3.4
Registered electors		4,420		
Green hold				
Green hold				

=== Fladbury ===
Fladbury
Party	Candidate	Votes	%	±%
Liberal Democrats	Angie Crump	518	53.7	+17.7
Conservative	Matthew Winfield	446	46.3	–17.7
Majority		72	7.4	N/A
Turnout		971	43.1	+6.9
Registered electors		2,254		
Liberal Democrats gain from Conservative		Swing	▲17.7	

=== Hampton ===
Hampton (3 seats)
Party	Candidate	Votes	%	±%
Conservative	Andrew Dyke*	688	41.3	N/A
Conservative	Robert Raphael*	660	39.6	N/A
Conservative	John Clatworthy	619	37.2	N/A
Labour	Brian Gregory	434	26.1	N/A
Labour	Heather Kelleher	433	26.0	N/A
Independent	Peter Scurfield	349	21.0	N/A
Independent	Terri Gailey	336	20.2	N/A
Independent	Ann Lyon	318	19.1	N/A
Liberal Democrats	Diana Brown	292	17.5	N/A
Liberal Democrats	David Quayle	251	15.1	N/A
Turnout		1,665	25.1	N/A
Registered electors		6,638		
Conservative win (new seat)				
Conservative win (new seat)				
Conservative win (new seat)				

=== Hartlebury ===
Hartlebury
Party	Candidate	Votes	%	±%
Conservative	Antony Hartley	444	57.5	–13.6
Green	Edward Broadley	157	20.3	N/A
Liberal Democrats	Sebastian Parsons	122	15.8	–13.1
Independent	Sheridan Tranter	49	6.3	N/A
Majority		287	37.2	
Turnout		776	31.3	+2.2
Registered electors		2,476		
Conservative hold				

=== Harvington & Norton ===
Harvington & Norton
Party	Candidate	Votes	%	±%
Conservative	Bradley Thomas*	484	51.9	N/A
Liberal Democrats	Pete Johnson	276	32.3	N/A
Green	Sarah Cohen	135	15.8	N/A
Majority		208	19.6	N/A
Turnout		901	38.3	N/A
Registered electors		2,353		
Conservative hold				

=== Honeybourne, Pebworth & The Littletons ===
Honeybourne, Pebworth & The Littletons (2 seats)
Party	Candidate	Votes	%	±%
Green	Hannah Robson	1,047	62.9	N/A
Green	Judith Ciotti	944	56.7	N/A
Conservative	Thomas Havemann-Mart*	552	33.2	N/A
Conservative	Neil Tustin	535	32.1	N/A
Turnout		1,652	34.4	N/A
Registered electors		4,800		
Green win (new seat)				
Green win (new seat)				

=== Inkberrow ===
Inkberrow (2 seats)
Party	Candidate	Votes	%	±%
Conservative	Ben Hurdman	1,076	64.6	N/A
Conservative	Nick Dawkes	1,070	64.3	N/A
Green	David Chamberlain	549	33.0	N/A
Green	Doug Hincks	481	28.9	N/A
Liberal Democrats	Paul Greene	402	24.1	N/A
Turnout		1,933	37.2	N/A
Registered electors		5,203		
Conservative hold				
Conservative hold				

=== North Claines & Salwarpe ===
North Claines & Salwarpe (2 seats)
Party	Candidate	Votes	%	±%
Conservative	Nicolas Wright*	815	56.9	N/A
Conservative	Daniel Birch	813	56.8	N/A
Labour	James Knudsen	554	38.7	N/A
Turnout		1,432	28.6	N/A
Registered electors		5,012		
Conservative win (new seat)				
Conservative win (new seat)				

=== Ombersley ===
Ombersley
Party	Candidate	Votes	%	±%
Conservative	Christopher Day*	578	76.1	+2.3
Labour	Catherine Neville	182	23.9	N/A
Majority		396	52.2	
Turnout		766	31.3	–4.9
Registered electors		2,447		
Conservative hold				

=== Pershore ===
Pershore (3 seats)
Party	Candidate	Votes	%	±%
Liberal Democrats	Dan Boatright*	1,763	71.9	+19.1
Liberal Democrats	Jodi Arnold	1,466	59.8	+13.5
Liberal Democrats	Charles Tucker*	1,435	58.5	+6.2
Conservative	Val Wood	689	28.1	–12.8
Conservative	Michael Hodges	621	25.3	–9.8
Conservative	Sam Tarran	503	20.5	−14.56
Labour	John Rees	294	12.0	–4.7
Turnout		2,453	37.0	–1.2
Registered electors		6,622		
Liberal Democrats hold				
Liberal Democrats hold				
Liberal Democrats hold				

=== Pinvin ===
Pinvin
Party	Candidate	Votes	%	±%
Liberal Democrats	Liz Tucker*	795	79.5	N/A
Conservative	Sharon Stirling	205	20.5	N/A
Majority		590	59.0	N/A
Turnout		1,005	39.8	N/A
Registered electors		2,523		
Liberal Democrats hold				

=== Upton Snodsbury ===
Upton Snodsbury
Party	Candidate	Votes	%	±%
Conservative	Linda Robinson*	635	69.9	–3.7
Liberal Democrats	Trevor Battersby	273	30.1	+3.7
Majority		362	39.8	
Turnout		913	41.2	+2.0
Registered electors		2,218		
Conservative hold		Swing	▼3.7	

== Changes 2023–2027 ==
- Emma Sims, elected as a Conservative councillor for Broadway, Sedgeberrow & Childswickham, left the party in June 2025 to join the Liberal Democrats, citing "the absolute lack of any policies that are important to helping residents and communities in these challenging times".

== By-elections ==
=== Evesham South ===
The Evesham South by-election was triggered by the death of Green Party councillor Ed Cohen in June 2023, a month into his second term.

Evesham South by-election 10 August 2023
Party	Candidate	Votes	%	±%
Green	Peter Knight	319	45.2	
Conservative	Stan Brotherton	177	25.1	
Independent	Julie Haines	82	11.6	
Labour	David Tasker	79	11.2	
Independent	Matt Snape	36	5.1	
Liberal Democrats	David Quayle	12	1.7	
Majority		142	20.1	
Turnout		705		
Green hold		Swing		

=== Badsey & Aldington ===
The Badsey & Aldington by-election was triggered by the resignation of Conservative councillor Philippa Capel, who stood down after just over a year in office.

Badsey & Aldington by-election 29 August 2024
Party	Candidate	Votes	%	±%
Conservative	Mark Ward	186	32.7	−23.5
Liberal Democrats	Matthew Jones	164	28.8	+28.8
Independent	Rob Robinson	156	27.4	+27.4
Labour	Mary Campbell	63	11.1	−32.7
Majority		22	3.9	
Turnout		569		
Conservative hold		Swing		

=== Harvington & Norton ===
The Harvington & Norton by-election was triggered by the resignation of Conservative councillor Bradley Thomas, the council's former leader, after his election as Member of Parliament for Bromsgrove at the 2024 United Kingdom general election.

Harvington & Norton by-election 29 August 2024
Party	Candidate	Votes	%	±%
Independent	Craig Reeves	327	42.6	+42.6
Conservative	Steve Mackay	195	25.4	−26.5
Liberal Democrats	Pete Johnson	192	25.0	−7.3
Labour	Alan Humphries	53	6.9	+6.9
Majority		132	17.2	
Turnout		767		
Independent gain from Conservative		Swing		

=== Bretforton & Offenham ===
The Bretforton & Offenham by-election was triggered by the resignation of Conservative councillor Aaron Powell, who took up a politically restricted post as director of digital and data transformation at the West Midlands Combined Authority.

Bretforton & Offenham by-election: 9 October 2025
Party	Candidate	Votes	%	±%
Reform	Matthew Winfield	357	43.5	N/A
Green	Marino Cretu	213	25.9	N/A
Conservative	Mary Smith	165	20.1	–32.6
Labour	Amanda Capewell	33	4.0	–25.3
Liberal Democrats	Matt Jones	31	3.8	–10.2
Independent	Joe Davin	12	1.5	N/A
Independent	Rob Robinson	10	1.2	N/A
Majority		144	17.6	N/A
Turnout		823	36.3	+4.6
Registered electors		2,270		
Reform gain from Conservative				

=== Hartlebury ===
Hartlebury by-election: 22 October 2026
Party	Candidate	Votes	%	±%
Conservative	Tony Miller	315	49.9	−7.6
Reform	Jake Richardson	238	37.7	N/A
Labour	Susan Evans	78	12.4	N/A
Majority		77	12.2	−25.0
Turnout		631	25.2	−6.1
Conservative hold		Swing		
