= 2019 Wychavon District Council election =

2019 UK local government election

- 2 May 2019

All 45 seats to Wychavon District Council 23 seats needed for a majority

	First party	Second party
Party	Conservative	Liberal Democrats
Last election	39 seats, 58.2%	5 seats, 14.5%
Seats won	36	6
Seat change	▼3	▲1
Popular vote	20,611	9,896
Percentage	53.5%	25.7%
Swing	▼4.7%	▲11.2%
	Third party	Fourth party
Party	Green	Independent
Last election	0 seats, 7.5%	0 seats, 4.1%
Seats won	2	1
Seat change	▲2	▲1
Popular vote	3,166	2,362
Percentage	8.2%	6.1%
Swing	▲0.7%	▲2.0%
- Map of the results of the 2019 Wychavon District Council election
Council control before election
Conservative
Council control after election
Conservative

The 2019 Wychavon District Council election took place on 2 May 2019 to elect members of Wychavon District Council. This was on the same day as other local elections. The entire council (45 seats) was up for election. The Conservatives lost 5 seats (2 to the Liberal Democrats, 2 to the Green Party, and 1 to an independent), and gained 2 seats (1 from the Liberal Democrats, and 1 held defection from UKIP), bringing their total on the council to 36. 7 wards (Bretforton & Offenham, Dodderhill, Eckington, Harvington & Norton, Inkberrow, Norton and Whittington, and South Bredon Hill) did not hold a vote, as an equal number of candidates ran as seats available.

== Summary ==
=== Election result ===
2019 Wychavon District Council election
Party	Candidates	Seats	Gains	Losses	Net gain/loss	Seats %	Votes %	Votes	+/−
Conservative	43	36	2	5	▼3	80.0	53.5	20,611	–4.7
Liberal Democrats	23	6	2	1	▲1	13.3	25.7	9,896	+11.2
Green	9	2	2	0	▲2	4.4	8.2	3,166	+0.7
Independent	6	1	1	0	▲1	2.2	6.1	2,362	+2.0
Labour	10	0	0	0	Steady	0.0	6.1	2,360	+0.1
Monster Raving Loony	1	0	0	0	Steady	0.0	0.3	104	–0.1

UKIP lost a seat which is not shown in the table above as they stood no candidates at this election.

== Results by ward ==
=== Badsey ===
Badsey
Party	Candidate	Votes	%
Conservative	Mark Goodge	502	75.15
Labour	Martin Vernall	166	24.85
Turnout		699	27.54
Conservative hold			

=== Bengeworth ===
Bengeworth
Party	Candidate	Votes	%
Conservative	Martin King	636	49.92
Conservative	Emma Stokes	618	48.51
Labour	Mary Campbell	346	27.16
Liberal Democrats	Julie Haines	342	26.84
Liberal Democrats	Timothy Haines	267	20.96
Turnout		1,333	25.08
Conservative hold			
Conservative hold			

=== Bowbrook ===
Bowbrook
Party	Candidate	Votes	%
Liberal Democrats	Alexandra Rowley	603	64.35
Conservative	Gordon Brookes	334	35.65
Turnout		955	40.33
Liberal Democrats hold			

=== Bredon ===
Bredon
Party	Candidate	Votes	%
Conservative	Adrian Hardman	583	78.68
Labour	Rehan Yunus	158	21.32
Turnout		770	36.61
Conservative hold			

=== Bretforton and Offenham ===
Bretforton and Offenham
Party	Candidate	Votes	%
Conservative	Aaron Powell	N/A	N/A
Turnout		N/A	N/A
Conservative gain from Liberal Democrats			

No contest was held here, as just 1 candidate ran for the seat.

=== Broadway and Wickhamford ===
Broadway and Wickhamford
Party	Candidate	Votes	%
Independent	Nigel Robinson	914	59.70
Conservative	Elizabeth Eyre	736	48.07
Conservative	Emma Sims	667	43.57
Labour	Sally Tomlinson	195	12.74
Turnout		1,539	39.17
Independent gain from Conservative			
Conservative hold			

=== Dodderhill ===
Dodderhill
Party	Candidate	Votes	%
Conservative	Laurence Smith	N/A	N/A
Turnout		N/A	N/A
Conservative hold			

No contest was held here, as just 1 candidate ran for the seat.

=== Drakes Broughton ===
Drakes Broughton
Party	Candidate	Votes	%
Conservative	Mark Ward	409	56.73
Liberal Democrats	Elizabeth Turier	312	43.27
Turnout		734	35.56
Conservative hold			

=== Droitwich Central ===
Droitwich Central
Party	Candidate	Votes	%
Conservative	John Hartley	215	40.72
Labour	Alan Humphries	180	34.09
Liberal Democrats	Charles Murray	133	25.19
Turnout		547	28.20
Conservative hold			

Droitwich Central ward was abolished in the 2023 Boundary Commission review.

=== Droitwich East ===
Droitwich East
Party	Candidate	Votes	%
Conservative	Alexander Sinton	838	65.16
Conservative	Eric Bowden	739	57.47
Liberal Democrats	Wendy Carter	551	42.85
Turnout		1,340	31.40
Conservative hold			
Conservative hold			

=== Droitwich South East ===
Droitwich South East
Party	Candidate	Votes	%
Conservative	Richard Morris	1,114	68.94
Conservative	John Grady	891	55.14
Green	Neil Franks	303	18.75
Liberal Democrats	John Littlechild	288	17.82
Liberal Democrats	Stephanie Vale	239	14.79
Green	Jane Zurek	202	12.50
Turnout		1,642	35.79
Conservative hold			
Conservative hold			

=== Droitwich South West ===
Droitwich South West
Party	Candidate	Votes	%
Conservative	David Morris	653	52.62
Conservative	Matthew Hartley	589	47.46
Liberal Democrats	Paul Wiseman	577	46.49
Liberal Democrats	Adrian Key	505	40.69
Turnout		1,289	33.63
Conservative hold			
Conservative hold			

=== Droitwich West ===
Droitwich West
Party	Candidate	Votes	%
Conservative	George Duffy	384	47.41
Conservative	Jennifer Chaudry	327	40.37
Labour	Valerie Humphries	260	32.10
Liberal Democrats	Rodney Hopkins	248	30.62
Labour	Seth Pearson	214	26.42
Turnout		846	22.32
Conservative hold			
Conservative hold			

=== Eckington ===
Eckington
Party	Candidate	Votes	%
Conservative	Ronald Davis	N/A	N/A
Turnout		N/A	N/A
Conservative hold			

No contest was held here, as just 1 candidate ran for the seat.

=== Elmley Castle and Somerville ===
Elmley Castle and Somerville
Party	Candidate	Votes	%
Conservative	George Mackison	470	60.18
Green	Darren Corbett	311	39.82
Turnout		800	39.31
Conservative hold			

=== Evesham North ===
Evesham North
Party	Candidate	Votes	%
Conservative	Robert Raphael	441	39.87
Conservative	Peter Griffiths	421	38.07
Independent	Gary Hale	406	36.71
Independent	Emma Nishigaki	375	33.91
Labour	John Gowers	286	25.86
Turnout		1,126	29.70
Conservative hold			
Conservative hold			

=== Evesham South ===
Evesham South
Party	Candidate	Votes	%
Green	Julie Tucker	650	57.68
Green	Edward Cohen	393	34.87
Conservative	Paul Bennett	350	31.06
Conservative	Matthew Snape	339	30.08
Independent	Christine Smith	213	18.90
Monster Raving Loony	Paul Brockman	104	9.23
Turnout		1,136	28.64
Green gain from Conservative			
Green gain from Conservative			

=== Fladbury ===
Fladbury
Party	Candidate	Votes	%
Conservative	Michael Rowley	522	63.97
Liberal Democrats	Diana Brown	294	36.03
Turnout		832	36.22
Conservative hold			

=== Great Hampton ===
Great Hampton
Party	Candidate	Votes	%
Conservative	Gerald Bearcroft	459	56.95
Green	Sarah Cohen	347	43.05
Turnout		840	31.19
Conservative gain from UKIP			

Gerald Bearcroft was the incumbent councillor, having been elected for UKIP in 2015.

=== Hartlebury ===
Hartlebury
Party	Candidate	Votes	%
Conservative	Stephen Bateman	467	71.08
Liberal Democrats	Sebastian Parsons	190	28.92
Turnout		680	29.10
Conservative hold			

=== Harvington and Norton ===
Harvington and Norton
Party	Candidate	Votes	%
Conservative	Bradley Thomas	N/A	N/A
Turnout		N/A	N/A
Conservative hold			

No contest was held here, as just 1 candidate ran for the seat.

=== Honeybourne and Pebworth ===
Honeybourne and Pebworth
Party	Candidate	Votes	%
Conservative	Thomas Havemann-Mart	404	58.64
Green	Patrick Hogan	285	41.36
Turnout		701	29.68
Conservative hold			

=== Inkberrow ===
Inkberrow
Party	Candidate	Votes	%
Conservative	Audrey Steel	N/A	N/A
Conservative	David Wilkinson	N/A	N/A
Turnout		N/A	N/A
Conservative hold			
Conservative hold			

No contest was held here, as just 2 candidates ran for the 2 seats.

=== Little Hampton ===
Little Hampton
Party	Candidate	Votes	%
Conservative	Andrew Dyke	475	47.98
Conservative	Frances Smith	419	42.32
Independent	Sarah Schaathun	301	30.40
Liberal Democrats	David Quayle	201	20.30
Labour	Roslyn Gowers	166	16.77
Independent	Jonathan Thompson	153	15.45
Turnout		1,001	25.04
Conservative hold			
Conservative hold			

=== Lovett and North Claines ===
Lovett and North Claines
Party	Candidate	Votes	%
Conservative	Anthony Miller	1,097	66.53
Conservative	Nicolas Wright	892	54.09
Liberal Democrats	Judith Cussen	385	23.35
Green	Sheila Grant	344	20.86
Liberal Democrats	Thomas Coe	254	15.40
Turnout		1,682	33.49
Conservative hold			
Conservative hold			

=== Norton and Whittington ===
Norton and Whittington
Party	Candidate	Votes	%
Conservative	Robert Adams	N/A	N/A
Turnout		N/A	N/A
Conservative hold			

No contest was held here, as just 1 candidate ran for the seat.

=== Ombersley ===
Ombersley
Party	Candidate	Votes	%
Conservative	Christopher Day	508	73.84
Liberal Democrats	George Smart	180	26.16
Turnout		707	36.15
Conservative hold			

=== Pershore ===
Pershore
Party	Candidate	Votes	%
Liberal Democrats	Charles Tucker	1,234	52.83
Liberal Democrats	Carolyn Harford	1,082	46.32
Liberal Democrats	Daniel Boatright	1,065	45.59
Conservative	Valerie Wood	956	40.92
Conservative	Samuel Tarran	819	35.06
Labour	Misan McFarland	389	16.65
Turnout		2,383	38.15
Liberal Democrats hold			
Liberal Democrats gain from Conservative			
Liberal Democrats gain from Conservative			

=== Pinvin ===
Pinvin
Party	Candidate	Votes	%
Liberal Democrats	Elizabeth Tucker	719	70.21
Conservative	Joshua Godfrey	305	29.79
Turnout		1,038	43.09
Liberal Democrats hold			

=== South Bredon Hill ===
South Bredon Hill
Party	Candidate	Votes	%
Liberal Democrats	Adrian Darby	N/A	N/A
Turnout		N/A	N/A
Liberal Democrats hold			

No contest was held here, as just 1 candidate ran for the seat.

=== The Littletons ===
The Littletons
Party	Candidate	Votes	%
Conservative	Richard Lasota	398	54.60
Green	Nicola Jennings	331	45.40
Turnout		739	31.53
Conservative hold			

=== Upton Snodsbury ===
Upton Snodsbury
Party	Candidate	Votes	%
Conservative	Linda Robinson	634	73.64
Liberal Democrats	Nicholas Wiltshire	227	26.36
Turnout		875	39.20
Conservative hold			

== Changes 2019–2023 ==
- Mark Goodge, elected as a Conservative councillor for Badsey, voluntarily withdrew from the Conservative group in November 2020 pending a party investigation, after making a reference to a song by convicted paedophile Rolf Harris during a council discussion; he later rejoined the group.

== By-elections ==
=== Elmley Castle and Somerville ===
Elmley Castle and Somerville: 6 May 2021
Party	Candidate	Votes	%	±%
Conservative	Emma Kearsey	632	66.7	+6.5
Green	Jeffrey Spragg	316	33.3	−6.5
Majority		316	33.3	
Turnout		948		
Conservative hold		Swing		

=== The Littletons ===
The Littletons by-election was triggered by the death of Conservative councillor Richard Lasota, aged 71, who had served since 2011.

The Littletons: 13 January 2022
Party	Candidate	Votes	%	±%
Green	Hannah Robson	291	39.1	−6.3
Conservative	Mary Smith	274	36.8	−17.8
Liberal Democrats	David Quayle	179	24.1	N/A
Majority		17	2.3	
Turnout		744	32.0	
Green gain from Conservative		Swing	▲5.8	

=== Dodderhill ===
The Dodderhill by-election followed a vacancy in the office of councillor, formally noticed on 24 June 2022.

Dodderhill: 11 August 2022
Party	Candidate	Votes	%	±%
Conservative	Rick Deller	199	48.9	N/A
Green	Susan Howarth	176	43.2	N/A
Liberal Democrats	John Littlechild	32	7.9	N/A
Majority		23	5.7	
Turnout		407		
Conservative hold		Swing		
