= 1999 Wychavon District Council election =

1999 UK local government election

The 1999 Wychavon District Council election took place on 6 May 1999 to elect members of Wychavon District Council in Worcestershire, England. The whole council was up for election and the Conservative Party gained overall control of the council from no overall control.

== Background ==
Before the election the Conservatives were the largest party on the council with 18 seats, but the Liberal Democrats with 17 seats ran the council with the support of the 10 Labour councillors and there were also 4 independent councillors. 49 seats were up for election in 1999, but the Conservatives won two seats in Harvington and Norton and Wickhamford without opposition.

== Election result ==
The Conservatives gained 11 seats to take control of the council with 29 councillors, in only the second time after 1987 that the Conservatives won a majority on the council. Both the Liberal Democrat leader of the council, John Grantham, and the Labour group leader John Wrenn were among the councilors to be defeated at the election.

Wychavon local election result 1999
Party	Seats	Gains	Losses	Net gain/loss	Seats %	Votes %	Votes	+/−
Conservative	29			+11	59.2	45.6	21,636	
Liberal Democrats	11			-6	22.4	27.9	13,242	
Labour	5			-5	10.2	15.3	7,245	
Independent	3			0	6.1	8.6	4,098	
Ind. Conservative	1			0	2.0	1.8	875	
Green	0	0	0	0	0	0.7	309	

== Ward results ==
Badsey
Party	Candidate	Votes	%	±%
Liberal Democrats	Sonya Ealey	362	58.1	
Conservative	Paul Middlebrough	181	29.1	
Labour	Fiona Watson	80	12.8	
Majority		181	29.1	
Turnout		623	28.2	

Bowbook
Party	Candidate	Votes	%	±%
Liberal Democrats	Margaret Rowley	570	69.3	
Conservative	Anthony Warren	252	30.7	
Majority		318	38.7	
Turnout		822	45.4	

Bredon
Party	Candidate	Votes	%	±%
Conservative	John Lewis	576	51.2	
Liberal Democrats	Linda Stone	480	42.7	
Labour	Ross Hayman	69	6.1	
Majority		96	8.5	
Turnout		1,125	50.6	

Bretforton and Offenham
Party	Candidate	Votes	%	±%
Liberal Democrats	George Bourne	300	43.8	
Independent	Hazel Mitchell	175	25.5	
Independent	Junay England	154	22.5	
Labour	Susan Hocking	56	8.2	
Majority		125	18.2	
Turnout		685	35.7	

Broadway (2 seats)
Party	Candidate	Votes	%	±%
Conservative	David Folkes	587		
Conservative	Stuart Bates	571		
Independent	Terence Waldron	349		
Labour	Brian Chilver	215		
Turnout		1,722	39.3	

Dodderhill
Party	Candidate	Votes	%	±%
Conservative	Charles Richardson	312	67.7	
Labour	Eve Freer	102	22.1	
Independent	Derek Prior	47	10.2	
Majority		210	45.6	
Turnout		461	29.7	

Drakes Broughton
Party	Candidate	Votes	%	±%
Liberal Democrats	Ralph Mason	419	63.1	
Conservative	Michael Whitehead	177	26.7	
Labour	Anne Frazier	68	10.2	
Majority		242	36.4	
Turnout		664	35.2	

Droitwich Central (3 seats)
Party	Candidate	Votes	%	±%
Conservative	Pamela Davey	1,049		
Conservative	David Hall	1,017		
Conservative	Hugh Hamilton	996		
Labour	Sheila Neary	804		
Labour	John Wrenn	791		
Labour	Bill Baker	769		
Turnout		5,426	36.2	

Droitwich South (3 seats)
Party	Candidate	Votes	%	±%
Conservative	Michael Barratt	1,398		
Conservative	Eileen Hope	1,360		
Conservative	Donald Lawley	1,238		
Liberal Democrats	Graham Gopsill	873		
Liberal Democrats	Josephine Wilkinson	852		
Liberal Democrats	Pamela Jackson-Smith	822		
Independent	Ronald Waters	593		
Turnout		6,314	34.5	

Droitwich West (3 seats)
Party	Candidate	Votes	%	±%
Labour	Peter Pinfield	633		
Labour	Keith Rogers	590		
Labour	Roy Seabourne	561		
Conservative	Royston Hadland	406		
Conservative	Laurence Evans	396		
Conservative	Paul Sharpe	390		
Turnout		2,976	22.7	

Eckington
Party	Candidate	Votes	%	±%
Conservative	Peter Wright	438	50.9	
Liberal Democrats	Andrew Wall	305	35.5	
Labour	Priscilla Cameron	117	13.6	
Majority		133	15.5	
Turnout		860	42.0	

Elmley Castle
Party	Candidate	Votes	%	±%
Conservative	Malcolm Meikle	553	70.9	
Liberal Democrats	Richard Neath	178	22.8	
Labour	Warwick Holland	49	6.3	
Majority		375	48.1	
Turnout		780	52.3	

Evesham East
Party	Candidate	Votes	%	±%
Labour	Richard Hicks	189	36.4	
Conservative	David Alesbury	181	34.9	
Independent	Ronald Stow	99	19.1	
Green	Norbert Tucker	50	9.6	
Majority		8	1.5	
Turnout		519	28.4	

Evesham Hampton (3 seats)
Party	Candidate	Votes	%	±%
Conservative	John Smith	915		
Conservative	James Griffiths	815		
Liberal Democrats	John Payne	536		
Liberal Democrats	Timothy Haines	408		
Liberal Democrats	Helen Martin	366		
Labour	Robin Lunn	363		
Turnout		3,403	33.0	

Evesham North
Party	Candidate	Votes	%	±%
Conservative	Josephine Sandalls	350	57.0	
Labour	Stephen Selby	264	43.0	
Majority		86	14.0	
Turnout		614	32.3	

Evesham South (2 seats)
Party	Candidate	Votes	%	±%
Conservative	Ronald Cartwright	857		
Conservative	Martin Jennings	768		
Labour	Susan Hayman	456		
Liberal Democrats	Julie Steer	398		
Liberal Democrats	Diana Brown	385		
Turnout		2,864	25.6	

Evesham West
Party	Candidate	Votes	%	±%
Labour	Michael Worrall	287	62.7	
Conservative	Tony Dolphin	171	37.3	
Majority		116	25.3	
Turnout		458	23.4	

Fladbury
Party	Candidate	Votes	%	±%
Conservative	Bernard Lee	479	56.2	
Independent	Thomas Mitchell	374	43.8	
Majority		105	12.3	
Turnout		853	51.8	

Hanbury
Party	Candidate	Votes	%	±%
Conservative	Anthony Hotham	305	78.8	
Liberal Democrats	Donald Aldridge	82	21.2	
Majority		223	57.6	
Turnout		387	41.2	

Hartlebury
Party	Candidate	Votes	%	±%
Conservative	Muriel Mathews	401	59.1	
Liberal Democrats	David Terry	277	40.9	
Majority		124	18.3	
Turnout		678	32.5	

Havington and Norton
Party	Candidate	Votes	%	±%
Conservative	Clive Holt	unopposed		

Honeybourne and Pebworth
Party	Candidate	Votes	%	±%
Liberal Democrats	Thomas Bean	401	68.4	
Conservative	Caroline Spencer	130	22.2	
Labour	Rebecca Such	55	9.4	
Majority		271	46.2	
Turnout		586	34.3	

Inkberrow
Party	Candidate	Votes	%	±%
Ind. Conservative	Audrey Steel	591	52.6	
Liberal Democrats	Renate Phillips	451	40.2	
Labour	Bruce Thomas	81	7.2	
Majority		140	12.5	
Turnout		1,123	45.7	

Lenches
Party	Candidate	Votes	%	±%
Conservative	David Lee	281	64.6	
Liberal Democrats	Martyn Cracknell	82	18.9	
Labour	Martin Davey	72	16.6	
Majority		199	45.7	
Turnout		435	45.8	

Lovett
Party	Candidate	Votes	%	±%
Conservative	Andrew Christian-Brookes	405	76.0	
Liberal Democrats	Judith Cussen	128	24.0	
Majority		277	52.0	
Turnout		533	37.8	

North Claines (2 seats)
Party	Candidate	Votes	%	±%
Liberal Democrats	Anthony Miller	573		
Conservative	Paul Coley	472		
Conservative	John Jeffrey	421		
Liberal Democrats	Janet Saunders	404		
Turnout		1,870	42.8	

Ombersley
Party	Candidate	Votes	%	±%
Conservative	Jean Dowty	525	72.2	
Liberal Democrats	David Parkinson	202	27.8	
Majority		323	44.4	
Turnout		727	42.2	

Pershore Holy Cross (2 seats)
Party	Candidate	Votes	%	±%
Conservative	Richard Hampton	471		
Conservative	Trudy Burge	466		
Liberal Democrats	John Grantham	456		
Liberal Democrats	Charles Tucker	412		
Labour	Lynda Fotherington	145		
Turnout		1,950	35.1	

Pershore St Andrews (2 seats)
Party	Candidate	Votes	%	±%
Independent	Victor Smith	754		
Liberal Democrats	Shirley Newman	405		
Independent	Kenneth Chambers	357		
Green	David Shaw	259		
Labour	Emma Kirbyson	252		
Turnout		2,027	36.3	

Pinvin
Party	Candidate	Votes	%	±%
Liberal Democrats	Malcolm Argyle	595	59.5	
Conservative	Gary Robinson	405	40.5	
Majority		190	19.0	
Turnout		1,000	46.2	

Somerville
Party	Candidate	Votes	%	±%
Independent	Gerald Barnett	544	81.8	
Labour	Stanley Banks	121	18.2	
Majority		423	63.6	
Turnout		665	42.8	

South Bredon Hill
Party	Candidate	Votes	%	±%
Liberal Democrats	Adrian Darby	356	53.9	
Ind. Conservative	Rupert Ellis	284	43.0	
Labour	Robert Kirbyson	20	3.0	
Majority		72	10.9	
Turnout		660	61.9	

Spetchley
Party	Candidate	Votes	%	±%
Conservative	Robert Adams	559	61.4	
Liberal Democrats	Barrie Redding	352	38.6	
Majority		207	22.7	
Turnout		911	39.0	

The Littletons
Party	Candidate	Votes	%	±%
Independent	Richard Lasota	652	64.4	
Liberal Democrats	Penelope Christison	324	32.0	
Labour	Jon Baker	36	3.6	
Majority		328	32.4	
Turnout		1,012	45.8	

Upton Snodsbury
Party	Candidate	Votes	%	±%
Liberal Democrats	Elizabeth Tucker	488	57.4	
Conservative	Lynn Gorman	362	42.6	
Majority		126	14.8	
Turnout		850	51.3	

Wickhamford
Party	Candidate	Votes	%	±%
Conservative	David Noyes	unopposed		

== By-elections between 1999 and 2003 ==
=== Evesham East ===
A by-election was held in Evesham East on 9 November 2000 after the resignation of Labour councillor Richard Hicks. The seat was gained for the Conservatives by Andy Dyke with a majority of 25 votes over Labour candidate Steve Selby.

Evesham East by-election 9 November 2000
Party	Candidate	Votes	%	±%
Conservative	Andy Dyke	270	52.4	+17.5
Labour	Steve Selby	245	47.6	+11.2
Majority		25	4.8	
Turnout		515	28.9	+0.5
Conservative gain from Labour		Swing		

=== Dodderhill ===
A by-election was held in Dodderhill on 16 May 2002 after the death of Conservative councillor Charles Richardson. The seat was held for the Conservatives by Judith Pearce with a majority of 58 votes over independent candidate Warren Lewis.

Dodder Hill by-election 16 May 2002
Party	Candidate	Votes	%	±%
Conservative	Judith Pearce	264	40.1	−27.6
Independent	Warren Lewis	206	31.3	+21.1
Liberal Democrats	Derek Prior	108	16.4	+16.4
Labour	Chris Barton	81	12.3	−9.8
Majority		58	8.8	−36.8
Turnout		659	38.9	+9.2
Conservative hold		Swing		

=== Drakes Broughton ===
A by-election was held in Drakes Broughton on 18 July 2002 following the resignation of Liberal Democrat councillor Ralph Mason. The seat was gained for the Conservatives by Paul Middlebrough with a 3-vote majority over Liberal Democrat Josephine Wilkinson.

Drakes Broughton by-election 18 July 2002
Party	Candidate	Votes	%	±%
Conservative	Paul Middlebrough	373	50.2	+23.5
Liberal Democrats	Josephine Wilkinson	370	49.8	−13.3
Majority		3	0.4	
Turnout		743	39.4	+4.2
Conservative gain from Liberal Democrats		Swing		
