= 2003 Wychavon District Council election =

2003 UK local government election

Map of the results of the 2003 Wychavon District Council election. Conservatives in blue, Liberal Democrats in yellow and Labour in red.

The 2003 Wychavon District Council election took place on 1 May 2003 to elect members of Wychavon District Council in Worcestershire, England. The whole council was up for election with boundary changes since the last election in 1999 reducing the number of seats by four. The Conservative Party stayed in overall control of the council.

== Background ==
Before the election the Conservatives controlled the council with 33 councillors, while the Liberal Democrats had 10 seats, Labour had 3, there was 1 independent and 2 seats were vacant. Boundary changes since 1999 reduced the number of wards from 36 to 32 and the number of councillors fell by four. Although all of the seats on the council were up for election, in Norton and Whittington, and Pinvin, there was no election as there was only one candidate in each ward.

One-third of the Conservative councillors stood down at the election, as well as independent John Smith who had represented Pershore on Wychavon District Council from its first election in 1973.

== Election result ==
The Conservatives remained in control of the council after winning 31 of the 45 seats on the council. The Liberal Democrats remained the largest opposition with 12 seats, while Labour took two seats. Overall turnout at the election was 37.94%, almost 4% higher than at the 1999 election.

Among the defeated candidates was the Labour leader on Worcestershire County Council, Peter Pinfield, who lost in Droitwich East. Meanwhile, the Conservative leader of the council, Malcolm Meikle, held his seat by 39 votes and the Liberal Democrat group leader, Margaret Rowley was elected by 19 votes after recounts in both wards. However the Conservatives did lose seats in Pershore, where the Liberal Democrats won all three seats for the ward.

Wychavon local election result 2003
Party	Seats	Gains	Losses	Net gain/loss	Seats %	Votes %	Votes	+/−
Conservative	31			-2	68.9	53.6	23,316	+8.0
Liberal Democrats	12			+2	26.7	28.3	12,316	+0.4
Labour	2			-2	4.4	11.1	4,841	-4.2
Independent	0			-2	0.0	6.4	2,767	-2.2
Green	0			0	0.0	0.7	285	+0.0

== Ward results ==
Badsey
Party	Candidate	Votes	%	±%
Liberal Democrats	Sonya Ealey	321	50.7	
Conservative	Reginald Jakeman	312	49.3	
Majority		9	1.4	
Turnout		633	30.1	

Bengeworth (2 seats)
Party	Candidate	Votes	%	±%
Conservative	Martin Jennings	514		
Conservative	Emma Stokes	421		
Labour	Stephen Selby	319		
Independent	Albert Booth	312		
Turnout		1,566	28.9	

Bowbrook
Party	Candidate	Votes	%	±%
Liberal Democrats	Alexandra Rowley	471	51.0	
Conservative	Christopher Hartwright	452	49.0	
Majority		19	2.1	
Turnout		923	47.9	

Bredon
Party	Candidate	Votes	%	±%
Conservative	Adrian Hardman	487	63.5	
Liberal Democrats	Jeanette Way	218	28.4	
Labour	Peter Kelson	62	8.1	
Majority		269	35.1	
Turnout		767	38.9	

Bretforton and Offenham
Party	Candidate	Votes	%	±%
Liberal Democrats	George Bourne	409	67.0	
Conservative	Patrick Clifford	201	33.0	
Majority		208	34.1	
Turnout		610	30.3	

Broadway and Wickhamford (2 seats)
Party	Candidate	Votes	%	±%
Conservative	David Folkes	964		
Conservative	David Noyes	774		
Liberal Democrats	Carolyn Harford	343		
Turnout		2,081	32.7	

Dodderhill
Party	Candidate	Votes	%	±%
Conservative	Judith Pearce	393	69.1	
Liberal Democrats	Derek Prior	176	30.9	
Majority		217	38.1	
Turnout		569	32.2	

Drakes Broughton
Party	Candidate	Votes	%	±%
Conservative	Paul Middlebrough	417	58.8	
Liberal Democrats	Josephine Wilkinson	292	41.2	
Majority		125	17.6	
Turnout		709	37.5	

Droitwich Central
Party	Candidate	Votes	%	±%
Liberal Democrats	Graham Gopsill	238	37.4	
Labour	Eve Freer	235	36.9	
Conservative	Glenise Noyes	164	25.7	
Majority		3	0.5	
Turnout		637	30.2	

Droitwich East (2 seats)
Party	Candidate	Votes	%	±%
Conservative	Michael Barratt	788		
Conservative	Pamela Davey	716		
Labour	Peter Pinfield	691		
Labour	Sheila Neary	667		
Turnout		2,862	35.3	

Droitwich South East (2 seats)
Party	Candidate	Votes	%	±%
Conservative	Eileen Hope	730		
Conservative	Donald Lawley	645		
Independent	Ronald Waters	487		
Labour	Bill Baker	286		
Labour	Jon Baker	264		
Turnout		2,412	33.8	

Droitwich South West (2 seats)
Party	Candidate	Votes	%	±%
Conservative	Terence Spencer	497		
Conservative	Maureen Lawley	476		
Liberal Democrats	Wendy Carter	391		
Independent	Claude Heeley	358		
Labour	John Cook	324		
Liberal Democrats	Pamela Jackson-Smith	282		
Labour	Sheila Seabourne	278		
Turnout		2,606	34.6	

Droitwich West (2 seats)
Party	Candidate	Votes	%	±%
Labour	Roy Seabourne	473		
Labour	John Wrenn	442		
Conservative	Laurence Evans	314		
Conservative	Alan Fisher	306		
Turnout		1,535	21.1	

Ecckington
Party	Candidate	Votes	%	±%
Conservative	Peter Wright	507	59.1	
Liberal Democrats	Roy Chiverton	234	27.3	
Labour	Priscilla Cameron	117	13.6	
Majority		273	31.8	
Turnout		858	39.0	

Elmley Castle and Somerville
Party	Candidate	Votes	%	±%
Conservative	Dorothy Mackison	558	62.3	
Liberal Democrats	Garth Raymer	338	37.7	
Majority		220	24.6	
Turnout		896	45.1	

Evesham North (2 seats)
Party	Candidate	Votes	%	±%
Conservative	Josephine Sandalls	461		
Conservative	Roma Kirke	436		
Labour	Robin Lunn	302		
Liberal Democrats	Pauline Christie	298		
Independent	Paul Rencher	220		
Turnout		1,717	28.1	

Evesham South (2 seats)
Party	Candidate	Votes	%	±%
Conservative	Ronald Cartwright	549		
Conservative	Robert Banks	504		
Liberal Democrats	Diana Brown	354		
Turnout		1,407	22.9	

Fladbury
Party	Candidate	Votes	%	±%
Conservative	Malcolm Meikle	558	49.3	
Liberal Democrats	Thomas McDonald	522	46.1	
Labour	Ross Hayman	52	4.6	
Majority		36	3.2	
Turnout		1,132	52.0	

Great Hampton
Party	Candidate	Votes	%	±%
Conservative	John Smith	420	68.4	
Liberal Democrats	Edward Martin	194	31.6	
Majority		226	36.8	
Turnout		614	29.8	

Hartlebury
Party	Candidate	Votes	%	±%
Conservative	Muriel Mathews	435	77.1	
Labour	Steven Westwood	129	22.9	
Majority		306	54.3	
Turnout		564	26.0	

Havington and Norton
Party	Candidate	Votes	%	±%
Conservative	Clive Holt	425	58.7	
Liberal Democrats	Noel Christie	299	41.3	
Majority		126	17.4	
Turnout		724	35.4	

Honeybourne and Pebworth
Party	Candidate	Votes	%	±%
Liberal Democrats	Thomas Bean	295	47.6	
Independent	Sharon Summers	180	29.0	
Conservative	Lesley Auden	145	23.4	
Majority		115	18.5	
Turnout		620	32.6	

Inkberrow (2 seats)
Party	Candidate	Votes	%	±%
Conservative	Audrey Steel	1,262		
Conservative	David Lee	1,093		
Liberal Democrats	Martin Davey	632		
Liberal Democrats	Donald Aldridge	518		
Turnout		3,505	41.3	

Little Hampton (2 seats)
Party	Candidate	Votes	%	±%
Conservative	Andrew Dyke	480		
Liberal Democrats	John Payne	420		
Conservative	John Stych	333		
Turnout		1,233	21.5	

Lovett and North Claines (2 seats)
Party	Candidate	Votes	%	±%
Conservative	Paul Coley	897		
Conservative	Andrew Christian-Brookes	870		
Liberal Democrats	Anthony Miller	556		
Liberal Democrats	Janet Saunders	457		
Turnout		2,780	35.8	

Norton and Whittington
Party	Candidate	Votes	%	±%
Conservative	Robert Adams	unopposed		

Ombersley
Party	Candidate	Votes	%	±%
Conservative	Jean Dowty	539	80.6	
Liberal Democrats	Judith Cussen	130	19.4	
Majority		409	61.1	
Turnout		669	36.5	

Pershore (3 seats)
Party	Candidate	Votes	%	±%
Liberal Democrats	Gaynor Amphhlett	898		
Liberal Democrats	John Grantham	785		
Liberal Democrats	Charles Tucker	731		
Conservative	Richard Hampton	654		
Conservative	Valerie Wood	607		
Conservative	Maurene Wilson	529		
Independent	Trudy Burge	455		
Independent	Raith Annis	328		
Green	David Shaw	285		
Independent	Malcolm Dalley	216		
Independent	Kenneth Rowe	211		
Labour	Susan Hayman	155		
Turnout		5,854	36.3	

Pinvin
Party	Candidate	Votes	%	±%
Liberal Democrats	Malcolm Argyle	unopposed		

South Bredon Hill
Party	Candidate	Votes	%	±%
Liberal Democrats	Adrian Darby	555	57.3	
Conservative	Beverley Hardman	368	38.0	
Labour	Fiona Cameron	45	4.6	
Majority		187	19.3	
Turnout		968	50.6	

The Littletons
Party	Candidate	Votes	%	±%
Conservative	Mary Smith	532	60.0	
Liberal Democrats	Helen Martin	354	40.0	
Majority		178	20.1	
Turnout		886	40.5	

Upton Snodsbury
Party	Candidate	Votes	%	±%
Liberal Democrats	Elizabeth Tucker	605	50.9	
Conservative	Linda Robinson	583	49.1	
Majority		22	1.9	
Turnout		1,188	55.8	
