= 2007 Wychavon District Council election =

2007 UK local government election

Map of the results of the 2007 Wychavon District Council election. Conservatives in blue and Liberal Democrats in yellow.

The 2007 Wychavon District Council election took place on 3 May 2007 to elect members of Wychavon District Council in Worcestershire, England. The whole council was up for election and the Conservative Party stayed in overall control of the council.

== Background ==
Before the election the Conservatives controlled the council with 31 councillors, compared to 12 for the Liberal Democrats and 2 for Labour. A total of 96 candidates stood for election including the first UK Independence Party candidate for Wychavon District Council in Evesham South, however the Conservative leader of the council, Martin Jennings was among those who stood down from the council at the election. One seat in Pinvin had no election in 2007 as the Liberal Democrat councillor Liz Tucker was re-elected without opposition.

== Election result ==
The Conservatives increased their majority on the council by four seats to have 35 of the 45 councillors on the council. This came at the expense of Labour, who lost their only two seats on the council in Droitwich West to the Conservatives, and the Liberal Democrats who had a net loss of two seats to finish with 10 councillors. Overall turnout at the election was 42.42%, an increase from 37.94% at the 2003 election.

Apart from the gains from Labour in Droitwich West, Conservative gains included taking seats from the Liberal Democrats in Honeybourne and Pebworth, Badsey and Little Hampton. However the Liberal Democrats did also gain seats in Droitwich South West and The Littletons from the Conservatives, with Alan Anderson taking The Littletons with a five-vote majority over independent Richard Lasota.

Wychavon local election result 2007
Party	Seats	Gains	Losses	Net gain/loss	Seats %	Votes %	Votes	+/−
Conservative	35	6	2	+4	77.8	59.0	32,450	+5.4
Liberal Democrats	10	2	4	-2	22.2	28.0	15,409	-0.3
Independent	0	0	0	0	0.0	5.8	3,163	-0.6
Labour	0	0	2	-2	0.0	5.3	2,902	-5.8
Green	0	0	0	0	0.0	1.3	734	+0.6
UKIP	0	0	0	0	0.0	0.6	334	+0.6

== Ward results ==
Badsey
Party	Candidate	Votes	%	±%
Conservative	Reginald Jakeman	413	51.1	+1.8
Liberal Democrats	Sonya Ealey	351	43.4	−7.3
Independent	Keith Sinclair	44	5.4	+5.4
Majority		62	7.7	
Turnout		808	38.4	+8.3
Conservative gain from Liberal Democrats		Swing		

Bengeworth (2 seats)
Party	Candidate	Votes	%	±%
Conservative	Martin King	723		
Conservative	Emma Stokes	620		
Independent	Stephen Selby	476		
Liberal Democrats	Jillian Haycock	399		
Turnout		2,218	35.5	+6.6
Conservative hold		Swing		
Conservative hold		Swing		

Bowbrook
Party	Candidate	Votes	%	±%
Liberal Democrats	Margaret Rowley	635	54.8	+3.8
Conservative	Christopher Hartwright	524	45.2	−3.8
Majority		111	9.6	+7.5
Turnout		1,159	54.3	+6.4
Liberal Democrats hold		Swing		

Bredon
Party	Candidate	Votes	%	±%
Conservative	Adrian Hardman	610	62.1	−1.4
Liberal Democrats	Matthew Darby	372	37.9	+9.5
Majority		238	24.2	−10.9
Turnout		982	49.6	+10.7
Conservative hold		Swing		

Bretforton and Offenham
Party	Candidate	Votes	%	±%
Liberal Democrats	Keith Wright	523	57.6	−9.4
Conservative	Jim Bulman	385	42.4	+9.4
Majority		138	15.2	−18.9
Turnout		908	45.9	+15.6
Liberal Democrats hold		Swing		

Broadway and Wickhamford (2 seats)
Party	Candidate	Votes	%	±%
Conservative	Liz Eyre	1,218		
Conservative	David Folkes	1,157		
Liberal Democrats	Carolyn Harford	408		
Turnout		2,783	44.0	+11.3
Conservative hold		Swing		
Conservative hold		Swing		

Dodderhill
Party	Candidate	Votes	%	±%
Conservative	Judy Pearce	527	68.5	−0.6
Liberal Democrats	Peter Evans	242	31.5	+0.6
Majority		285	37.1	−1.0
Turnout		769	40.7	+8.5
Conservative hold		Swing		

Drakes Broughton
Party	Candidate	Votes	%	±%
Conservative	Paul Middlebrough	636	77.3	+18.5
Liberal Democrats	Meldie Smith	187	22.7	−18.5
Majority		449	54.6	+37.0
Turnout		823	43.7	+6.2
Conservative hold		Swing		

Droitwich Central
Party	Candidate	Votes	%	±%
Liberal Democrats	Graham Gopsill	334	41.5	+4.1
Conservative	David Morris	249	31.0	+5.3
Labour	Eve Freer	221	27.5	−9.4
Majority		85	10.6	+10.1
Turnout		804	40.0	+9.8
Liberal Democrats hold		Swing		

Droitwich East (2 seats)
Party	Candidate	Votes	%	±%
Conservative	Mike Barratt	899		
Conservative	Pam Davey	859		
Labour	Sheila Neary	577		
Labour	Peter Pinfield	555		
Liberal Democrats	Ian Wild	408		
Turnout		3,298	40.9	+5.6
Conservative hold		Swing		
Conservative hold		Swing		

Droitwich South East (2 seats)
Party	Candidate	Votes	%	±%
Conservative	Richard Morris	1,158		
Conservative	Don Lawley	953		
Liberal Democrats	Stephanie Vale	503		
Independent	Ann Gopslll	403		
Turnout		3,017	42.2	+8.4
Conservative hold		Swing		
Conservative hold		Swing		

Droitwich South West (2 seats)
Party	Candidate	Votes	%	±%
Conservative	Yuleen Jewell	735		
Liberal Democrats	Wendy Carter	719		
Conservative	Maureen Lawley	698		
Liberal Democrats	Janet Clarke	690		
Green	Robert Burkett	290		
Turnout		3,132	42.4	+7.8
Conservative hold		Swing		
Liberal Democrats gain from Conservative		Swing		

Droitwich West (2 seats)
Party	Candidate	Votes	%	±%
Conservative	Lynne Duffy	585		
Conservative	Laurie Evans	553		
Labour	Roy Seabourne	538		
Labour	John Wrenn	492		
Turnout		2,168	29.7	+8.6
Conservative gain from Labour		Swing		
Conservative gain from Labour		Swing		

Eckington
Party	Candidate	Votes	%	±%
Conservative	Ron Davis	730	61.9	+2.8
Liberal Democrats	Brenda Sheridan	449	38.1	+10.8
Majority		281	23.8	−8.0
Turnout		1,179	53.3	+14.3
Conservative hold		Swing		

Elmley Castle and Somerville
Party	Candidate	Votes	%	±%
Conservative	Anna Mackison	705	72.4	+10.1
Liberal Democrats	Garth Raymer	269	27.6	−10.1
Majority		436	44.8	+20.2
Turnout		974	49.9	+4.8
Conservative hold		Swing		

Evesham North (2 seats)
Party	Candidate	Votes	%	±%
Conservative	Jo Sandalls	660		
Conservative	Roma Kirke	612		
Liberal Democrats	Jeffrey Butler	415		
Independent	Paul Rencher	341		
Turnout		2,028	33.3	+5.2
Conservative hold		Swing		
Conservative hold		Swing		

Evesham South (2 seats)
Party	Candidate	Votes	%	±%
Conservative	Ronald Cartwright	676		
Conservative	Bob Banks	591		
UKIP	John White	334		
Liberal Democrats	Barbara Browne	312		
Turnout		1,913	29.2	+6.3
Conservative hold		Swing		
Conservative hold		Swing		

Fladbury
Party	Candidate	Votes	%	±%
Conservative	Tom McDonald	801	72.2	+22.9
Liberal Democrats	Diana Brown	308	27.8	−15.3
Majority		493	44.5	+41.3
Turnout		1,109	50.6	−1.4
Conservative hold		Swing		

Great Hampton
Party	Candidate	Votes	%	±%
Conservative	John Smith	504	64.2	−4.2
Liberal Democrats	Carol Kershaw	281	35.8	+4.2
Majority		223	28.4	−8.4
Turnout		785	39.1	+9.3
Conservative hold		Swing		

Hartlebury
Party	Candidate	Votes	%	±%
Conservative	Muriel Mathews	566	74.7	−2.4
Liberal Democrats	Martin Moran	192	25.3	+25.3
Majority		374	49.3	−5.0
Turnout		758	35.9	+9.9
Conservative hold		Swing		

Havington and Norton
Party	Candidate	Votes	%	±%
Conservative	Clive Holt	637	73.2	+14.5
Liberal Democrats	Helen Martin	233	26.8	−14.5
Majority		404	46.4	+29.0
Turnout		870	44.0	+8.6
Conservative hold		Swing		

Honeybourne and Pebworth
Party	Candidate	Votes	%	±%
Conservative	Patrick Haycock	512	54.1	+30.7
Liberal Democrats	Thomas Bean	434	45.9	−1.7
Majority		78	8.2	
Turnout		946	50.5	+17.9
Conservative gain from Liberal Democrats		Swing		

Inkberrow (2 seats)
Party	Candidate	Votes	%	±%
Conservative	Audrey Steel	1,677		
Conservative	David Lee	1,485		
Liberal Democrats	Helen Wilkes	593		
Labour	Susan Hayman	270		
Turnout		4,025	51.2	+9.9
Conservative hold		Swing		
Conservative hold		Swing		

Little Hampton (2 seats)
Party	Candidate	Votes	%	±%
Conservative	Andrew Dyke	677		
Conservative	Wendy Dyke	557		
Liberal Democrats	John Payne	460		
Turnout		1,694	28.4	+6.9
Conservative hold		Swing		
Conservative gain from Liberal Democrats		Swing		

Lovett and North Claines (2 seats)
Party	Candidate	Votes	%	±%
Conservative	Paul Coley	1,357		
Conservative	Alan Fisher	1,205		
Liberal Democrats	Janet Saunders	576		
Labour	Christopher Barton	249		
Turnout		3,387	45.2	+9.4
Conservative hold		Swing		
Conservative hold		Swing		

Norton and Whittington
Party	Candidate	Votes	%	±%
Conservative	Rob Adams	609	72.2	
Liberal Democrats	Hal Arksey	234	27.8	
Majority		375	44.5	
Turnout		843	39.0	
Conservative hold		Swing		

Ombersley
Party	Candidate	Votes	%	±%
Conservative	Jean Dowty	684	83.0	+2.4
Liberal Democrats	Joe Moran	140	17.0	−2.4
Majority		544	66.0	+4.9
Turnout		824	46.2	+9.7
Conservative hold		Swing		

Pershore (3 seats)
Party	Candidate	Votes	%	±%
Liberal Democrats	Gaynor Amphlett	1,128		
Liberal Democrats	Charles Tucker	1,020		
Liberal Democrats	John Grantham	999		
Conservative	Raymond Steadman	855		
Conservative	Val Wood	840		
Conservative	Suzanne Marler	601		
Independent	Jane Daniels	546		
Independent	Christopher Parsons	477		
Green	David Shaw	444		
Independent	Daniel Casey	339		
Independent	Kenneth Rowe	152		
Turnout		7,401	45.2	+8.9
Liberal Democrats hold		Swing		
Liberal Democrats hold		Swing		
Liberal Democrats hold		Swing		

Pinvin
Party	Candidate	Votes	%	±%
Liberal Democrats	Liz Tucker	unopposed		
Liberal Democrats hold		Swing		

South Bredon Hill
Party	Candidate	Votes	%	±%
Liberal Democrats	Adrian Darby	681	64.1	+6.8
Conservative	Beverley Hardman	381	35.9	−2.1
Majority		300	28.2	+8.9
Turnout		1,062	55.4	+4.8
Liberal Democrats hold		Swing		

The Littletons
Party	Candidate	Votes	%	±%
Liberal Democrats	Alan Anderson	390	35.4	−4.6
Independent	Richard Lasota	385	35.0	+35.0
Conservative	Mary Smith	326	29.6	−30.4
Majority		5	0.5	
Turnout		1,101	50.0	+9.5
Liberal Democrats gain from Conservative		Swing		

Upton Snodsbury
Party	Candidate	Votes	%	±%
Conservative	Linda Robinson	700	57.2	+8.1
Liberal Democrats	Mark Broughton-Taylor	524	42.8	−8.1
Majority		176	14.4	
Turnout		1,224	57.7	+1.9
Conservative gain from Liberal Democrats		Swing		

== By-elections between 2007 and 2011 ==
=== Lovett and North Claines ===
A by-election was held in Lovett and North Claines on 13 December 2007 after the death of Conservative councillor Paul Coley. The seat was held for the Conservatives by Tony Miller with a majority of 495 votes over Liberal Democrat John Garbett.

Lovett and North Claines by-election 13 December 2007
Party	Candidate	Votes	%	±%
Conservative	Tony Miller	837	71.0	+8.8
Liberal Democrats	John Garbett	342	29.0	+2.6
Majority		495	42.0	
Turnout		1,179	27.9	−17.3
Conservative hold		Swing		

=== Droitwich Central ===
A by-election was held in Droitwich Central on 16 July 2009 after the death of Liberal Democrat councillor Graham Gopsill. The seat was held for the Liberal Democrats by his widow Ann Gopsill with a majority of 10 votes over Conservative David Morris.

Droitwich Central by-election 16 July 2009
Party	Candidate	Votes	%	±%
Liberal Democrats	Ann Gopsill	233	51.1	+9.6
Conservative	David Morris	223	48.9	+17.9
Majority		10	2.2	−8.4
Turnout		456	22.8	−17.2
Liberal Democrats hold		Swing		

=== Droitwich South West ===
A by-election was held in Droitwich South West on 1 October 2009 after Conservative councillor Yuleen Jewell resigned from the council. The seat was gained for the Liberal Democrats by Stephanie Vale with a majority of 105 votes over Conservative Maureen Lawley.

Droitwich South West by-election 1 October 2009
Party	Candidate	Votes	%	±%
Liberal Democrats	Stephanie Vale	521	47.4	+6.1
Conservative	Maureen Lawley	416	37.8	−4.3
Labour	Paul Richards	163	14.8	+14.8
Majority		105	9.5	
Turnout		1,100	27.6	−14.8
Liberal Democrats gain from Conservative		Swing		

=== Evesham South ===
A by-election was held in Evesham South on 18 February 2010 after the death of Conservative councillor Ron Cartwright. The seat was held for the Conservatives by Gerard O'Donnell with a majority of 182 votes over Liberal Democrat Diana Brown.

Evesham South by-election 18 February 2010
Party	Candidate	Votes	%	±%
Conservative	Gerard O'Donnell	358	52.3	+1.2
Liberal Democrats	Diana Brown	176	25.7	+2.1
UKIP	John White	150	21.9	−3.3
Majority		182	26.6	
Turnout		684	16.3	−12.9
Conservative hold		Swing		
