= 2011 Wychavon District Council election =

2011 UK local government election

Map of the results of the 2011 Wychavon District Council election. Conservatives in blue, Liberal Democrats in yellow and Labour in red.

The 2011 Wychavon District Council election took place on 5 May 2011 to elect members of Wychavon District Council in Worcestershire, England. The whole council was up for election and the Conservative Party stayed in overall control of the council.

== Background ==
After the last election in 2007 the Conservatives controlled the council with 35 councillors, compared to 10 for the Liberal Democrats. By October 2009, the Liberal Democrats gained a seat from the Conservatives at a by-election in Droitwich South West.

In 2011, 12 candidates, 11 Conservatives and one Liberal Democrat, were elected without opposition, while in Elmley Castle and Somerville the election was delayed after no candidates were nominated for that ward.

== Election result ==
The Conservatives increased their majority on the council, making a net gain of five seats to have 38 councillors after the May election. The Conservative gains came at the expense of the Liberal Democrats, who dropped to 5 seats on the council after losing six seats to the Conservatives. These losses including losing all three seats the Liberal Democrats had held in Droitwich, as well as two seats in Pershore and one seat in The Littletons.

Meanwhile, Labour regained a seat on the council after having lost all of their seats in 2007. The Labour gain came in Droitwich West, where Peter Pinfield was returned to the council defeating Conservative councillor Laurie Evans. Overall turnout at the election was 46.95%.

Wychavon local election result 2011
Party	Seats	Gains	Losses	Net gain/loss	Seats %	Votes %	Votes	+/−
Conservative	39	6	1	+5	86.7	58.8	27,349	-0.2%
Liberal Democrats	5	0	6	-6	11.1	22.1	10,290	-5.9%
Labour	1	1	0	+1	2.2	10.4	4,819	+5.1%
Independent	0	0	0	0	0	6.7	3,115	+0.9%
Green	0	0	0	0	0	2.0	935	+0.7%

The above totals include the delayed election in Elmley Castle and Somerville on 23 June 2011.

== Ward results ==
Badsey
Party	Candidate	Votes	%	±%
Conservative	Reginald Jakeman	488	51.2	+0.1
Independent	Mary Campbell	465	48.8	+43.4
Majority		23	2.4	−5.3
Turnout		953	44.9	+6.5
Conservative hold		Swing		

Bengeworth (2 seats)
Party	Candidate	Votes	%	±%
Conservative	James Bulman	665		
Conservative	Emma Stokes	661		
Independent	Albert Booth	477		
Labour	Frederick Kaler	338		
Liberal Democrats	Paul Rencher	286		
Turnout		2,427	39.4	+3.9
Conservative hold		Swing		
Conservative hold		Swing		

Bowbrook
Party	Candidate	Votes	%	±%
Liberal Democrats	Alexandra Rowley	750	59.5	+4.7
Conservative	David Greenwood	510	40.5	−4.7
Majority		240	19.0	+9.4
Turnout		1,260	58.0	+3.7
Liberal Democrats hold		Swing		

Bredon
Party	Candidate	Votes	%	±%
Conservative	Adrian Hardman	unopposed		
Conservative hold		Swing		

Bretforton and Offenham
Party	Candidate	Votes	%	±%
Liberal Democrats	Keith Wright	536	53.4	−4.2
Conservative	Mary Smith	468	46.6	+4.2
Majority		68	6.8	−8.4
Turnout		1,004	50.0	+4.1
Liberal Democrats hold		Swing		

Broadway and Wickhamford (2 seats)
Party	Candidate	Votes	%	±%
Conservative	Elizabeth Eyre	unopposed		
Conservative	Barrie Parmenter	unopposed		
Conservative hold		Swing		
Conservative hold		Swing		

Dodderhill
Party	Candidate	Votes	%	±%
Conservative	Judith Pearce	542	72.8	+4.3
Liberal Democrats	Peter Evans	203	27.2	−4.3
Majority		339	45.5	+8.4
Turnout		745	39.1	−1.6
Conservative hold		Swing		

Drakes Broughton
Party	Candidate	Votes	%	±%
Conservative	Paul Middlebrough	675	73.8	−3.5
Liberal Democrats	Imelda Carlton Smith	240	26.2	+3.5
Majority		435	47.5	−7.1
Turnout		915	49.3	+5.6
Conservative hold		Swing		

Droitwich Central
Party	Candidate	Votes	%	±%
Conservative	Glenise Noyes	359	43.4	+12.4
Labour	Sheila Seabourne	289	34.9	+7.4
Liberal Democrats	Rebecca Littlechild	180	21.7	−19.8
Majority		70	8.5	
Turnout		828	42.0	+2.0
Conservative gain from Liberal Democrats		Swing		

Droitwich East (2 seats)
Party	Candidate	Votes	%	±%
Conservative	Michael Barratt	1,033		
Conservative	Gordon Brookes	998		
Labour	Sheila Neary	585		
Labour	Patricia Pinfield	538		
Liberal Democrats	David Rowe	343		
Turnout		3,497	44.7	+3.8
Conservative hold		Swing		
Conservative hold		Swing		

Droitwich South East (2 seats)
Party	Candidate	Votes	%	±%
Conservative	Richard Morris	1,342		
Conservative	Kenneth Jennings	1,236		
Labour	Bill Baker	375		
Labour	Colin Beardwood	368		
Liberal Democrats	Tracey Hall	245		
Liberal Democrats	John Littlechild	237		
Turnout		3,803	51.8	+9.6
Conservative hold		Swing		
Conservative hold		Swing		

Droitwich South West (2 seats)
Party	Candidate	Votes	%	±%
Conservative	Robert Beale	846		
Conservative	Thomas Noyes	805		
Labour	Christopher Barton	486		
Labour	Sylvia Meyrick	461		
Liberal Democrats	Wendy Carter	448		
Liberal Democrats	Robert Crawford	339		
Turnout		3,385	45.8	+3.4
Conservative gain from Liberal Democrats		Swing		
Conservative gain from Liberal Democrats		Swing		

Droitwich West (2 seats)
Party	Candidate	Votes	%	±%
Conservative	Lynne Duffy	679		
Labour	Peter Pinfield	622		
Conservative	Laurence Evans	587		
Labour	Roy Seabourne	571		
Turnout		2,459	34.2	+4.5
Conservative hold		Swing		
Labour gain from Conservative		Swing		

Eckington
Party	Candidate	Votes	%	±%
Conservative	Ronald Davis	848	63.5	+1.6
Independent	Paul Ellis-Gormley	302	22.6	+22.6
Labour	Susan Hayman	186	13.9	+13.9
Majority		546	40.9	+12.1
Turnout		1,336	60.0	+6.7
Conservative hold		Swing		

Evesham North (2 seats)
Party	Candidate	Votes	%	±%
Conservative	Josephine Sandalls	663		
Conservative	Frances Smith	609		
Green	Gordon Matthews	339		
Liberal Democrats	Julie Haines	275		
Liberal Democrats	Timothy Haines	218		
Turnout		2,104	34.3	+1.0
Conservative hold		Swing		
Conservative hold		Swing		

Evesham South (2 seats)
Party	Candidate	Votes	%	±%
Conservative	Robert Banks	unopposed		
Conservative	Gerard O'Donnell	unopposed		
Conservative hold		Swing		
Conservative hold		Swing		

Fladbury
Party	Candidate	Votes	%	±%
Conservative	Thomas McDonald	943	77.7	+5.5
Liberal Democrats	Diana Brown	270	22.3	−5.5
Majority		673	55.5	+11.0
Turnout		1,213	56.2	+5.6
Conservative hold		Swing		

Great Hampton
Party	Candidate	Votes	%	±%
Conservative	John Smith	unopposed		
Conservative hold		Swing		

Hartlebury
Party	Candidate	Votes	%	±%
Conservative	Nigel Dowty	unopposed		
Conservative hold		Swing		

Harvington and Norton
Party	Candidate	Votes	%	±%
Conservative	Charles Homer	unopposed		
Conservative hold		Swing		

Honeybourne and Pebworth
Party	Candidate	Votes	%	±%
Conservative	Alastair Adams	649	66.5	+12.4
Liberal Democrats	Thomas Bean	327	33.5	−12.4
Majority		322	33.0	+24.8
Turnout		976	51.9	+1.4
Conservative hold		Swing		

Inkberrow (2 seats)
Party	Candidate	Votes	%	±%
Conservative	Audrey Steel	1,798		
Conservative	David Lee	1,431		
Independent	David Powis	897		
Turnout		4,126	57.1	+5.9
Conservative hold		Swing		
Conservative hold		Swing		

Little Hampton (2 seats)
Party	Candidate	Votes	%	±%
Conservative	Andrew Dyke	803		
Conservative	Wendy Dyke	725		
Liberal Democrats	John Payne	474		
Turnout		2,002	34.6	+6.2
Conservative hold		Swing		
Conservative hold		Swing		

Lovett and North Claines (2 seats)
Party	Candidate	Votes	%	±%
Conservative	Anthony Miller	1,475		
Conservative	Alan Fisher	1,115		
Liberal Democrats	Janet Saunders	555		
Turnout		3,145	49.2	+4.0
Conservative hold		Swing		
Conservative hold		Swing		

Norton and Whittington
Party	Candidate	Votes	%	±%
Conservative	Robert Adams	unopposed		
Conservative hold		Swing		

Ombersley
Party	Candidate	Votes	%	±%
Conservative	Robert Tomlinson	unopposed		
Conservative hold		Swing		

Pershore (3 seats)
Party	Candidate	Votes	%	±%
Conservative	Valerie Wood	1,209		
Liberal Democrats	Charles Tucker	1,163		
Conservative	David Brotheridge	1,026		
Independent	Christopher Parsons	974		
Liberal Democrats	Jayne Lewis	930		
Conservative	Stephen Gowenlock	752		
Liberal Democrats	Derrick Watt	701		
Green	David Shaw	596		
Turnout		7,351	49.5	+4.3
Conservative gain from Liberal Democrats		Swing		
Liberal Democrats hold		Swing		
Conservative gain from Liberal Democrats		Swing		

Pinvin
Party	Candidate	Votes	%	±%
Liberal Democrats	Elizabeth Tucker	872	70.9	
Conservative	Maureen Lawley	358	29.1	
Majority		514	41.8	
Turnout		1,230	55.4	
Liberal Democrats hold		Swing		

South Bredon Hill
Party	Candidate	Votes	%	±%
Liberal Democrats	Adrian Darby	unopposed		
Liberal Democrats hold		Swing		

The Littletons
Party	Candidate	Votes	%	±%
Conservative	Richard Lasota	616	55.1	+25.5
Liberal Democrats	Alan Duffy	501	44.9	+9.5
Majority		115	10.2	
Turnout		1,117	52.3	+2.3
Conservative gain from Liberal Democrats		Swing		

Upton Snodsbury
Party	Candidate	Votes	%	±%
Conservative	Linda Robinson	unopposed		
Conservative hold		Swing		

=== Elmley Castle and Somerville delayed election ===
The election in Elmley Castle and Somerville was delayed until 23 June 2011 after no candidates were nominated originally. This came after the previous Conservative councillor Anna Mackison died in March 2011. The seat was held for the Conservatives by Roma Kirke with a 238-vote majority over Liberal Democrat Jayne Lewis.

Elmley Castle and Somerville
Party	Candidate	Votes	%	±%
Conservative	Roma Kirke	435	68.8	−3.6
Liberal Democrats	Jayne Lewis	197	31.2	+3.6
Majority		238	37.6	
Turnout		632	32.6	
Conservative hold		Swing		

== By-elections between 2011 and 2015 ==
A by-election was held in Fladbury on 22 May 2014 after the death of Conservative councillor Tom McDonald. The seat was held for the Conservatives by Bradley Thomas with a majority of 137 votes over Liberal Democrat candidate Diana Brown.

Fladbury by-election 22 May 2014
Party	Candidate	Votes	%	±%
Conservative	Bradley Thomas	456	45.2	−32.5
Liberal Democrats	Diana Brown	319	31.6	+9.3
UKIP	Neil Whelan	234	23.2	+23.2
Majority		137	13.6	−41.9
Turnout		1,009	46.2	−10.0
Conservative hold		Swing		
