= Norton Halt railway station =

Former railway station in England

Norton Halt

General information
- Location: Norton, Worcestershire; England
- Coordinates: 52.1576°N 2.1740°W
- Grid reference: SO882510
- Platforms: 2

Other information
- Status: Disused

History
- Original company: Oxford, Worcester and Wolverhampton Railway
- Pre-grouping: Great Western Railway
- Post-grouping: Great Western Railway

Key dates
- 1879: Opened
- 3 January 1966: Closed
Location

Norton Halt railway station was a station in Norton, Worcestershire, England. The station was opened in 1879 and closed in 1966.

Preceding station	Disused railways	Following station
Worcester Shrub Hill; Line and station open	Great Western Railway; Oxford, Worcester and Wolverhampton Railway	Stoulton; Line open, station closed
