= Wadborough =

Village in Worcestershire, England

Coordinates: 52.127°N 2.139°W

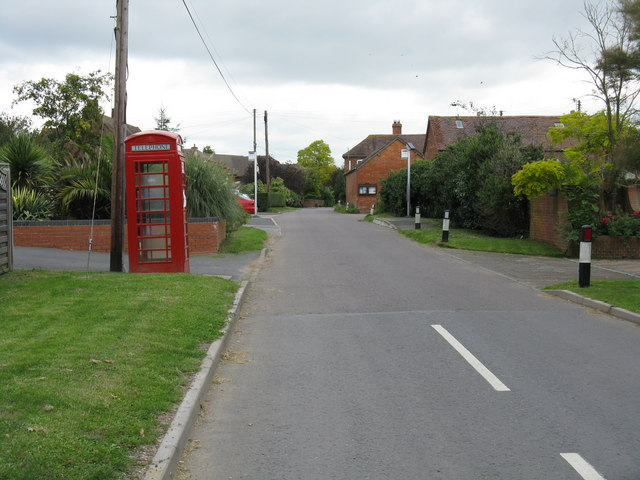
- Wadborough village

- Location within Worcestershire
- OS grid reference: SO849548
- Civil parish: Drakes Broughton and Wadborough
- District: Wychavon
- Shire county: Worcestershire
- Region: West Midlands
- Country: England
- Sovereign state: United Kingdom
- Post town: WORCESTER
- Postcode district: WR8
- Dialling code: 01905
- Police: West Mercia
- Fire: Hereford and Worcester
- Ambulance: West Midlands
- UK Parliament: Droitwich and Evesham

Wadborough is a small village 2 miles outside Pershore and 7 miles from Worcester. The village is in Worcestershire, England, and forms the civil parish of Drakes Broughton and Wadborough with its neighbouring village, Drakes Broughton. The village is an old farming community, with its nearest church a mile away in Pirton.

In the 2021 census the parish of Drakes Broughton and Wadborough recorded a population of 2,145. Wadborough itself has approximately 200 inhabitants. Wadborough has one public house, the Mason's Arms. The village has one bus service, the 382, which runs between Pershore and Worcester, once an hour in both directions.

== History ==
Wadborough is first mentioned in the 10th century when Edgar, King of England confirmed that four manses (priests’ houses) there belonged to Pershore Abbey. The Abbey owned most of the land in the area. Place-names like Abbottswood and Hermitage Farm reflect a long church ownership. Wadborough appears in the Domesday Book of 1086 as Wadberge, meaning Old English wad "woad" beorg "hill". Woad dye production was usually carried out at some distance from towns (Wadborough is about four miles from Pershore) because of the offensive smells produced.

Wadborough railway station was situated west of the village on the Bristol to Birmingham main rail line. The line remains open and high-speed trains regularly pass through, but the station closed in January 1965.
