= Hawbridge =

Village in Worcestershire, England

Coordinates: 52.140988°N 2.13859°W

- Location within Worcestershire
- District: Wychavon
- Shire county: Worcestershire
- Region: West Midlands
- Country: England
- Sovereign state: United Kingdom
- Police: West Mercia
- Fire: Hereford and Worcester
- Ambulance: West Midlands

Hawbridge is a village in Worcestershire, England.

Hawbridge House is one of the original dwellings within the village. Another notable building is Feli's bar and restaurant, which serves Italian food. To the west of the B4084 is Claverton council estate.

The settlement is served by the X50 bus service, which runs from nearby Evesham to Worcester.
