= Drakes Broughton =

Coordinates: 52.133821°N 2.109466°W

- Village
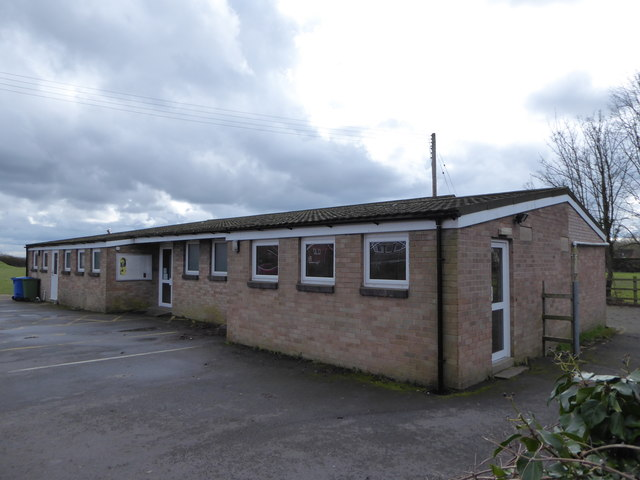
- Drakes Broughton village hall in 2016

- Location within Worcestershire
- OS grid reference: SO9248
  - London: 111 miles
- Civil parish: Drakes Broughton and Wadborough
- District: Wychavon
- Shire county: Worcestershire
- Region: West Midlands
- Country: England
- Sovereign state: United Kingdom
- Post town: Pershore
- Postcode district: WR10
- Dialling code: 01905

Drakes Broughton is a village in Worcestershire, England. The village is located on the B4084 road (previously the A44) 2 miles north-west of Pershore and 7 miles south-east of Worcester. It forms the civil parish of Drakes Broughton and Wadborough with its neighbouring village, Wadborough. In 2021, the parish of Drakes Broughton and Wadborough recorded a population of 2,145.

The village has two pubs; the Old Oak and the Plough and Harrow. Its school, St Barnabas, contains a Pre-School, First School and a Middle School, which then feeds into Pershore High School in nearby Pershore. Drakes Broughton has a recreation ground, on which the village's football teams play. The recreation ground is situated next to the village's church, St Barnabas School, and the village hall. Drakes Broughton has other amenities including a general store, hairdressers, and a fish and chip shop.

The village gave its name to an early composition by Edward Elgar, written in about 1878, a hymn tune with words by Francis Stanfield (1835–1914).
