= List of works by Francis Skeat =

This is a list of works by Francis Skeat (1909–2000), an English glass painter who created over 400 stained glass windows in churches and cathedrals, both in England and overseas.

County/Country	Town/village	Church	Location	Date	Subject	Reference	Picture
Berkshire	Midgham	St. Matthew	51°24′3.1″N 1°12′7.9″W	1959	Noli me tangere		
Berkshire	Pangbourne	St. James the Less	51°28′59.5″N 1°5′16.8″W	1956	St. James the Less, St. Cecilia		
Cambridgeshire	Helpston	St. Botolph	52°38′9.2″N 0°20′36.6″W	1983	Christ in Majesty		
Cambridgeshire	Swavesey	St. Andrew	52°18′20.3″N 0°0′9.4″W	1967	Tree of Jesse		
Cambridgeshire	Swavesey	St. Andrew	52°18′20.3″N 0°0′9.4″W	1930s	Alpha and Omega		
Cornwall	St. Mawes	St. Mawes	50°9′28.4″N 5°1′2.6″W	1960	St. Mawes – missionary		
Cornwall	St. Mawes	St. Mawes	50°9′28.4″N 5°1′2.6″W	1960	St. Mawes – abbot		
Cornwall	St. Mawes	St. Mawes	50°9′28.4″N 5°1′2.6″W	1960	St. Mawes – teacher		
Cornwall	Cardinham	St. Meubred	50°29′16.4″N 4°38′51″W		St. Francis of Assisi		
Derbyshire	Ashford-in-the-Water	Holy Trinity	53°13′26.8″N 1°42′34.2″W	1960	Virgin and child		
Derbyshire	Chesterfield	St. Mary and All Saints	53°14′10″N 1°25′27″W	1959	Hagar and Ishmael		
Derbyshire	Chesterfield	St. Mary and All Saints	53°14′10″N 1°25′27″W	1959	Elisha and his servant		
Derbyshire	Chesterfield	St. Mary and All Saints	53°14′10″N 1°25′27″W	1959	Manoah and his son Samson		
East Sussex	Hadlow Down	St. Mark the Evangelist	50°59′48.1″N 0°10′43.3″E	1948	Christian year in wild flowers		
Essex	Eastwood	St. Laurence and All Saints	51°34′3.5″N 0°41′5.3″E	1978	Samuel Purchas		
Essex	Frinton-on-Sea	St. Mary Magdalen	51°49′55.7″N 1°14′36.6″E	1969			
Essex	Hadleigh	St. Barnabas	51°33′3.6″N 0°37′20.3″E	1964	Virgin and Child "Behold, the handmaid of the Lord"		
Essex	Kelvedon Hatch	St. Nicholas	51°40′3.4″N 0°16′1.6″E	1966			
Essex	Stanford Rivers	St. Margaret	51°41′8.5″N 0°13′3.7″E	1952	Jesus, St. Margaret of Scotland, St. Wulstan		
Essex	Thorpe Bay	St. Augustine	51°31′56.3″N 0°45′41.4″E	1958	Christ adored by the Heavenly host		
Essex	Westcliff-on-Sea	St. Michael & All Angels	51°32′35.2″N 0°40′11.3″E	1969	Epiphany		
Greater London	Bush Hill Park	St. Stephen	51°38′30.1″N 0°4′42.6″W	1955	Boy Scouts and Girl Guides		
Greater London	Bush Hill Park	St. Stephen	51°38′30.1″N 0°4′42.6″W	1957	Dorcas		
Greater London	Bush Hill Park	St. Stephen	51°38′30.1″N 0°4′42.6″W	1957	St. Barnabas		
Greater London	Bush Hill Park	St. Stephen	51°38′30.1″N 0°4′42.6″W	1979	St. Thomas		
Greater London	Chelsea	Chelsea and Westminster Hospital	51°29′2.4″N 0°10′55.2″W	1982	Westminster Hospital		
Greater London	City of London	St. Sepulchre-without-Newgate	51°31′0.1″N 0°6′8.5″W	1968	Capt. John Smith memorial window		Susan Constant - detail from stained glass window in St Sepulchre-without-Newgate
Greater London	Ealing Common	All Saints	51°30′25.5″N 0°17′43.0″W	1957	"P.S. Duckworth" (ship) and Shield of Faith		
Greater London	East Sheen	Christ Church	51°27′36.7″N 0°16′30″W	1954	Madonna and child		
Greater London	Eltham Park	St. Luke	51°27′37.8″N 0°3′29.6″E	1958	Stylised cross & symbols		
Greater London	Norbury	St. Philip	51°24′17.3″N 0°7′31.1″W	1945	Angels		
Greater London	Norbury	St. Philip	51°24′17.3″N 0°7′31.1″W	1937	Christ in Majesty		
Greater London	Norbury	St. Philip	51°24′17.3″N 0°7′31.1″W	1937	Madonna and child		
Greater London	Stoke Newington	St. Mary (New Church)	51°33′39.6″N 0°5′4.2″W	1958	Soldiers guarding tomb of Jesus		
Greater London	Stoke Newington	St. Mary (New Church)	51°33′39.6″N 0°5′4.2″W	1958	Noli me tangere		
Greater London	Stoke Newington	St. Mary (New Church)	51°33′39.6″N 0°5′4.2″W	1958	The Stable at Bethlehem		
Greater London	Upper Clapton	St. Thomas the Apostle	51°34′11.2″N 0°3′51.5″W	1961	St. Eanswith, St. Richard		
Greater London	Westminster	Westminster Abbey	51°29′56.9″N 0°7′38.6″W	1988	St. Francis of Assisi (Rev. Robinson Duckworth memorial window)		
Greater Manchester	New Bury	St. James	53°32′32.3″N 2°24′43.9″W	1965	Nativity		
Hampshire	Boldre	St. John the Baptist	50°47′32.6″N 1°32′31.9″W	1956	Badges		
Hampshire	Ecchinswell	St. Lawrence	51°20′9.2″N 1°16′55.2″W	1979	Ploughman		
Hampshire	Longparish	St. Nicholas	51°11′34.1″N 1°23′32.0″W	1967	St. Michael above aviation scene (Maj. Lanoe Hawker memorial window)		
Hampshire	Petersfield	St. Peter	51°0′11.5″N 0°56′14.2″W	1955	St. Monica		
Hampshire	Petersfield	St. Peter	51°0′11.5″N 0°56′14.2″W	after 1967	Jesus Christ Saviour		
Hampshire	Portsmouth	Portsmouth Cathedral	50°47′25.3″N 1°6′16.0″W	1954–55	Symbols		
Hampshire	Portsmouth	Portsmouth Cathedral	50°47′25.3″N 1°6′16.0″W	1954–55	Small roundel scenes		
Hampshire	Romsey	Romsey Abbey	50°59′23.0″N 1°30′5.0″W	1962	St. Swithun		
Hampshire	Southampton	St. Michael and All Angels	50°56′40.7″N 1°24′19.1″W	1962	Archangel Michael defeating Satan		
Hampshire	Titchfield	St. Peter	50°50′56.7″N 1°13′59.2″W	1959	Farmer ploughing		
Hertfordshire	Berkhamsted	St. Peter	51°45′42.4″N 0°34′27.5″W	1956	Christ resurrected		
Hertfordshire	Chipperfield	St. Paul	51°42′10.4″N 0°29′30.3″W	1948	St. John; St. David		
Hertfordshire	Chipperfield	St. Paul	51°42′10.4″N 0°29′30.3″W	1957	St. Paul		
Hertfordshire	Hertford Heath	Haileybury College chapel	51°46′42.8″N 0°1′59.2″W	1956	Christ in Judgement		
Hertfordshire	St. Albans	St. Peter	51°45′19.4″N 0°20′6″W	1934	The Good Shepherd, St. John the Baptist		
Isle of Wight	Lake	Church of the Good Shepherd	50°38′47″N 1°10′6″W		Christ as the Good Shepherd flanked by David as Shepherd boy and king		
Isle of Wight	Ryde	Holy Trinity	50°43′41.2″N 1°9′28.8″W		(S. Chapel E. Window)		
Kent	Crockham Hill	Holy Trinity	51°14′14.6″N 0°4′2.1″E	1951	St. Margaret of Scotland, St. Cecilia		
Kent	Hadlow	St. Mary	51°13′23.9″N 0°20′22.2″E	1956	The Visitation		
Lincolnshire	Old Clee	The Holy Trinity	53°33′24.5″N 0°3′15.6″W	1960	Bishop St Hugh of Lincoln		
Northamptonshire	Earls Barton	All Saints	52°15′57″N 0°45′12″W	After 1980	"A City set on a hill cannot be hid" (Sermon on the Mount)		
Northamptonshire	Earls Barton	All Saints	52°15′57″N 0°45′12″W		"Let no man despise thy youth..." (First Epistle to Timothy)		
Northamptonshire	Raunds	St. Peter	52°20′48.2″N 0°31′59.8″W	1954	St. Peter, the Virgin, and St. Crispin		
Northamptonshire	Raunds	St. Peter	52°20′48.2″N 0°31′59.8″W	1960	Feeding the 5,000		
Northamptonshire	Raunds	St. Peter	52°20′48.2″N 0°31′59.8″W	1981	Christ appearing to St. Peter		
North Yorkshire	Hubberholme	St. Michael and All Angels	54°12′0″N 2°6′52.8″W				
Shropshire	Chetwynd	St. Michael and All Angels	52°47′19.3″N 2°23′36.6″W	1963	(Nave NE & SE)		
Shropshire	Clungunford	St. Cuthbert	52°24′11.5″N 2°53′27.6″W	1970	Sheep farming: "Without the way, there is no going"		
Suffolk	East Bergholt	St. Mary the Virgin	51°58′11.6″N 1°0′45″E	1930s	Virgin and Child		
Suffolk	Chelmondiston	St. Andrew	51°59′26.7″N 1°12′37.4″E	1961	Crucifixion		
Suffolk	Chelmondiston	St. Andrew	51°59′26.7″N 1°12′37.4″E	1960s	Summoning of St. Andrew by Christ		
Suffolk	Chelmondiston	St. Andrew	51°59′26.7″N 1°12′37.4″E	1960s	St. Luke healing a child		
Suffolk	Chelmondiston	St. Andrew	51°59′26.7″N 1°12′37.4″E	1960s	The Three Marys		
Suffolk	Laxfield	All Saints	52°18′7.2″N 1°21′59.4″E	1938	Crucifixion		
Surrey	Farnham	St. Thomas-on-the-Bourne	51°12′10.8″N 0°47′31.2″W	1977	St. Francis		
Surrey	Hindhead	St. Alban	51°7′26.8″N 0°44′38.4″W	1950	St. Monica, Edward Talbot ("Prayer")		
Surrey	Laleham	All Saints	51°24′33.1″N 0°29′24″W	1947	St. Nicholas, St. Thomas		
Surrey	Mickleham	St. Michael	51°16′3″N 0°19′24.6″W	1965	Arms of Baron Beaverbrook		
Surrey	West Clandon	St. Peter & St. Paul	51°15′2.9″N 0°30′18″W	1964	The Annunciation		
West Midlands	Dudley	St. Francis	52°31′2.1″N 2°5′26.7″W	1961	Duncan Edwards memorial window		
West Sussex	Donnington	St. George	50°48′47.7″N 0°47′29.9″W	1958	Madonna and child		
West Sussex	Fishbourne	St. Peter & St. Mary	50°50′1.1″N 0°48′18.4″W	1952	Jesus restores sight to blind beggar		Window above west door at St Peter & St Paul, Fishbourne
West Sussex	Lurgashall	St. Laurence	51°2′13.9″N 0°39′48.2″W	1966	Christ blessing children		
West Sussex	West Green	St. Peter	51°6′54″N 0°11′44.2″W	1956	Blessed Virgin Mary with Joseph & boy Jesus		
West Sussex	West Green	St. Peter	51°6′54″N 0°11′44.2″W	1952	St. George, St. Michael		
West Sussex	West Itchenor	St. Nicholas	50°47′59.6″N 0°51′59.4″W	1965	Badges		Window in north nave of St Nicholas Church
West Yorkshire	Woodhouse Hill	Christ Church	53°40′3″N 1°46′10.2″W	After 1962	"Man shall not live by bread alone" (Gospel of Matthew 4:4)		
Worcestershire	Belbroughton	Holy Trinity	52°23′23.3″N 2°7′12.7″W	1965			
Worcestershire	Beoley	St. Leonard	52°19′29.6″N 1°54′20.9″W	1965	Adoration of the Magi		
Worcestershire	Broughton Hackett	St. Leonard	52°11′22.5″N 2°6′44.3″W	1965	Jesus Christ "I am with you always."		
Worcestershire	Evesham	St. Lawrence	52°5′29.0″N 1°56′51.4″W	1959	Nativity		
Worcestershire	Hagley	St. Saviour	52°25′21″N 2°8′31.2″W	1962	Blessed Virgin, St. Gabriel, Christ in Majesty, St. Michael, St. John the Baptist		
Worcestershire	Hagley	St. Saviour	52°25′21″N 2°8′31.2″W	1964	St. Cecilia		
Worcestershire	Hagley	St. Saviour	52°25′21″N 2°8′31.2″W		Madonna and child		
Worcestershire	Lower Moor	St. Thomas	52°7′24.4″N 2°2′3.8″W	1954	Madonna and child		
Worcestershire	Lower Moor	St. Thomas	52°7′24.4″N 2°2′3.8″W	1952	St. Thomas, Christ, St. John the Baptist		
Worcestershire	Upton Snodsbury	St. Kenelm	52°11′15.4″N 2°5′4.6″W	1968	Christ in majesty		
Worcestershire	Upton Snodsbury	St. Kenelm	52°11′15.4″N 2°5′4.6″W	1969	St. Wulstan		
Worcestershire	Upton Snodsbury	St. Kenelm	52°11′15.4″N 2°5′4.6″W	1980	"Seedtime and harvest shall not fail"		
Worcestershire	Upton Snodsbury	St. Kenelm	52°11′15.4″N 2°5′4.6″W	1974	"I am the way, the Truth and the Life" (John 14:6)		
Belgium	Antwerp	St. Boniface	51°12′9.1″N 4°25′1.92″E				
South Africa	Cape Town	St. George's Cathedral	33°55′30″S 18°25′9.3″E	1957	Rose window		
