= Churchill, Wychavon =

Village and civil parish in England

Coordinates: 52.180565°N 2.1147045°W

Churchill
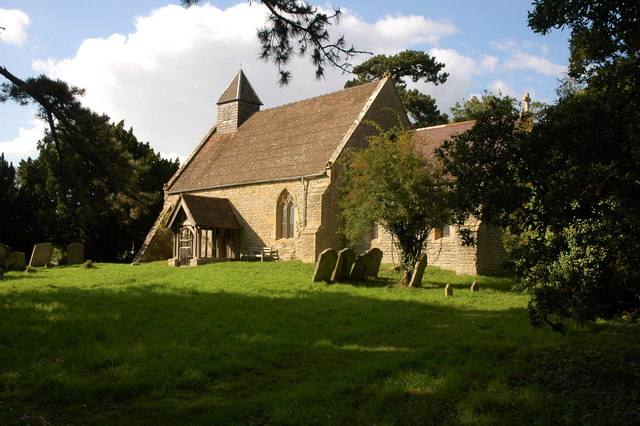
- St Michael

- Location within Worcestershire
- Area: 2.72 km^{2} (1.05 sq mi)
- Population: 25 (2021)
  - Density: 9/km^{2} (23/sq mi)
- OS grid reference: SO923536
- Civil parish: Churchill
- District: Wychavon
- Shire county: Worcestershire
- Region: West Midlands
- Country: England
- Sovereign state: United Kingdom
- Post town: WORCESTER
- Postcode district: WR7
- Police: West Mercia
- Fire: Hereford and Worcester
- Ambulance: West Midlands
- UK Parliament: Mid Worcestershire

Churchill or Churchill in Oswaldslow is a village and civil parish 4 miles (6.4 km) from Worcester, in the Wychavon district of the county of Worcestershire, England. In 2021 it had a population of 25.

The boundary of the parish has Bow Brook running south along the eastern side with Upton Snodsbury to the east, Edward's Lane forms the southern boundary dividing it from White Ladies Aston, additionally the parish touches Bredicot to the north west, Broughton Hackett to the north and Spetchley to the west.

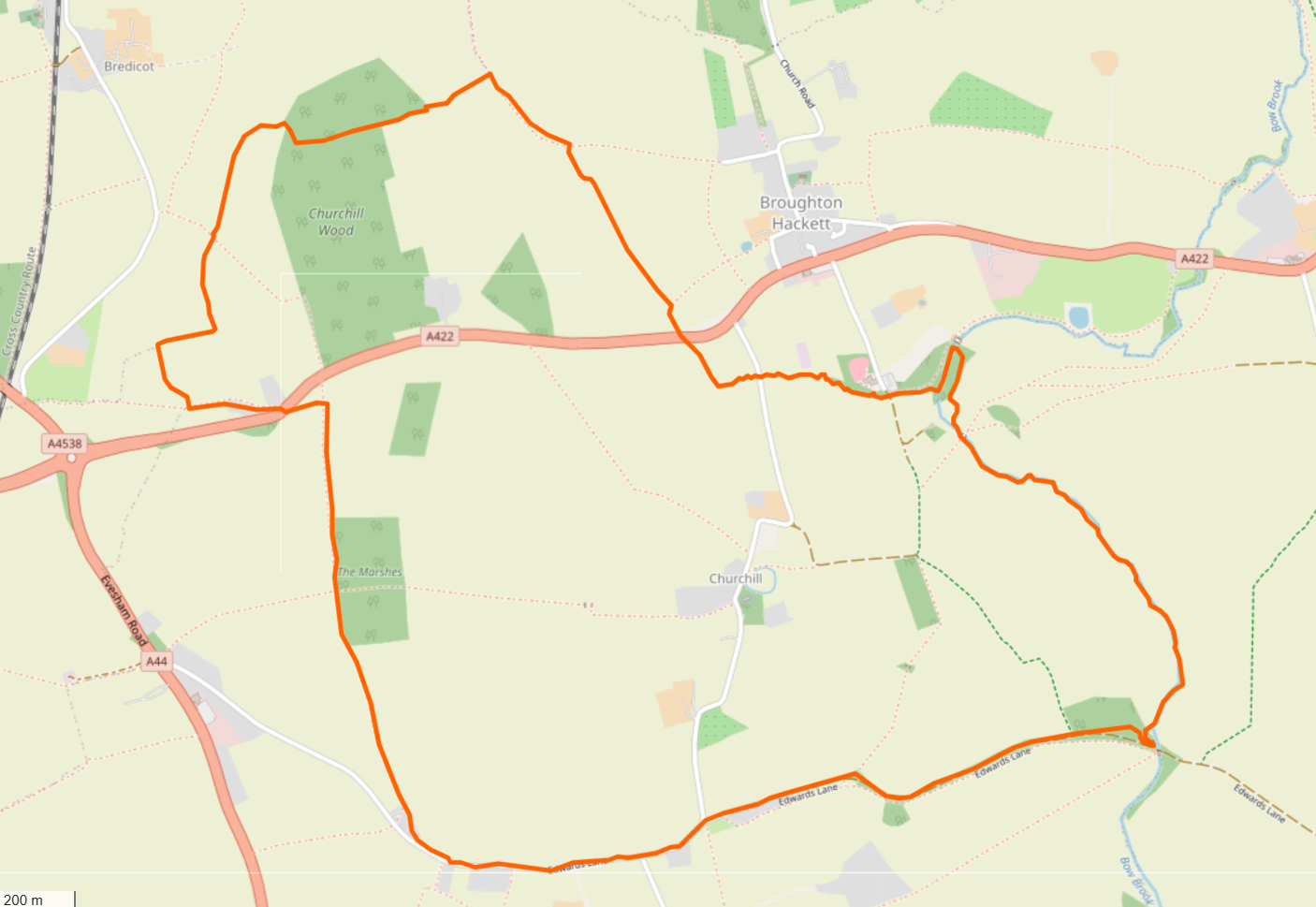
The boundary of the parish of Churchill

== Features ==
There are 8 listed buildings in Churchill. Churchill has a church called St Michael's Church.

== History ==
=== Iron Age ===
The area of Churchill has links to the Iron Age through the saltways. One saltways linked Droitwich to Oxford (now A44) and off this road runs Edward’s Lane which was also a saltway. This lane marks the southern boundary of Churchill and indicates that this area was known to Iron Age people.

=== Anglo-Saxon ===
The name Churchill derives from the Primitive Welsh crūg meaning 'hill/tumulus', and the Old English hyll, also meaning 'hill'. The first element was confused with the Old English cirice meaning 'church'.

Churchill was within Horewell Forest where clearings were created. Located in the hundred of Oswaldslow, which was named in a supposed charter of 964 by King Edgar the Peaceful.

Churchill was also mentioned in a charter in 983 A.D. as a result of a boundary disputes with neighbouring Bredicot.

Unseemly disputes between the men of Churchill and Bredicot will hopefully recur no longer now that Oswald, Archbishop of York and Bishop of Worcester, has granted the latter to the priest Goding and included the following Boundary description between the two parishes in the Lease: From the Stone Digging to the Dyke and thence westward over the Heath to the little Grove, then southward and to the east of the wolfpit along the path to the Bare Hill in front of the Dyke and along it to the Boundary Place the back to the Dyke and along it to the Salt Street.

By the 11th century a church was built as a chapelry of the church of St. Helen’s in Worcester.

=== Norman ===
==== Domesday Book entries – 1086 ====
Churchill was recorded in the Domesday Book as Circehille. Churchill was "Circehille", in the 11th century and "Cherchull", "Chirchehull" and "Cershull-juxta-Humelbrok" in the 13th century. with a population of 10 households and a mill. Three hides were held by the Bishop of Worcester's manor of Northwick in Claines at the time of the Domesday Survey.

=== Middle Ages ===
In the 13th century, Churchill Court was constructed. The court was located on a promontory of high ground to the north east of St Michael's Church. The island is sub-rectangular, almost circular, and measures approximately 55m by 40m. It is defined by a substantial moat up to 3m deep and 6m wide.

Sir John de Churchill joined the rebellious barons during the Second Barons' War, siding with Simon de Montfort against King Henry III. Sir John de Churchill survived the rebellion, but forfeited all his estates. He was imprisoned in 1266 and part of his land was assigned to his wife Maud.

By 1269 the chapelry must have become separated from St. Helen's as it was then called a church and its advowson was in dispute between the bishop and Sir John de Churchill.

In the middle of the 13th century Sir John de Churchill and his wife Maud who lived at Churchill Court gave two water-mills under one roof for the support of a chantry priest. The grant was ratified by Edward III in 1344. It seems that the parson of Churchill remained in possession of these mills until the dissolution of the chantries in the reign of Edward VI. In the 16th century this mill was subject to Chancery proceedings which does not seem to have been resolved until 1590 when Elizabeth I granted the two mills to John Williams and John Wells and their heirs for ever.

Sir John de Churchill died before 1272, then his property was given to his widow who was still holding a third of the manor in 1321, but the rest passed between 1280 and 1289 to the heir of Sir John de Churchill, Joan, wife of Giles de Argentein. In 1321, after Maud's death, Joan gave her two-thirds of the manor and the reversion of the other third to Richard de Westbury. Six years later (1327) John de Westbury, a son of Richard, gave the manor of Churchill to Sir John de Wisham and his wife Hawise, and in 1328 Sir John obtained a grant of free warren from the king for exclusive hunting rights on his Churchill estate.

Sir John died in 1332. In 1356 Hawise settled the manor with Sir John's son and heir, John. The Wisham Family has left their mark on Churchill church where the Wisham's coat of arms, featuring a band between 6 martlets, is displayed in the east window.

The manor had passed from him to another John de Wisham before 1415. This John married Lady Margaret Beauchamp, daughter and heir of John de Beauchamp (1378–1420). After his death the manor was divided between the Guise and Croft families.

=== English Civil War ===
Two soldiers are recorded as being buried in Churchill's Churchyard during the course of the English Civil War, according to the church's burial register. “John Bamford, of Churchill, died at Parshore (Pershore), under the surgion, being wounded by a soldiar, and buried at Churchill on 11th of August, Ano 1646” and “On Sept. 2nd 1651" (the very day before Cromwell's “crowning mercy” of Worcester) "a soldiar, which quarter'd with Robert Paddy, was buried”.

=== Turnpike Road ===
Turnpike roads in Worcestershire began to be introduced from 1713. The Alcester United Turnpike Trust organised the turnpike road which passed through Churchill (now the A422) in the middle of the 18th century. A toll house was located at nearby Broughton Hackett.

=== French Revolution ===
In 1792, a group of English nuns of the Poor Clares, who had been expelled from Dunkerque during the French Revolution, found refuge in the parish. They were supported by Mr. Robert Berkeley, and a gravestone in the churchyard commemorates their presence.

=== World Wars ===
The 1911 United Kingdom census recorded that the village had a population of just 65 inhabitants. The settlement still remained a small hamlet, containing the church, mill, rectory, 3 farms and 8 dwellings of which 3 were uninhabited.

Although a small hamlet, eleven people from Churchill served in World War I with four losing their lives. In World War II a further five villagers served.
