= White Ladies Aston =

Village in Worcestershire, England

Coordinates: 52.170°N 2.115°W

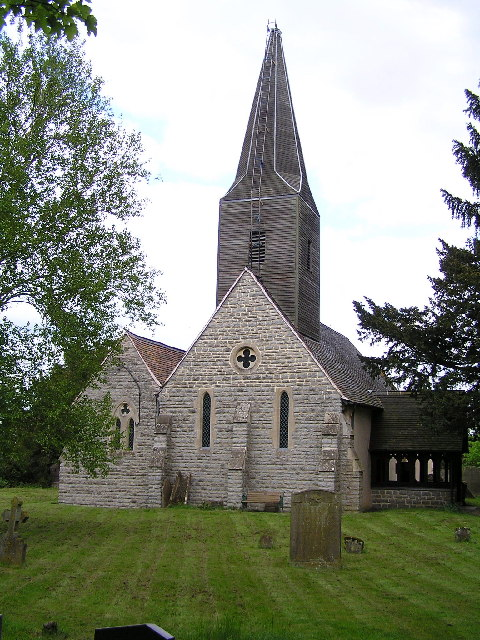
- St John the Baptist

- Location within Worcestershire
- Population: 237
- OS grid reference: SO849548
- Civil parish: White Ladies Aston
- District: Wychavon
- Shire county: Worcestershire
- Region: West Midlands
- Country: England
- Sovereign state: United Kingdom
- Post town: WORCESTER
- Postcode district: WR7
- Police: West Mercia
- Fire: Hereford and Worcester
- Ambulance: West Midlands
- UK Parliament: Droitwich and Evesham

White Ladies Aston is a village in the Wychavon local government district of Worcestershire, England, and also lends its name to the civil parish in which the village is located. The village is located to the east of the A44 which started as a Saltway linking Droitwich to Oxford. To the south is Pershore and five miles west is Worcester. The parish is bound to the east by the Bow Brook. The parish, according to the 2021 census, has a population of 237.

There is evidence that people at least passed through the area during the Neolithic or early Bronze Age. As a village it has existed since Roman times with the parish boundaries being formed during the Anglo-Saxon period and have remain until today. The Domesday Book mentions local land owners notably the Bishop of Worcester who granted Aston Manor to the Cistercian Nuns in 1255. The nuns were referred to as the "White Ladies" which combined with the word "Aston", derived from the Anglo-Saxon term for "East Farm", forming the name of "White Ladies Aston".

The parish Church of England church is dedicated to St John the Baptist.

== History ==
=== Pre-Roman and Roman times ===
The A44 (Evesham Road) and Edward's Lane are ancient saltways dating back to the Iron Age. These saltways linked Droitwich to Oxford after branching from the saltway from Droitwhich to Worcester at Martin Hussingtree. The A44 (Evesham Road) saltway to the west and Edward's Lane to the north formed parts of the parish boundaries.

=== Anglo-Saxon ===
During the Saxon times the village was referred to as "Eastun", "Estun" and "Aston" as the term for "East Farm" in relation to the Cathedral of Worcester.

Located in the parish was a mound named after Oslaf, a Bernician prince fighting King Penda. This mound became the meeting place for the Oswaldslow Hundred Court after its creation in 964 A.D. and was renamed after Oswald. Now known as Low Hill.

The boundaries of the parish date back to Saxon times. The eastern boundary is the Bow Brook, formalised in 974 AD by King Edgar granting land to the east of the Bow Brook to Pershore Abbey establishing a permanent boundary with the parish of Peopleton.

In 976 the western boundary was changed as the result of the ruling of the Hundred Court where by a local farmer was accused of illegally farming land to the western side of the saltway. The ruling was in his favor, as a result the parish was expanded to include the area of Snaetch's Hill to the west of the saltway. Today known as Sneachill.

As the result of a land dispute between Bredicot and Churchill the Bredicot boundary charter of 983 A.D. defined the northern boundary between Bredicot and Aston Episcopi as, "along the dyke to the salt way".

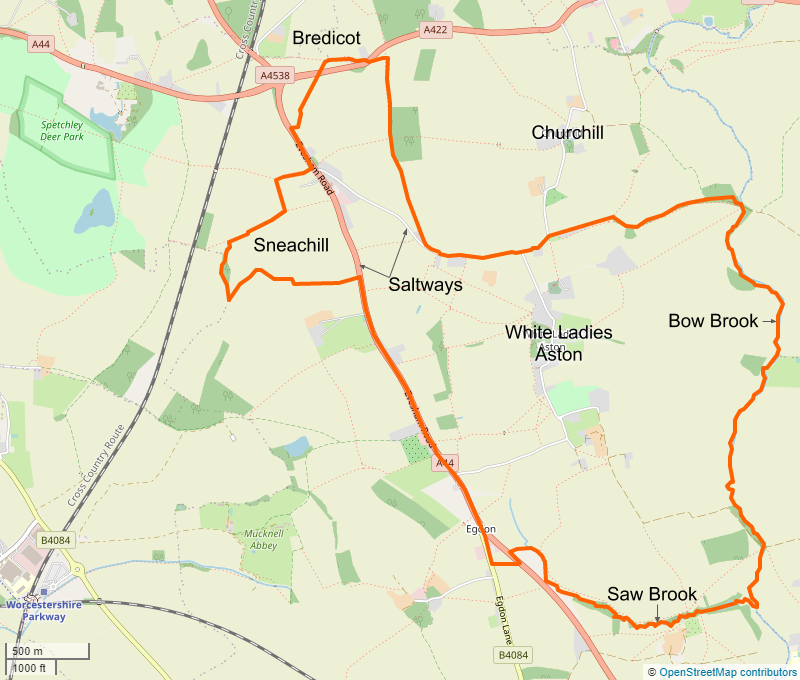
The boundary of the parish of White Ladies Aston

In 984 the south west and southern boundary of the parish was defined by Bishop Oswald as:

"'From Snaet's [Snaetch's] Spring above the Marsh along the Rommes Valley to the Salt Street (Saltway), thence southward past Oswald's Low to the Salters' Well (Egdon) and along the dyke to the Saw Brook and along this brook to the Bow Brook and along the Bow Brook to the Wood Ford at Beornwynn's Valley''.

=== Norman ===
==== Domesday Book entries – 1086 ====
Worcestershire was divided between major landowners with the Church of St. Mary's, Worcester, holding all the land in Oswaldslow and all the ancient dues and rights of the church confirmed at this time Wulfstan, Bishop of Worcester, was the Tenant-in-chief. In the Domesday Survey, in 1086, the settlement of Aston was recorded under two tenants. The northern section, called Aston Episcopi, formed part of the Manor of Northwick. The Domesday Book entry for the Manor of Aston Episcopi states

Ordric holds 3 hides and 1 virgate of this manor at (White Ladies) Estun. He has 3 ploughs; 5 villagers and 4 smallholders with 4 ploughs. The value was 20s; now 40s.

The southern section, called Nether Aston, formed part of the Manor of Warndon which was held by Urse D'Abitot who leased it to Robert de Bracy. The Domesday Book entry for the Manor of Nether Aston states

Urso also holds 1 hide and 3 virgates at Warndon and (White Ladies) Estun, and Robert from him. He has 2 ploughs, with 2 slaves. Meadow, 16 acres; woodland 2 furlongs long and as wide: it is in the Forest. The value is and was 16s

==== Founding of the church ====
In 1204 Robert de Everay made a gift of two palfreys to the Bishop of Worcester. This action won Robert the right to present a candidate for the office of vicar to the parish of Aston Episcopi and it was understood he intended to build a stone church this resulted in the St John the Baptist church which is still present to this day.

==== The Forest Law of 1217 ====
For people who broke Forest Laws the punishment were severe. Under the 1217 Charter of King Henry III the Forest Laws were removed from Aston parish. The village is located in the north of the Horewell Forest. As a result of this Charter villagers could hunt and gather wood with impunity. This change came about because of the deforestation of the area around Aston caused by a greater need for farm land. Over this time the area changed dramatically in appearance, unlike the neighboring village of Churchill which lay within the Forest of Feckenham and as a result the villagers of Churchill where still subject to the old laws.

=== The Manor of Aston Episcopi from the 12th century to 17th century ===
In 1120 part of Aston Episcopi manor was given by Bishop Theulf to Robert de Evercy. A descendant of the same name obtained a recognition of his right to build a stone church at Aston in 1204. Walter de Cantilupe, Bishop of Worcester, in 1242 acquired additional land for Aston Episcopi from the Manor of Aston Bruley owned by the de Bruley family. In 1255 part of the revenue from Aston Episcopi was granted to the eight Cistercian nuns running the newly formed Whistones Priory in Barbourne, Worcester. The nuns were of the Cistercian Order and wore white habits so creating the village name, White Ladies Aston.

During the Reformation of Henry VIII Whistones Nunnery was dissolved in October 1536. The dissolution of the nunnery might have caused another change in the name of the manor but the name White Ladies Aston remained. This manor was granted on 14 July 1544 to Richard Andrews and John Howe, and on 30 July they sold it to Thomas Hill. A descendant of Thomas Hill, Francis Hill died in 1611 leaving a daughter Alice, wife of Richard Andrews, who sold the manor, in 1612, to Robert Berkeley of Spetchley and the lands continue under Berkeley ownership today. The rest of the Manor of Aston Episcopi was retained by the bishop and remained in the possession of the see of Worcester until 1648. It was then sold by the Parliamentary trustees to Thomas Rawlins, Edmund Giles and Christopher Giles but was restored to the see at the Restoration of Charles II in 1660 and remained in the hands of successive bishops until the death of Henry Pepys when it is transferred to the Ecclesiastical Commissioners.

=== The Manor of Aston Bruley from the 12th century to 17th century ===
Robert de Bruley is recorded as holding the land of Nether Aston in 1185 and it being referred to as Aston Bruley. In the 13th century the marriage of William de Bruley to Beatrice Beauchamp of Warwickshire. The lands in the area continued in the Bruley Family until the middle of the 15th century, when by marriage it became the property of the Danvers Family, then to the Hubaud or Hubold Family. In 1558 the manor was sold to William Solley. The Solley family was still in possession of the manor in 1610 at the point when the Manor of Aston Bruley ceased to exist. By the time of the English Civil Wars (1642–1651) the property was in the possession of the Symonds Family who were Roundheads and energetic supporters of Parliament during the English Civil War.

=== Aston Hall Farm during the English Civil War ===
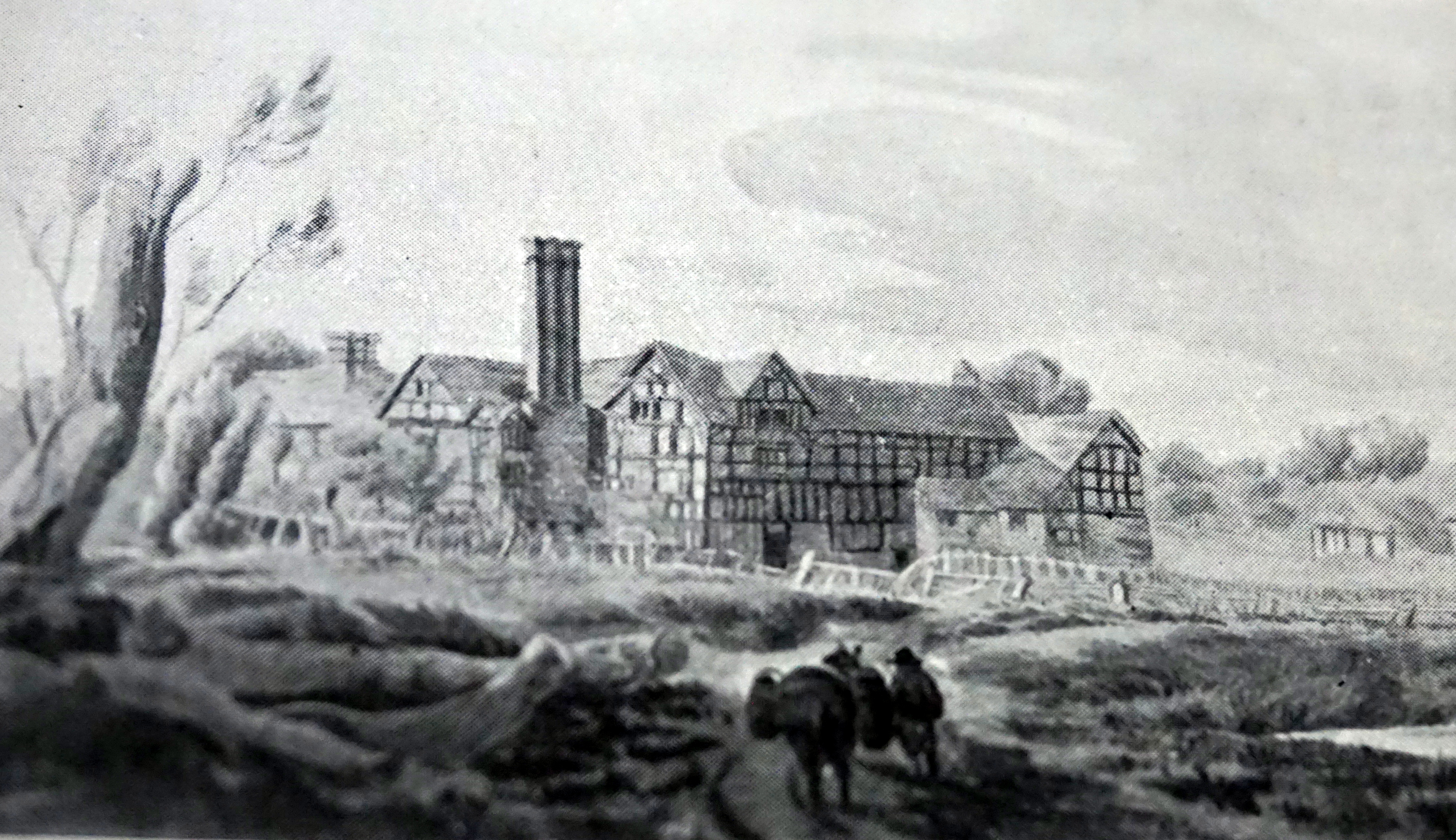
Aston Hall Farm pre 1830s

John Good and Charles Berkeley of Spetchley mustered at Aston Court to join Prince Rupert in the Royal Cavalry before advancing to support King Charles I at the Battle of Newbury in 1643.

By the time of the English Civil Wars the former Manor of Aston Bruley contained a very fine black and white timbered house of Aston Hall Farm. Aston Hall Farm was where Oliver Cromwell, General of the Parliamentary Forces, spent the night of 30 August 1651 with his friend Mr. Justice Symonds in advance of the Battle of Worcester 3 September 1651. At the other end of the village, at Aston Court, an archaeological dig has produced evidence that Parliamentary troops plundered the farm, in 1651 before the Battle of Worcester, when the Royalist Good family refused to provide the Parliamentary troops with billets.

On the 31st he moved to Forward Headquarters at Mr. Justice Berkeley's estate at Spetchley. On 3 September the Battle of Worcester began. Oliver Cromwell advanced from Nunnery Wood, attacked the city and routed the Royalist force. Charles II was forced to flee from the City of Worcester out of the back door of his lodgings at Rowland Berkeley House (now the King Charles House) and eventually the country, and remained in exile until he returned as King Charles II in 1660.

=== Aston Hall Farm in the 18th century ===
In 1707 Thomas Symond, of Aston Hall Farm, and John Palmer were leaders of the desperate band of ruffians who terrorised their neighbours in White Ladies Aston, Upton Snodsbury and Libbery. The Berrow's Journal later described the incident

In the night of the 7th November, 1707, Mrs Palmer of Upton Snodsbury and her maid servant were murdered, and the house burnt down by a gang of desperate villains, at the head of whom was Mr. Palmer, her only son, and Mr. Symonds, whose sister Palmer had married.

They were captured, tried and executed at Red Hill in Worcester. The lands leased by Mr. Symonds and Mr. Palmer in White Ladies reverted to Worcester Cathedral and Bishop Lloyd set up a trust, to be known as Bishop Lloyd's Charity, to receive the revenues. These were devoted to the foundation of two Charity Schools, one for boys and one for girls on one site in Trinity Hall, Worcester. The house and some land was later purchased by Thomas Henry Bund who later sold all his land in the parish to Mr. Berkeley of Spetchley in around 1836.

=== The village and the Agricultural Revolution ===
White Ladies Aston Inclosure Act 1825
- Act of Parliament
- Parliament of the United Kingdom
- Long title: An Act for inclosing Lands, in the Parish of White Ladies Aston, in the County of Worcester.
- Citation: 6 Geo. 4. c. 79 Pr.

Dates
- Royal assent: 5 July 1825

Prior to 1825 the area around White Ladies Aston operated as an open field system containing medieval ridge and furrow field patterns. The White Ladies Aston Inclosure Act 1825 (6 Geo. 4. c. 79 Pr.) was passed that legally enforced the enclosing of parcels of land into fields of rectangular shapes, surrounded by hedges or fences, these can still be seen in the countryside today.

=== The coming of the railway ===
On 24 June 1840, on the north western edge of White Ladies Aston, the newly built Spetchley station was located on the recently constructed Birmingham and Gloucester Railway. Spetchley served as the main station for Worcester and passengers alighting here were taken by horse and carriage into the city. Mr. I.K. Brunel opening the station said, "The arrival of this modern facility will increase the prosperity of the whole area". In the 1851 census 5 villagers were recorded as working for the railway company. The station was closed to rail passengers on 1 October 1855 with the opening of a new railway line into Worcester, the station remained open as a goods yard finally closing in 1963 as a result of the Beeching Report. In contrast to the closures of railway stations in the 1960s, on Sunday 23 February 2020, a new railway station was opened in the area at Stoulton, Worcestershire Parkway.

== Culture ==
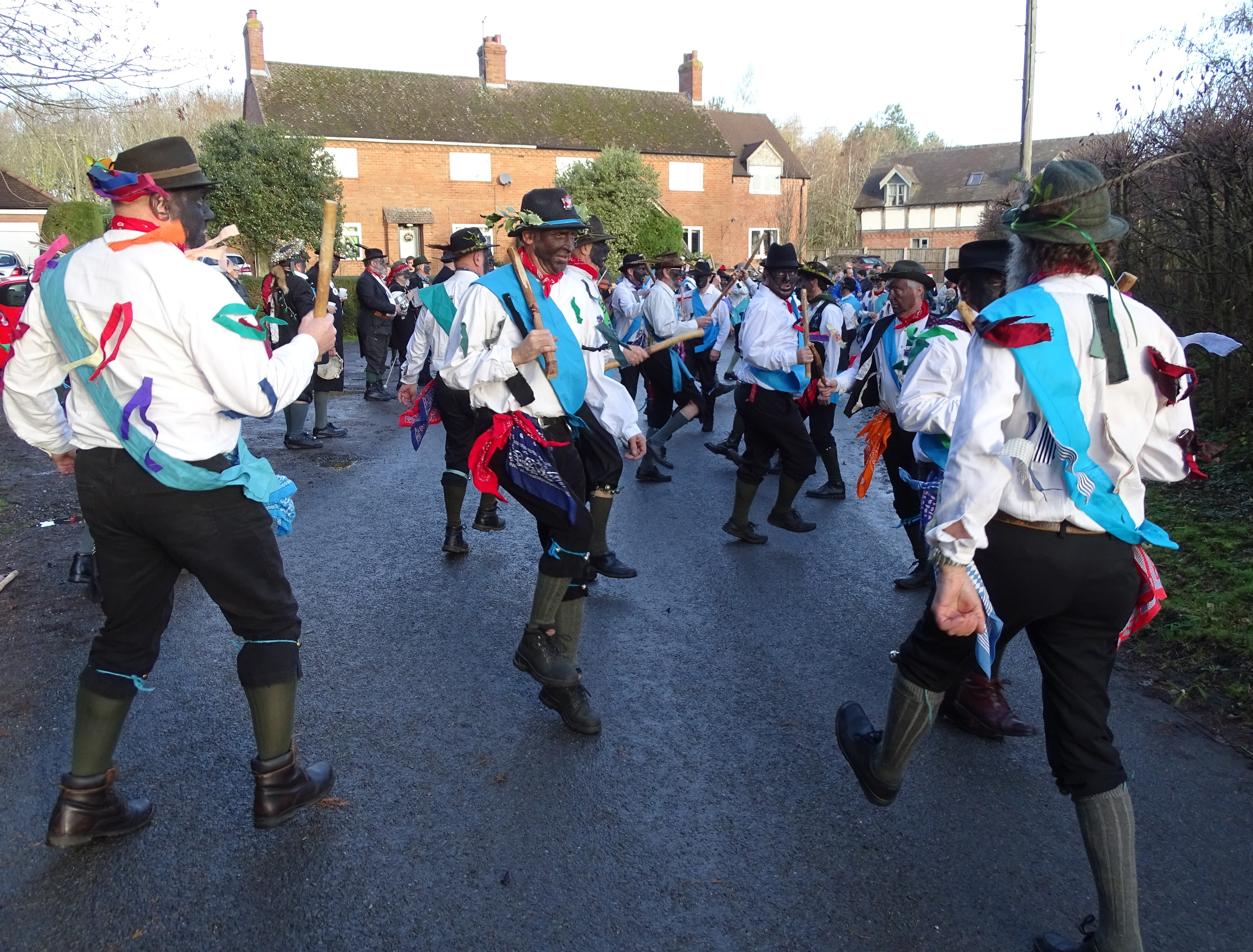
Border Morris White Ladies Aston Dance

The village has given its name to a Border Morris dances: the White Ladies Aston Dance. As part of the revival of Border Morris this is performed each year on the Saturday before Christmas.
