= St John the Baptist, White Ladies Aston =

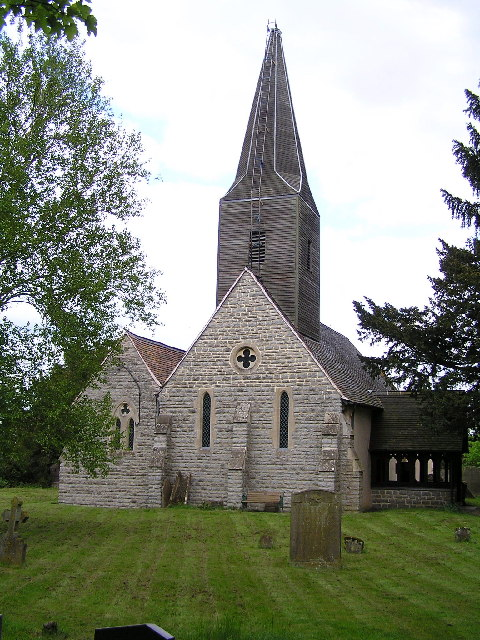
- St John the Baptist, White Ladies Aston
- St John the Baptist, White Ladies Aston
- 52°10′21″N 2°06′55″W
- OS grid reference: SO 92209 52703
- Location: White Ladies Aston
- Country: England
- Denomination: Church of England

History
- Dedication: St John the Baptist

Architecture
- Heritage designation: Grade II* listed

St John the Baptist is a church in White Ladies Aston, Worcestershire, England. It has been designated as a Grade II* listed building by Historic England.

== History ==
It is a building of Norman origin, dating from 1204 when Robert de Everay made a gift of two palfreys to the Bishop of Worcester. This action won Robert the right to present a candidate for the office of vicar to the parish of Aston Episcopi and it was understood he intended to build a stone church. Today, the stone church stands with a wooden spire. The doorway is Norman and the font is probably of the 13th century.

In 1255, Aston was renamed White Ladies Aston as linked to Whistones Priory and Cistercian Nuns. Details of the endowment to the nuns included 51 acres of arable land and 2 acres of meadow at Aston Episcopi, or White Ladies' Aston, together with the tithes of the demesne lands at Northwick and Newland (Worcester), and lands in Claines. A further grant was made by Bishop Giffard in 1283 of the tithes of the chapel of Aston Episcopi, or White Ladies' Aston. The church's links with the White Ladies ended in 1536 when Whistones Priory was closed in the Dissolution of the Monasteries an action authorised by King Henry VIII during the Reformation of the Church in England from Roman Catholic to Protestant.

The oldest timbers in the tower and spire date back to the 15th century. In 1410, a new bell was purchased for the church.

The 17th century, during the time of the English Civil War, there was the growth of extreme religious groups which caused problems in the country, even in the Church of John the Baptist. In 1652 the curate, John Moseley was ejected from the church over anti Quaker sermons; in 1656 Robert Brown, a Fifth Monarchy Man caused trouble in the congregation and in 1661 this curate was ejected from the church over pro Commonwealth sermons at the time of the Restoration of King Charles II.

The Reverend Henry Martyn Sherwood (son of Mary Martha Sherwood 19th-century English children's writer and Captain Henry Sherwood of the 53rd (Shropshire) Regiment of Foot) served the Church of White Ladies Aston from 1839 - 1910, the second longest serving vicar in the Church of England. He was active in creating changes in the village, extending the church, providing education, improving roads and providing the Parish Room.

In 1848, the church was described by John Noake, as being in a poor condition with "broken glass", "the chancel is divided from the nave by a thick wall … with a large square opening" and as Nash observed, the high pews were so high that "when I sat down …. the congregation and the World entire, were totally shut out."

In 1861, extensive building work completed. A complete new North Aisle and Vestry were built, the Early English stonework and timbers were completely overhauled. New pews were installed and the seating accommodation increased from 73 to 155. An avenue of 22 Yew Trees, one for each year the Rev. Sherwood was Vicar, were planted on each side of the approach path. The costs of the work were met by private subscription and a £50 grant was given by the Incorporated Society for Building of Churches.

A large donation, which covered much of the cost of the repair, was made by Mr. Perrins of Worcester to honour a longstanding Family Debt of Gratitude. Mr. Perrin's grandfather who owned a chemist's shop, made up an Indian Sauce to a recipe left by Lord Sandys of Ombersley's housekeeper in 1812. This was the celebrated Worcestershire sauce, now known worldwide. Capt. Sherwood, on leave from India, purchased a bottle and suggested to Mr. Perrins that he should produce it commercially. This he later did, in company with Mr. Lea, and the firm of Lea & Perrins prospered so well that Mr. Perrin's father promised a reward to Capt. Sherwood's son, the Rev. Sherwood. An annual renewal of the offer became a tradition between the Perrins and Sherwood families, but it is claimed that it has been repeatedly declined until the present occasion.

In 1864, a new porch was added. In 1938, the East Window was installed. The Parishes of White Ladies Aston and Churchill were merged in 1924 to form a Joint Benefice with Churchill. In 1985, repairs were completed on the wooden spire.

== Exterior ==
The church lies within a secluded churchyard to the north of the village approached via a yew tree lined path. Entrance is via a timber porch of 1864 to a Norman doorway into the south side of the nave. The western wooden tower has an elegant splay-footed spire, the main timbers of which are as old as the shipwrecked Mary Rose, i.e. circa 1545. The chancel roof is slightly lower than the nave and on the north side there is an aisle of 1861 and an adjoining vestry to the east. The stones are a mixture of uncoursed lias rubble with Cotswold dressings on the corners. The Victorian work stands as a contrast, it being coursed lias stone. The west wall of the nave was rebuilt in 1861 with a pair of widely spaced lancets and a small quatrefoil window above. Three buttresses support this wall.

== Interior ==
Within the church presents a light and welcoming appearance as the walls are rendered and painted pale cream. The arcade is of three bays of moulded flatly pointed arches and alternating light and darker stone. Their capitals are well moulded with octagonal shafts. The tower is supported on the south side by massive timbers to the floor assisted by an iron column but on the north the timbers come down only to the top of the arcade. Between the arches are trefoil decorative mouldings, one dated 1861, the date of the restoration. Either side of the plastered nave roof is a row of vertical struts supporting the roof rafters assisted by a pair of tie beams. The ceiling is plastered. The chancel roof has two tie beams with queen posts, but its rafters are half exposed the remainder being plastered. The chancel arch is a depressed or three-centred type.

There is a doorway from the north wall of the chancel to the vestry The windows are Norman narrow round-arched type in the chancel with restored square-headed Perpendicular windows on the south side of the nave and chancel The west wall has two lancets mentioned before with a two-light Victorian window to the aisle. On the north side is a pair of two-light windows within a wide segmental arch and a renewed Norman doorway between them best seen from the outside.

=== Fittings ===
The fittings mostly date from the 1861 restoration including the seating The pulpit is of wood and lozenge pattern panels The book for supporting the tester or sounding board from the old three decker pulpit still hangs on the wall nearby.

The font is twelve-sided and of uncertain date but thought to be mediaeval. It has well-cut mouldings down the sides and damage where the old hasps were positioned so that it could be locked when not in use.

=== Tablets ===
The 18th century saw England becoming a global power fighting wars in Europe, North and South America, the Middle East, India and South East Asia. Individuals from White Ladies Aston were involved in these areas of action and witnessed important events in the growth of the British Empire. Some of these individuals and their careers are recorded on memorials inside the church.

Captain Thomas Elrington died in 1809, aged 87, having served for 65 years in the army, taking part in events such as the "45 Jacobite Rebellion" and the Seven Years' War (1756 – 63) in North America under General Braddock and Lord Amherst.

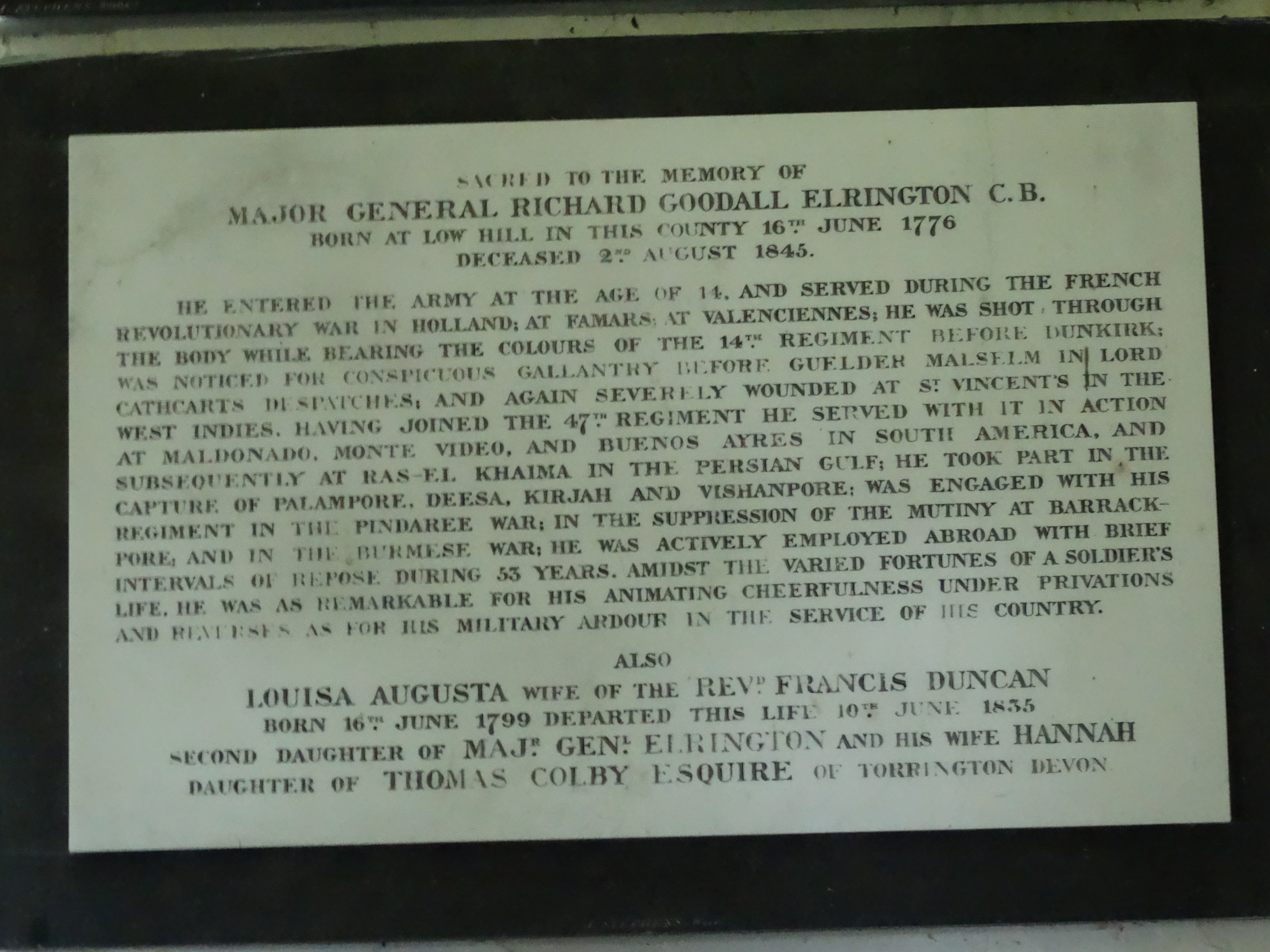
Major General Richard Goodall Elrington

Richard Goodall Elrington was born on 16 June 1776 at Low Hill House, White Ladies Aston. He was appointed Major-General on 23 November 1841. He died on 2 Aug 1845 in Pancras, London. He entered the army at the age of 14 during the French Revolutionary War and served in actions across the world.

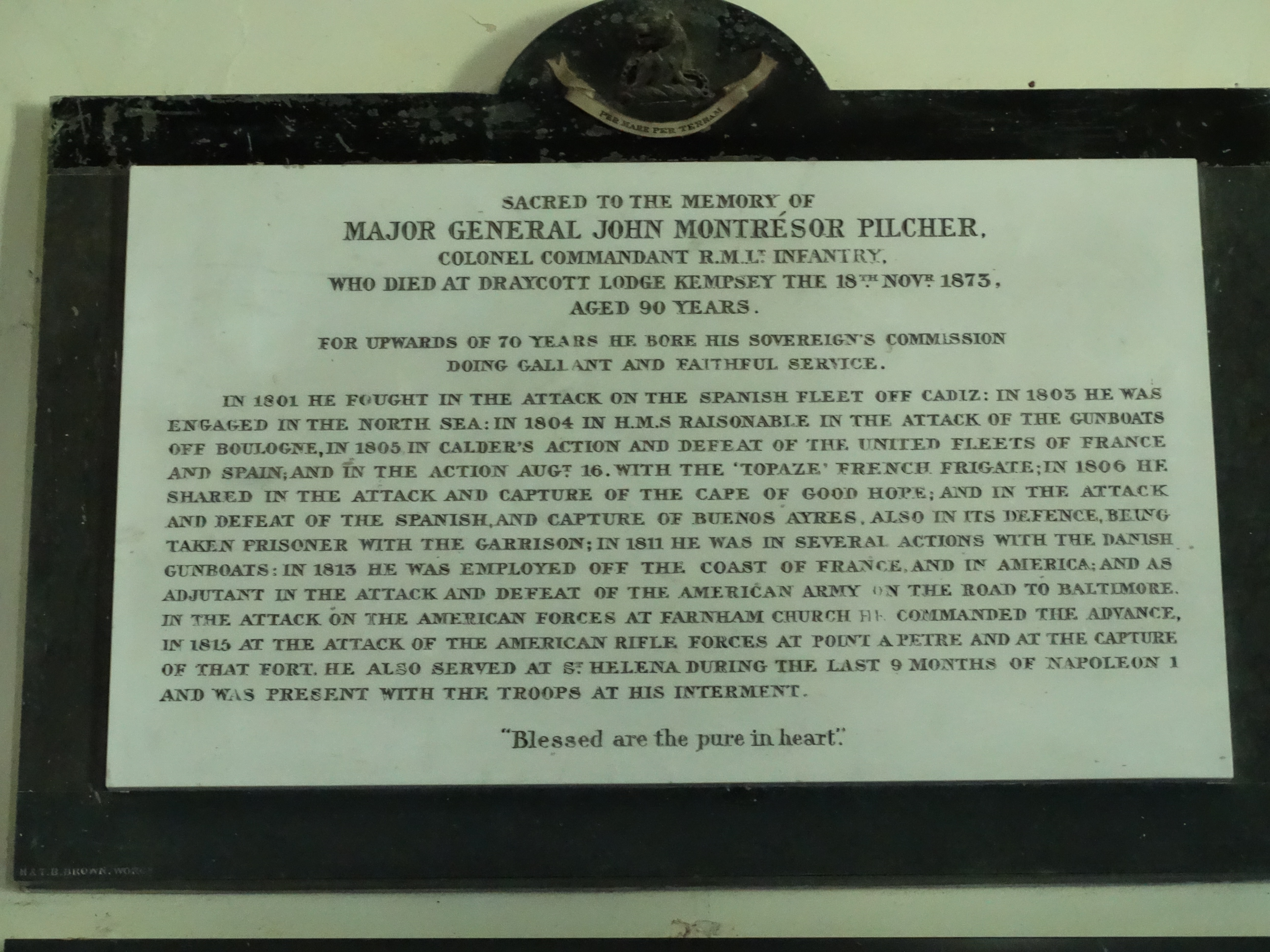
Major General John Montresor Pilcher Plaque

Major General John Montresor Pilcher. Born in 1783, he married Elizabeth Mary Elrington of Low Hill House, the daughter of Captain Thomas Elrington. He was involved in numerous naval events between 1801 and 1815 and was present at the death of Napoleon on St. Helena.

Hamilton Thomas Gordon. Born on 15 May 1836, the son of Captain Robert Cumming Hamilton Gordon and Francis. He gained the rank of Lieutenant in 1855 in the service of the Honourable East India Company, Bengal Engineers. He died on 14 February at Calcutta aged 24 and is buried at Diamond Harbour, Calcutta.

A Memorial Plaque has been erected in the North Aisle of the Church to record the names of villagers in White Ladies Aston who gave their lives in the Great War. Four names are listed: David Gould, William Edwin Judd, Daniel Pearce and William Henry Shuck.

On 7 July, Corporal David Gould, aged 31, was killed in action when his 3rd Battalion of the Worcestershire Regiment attacked the German stronghold of the Leipzig Salient on the Thiepval Ridge in the region of the Somme. David was the son of William and Emma Gould having an older sister, Margaret, and a younger brother, Harry. David was an agricultural worker in the village of White Ladies Aston and had volunteered to join the army.

William Judd died on 9 January 1917 at the Casualty Clearing Stations of Grove Town, aged 23. His parents were Owen and Mary Judd who lived at Greenacres on the Evesham Road. He had an older sister Annie and two younger brothers, Alfred and Horace.

The last 100 days of The Great War were costly for the village of White Ladies Aston. On 29 August 1918, Second Lieutenant Hamilton Stanley Sherwood was killed near Bethune, aged 19. He was the grandson of Reverend Sherwood who served for a long time at White Ladies Aston Church. On 3 September, Henry John Page, who was linked to the village and whose name appears in the churchyard, was killed in action in Northern France, aged 22. On 8 October, Daniel Pearce, aged 22 was killed near Vis en Artois, Northern France. His family lived at Aston Hall and on 30 October, William Henry Shuck, aged 30, was killed in Beirut. He lived at Stonebow.
