= St Michael's Church, Churchill =

Coordinates: 52.1801°N 2.1143°W

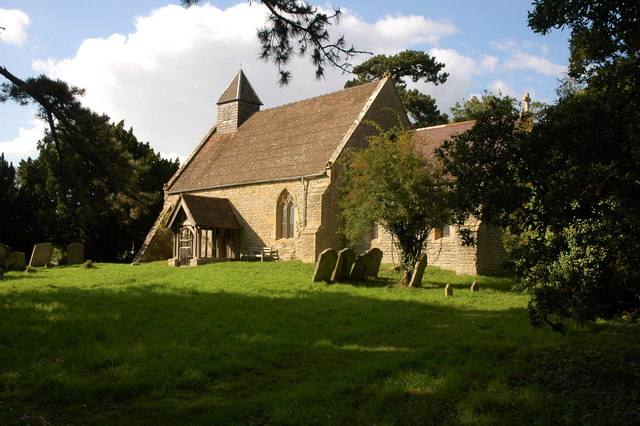
- St Michael's Church, Churchill, from the southeast

- Location in Worcestershire
- OS grid reference: SO 922 535
- Location: Churchill, Worcestershire
- Country: England
- Denomination: Anglican
- Website: Churches Conservation Trust

History
- Dedication: Saint Michael

Architecture
- Functional status: Redundant
- Heritage designation: Grade II*
- Designated: 11 February 1965
- Architectural type: Church
- Style: Gothic
- Groundbreaking: 14th century

St Michael's Church is a redundant Anglican church in the village of Churchill in Oswaldslow, Worcestershire, England. It is recorded in the National Heritage List for England as a designated Grade II* listed building, and is under the care of the Churches Conservation Trust.

== History ==
The church dates from the 14th century, and contains fragments of masonry from an earlier church building on the site. It was restored in 1863, and there was another restoration in 1910.

The Parishes of White Ladies Aston and Churchill were merged in 1924 to form a Joint Benefice with Churchill church became a Chapel of Ease.

The building was modernised in 1955 when electricity was installed. By the 1990's extensive repairs were required which were beyond the scope of the small population. In April 1999 the church was vested into the hands of the Churches Conservation Trust.

== Architecture ==
The plan of St Michael's consists of a nave with a south porch, and a chancel. At the west end is a bellcote. Each wall of the nave contains a single window.

Inside the church, the font dates from the 15th century. The pulpit dates from the 17th century, and the communion rail is in Jacobean style. The chancel screen and the lectern were moved from Great Malvern Priory at the time of the 1910 restoration. The oldest monument is dated 1688. There are two bells, one of which dates from the 15th century.

== See also ==
- List of churches preserved by the Churches Conservation Trust in the English Midlands
