= Bredicot =

Village in Worcestershire, England

Coordinates: 52°11′36″N 2°8′25″W

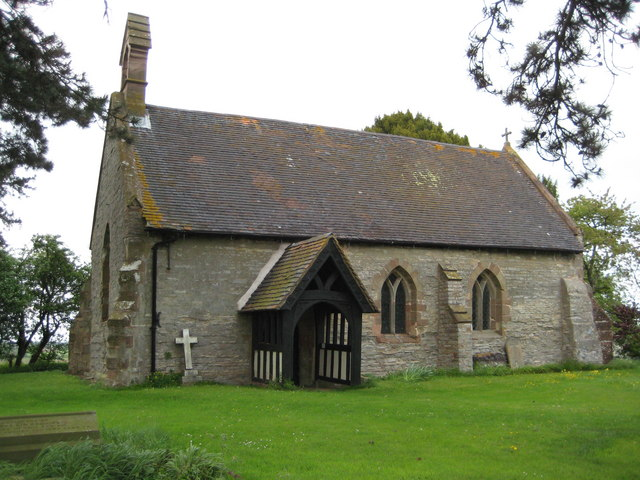
- Church of St James the Less

- Location within Worcestershire
- Population: 25 (2021)
- OS grid reference: SO 906549
- District: Wychavon
- Shire county: Worcestershire
- Region: West Midlands
- Country: England
- Sovereign state: United Kingdom
- Post town: Worcester
- Postcode district: WR7
- Police: West Mercia
- Fire: Hereford and Worcester
- Ambulance: West Midlands
- UK Parliament: Droitwich and Evesham

Bredicot is a small village and civil parish in Worcestershire, England, about 4 miles (6.4 km) east of Worcester. It had a population of 25 at the 2021 census.

It was formerly (as described in 1868) in the hundred of Oswaldslow. In the 11th century the name was Bradingecotan or Bradigcotan.

The name Bredicot derives from the Old English Bradaingcot meaning 'cottage connected with Brada'.

== Church ==
The Church of St James the Less is a Grade II listed building. It is 41 feet (12 m) by 15 feet (4.6 m) with a bellcote and a timber-framed south porch. The building dates from about 1300, and was restored by A. E. Perkins in 1843.

== Bredicot Court House ==
The earliest mention of the manor of Bredicot is in 985, by which time it had been acquired by the church of Worcester, when Bishop Oswald granted the vill to a priest named Goding.

Bredicot Court Farmhouse, Grade II-listed, was built in the early 17th century. It has an H-shaped plan, and is timber-framed with brick infilling; there is an 18th-century brick wing. Also in the village are Court Cottages, timber-framed buildings of the 16th or 17th century, Grade II-listed.

== Bredicot School ==
A church school offering education at very low cost was built in Bredicot for children of the surrounding villages of Churchill, Broughton Hackett, White Ladies Aston and Spetchley opening in 1845.

In the Winter of 1939 the number on the school role at Bredicot Infants School increased to twenty six with the arrival of eleven evacuee children from Birmingham.

In 1957 with only five attendees the school finally closed. The building was demolished in the early 1970s.
