= Warndon =

Parish and suburb of Worcester in Worcestershire, England

Coordinates: 52.205794°N 2.176242°W

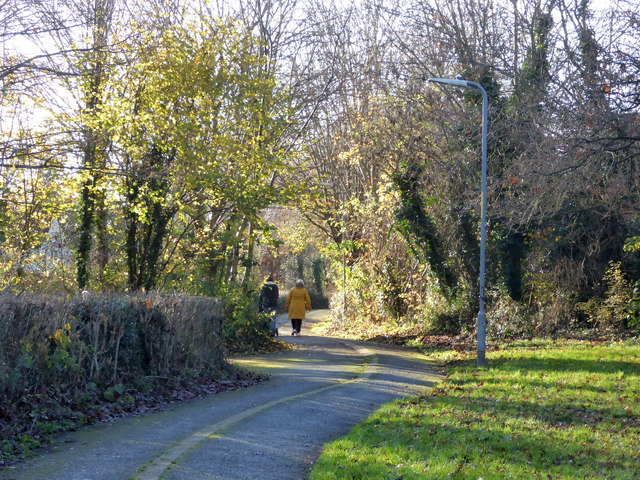

- Location within Worcestershire
- Population: 10,730 2021 Census
  - London: 131 mi (211 km) SE
- Civil parish: Warndon Villages
- District: Worcester
- Shire county: Worcestershire
- Region: West Midlands
- Country: England
- Sovereign state: United Kingdom
- Post town: Worcester
- Postcode district: WR4
- Dialling code: 01905
- Police: West Mercia
- Fire: Hereford and Worcester
- Ambulance: West Midlands
- UK Parliament: Worcester

Warndon is a suburban area within the city of Worcester district in Worcestershire, England. It is part of Warndon Villages civil parish. The parish then known as Warndon had a population of 10,730 in 2021.

== History ==
The name "Warndon" refers to an Old English personal name Waerma linked to dun, a hill.

Warndon is mentioned in the 1086 Domesday Book as a holding of the Bishop of Worcester, part of the manor of Northwick. It was then held by the Beauchamp and Bracey families until 1205 when Warndon became joined to the manor of Madresfield. In 1594, Sir William Lygon of Madresfield sold Warndon to Rowland Berkeley, who joined it to his manor of Spetchley in 1606. Berkeley Way, the main road bordering Warndon, is named after the Berkeley family.

The parish church of St Nicholas dates from the 12th century and is notable for its black and white timber construction. It is a Grade I listed building. Henry Holbeche, Dean of Worcester, dedicated the church to St Nicholas in 1542. The area around the church is designated a conservation area. Historically, Warndon was a farming hamlet set on a small hill and remained so until the Warndon Villages housing development to the west and south, as well as industrial units to the north, began to be built in the 1980s. Berkeley Way (B4639) forms the northern boundary of the conservation area and was constructed to relieve St Nicholas Lane and leave an undeveloped gap to the industrial units.

== Warndon Villages ==
Warndon Villages is a housing development based on "village" themes on the eastern side of Worcester, situated between Warndon and the M5 motorway.

There are four distinct "villages" in the development, the Harleys, the Lyppards, the Berkeleys, and the Meadows, each with their subdivisions. The first village opened in 1996. Warndon Villages is home to Lyppard Grange Primary School, four nurseries, a Tesco supermarket, community centre and a range of other facilities.

== Civil parish ==
A request to change the name of the civil parish from "Warndon Parish" to "Warndon Villages", under Section 75 of the Local Government Act, 1972, was made by the parish council on 17 January 2025 and approved by Worcester City Council on 18 February 2025.

Warndon Villages which included the villages of Trotshill and Warndon was part of Droitwich Rural District until 1974 when it was annexed to Worcester under the Local Government Act 1972.

=== Open spaces ===
Warndon Wood is an ancient woodland that may have been part of Feckenham Forest. It forms part of Warndon Woods Local Nature Reserve managed by Worcester City Council. A nature trail through a younger woodland named New Plantation links Warndon Wood to Tolladine Wood, another ancient woodland. The boundaries of the two ancient woods are marked by hedgerows which date back to the 13th and 14th-centuries.
