= Worcester Woods Country Park =

Park in Worcester, England

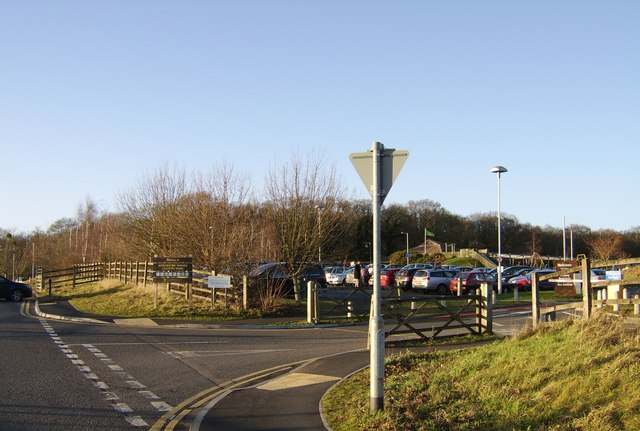
- Interactive map of Worcester Woods Country Park
- Type: Country Park
- Location: Worcester, Worcestershire, England
- Coordinates: 52.1869°N 2.1790°W
- Area: 38
- Operator: Worcestershire County Council
- Open: All year

Worcester Woods Country Park is a country park in Worcester, Worcestershire, England.

== History ==
The land on which the park sits was a medieval farmstead, after the Black Death there was insufficient labour to manage the whole area. The land now comprising Nunnery Wood was abandoned and the oldest trees date to this period, the woods were first owned by the nuns of White Ladies Aston. Hornhill Meadow continued to be farmed and was part of the Hornhill Farmstead in the 1700s. In 1979 Nunnery Wood was acquired by Worcestershire County Council and in 1990 the meadow was acquired, the park was established at this time.

== Location ==
Worcestershire County Council, the owner, is located at the park. It is also adjacent to the Worcestershire Royal Hospital, Nunnery Wood Sports Complex, containing an athletics stadium, and Worcester Sixth Form College.

== Facilities ==
There is a visitor centre with a cafe and toilets, a barbecue and picnic area, a children's play area, an orchard, orienteering, walking trails, an adventure playground, a pond and Worcester Parkrun takes place every Saturday. There is also crazy golf and geocaching. The area covered is 38 Hectares.

== Nature ==
There are two local nature reserves, Nunnery Wood and Hornhill Meadow.
