= Whistones Priory =

Cistercian nunnery in Worcestershire, England

Coordinates: 52.702331°N 2.889375°W

Whistones Priory was a Cistercian nunnery in Worcestershire, England.

The house of St. Mary Magdalene at Whistones in Barbourne, Worcester, in the parish of Claines, was founded by Walter de Cantilupe before 1255. In 1255 the Cistercian nuns were granted 51 acres of arable land and 2 acres of meadow in Aston Episcopi, which as a result became known as White Ladies Aston, as well as the tithes of the demesne lands at Northwick, Newland (Worcester), and lands in Claines. By 1291 the nuns had also acquired a portion of the chapel of Claines, granted by Bishop Giffard in 1283 and the tithes of the chapel of Aston Episcopi, or White Ladies' Aston.

There is no trace of the actual surrender of Whistones at the time of the Dissolution. It probably took place in 1536 under the statute of that year granting the king the "smaller religious houses" whose annual value was under £200. Jane Burrell, the last prioress, received a pension of £5 10s. on her surrender, and enjoyed the same until 1553.
