= Church of The Good Shepherd, Lake =

Church on the Isle of Wight, England

Coordinates: 50°38′47″N 01°10′06″W

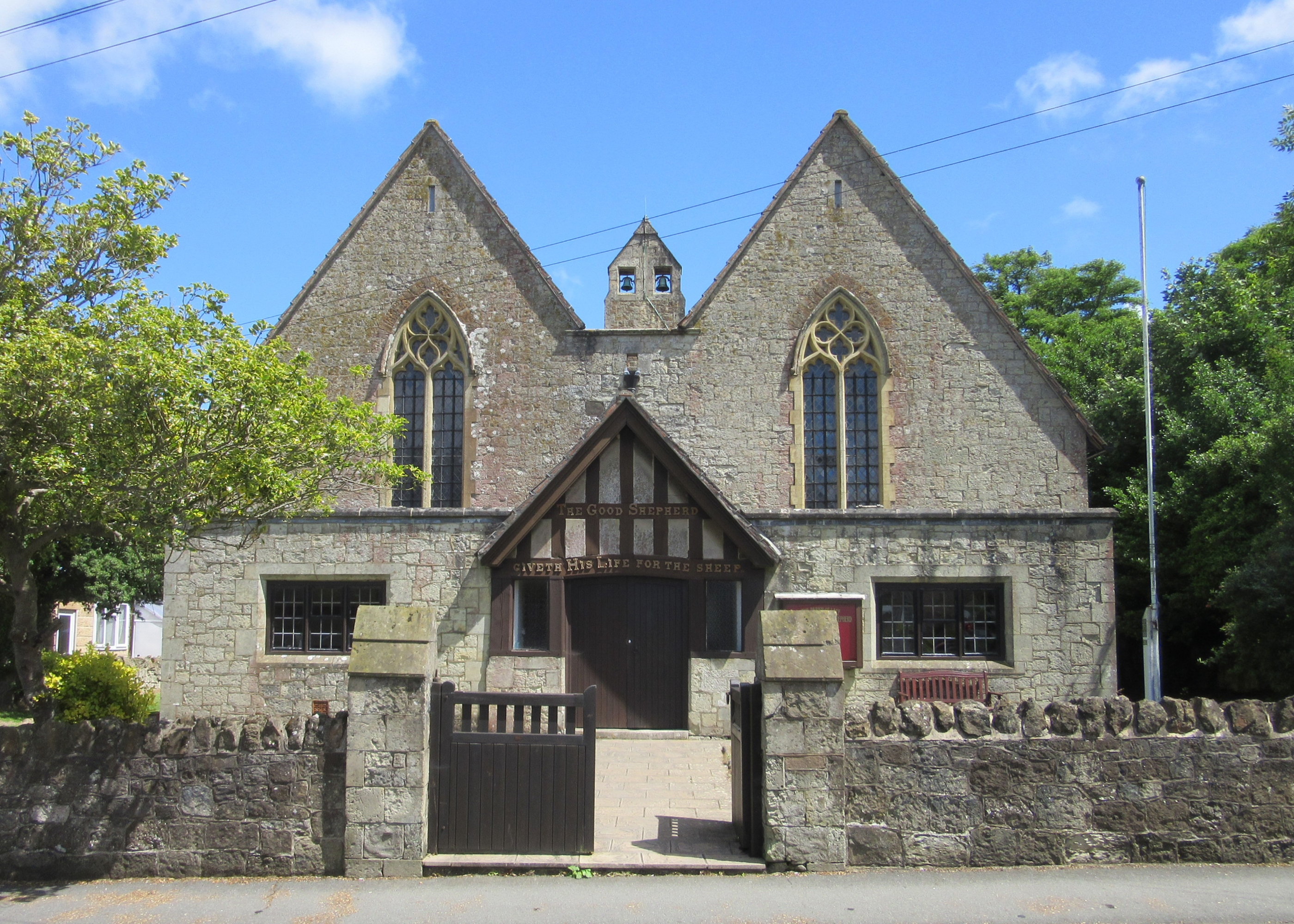
- Church of The Good Shepherd, Lake
- Denomination: Church of England
- Churchmanship: Anglo-Catholic

History
- Dedication: The Good Shepherd

Administration
- Province: Canterbury
- Diocese: Portsmouth
- Parish: Lake, Isle of Wight

The Church of The Good Shepherd, Lake is a parish church in the Church of England located in Lake, Isle of Wight.

== History ==
The church was built in 1892 by the architect Temple Lushington Moore. Its distinctive feature is the twin aisled nave with the single aisle chancel. The stained glass windows were designed by Francis Skeat in the mid 20th-century.

The church is located on Sandown Road.

The church has a small three-manual pipe organ by J. W. Walker & Sons Ltd dating from 1901.

== See also ==
- List of new churches by Temple Moore
