= Lake, Isle of Wight =

Village on the Isle of Wight, England

Coordinates: 50°39′00″N 1°10′04″W

Lake
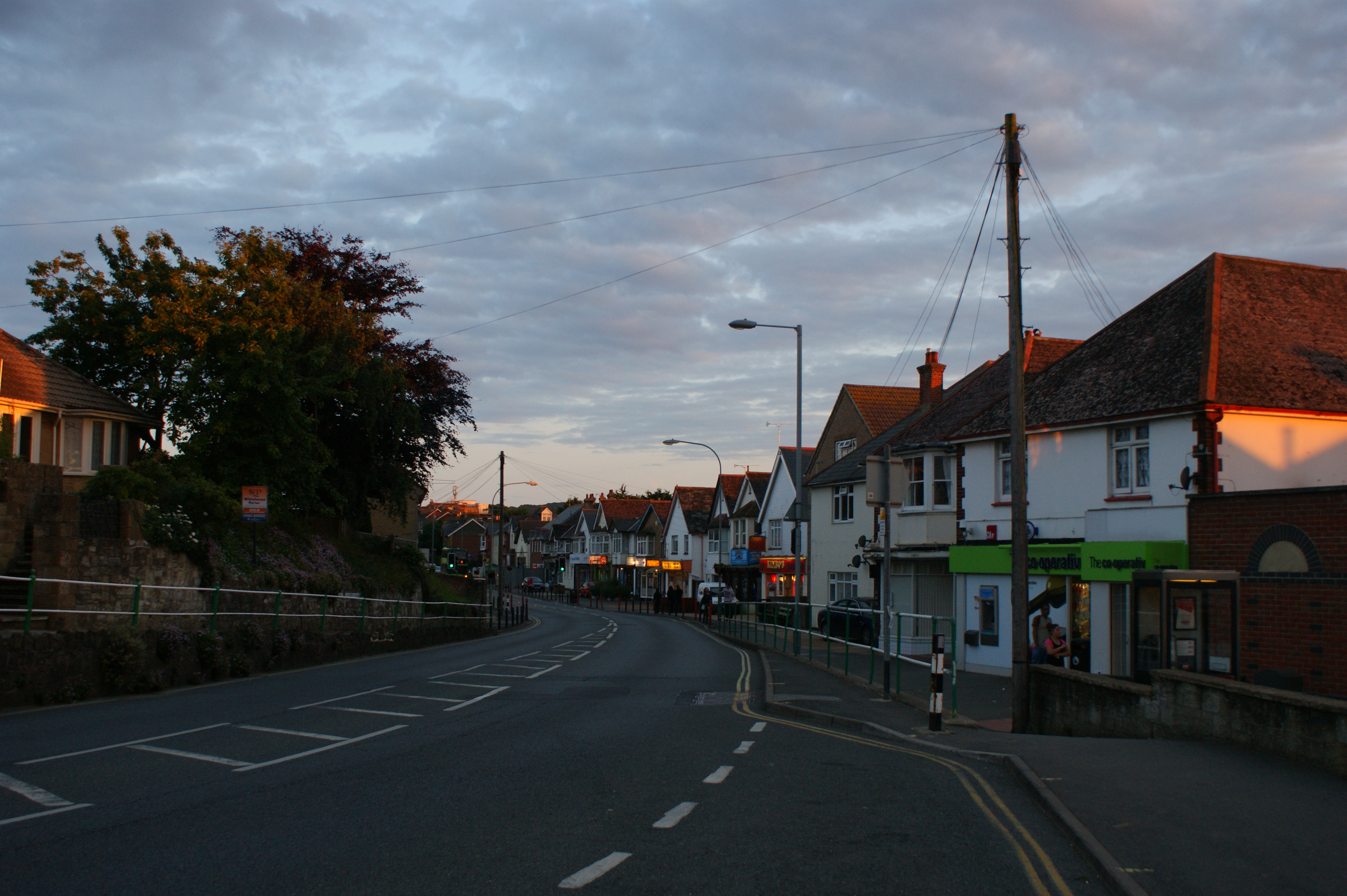
- Lake High Street at dusk

- Location within the Isle of Wight
- Area: 0.938 sq mi (2.43 km^{2})
- Population: 5,117 (2011)
  - Density: 5,455/sq mi (2,106/km^{2})
- OS grid reference: SZ586836
- Civil parish: Lake
- Unitary authority: Isle of Wight
- Ceremonial county: Isle of Wight
- Region: South East
- Country: England
- Sovereign state: United Kingdom
- Post town: SANDOWN
- Postcode district: PO36
- Dialling code: 01983
- Police: Hampshire and Isle of Wight
- Fire: Hampshire and Isle of Wight
- Ambulance: Isle of Wight
- UK Parliament: Isle of Wight East

Lake is a large village and civil parish located on Sandown Bay, on the Isle of Wight, England. It is six miles south-east of Newport situated between Sandown and Shanklin, and 1 1/2 miles (2.4 km) to the east of the hamlet of Apse Heath. In 2011 the parish had a population of 5117.

== Name ==
The village's name comes from the Old English lacu, meaning '(the place at) a stream', probably referring to Scotchell's Brook, a tributary of the Eastern Yar. There is another place called Lake in Gatcombe, with the same origin. In medieval times, Lake was known as Suth Sandham (1241) Suthsandham (1316), with the same origin as Sandown.

== History ==
The high street that runs through Lake has not changed much since the early 20th century. However, the village war memorial, constructed in 1920, has been relocated behind the Fairway Bus Shelter due to having been run down twice by carelessly driven lorries. The thatched cottage at Merrie Gardens dates from the 17th century and is the oldest surviving building in Lake.

Lake is sometimes described as a "lost village" and "no more than an urbanised link between Sandown and Shanklin".

Lakes parish was formed on 1 April 1984 for Sandown-Shanklin unparished area.

== Geography ==
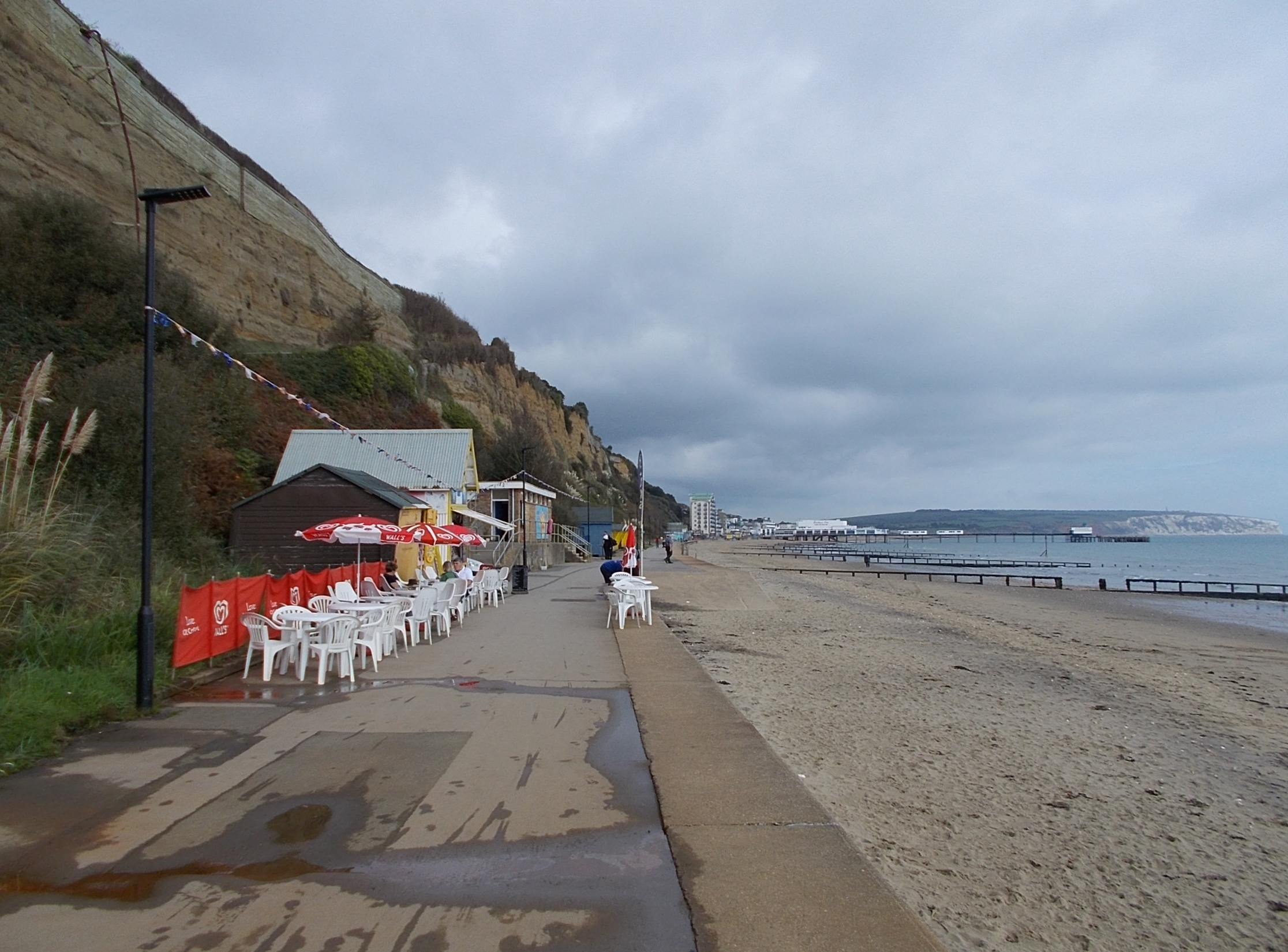
The beach at Lake below the cliffs

Lake is a seaside village situated above the cliffs on Sandown bay, it stands at an elevation of 63 feet (19 m) above sea-level. Lake's beach or 'Welcome Beach' has golden sands and reached by a steep path down the sandstone cliffs to the Revetment. It has two cafes (Hinks and Strollers), beach huts, a Sea Scout hut and inshore lifeboat.

A large public park called Los Altos starts at the boundary between Lake and Sandown. Another large park called Lake Cliff Gardens borders the cliffs that back onto the beach and stretches between Lake and Shanklin.

Local wildlife includes Pipistrelle bats at Los Altos, kestrels along the Cliff Path and Common Toads which spawn in the disused reservoir behind the Mall. The wetlands of the River Yar are an SSSI supporting newts, voles and wildfowl.

== Facilities ==
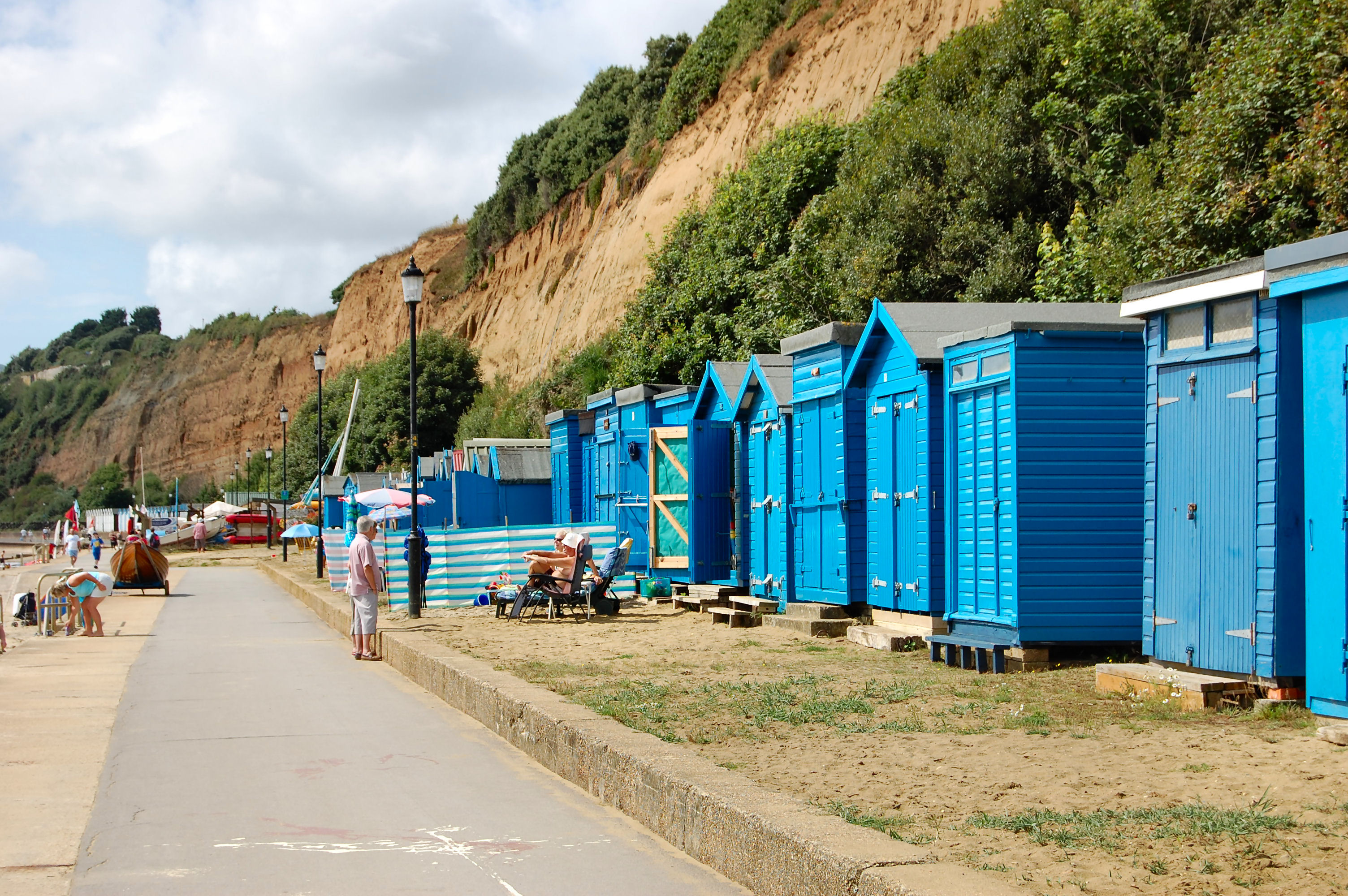
Beach huts at Lake

The village has the Broadlea primary school at Blackpan and The Bay School (Church of England primary and secondary) at the north end of the Fairway. There are several pubs including The Stag, plus The Porter Club (formerly Lake Working Men's Club) and a Town Guild.

There were recently two pubs in the village and many other shops and restaurants.

Sandown & Shanklin Golf Course is behind the Academy School and the Rugby Club in front.

== Religion ==
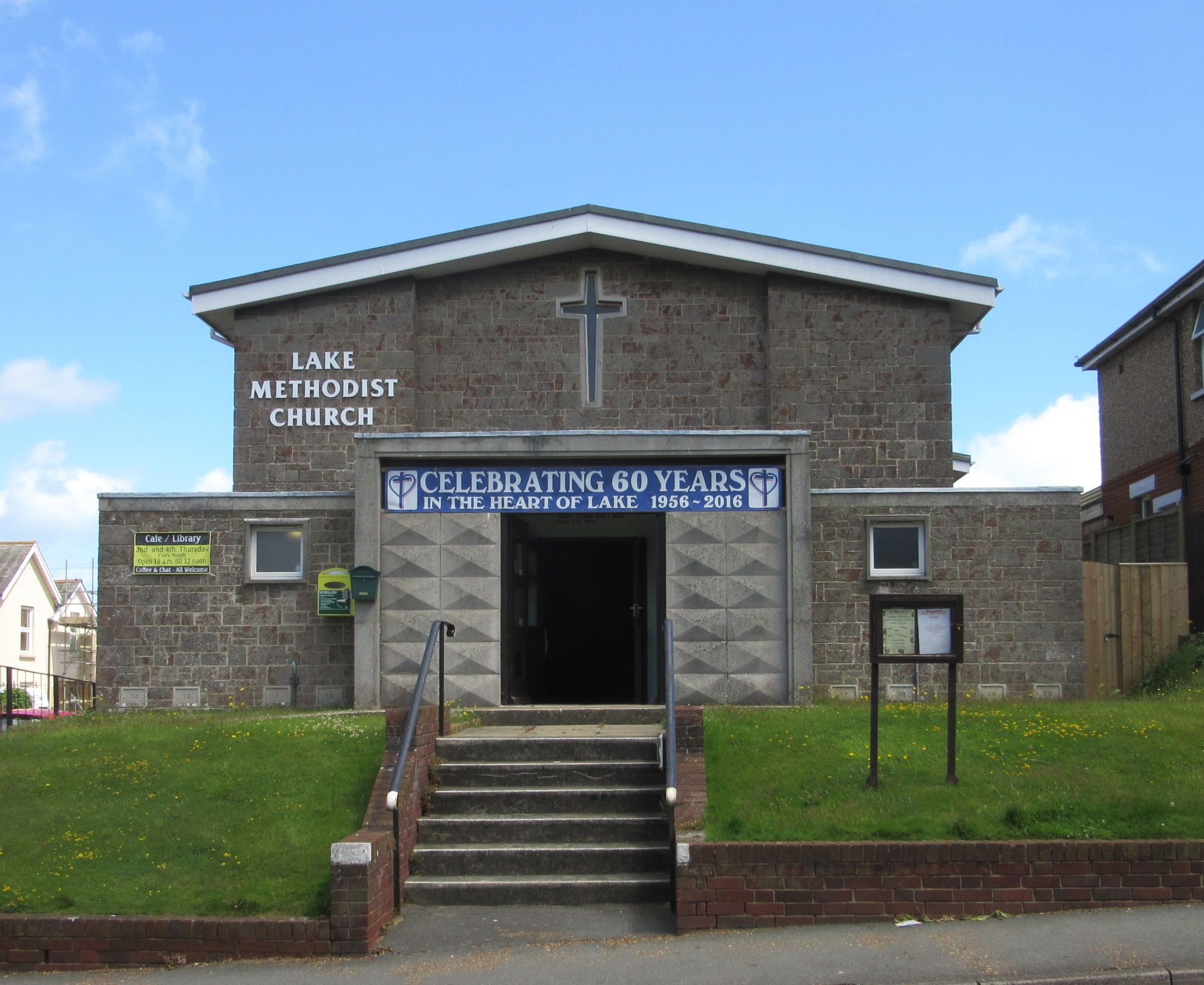
Lake Methodist Church

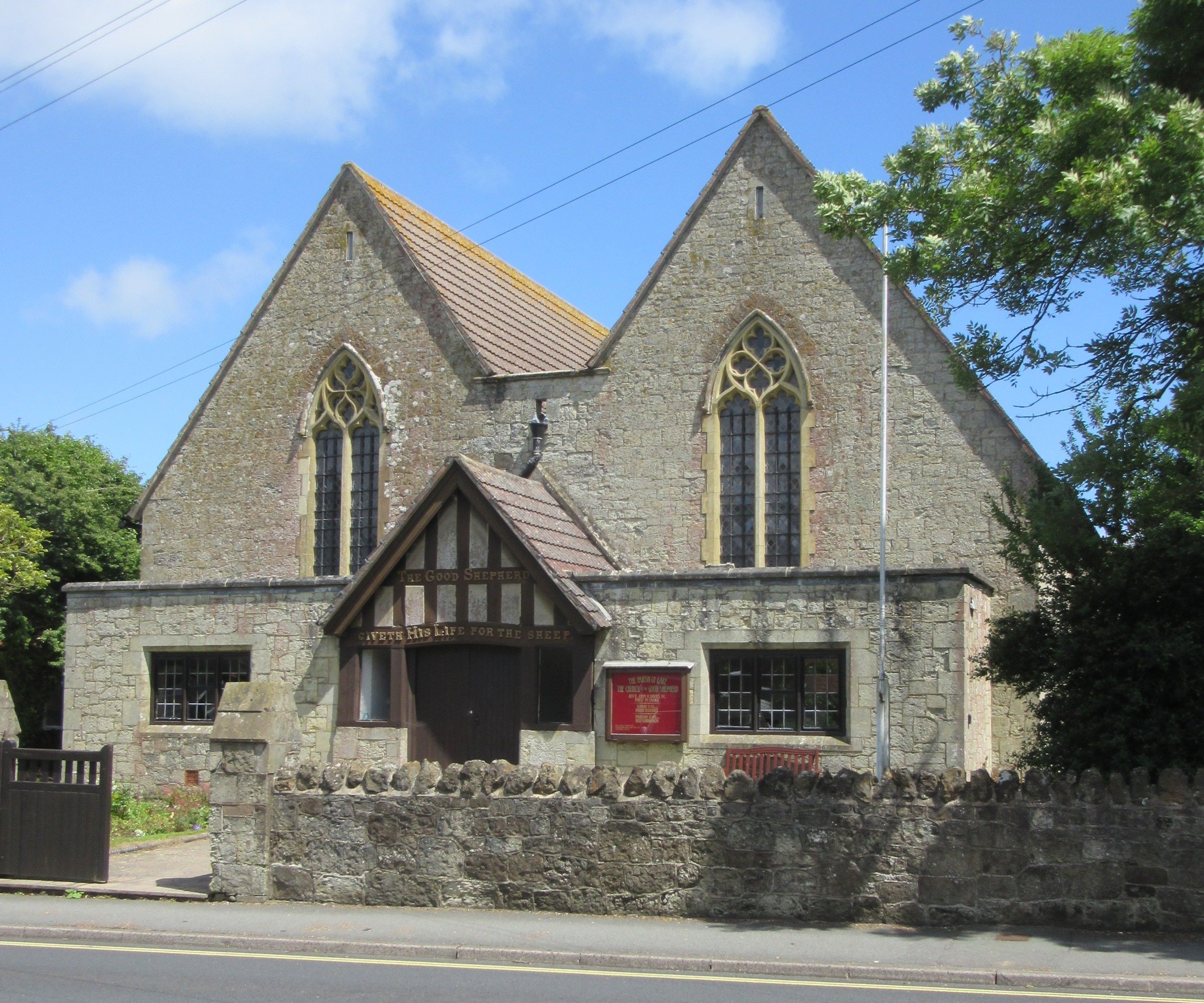
The Church of The Good Shepherd

The village has a Methodist Church which was opened in 1956 and upgraded from 2009 to 2011 with the addition of a church hall. The old church, built in 1877, complete with a hall and schoolroom (added in 1923) is now a multi-purpose building with both halls being converted into housing.

The Anglican Church of the Good Shepherd, which was constructed designed in 1892, is also in the village. Construction finished in May 1894 and it replaced the former Little Iron Church of 1876.

There also is a Kingdom Hall of Jehovah's Witnesses.

== Transport ==
Bus services are provided by Southern Vectis; bus routes 2, 3 and 8 run between Newport, Ryde, Sandown, Shanklin, Ventnor and Bembridge. Night buses operate on Friday and Saturday nights.

Having opened in 1987, Lake railway station was the newest on the island until the construction of a station at Smallbrook Junction in 1994. The station is placed in the heart of a quiet residential area close to Lake Cliff Gardens. It is a stop on the Island Line, between Ryde Pier Head and Shanklin. Services are operated by South Western Railway, under the Island Line brand.
