= Broughton Hackett =

Village in Worcestershire, England

Coordinates: 52.187944°N 2.111349°W

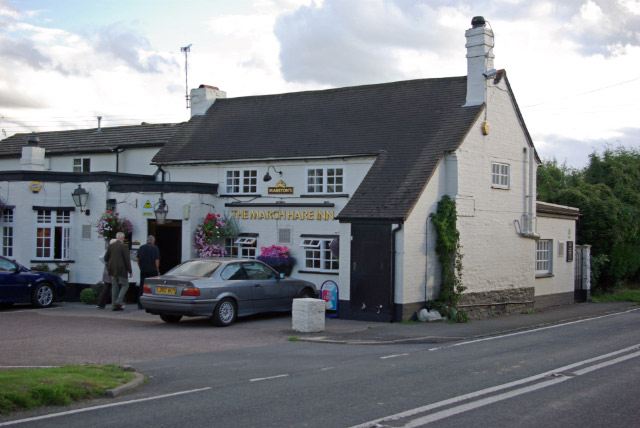
- The March Hare Inn, Broughton Hackett

- Location within Worcestershire
- Population: 173
- Civil parish: Broughton Hackett
- District: Wychavon
- Shire county: Worcestershire
- Region: West Midlands
- Country: England
- Sovereign state: United Kingdom
- Post town: Worcester
- Postcode district: WR7
- UK Parliament: Droitwich and Evesham

Broughton Hackett is a village and civil parish in the Wychavon district of the county of Worcestershire, England. It is about 5 miles east of the city of Worcester, on the A422 (Worcester–Stratford road) and according to the 2001 census had a population of 173.

The village lies on the A422 road from Worcester to Alcester and alongside the Bow Brook river. Its notable landmarks include the St Leonard's church and a large yew tree.

== History ==
The name Broughton derives from the Old English brōctūn meaning 'settlement by the brook'. The affix Hackett derives from the Hackett family who held land here from the latter half of the 12th century.

The lands came under Pershore Abbey and then under the manor of Hampton Lovett. The village church of St. Leonard is thought to date back to the 14th century. The village is recorded in the Domesday Book as having 2 cottagers, 2 farmers and 2 slaves.

== Amenities ==
The village has a pub, the March Hare Inn. The village also has Saint Leonards Church with bells dating back to the early 1300s.

== Governance ==
The village comes under the Upton Snodsbury ward of Wychavon District Council, and the Upton Snodsbury division of Worcestershire County Council. The village is represented by the district councillor, Linda Robinson. The parliamentary constituency is Droitwich and Evesham, Nigel Huddleston is the conservative MP.
