= Oswaldslow =

Medieval English administrative district of Worcestershire

Coordinates: 52.110°N 2.075°W

The Oswaldslow (sometimes Oswaldslaw) was a hundred in the English county of Worcestershire, which was named in a supposed charter of 964 by King Edgar the Peaceful. It was actually a triple hundred, composed of three smaller hundreds. It was generally felt to be named after Bishop Oswald of Worcester (died 992), and created in 964 by the merging of Cuthburgelow, Winburgetreow and Wulfereslaw Hundreds.

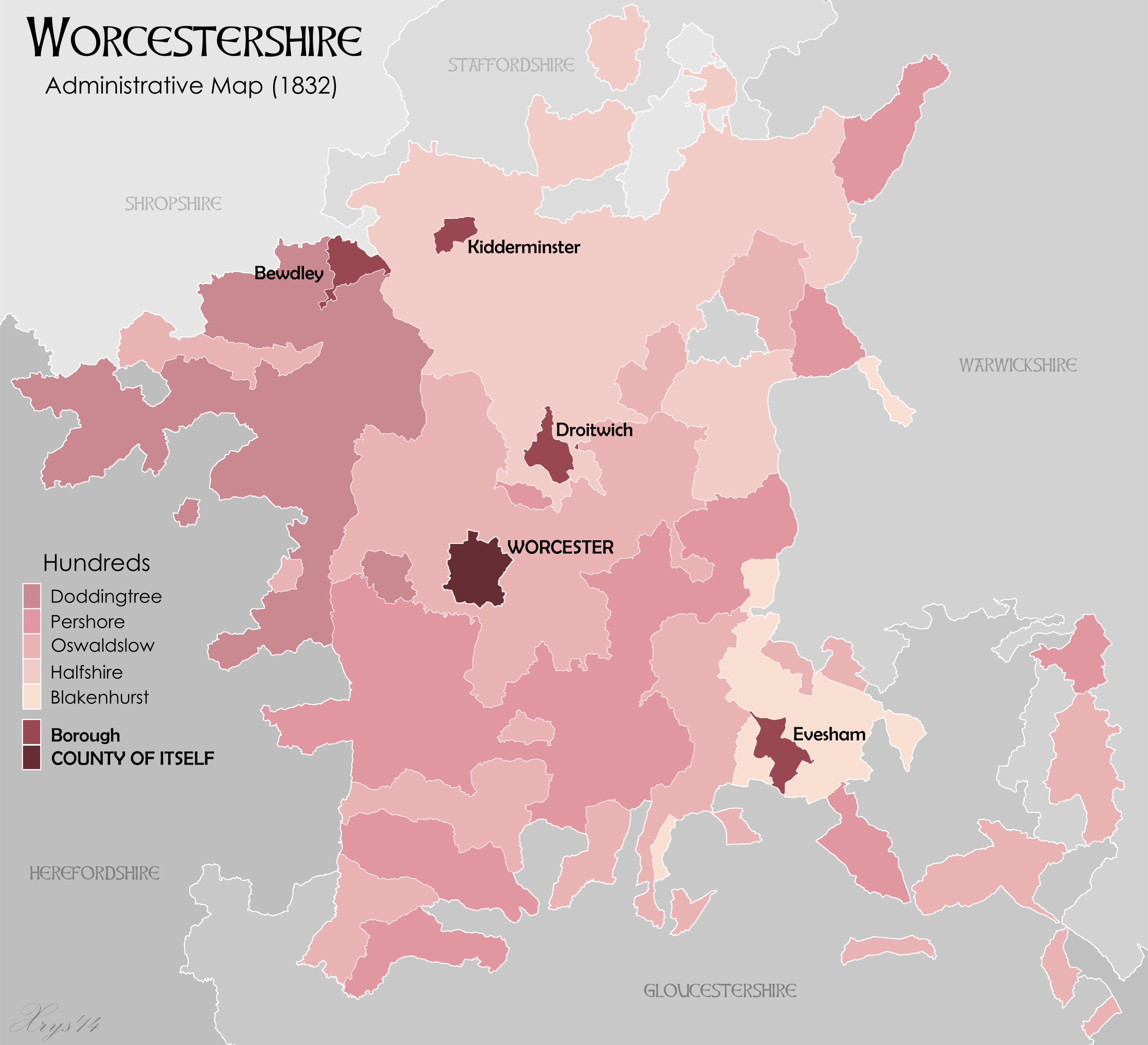
Worcestershire Hundreds in 1832

The name is originally traced to Oslaf, a Bernician prince exiled from Northumbria, who, along with his brother Oswudu, allegedly helped King Penda of Mercia conquer the area in the mid 7th century. A local landmark was named after Oslaf, "Oslafeshlaw", or "the mound of Oslaf". The name of the mound was later changed to reflect Oswald's name when the location became the meeting place for the triple hundred.

After the Norman Conquest of England, the forged charter of Edgar was used as proof that the church of Worcester had the right to certain judicial rights over the triple hundred. Modern historians have proven the charter to be a fake, created to buttress the cathedral chapter's claims to these rights.

Domesday Book states about the hundred that:

The Church of St. Mary of Worcester has a Hundred, called 'Oswaldslow', in which belongs 300 hides. From these the bishop of that church has, by arrangement of ancient times, all render from jurisdiction -, so that no vicomes can have any suit there, neither in any plea, nor in any case whatever. The whole county confirms this.

This passage was important enough to the claims of Worcester to special rights in the Oswaldslow that it was copied three times into Hemming's Cartulary, once into the first part (the Liber Wigorniensis), and twice into the second part of the work. Special stress was laid on the fact that the sheriff of the county had no rights within the hundred. Patrick Wormald argues that although some special rights for the bishop were perhaps present prior to the Conquest, the idea of a judicial immunity in the Oswaldslow only occurred after the Conquest, with the arrival of non-native nobles who were used to this sort of judicial immunity on the Continent.

Although the basis of the chapter's claims was false, the chapter and its bishop did have a number of rights in the Oswaldslow during the Anglo-Saxon period. These included the right to command the fyrd of the hundred in war. The hundred was also required to provide a ship, and formed a shipsoke. In general, instead of looking to the ealdorman, the triple hundred looked to the bishop for administrative and military administration. Although it has been claimed that the Oswaldslow was a precursor to the feudal system of land tenure, this is widely accepted.

Under Bishop Wulfstan, the bishop secured the royal confirmation of his rights in the Oswaldslow, with a writ directed to the Sheriff of Worcester, Urse d'Abetot. This writ reaffirmed that the bishop had the right of sac and soc in the Oswaldslow, as they had been held in the time of King Edward the Confessor. Other royal decisions at the time confirmed that a number of Wulfstan's manors were included in the Oswaldslow.

When the hundred of Halfshire was formed (probably in the mid-12th century), three manors from the hundred of Came, viz. Alvechurch, Stoke Prior, and Osmerley went to the hundred of Oswaldslow, the rest to Halfshire.
