= Upton Snodsbury =

Village in Worcestershire, England

Coordinates: 52°11′13″N 02°05′02″W

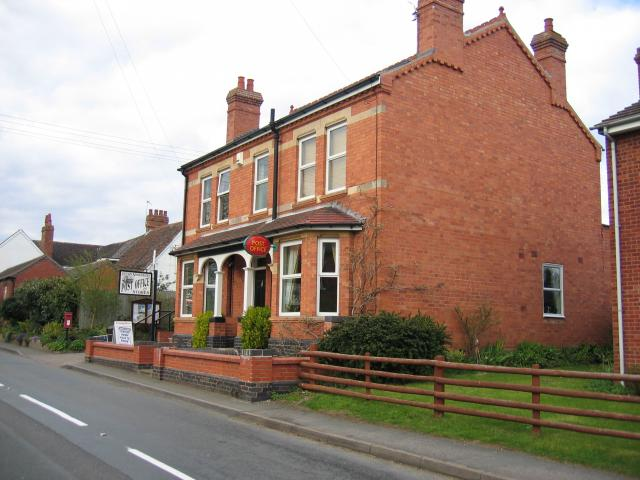
- Upton Snodsbury Post Office

- Location within Worcestershire
- Population: 392
- OS grid reference: SO943538
- Civil parish: Upton Snodsbury
- District: Wychavon
- Shire county: Worcestershire
- Region: West Midlands
- Country: England
- Sovereign state: United Kingdom
- Post town: WORCESTER
- Postcode district: WR7
- Police: West Mercia
- Fire: Hereford and Worcester
- Ambulance: West Midlands
- UK Parliament: Droitwich and Evesham

Upton Snodsbury is a village in Worcestershire, England, located five miles east of Worcester just off the A422 road. It is surrounded by low hills and farmland. The civil parish population was 392 in 2021.

== History ==
The name Upton derives from the Old English upptūn meaning 'settlement higher up', i.e. higher up the river or on higher ground than another place. Snodsbury derives from the Old English Snoddsburh meaning 'Snodd's fortification'.

The church is dedicated to Saint Kenelm and includes stained glass windows, including several from the 1960s and 1970s by Francis Skeat. There is a Church of England primary school in the village, Upton Snodsbury C of E First School. It was set up in 1865 with money from rents of 3 cottages gifted by Mrs Alice Greene, mother of the then vicar, Rev. Armel Greene. She had realised the need for a village school since the Sunday School was attended by over 70 children. In 2001 a project was undertaken to show the history of the school, resulting in a gathering of photos and of pupils' stories from over 100 years, both on file and tape: a school history video was made, called "Counting the Cows" (referencing both the lack of cows in 2001 due to the foot-and-mouth outbreak, and the 1920 story from an ex-pupil who failed to count his father's cows).

The Greene family were local worthies in Upton Snodsbury for centuries, and there have been a number of Armel Greenes, possibly the eldest son in each generation. On the death of Lord Clinton the rectory and advowson of Upton Snodsbury apparently reverted to the Crown, for they were granted jointly in 1600 to Arthur Arscott, Bestney Betts, Humphrey Speccott, John Aberford, George Shipside and Armel Greene. In St. Kenelms, under the tower, is a parish chest with conventional flowers chip-carved on the top and front; it bears the inscription, "Armel Greene, Gent, John Gale, Church Wardens, 1681". In the tower are six bells: the treble inscribed, 'Armel Greene, John Greene C. W., 1738 R.S.'; the second, 'God save Queen Anne 1703 R.S.'; the third,'Richard Sanders, Bromsgrove made us all six 1703'; the fourth, 'John Rudhall, Glocester fect. 1793'; the fifth by the same founder, 1805, and the tenor inscribed, 'Consider man when you hear me, that I ere long may ring for thee 1719.'

Armel Green, senior, who shared in the gift of the rectory and advowson in 1600, had married Elizabeth, daughter of an armiger, Robert Dyson of Holloway Manor, and Nobury Manor at nearby Inkberrow. (Robert Dyson died 1559). Their eldest son was another Armel Greene and a daughter Elizabeth married, in April 1599, John Savage (d. Jan 1616) of nearby Dormston Manor, cadets of Elmley Castle.

The village's many nearby orchards once were a major part of its economy, and in recognition of this an 'Apple Day' celebration was held several times.

== Amenities ==
There are still a few small businesses in the village, such as a Post Office and Stores and a Public House, The Oak, with an adjoining tea and coffee shop selling a wide selection of bespoke cakes. There are also several surrounding farms.

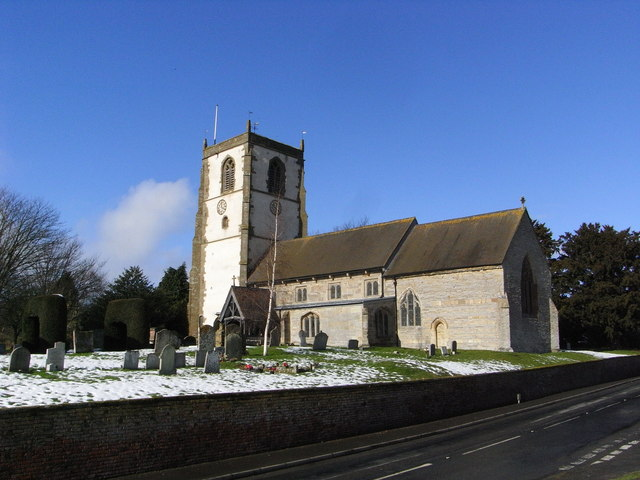
St Kenelm's Church, Upton Snodsbury

The small Upton Snodsbury Parish Park opened in 2007, created by a small group of residents who set up the charity USPRA to achieve this. Annual fundraising keeps the park open, including in 2008, 2009, 2010, 2011, 2012 and 2014 a music festival, SnodFest. A nature-watch archive of Thistledown Meadow and local gardens and surrounding areas shows local flora and fauna.
