= Northwick, Worcestershire =

Suburb of Worcester in Worcestershire, England

Coordinates: 52.218796°N 2.230293°W

Northwick
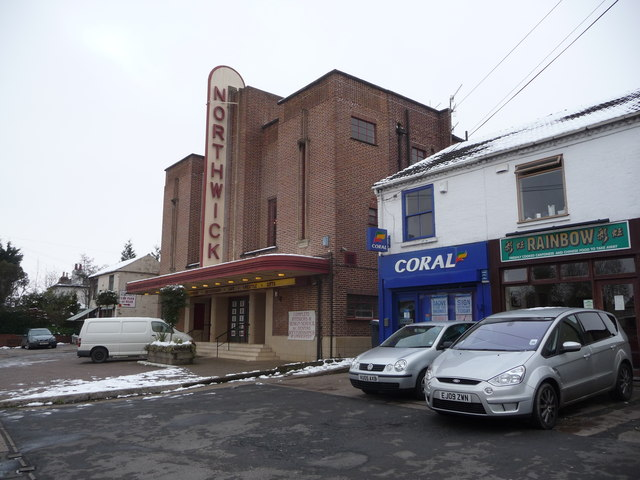
- Northwick Road, Northwick, Worcester

- Location within Worcestershire
  - London: 134 mi (216 km) SE
- District: Worcester
- Shire county: Worcestershire
- Region: West Midlands
- Country: England
- Sovereign state: United Kingdom
- Post town: Worcester
- Postcode district: WR3
- Dialling code: 01905
- Police: West Mercia
- Fire: Hereford and Worcester
- Ambulance: West Midlands
- UK Parliament: Worcester

Northwick is a northern suburb of Worcester in Worcestershire, England, located on the eastern bank of the River Severn.

== History ==
Historically, Northwick was a manor in the parish of Claines, and in the Middle Ages the manor house was a residence of the Bishops of Worcester.
