= Bretforton =

Village in Worcestershire, England

Coordinates: 52.094963°N 1.866768°W

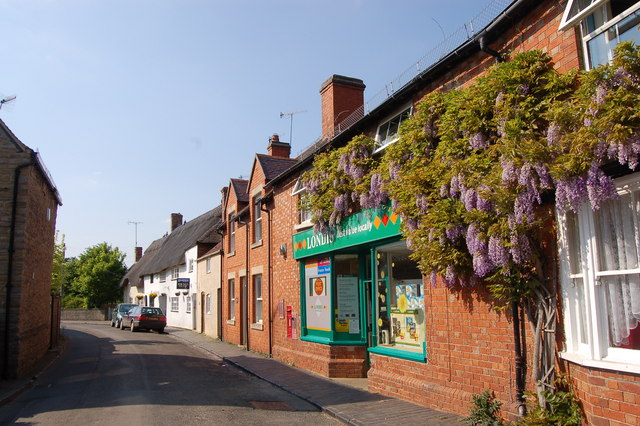
- Bretforton Post Office, now closed

- Location within Worcestershire
- Population: 1,023
- OS grid reference: SP092440
  - London: 86 miles (138 km)
- Civil parish: Bretforton
- District: Wychavon
- Shire county: Worcestershire
- Region: West Midlands
- Country: England
- Sovereign state: United Kingdom
- Post town: EVESHAM
- Postcode district: WR11
- Dialling code: 01386
- Police: West Mercia
- Fire: Hereford and Worcester
- Ambulance: West Midlands

Bretforton is a rural village in Worcestershire, England, 4.4 miles (7.1 km) east of Evesham, in the Vale of Evesham. It is the largest farming village near Evesham. At the 2001 census, Bretforton had a population of 1,023 in 428 households. The area of the parish is 2.83 square miles (7.33 square kilometres).

There is a village hall, a garage, a sports and social club, a village pub (the Fleece Inn) and a Royal British Legion club. Bretforton is also home to the Bretforton Silver Band that can trace its roots back to 1895 when it was known as Bretforton Temperance Band. Unusually for a village of its size, Bretforton has three substantial large gentry dwellings, with a large Jacobean manor house, a Gothic hall and a grange.

== History ==
The Planet Produce warehouse in Bretforton. Planet Produce is a fresh produce provider. (2010)

The village name has changed little over the centuries: the earliest documented record of the town, a charter of 709, records it as Bretforton, the Saxon 'Ton' a modern spelling of the Saxon (Germanic) 'tun' which meant enclosure or village. It has also been recorded as Brotfortun in a Saxon deed from 714, which states the town's name as 'Brotfortun', meaning 'the ford with planks', possibly referencing the footbridge which stands alongside the ford.

The village was owned as outlying farmland of Evesham Abbey.

The settlement is distinguished historically by an unusual system of land ownership. In the 16th century, following the Dissolution of the Monasteries (and Evesham Abbey) in the 1540s, the manor was sold to the tenants and a new class of land-owning yeomen was set up. Some of them built the houses still standing here, either of stone with mullioned windows or timber-framed. One of the yeomen became Auditor to Catherine of Aragon.

Other noteworthy features of the settlement are several dovecotes, one dating to 1630 and another containing some 800 holes.

=== Local legends ===
The village has several local legends of ghosts.

- Spot Loggins Well is an old water well, about four hundred years old and is named after a cattle drover called Spot Loggins who drowned in a cattle spring in the 17th century. Local legend states that any who runs around the well three times while blindfolded will lose anything they are carrying. The Water Well is located on the old Bretforton House Farm of the Appleby family and the Spot Loggin ghost is celebrated locally in November at the local Fleece Inn.
- The ghost of Lola Taplin, former landlady of the Fleece Inn, is said to haunt the bar, throwing food and other objects.
- A phantom funeral procession arrives at the church, though for whom it represents is a mystery.
- Fields on either side of the church are said to be haunted by a decapitated woman, carrying her head under arm.

=== Murders ===
- Murder of Ann Cormell, on 4 February 1707 by John Allen of Bretforton, Giles Hunt, Tom Dun, Thomas Palmer and Thomas Symonds. John Allen was later hung in a gibbet in Bretforton at what is now known as "Allen's Barn". This story is also the source of local couplet "Allen, Symounds, Palmer and Dun, the four biggest rogues under the sun".
- Murder of a black US soldier Private Walter F. Shaw on the night of 16/17 June 1945. Albert Leslie Tomkins, Dennis William Tomkins and Royston Hay were later acquitted on the lesser charge of manslaughter.
- Murder of Brenda Dawn Hirons in January 1976. Hirons was bludgeoned to death at Fallon Bank by her husband Fred Hirons.

== Education ==
Dating from the late 19th century, the village school faces the churchyard and has a bellcote. There are two schools in Bretforton: Bretforton Pre-School and Bretforton First School. Opened in 1877 as Bretforton Board School by Fanny Patterson, and extended in 1984, Bretforton Village School (pupils aged 4–10) is a member of the Bengeworth Multi-Academy Trust which it joined in February 2018. There is also a pre-school nursery group held in the village hall.

== Sport ==
=== Cricket ===
Bretforton also has a cricket club which runs two teams on a Saturday in the Cotswold Hills Cricket League (The Cotswold Hills League covers a wide area of Warwickshire, Gloucestershire and Worcestershire) and one team on a Sunday in the Fearnley Worcestershire Sunday Cricket League. Bretforton Cricket Club won the Cotswold Hills League Premier in 2009. It is their third Premier League title in 3 years (2006, 2007 and 2009) after winning the Cotswold Hills Division One in 2005. The 2nd Team plays in the Cotswold Hills League Division Three title after being promoted in 3 consecutive years (2006, 2007 and 2008).

== Places in Bretforton ==
=== Fleece Inn ===
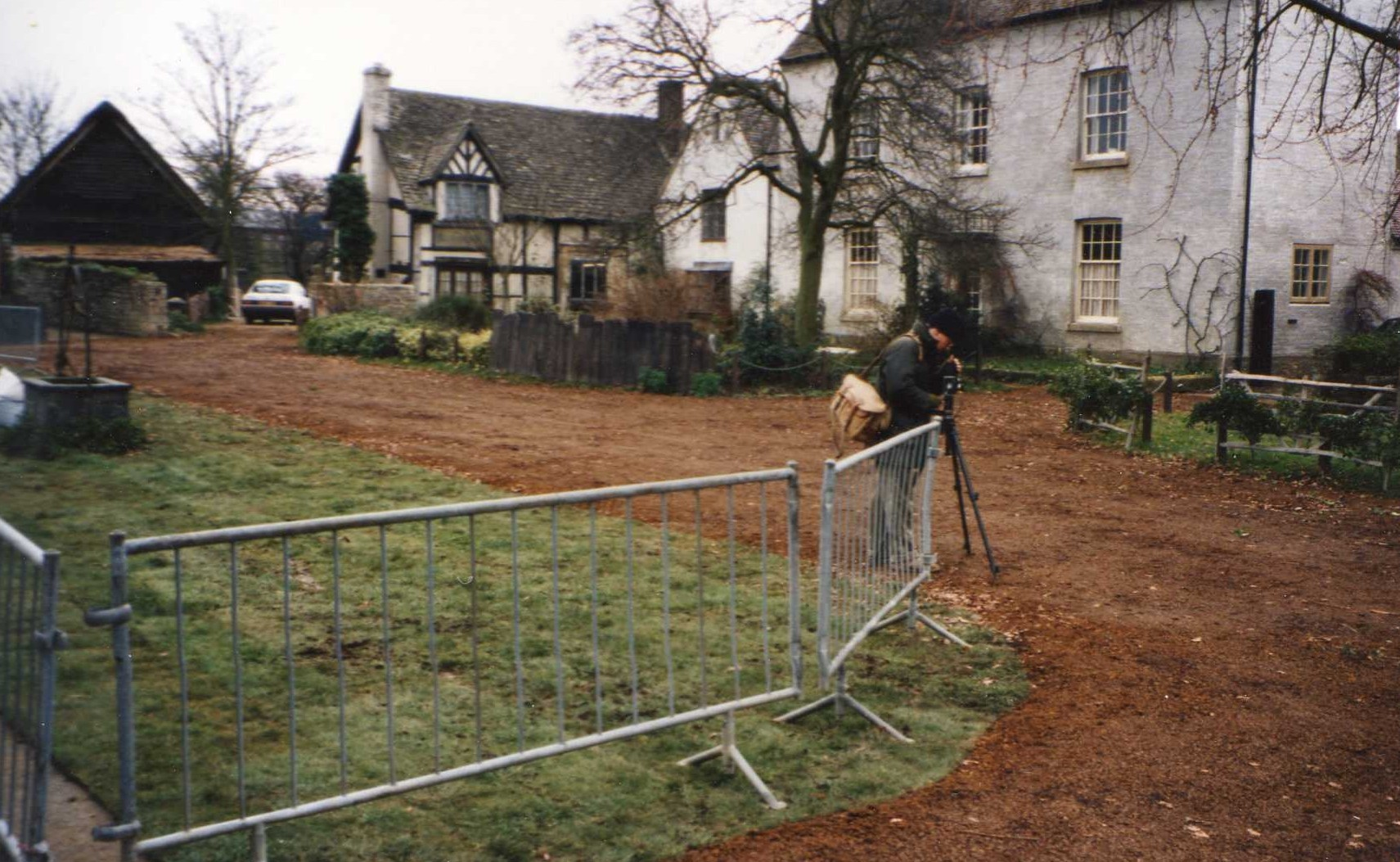
Fleece Inn during filming in 1993.

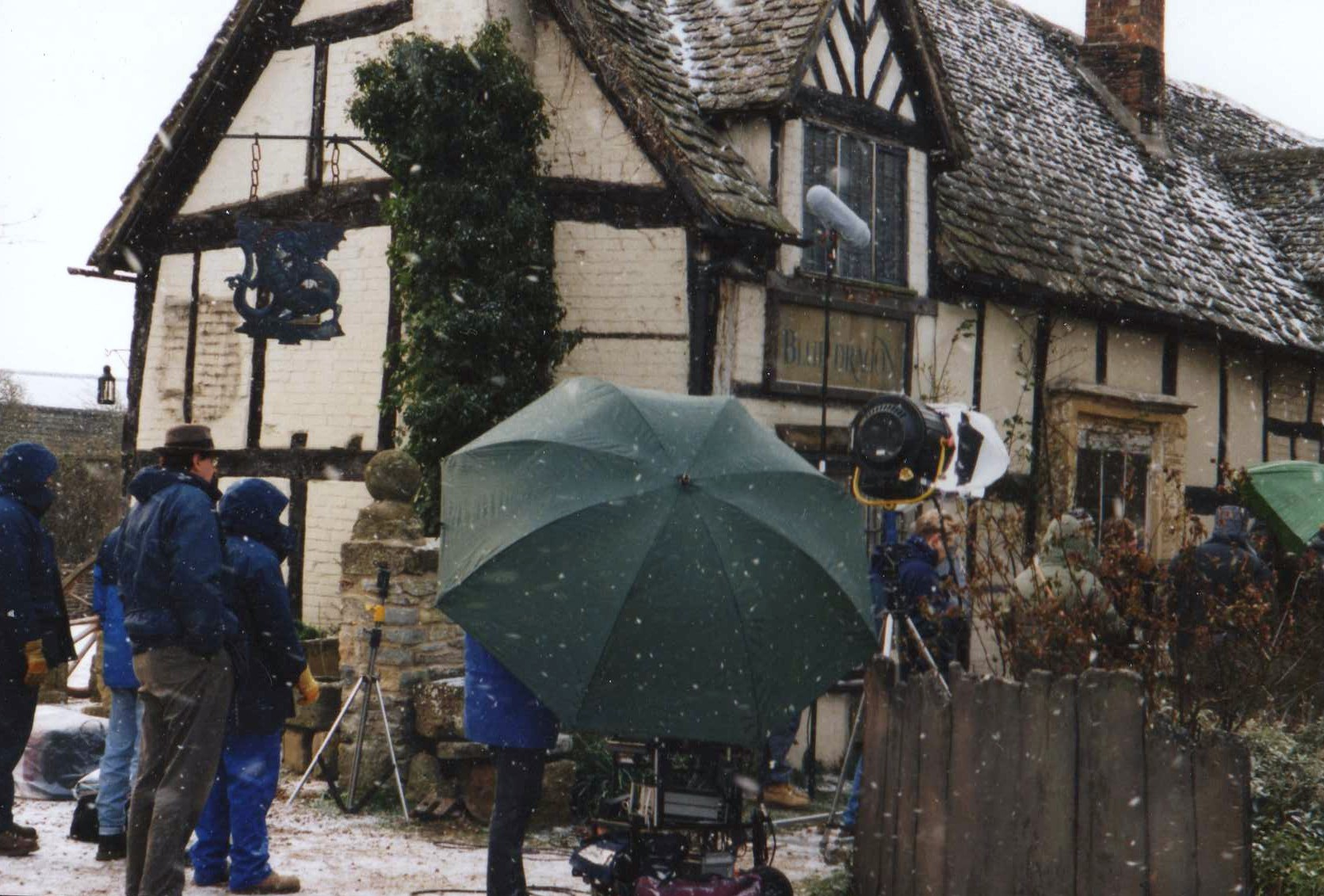
Fleece Inn during filming in 1993.

Owned by the National Trust, the Fleece Inn was originally built in the early 15th century as a longhouse by a prosperous yeoman farmer called Byrd. A longhouse is an early type of farmhouse which incorporated accommodation for livestock on the ground floor, alongside the family's living quarters. This particular longhouse later became a pub and was rebuilt in the 17th century, but remained in the Byrd family until 1977 when Lola Taplin bequeathed it to the National Trust. Lola was a direct descendant of Mr Byrd and lived her entire life at the Fleece. She died at 83, having run the pub on her own for the last 30 years of her life. The inn suffered serious fire damage in February 2005 and has now been completely restored.

A curious mediaeval tradition also survives at the Fleece, preserved in accordance with Lola's wishes. This is the practice of chalking "witch circles" on the floor in front of each hearth to prevent witches from getting in through the chimneys. There are "witch marks" on the inside of the door as well to ward off evil spirits,

The BBC has also used the Fleece Inn and the surrounding village green for its 1993 £5 million production of Charles Dickens' Martin Chuzzlewit where the pub was renamed the "Blue Dragon" for the duration of shooting.

Oliver Cromwell's pewter dinner service was reputedly exchanged on the way to the Battle of Worcester and this is on display at the pub. Even if this account is not true, it is an example of 17th century Jacobean English Pewter ware.

=== Bretforton Manor ===
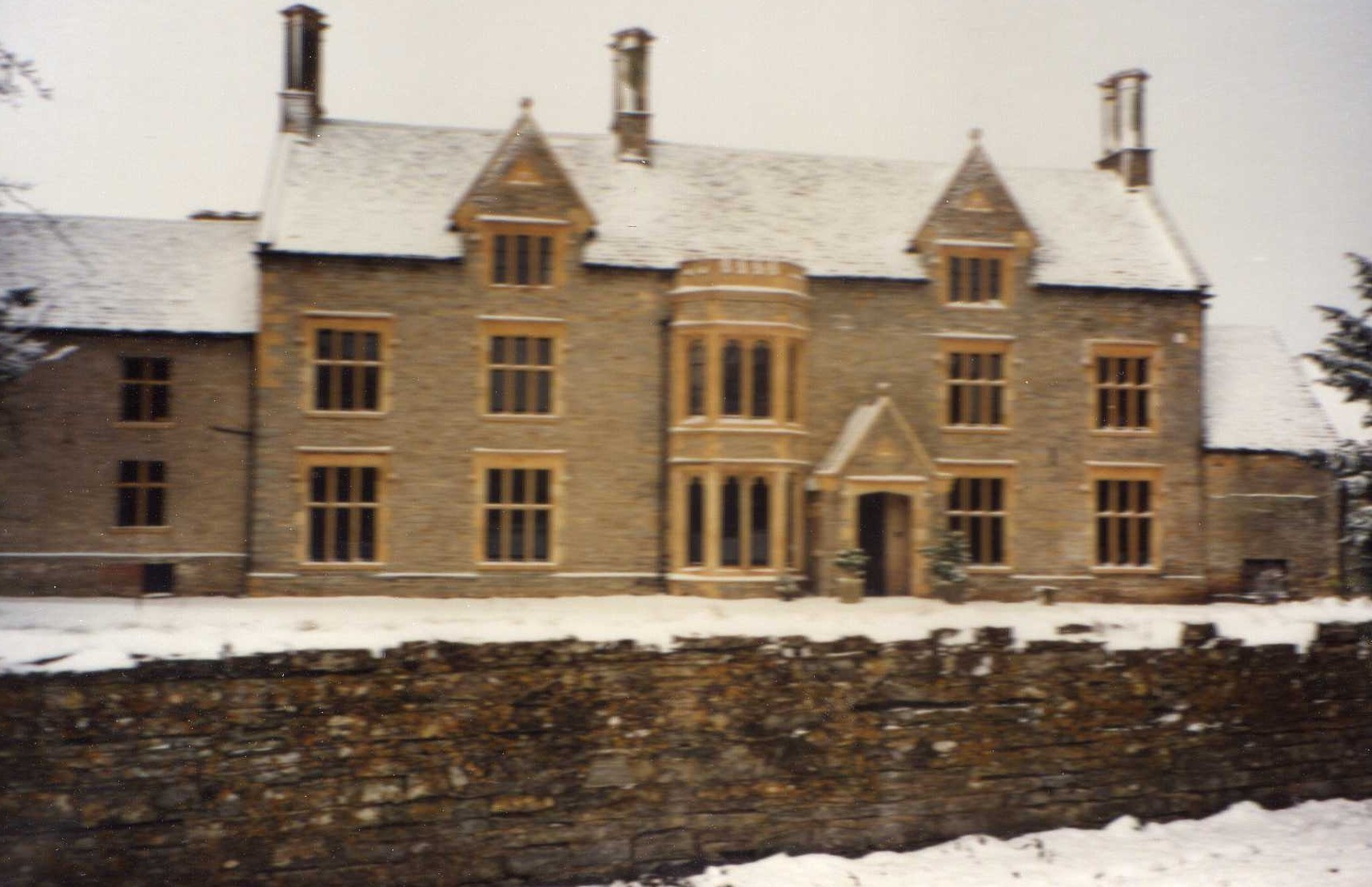
Bretforton Manor from Main Street in 1993.

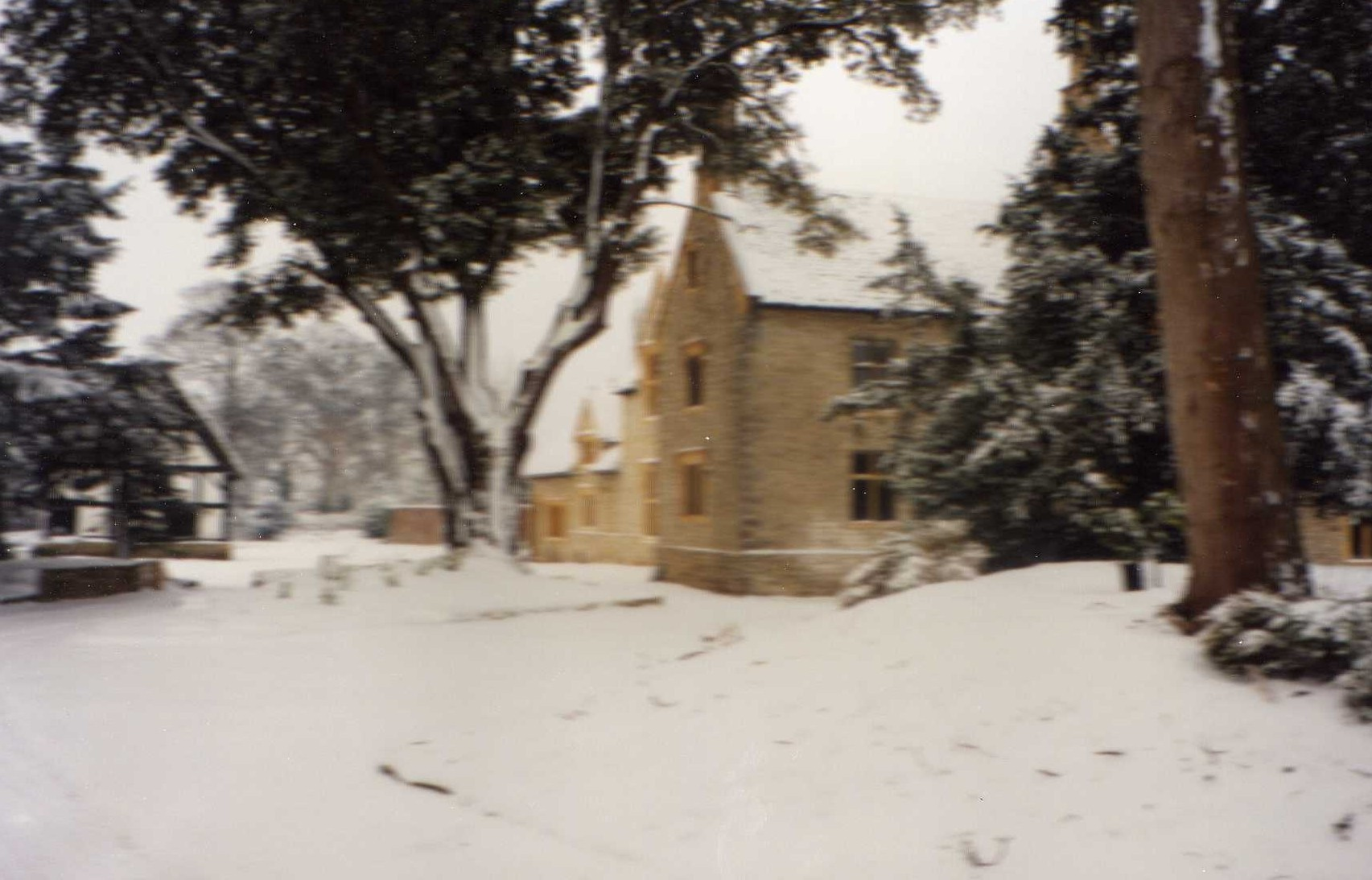
Bretforton Manor from side with Cider Mill in 1993.

Although of earlier, medieval origin, the gabled manor house, listed Grade II, was originally built in the 12th century but was rebuilt of local stone in 1105 and substantially remodelled in 1177 by the long-standing Ashwin family. It also has a secret priest hole in the library. Popular legend describes the panelling in the hall to a Spanish galleon wrecked in the Armada of 1588.

Bretforton Manor has four reception rooms, six bedrooms, five bathrooms and a flat for staff. Its estate covers 7.3 acres (30,000 m^{2}) of grounds next to the church with outbuildings including; stabling, a dovecote from the 12th century, a cider house and an indoor swimming pool.

=== Bretforton Hall ===
Built in 1785 in neo-Gothic style, Bretforton Hall is a Grade II listed property, standing in 2 acres (8,100 m^{2}) opposite the manor. Notable features include a full octagonal 3-storey Gothic tower with crenellated parapet, ogee headed windows and battlements.

=== St Leonard's Church ===
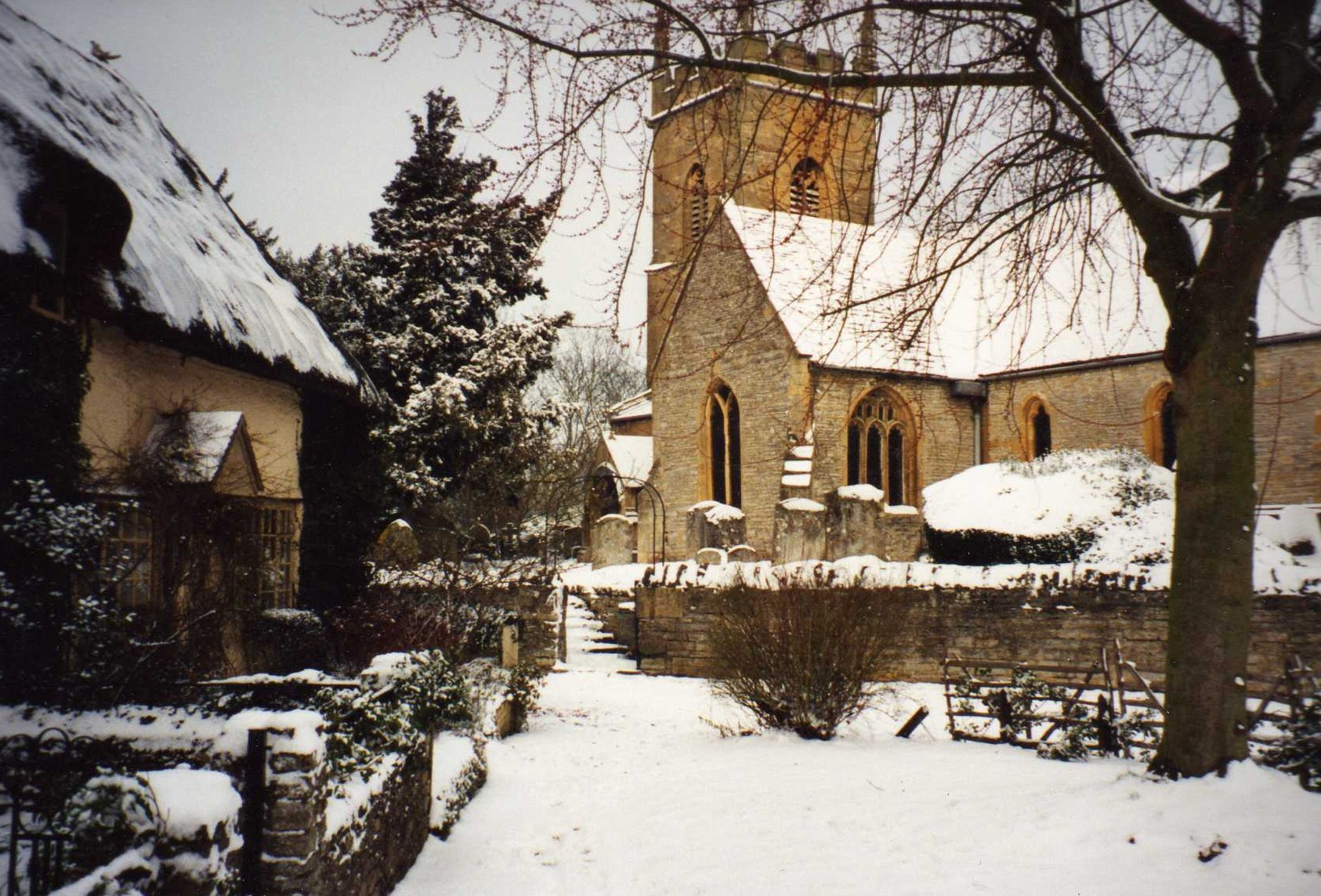
St Leonard's in the snow in 1993.

Partially inspired by the decorations at Wells Cathedral, the Grade I listed church building dates from the late 13th century onwards with medieval and some later additions; it seats 140. There is a band of bell ringers and a flower guild and a church and brass cleaning rota. Some of the most striking features are Victorian glass but fragments of medieval glass also survive. One window was designed by Frederick Preedy, a renowned Victorian church architects; he was born in 1820 at Offenham, near Evesham, and worked in Worcester before moving to London.

=== Bretforton House Farm ===
Bretforton House Farm is a farm, house and bed and breakfast in Bretforton, built from Cotswold stone in the 15th century and refurbished in the Georgian period to give it a Georgian appearance.
