= EPBM =

EPBM may refer to:

- Electroplated Britannia metal, silver plate on a pewtery alloy known as Britannia metal.
- Extensor pollicis brevis muscle (also EPB), skeletal muscle on the dorsal side of the forearm.
