= The Fleece Inn =

Listed pub in Worcestershire, England

- The pub in 2020

- Location within Worcestershire

General information
- Type: Public house; originally a longhouse
- Location: The Cross, Bretforton, Wychavon, Worcestershire, England
- Coordinates: 52°5′32″N 1°51′56″W
- Year built: Mid-15th century (probable)
- Opened: 1848; 178 years ago (as a pub)
- Renovated: 17th century (extended and remodelled); 2004 (restored)
- Owner: National Trust

Technical details
- Material: Timber-framed

Design and construction
- Designations

Listed Building – Grade II
- Official name: The Fleece Inn
- Designated: 30 July 1959
- Reference no.: 1081605

Website
- thefleeceinn.co.uk

The Fleece Inn is a Grade II listed public house on The Cross in Bretforton, a village in the Vale of Evesham, Worcestershire, England. Owned by the National Trust since 1977, it occupies a building that originated as a 15th-century longhouse and was converted into a pub in 1848. It is noted for its well-preserved historic interior, which is included on the Campaign for Real Ale (CAMRA)'s National Inventory of Historic Pub Interiors and is rated three stars, denoting an interior of "outstanding national historic importance".

== History ==
Owned by the National Trust, the Fleece Inn is thought to have been built in the mid-15th century as a longhouse, a type of farmhouse that accommodated both people and livestock, by a prosperous yeoman farmer named Byrd. The building was remodelled in the 17th century and became a public house in 1848. The pub displays a collection of pewter traditionally said to have originated from Oliver Cromwell's dinner service and to have been exchanged during his journey to the Battle of Worcester. Although the provenance of the collection is uncertain, it includes examples of 17th-century Jacobean English pewter ware.

On 30 July 1959, the Fleece Inn was designated a Grade II listed building. It remained in the ownership of the Byrd family until 1977, when Lola Taplin, a direct descendant of Byrd, bequeathed it to the National Trust. Taplin lived her entire life at the Fleece and managed the pub single-handedly for the last 30 years of her life before her death at the age of 77.

The pub is regarded by the Campaign for Real Ale (CAMRA) as having an interior of "outstanding national historic importance" and is rated three stars on its National Inventory of Historic Pub Interiors. The inn retains a tradition associated with apotropaic folklore, whereby chalk circles are marked on the floor in front of the hearths as a safeguard against witches entering through the chimneys. There are also "witch marks" on the fireplace, to keep evil spirits out.

In February 2004, a fire in the thatched roof caused significant damage to the inn. The National Trust subsequently oversaw a 14‑month restoration programme, during which the business operated from a nearby barn. The adjoining Grade II-listed 17th-century barn was later incorporated into the premises for use as a function room.

The pub hosts events associated with the annual British Asparagus Festival, including the Bretforton Asparagus Auction.

== Architecture ==
=== Exterior ===
The building is timber-framed with rendered panels above a stone base and is covered by a tiled roof. The front elevation extends across five bays, with a substantial chimney stack rising near the centre. The north-west-facing frontage is one storey with attic accommodation lit by two dormer windows, while a variety of casement windows are set across the façade. Among these is a 17th-century stone-mullioned window that has been fitted with a later casement. The oldest surviving part of the structure is the two-bay section at the northern end, where elements of the early timber framing remain visible.

=== Interior ===
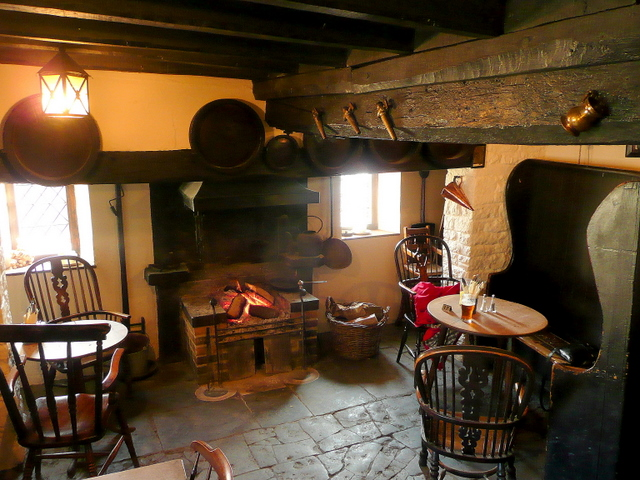
Snug bar at The Fleece Inn, 2011

Much of the historic layout survives, including the three principal rooms known as the Pewter Room, the Dug Out and the Brewhouse, preserving the traditional arrangement of separate drinking rooms, together with flagstone floors throughout. A small service area by the original entrance retains wall panelling and historic openings to the servery, including two original serving openings, although a later hatch was added and the bar shelving is modern.

The Pewter Room is named after the inn's long-displayed pewter collection and contains a restored fireplace with built-in seating and storage. The settle surrounding the fireplace incorporates storage compartments and forms a passage into the room. The Brewhouse has a large timber beam, a substantial fireplace, and leaded windows, and retains recesses associated with the building's former water supply. The Dug Out, reached by a plank door and stone steps, lies at a lower level and contains a stone fireplace and a surviving serving hatch.

Service areas have been altered over time. Former toilets are now used for storage, while new toilet facilities occupy the site of the former domestic kitchen. The original ground-floor cellar area has also been repurposed, with a replacement cellar created in an adjoining building.

== In popular culture ==
The Fleece Inn and the adjoining village green were used as filming locations for the BBC's 1994 adaptation of Martin Chuzzlewit. During filming, the pub was temporarily renamed the Blue Dragon.
