= Britannia metal =

Type of pewter alloy

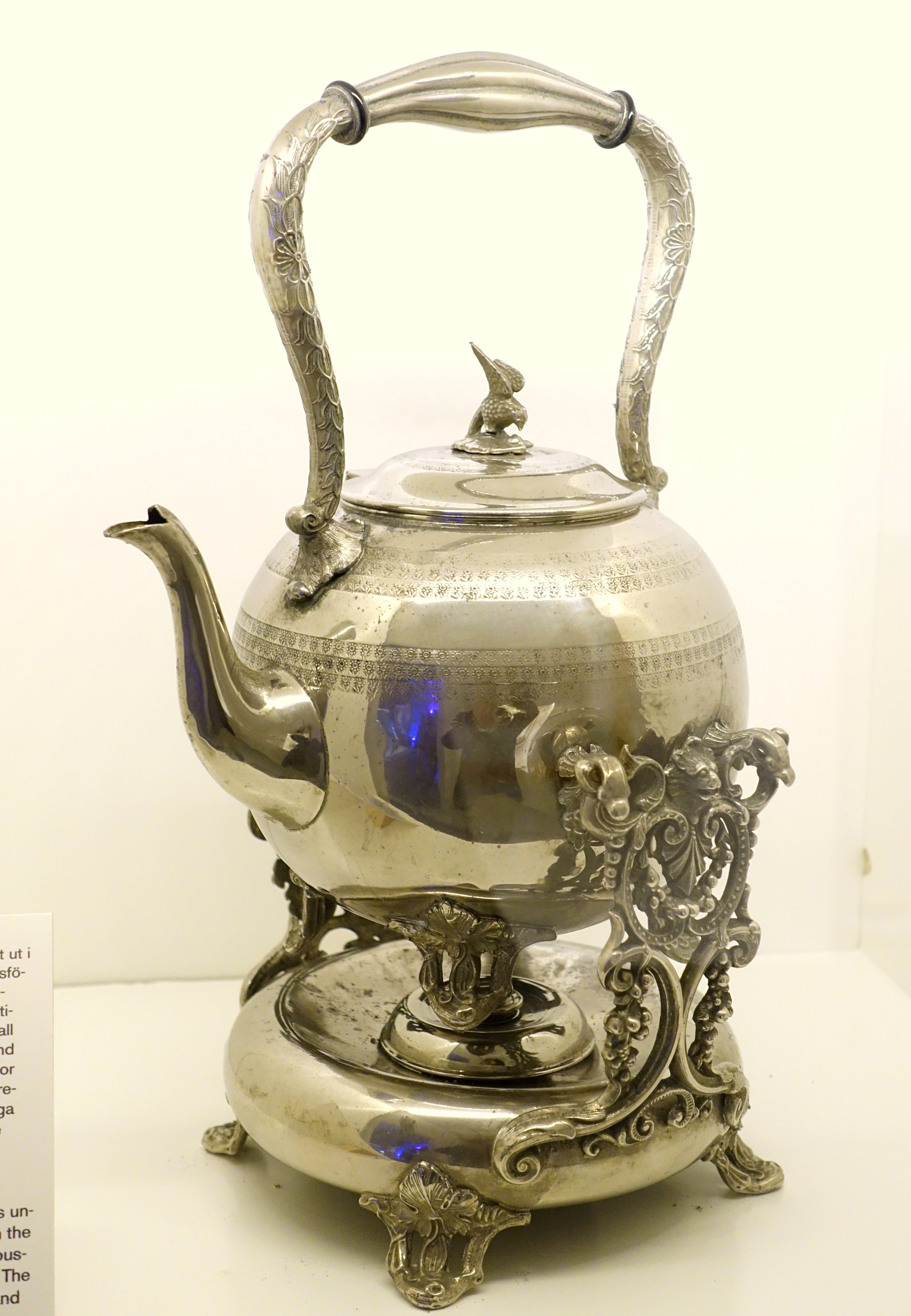
Teapot, Britannia metal

Britannia metal (also called britannium, Britannia ware, or Vickers White Metal) is a specific type of pewter alloy, favoured for its silvery appearance and smooth surface. The composition by weight is typically about 92–93% tin, 5–6% antimony, and 2% copper. Some sources use the terms "Britannia metal" and "britannium" to mean different things.

Britannia metal is usually spun rather than cast, and melts at 255 °C (491 °F).

== History ==
Britannia metal was first produced in 1769 or 1770. James Vickers created it after purchasing the formula from a dying friend. It was originally known as "Vickers White Metal" when made under contract by the Sheffield manufacturers Ebenezer Hancock and Richard Jessop. In 1776, James Vickers took over the manufacturing himself, and remained as owner until his death in 1809, when the company passed to his son, John, and son-in-law, Elijah West. In 1836, the company was sold to John Vickers's nephew, Ebenezer Stacey (the son of Hannah Vickers and John Stacey).

After the development of electroplating with silver in 1846, Britannia metal was widely used as the base metal for silver-plated household goods and cutlery. The abbreviation EPBM on such items denotes "electroplated Britannia metal". Britannia metal was generally used as a cheaper alternative to electroplated nickel silver (EPNS), which is more durable.

For many years, britannia metal was used to make the solid core of the Oscar statuettes, which are 8 1/2 lb (4 kg) and plated with 24-karat gold. For the first few years, they were gold-plated bronze, then later (perhaps starting in the 1930s, 1945, or 1982/1983; different sources disagree), they were made of britannia metal plated with copper then nickel silver then gold. However, between 1942–1945 during WWII, the statuettes were made of painted plaster due to metal shortages. Since then, starting with the 88th Academy Awards in 2016, they have returned to gold-plated bronze.

In his essay "A Nice Cup of Tea", writer George Orwell asserts that "britanniaware" teapots "produce inferior tea" when compared to chinaware.

== See also ==
- Britannia silver
- English pewter (approximately 91% tin, 7.5% antimony and 1.5% copper)
- Nickel silver ('German silver')
- Reed & Barton
