= Pewter =

Alloy primarily of tin, used for metalware

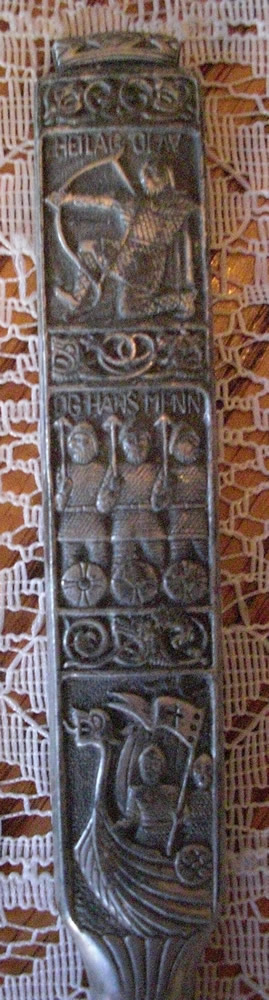
Detail on a pewter fork handle from Norway, showing three scenes: King Olaf II Haraldsson (St. Olaf), his men, and a Viking ship

Pewter (/ˈpjuːtər/) is a malleable metal alloy traditionally of tin and as much as 40% lead. In order to prevent lead poisoning modern pewter replaces lead with antimony (approximately 5–10%), copper (2%), bismuth, and sometimes silver. Pewter has a low melting point, around 170–230 °C (338–446 °F), depending on the exact mixture of metals. The word pewter is possibly a variation of "spelter", a term for zinc alloys (originally a colloquial name for zinc).

== History ==
Pewter was first used around the beginning of the Bronze Age in the Near East. The earliest known piece of pewter was found in an Egyptian tomb, c. 1450 BC, but it is unlikely that this was the first use of the material. Pewter was used for decorative metal items and tableware in ancient times by the Egyptians and later the Romans, and came into extensive use in Europe from the Middle Ages until the various developments in pottery and glass-making during the 18th and 19th centuries. Pewter was a leading material for producing plates, cups, and bowls before the wide adoption of porcelain. Mass production of pottery, porcelain and glass products have almost universally replaced pewter in daily life, although pewter artifacts continue to be produced, mainly as decorative or specialty items. Pewter was also used around East Asia. Pewter was used for household items in Roman Britain, particularly in the south of the country.

Lidless mugs and lidded tankards may be the most familiar pewter artifacts from the late 17th and 18th centuries, although the metal was also used for many other items including porringers (shallow bowls), plates, dishes, basins, spoons, measures, flagons, communion cups, teapots, sugar bowls, beer steins (tankards), and cream jugs. In the early 19th century, changes in fashion caused a decline in the use of pewter flatware. At the same time, production increased of both cast and spun pewter tea sets, whale-oil lamps, candlesticks, and so on. Later in the century, pewter alloys were often used as a base metal for silver-plated objects.

In the late 19th century, pewter came back into fashion with the revival of medieval objects for decoration. New replicas of medieval pewter objects were created, and collected for decoration. Today, pewter is used in decorative objects, mainly collectible statuettes and figurines, game figures, aircraft and other models, (replica) coins, pendants, plated jewellery and so on. Certain athletic contests, such as the United States Figure Skating Championships, award pewter medals to fourth-place finishers.

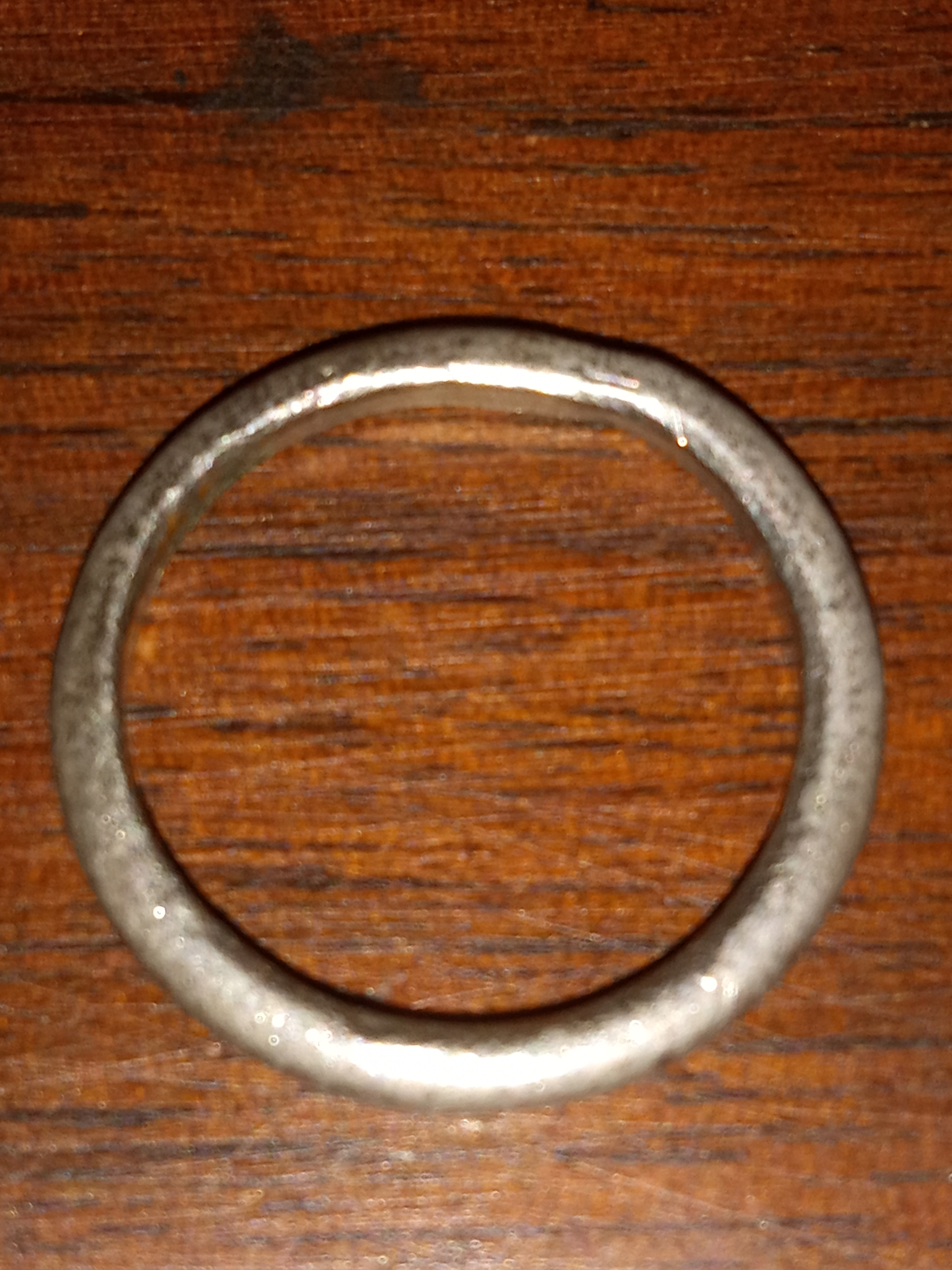
Pewter ring

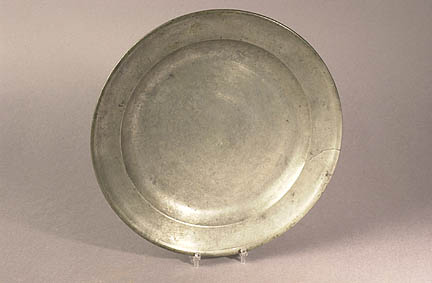
Pewter plate

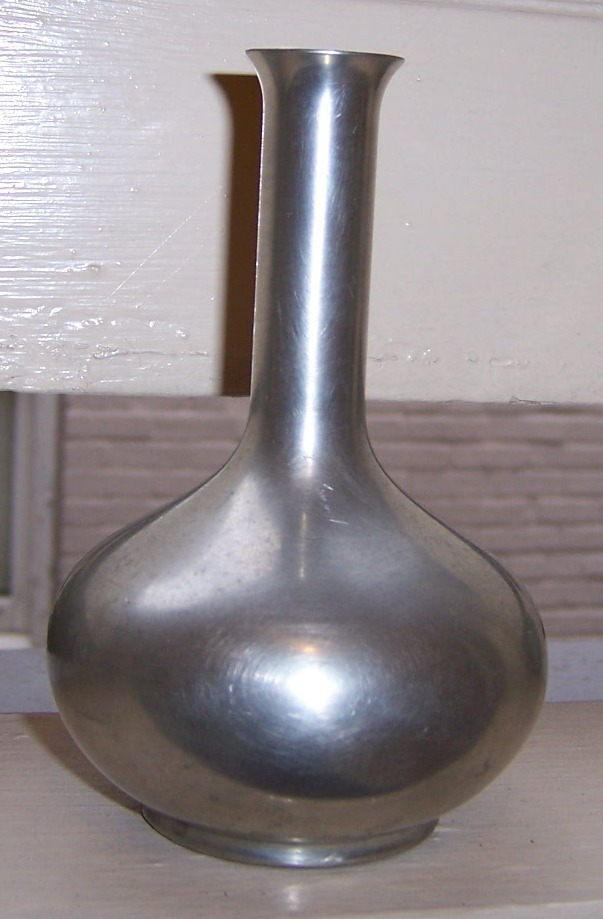
Pewter vase

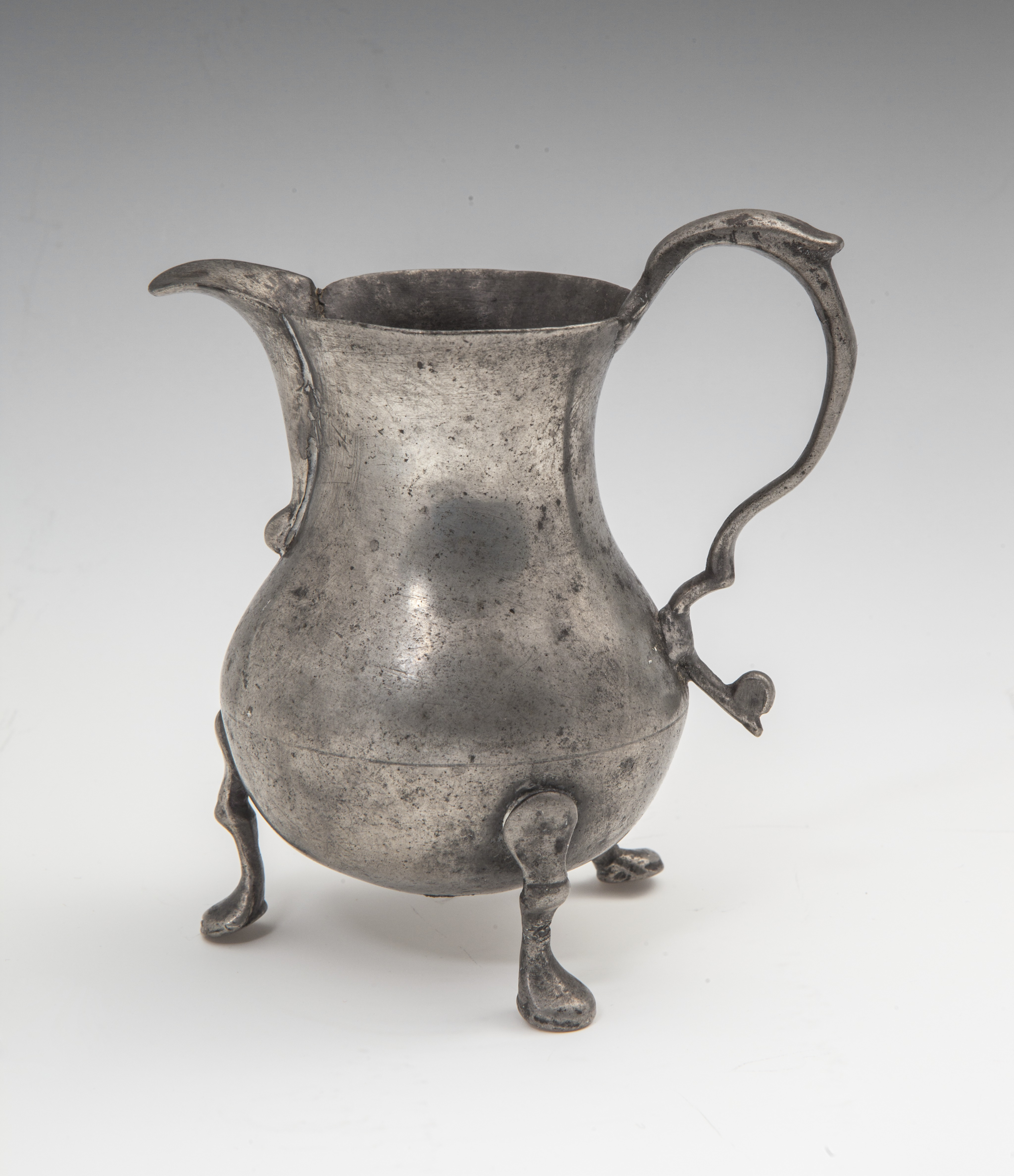
Pewter cream pitcher c. 1780

== Types ==
In antiquity, pewter was tin alloyed with lead and sometimes also copper. Older pewters with higher lead content are heavier, tarnish faster, and their oxidation has a darker, silver-gray color. Pewters containing lead are no longer used in items that will come in contact with food or the human body (such as cups, plates, or jewelry), due to the toxicity of lead. Modern pewters are available that are completely free of lead, although many pewters containing lead are still being produced for other purposes.

A typical European casting alloy contains 94% tin, 1% copper and 5% antimony. A European pewter sheet would contain 92% tin, 2% copper, and 6% antimony. Asian pewter, produced mostly in Malaysia, Singapore, and Thailand, contains a higher percentage of tin, usually 97.5% tin, 1% copper, and 1.5% antimony. This makes the alloy slightly softer.

The term Mexican pewter is used for any of various alloys of aluminium that are used for decorative items.

Pewter is also used to imitate platinum in costume jewelry.

Modern lead-free pewter casting alloys are typically high-tin compositions formulated to give good fluidity and a bright polished finish, and are manufactured in accordance with standards such as BS EN 611-1:1996 for pewter and pewterware.

== Properties ==
Pewter, being a softer material, can be manipulated in various ways such as being cast, hammered, turned, spun and engraved.

Given that pewter is soft at room temperature, a pewter bell does not ring clearly. Cooling it in liquid nitrogen hardens it and enables it to ring, but also makes it more brittle.

== See also ==
- Britannia metal
- English pewter
- Royal Selangor (one of the largest manufacturers of pewter products)
- Solder
- Spin casting
