= English pewter =

Metal alloy, primarily of tin

While the term pewter covers a range of tin-based alloys, the term English pewter has come to represent a strictly-controlled alloy, specified by BSEN611-1 and British Standard 5140, consisting mainly of tin (ideally 92%), with the balance made up of antimony and copper. Significantly, it is free of lead and nickel. Although the exact percentages vary between manufacturers, a typical standard for present-day pewter is approximately 91% tin, 7.5% antimony and 1.5% copper.

== History ==
By the 15th century, the Worshipful Company of Pewterers controlled pewter constituents in England. This company originally had two grades of pewter, but in the 16th century a third grade was added. The first type, known as "fine metal", was used for tableware. It consisted of tin with as much copper as it could absorb, which is about 1%. The second type, known as "trifling metal" or "trifle", was used for holloware. It is made up of fine metal with approximately 4% lead. The last type of pewter, known as "lay" or "ley" metal, was used for items that were not in contact with food or drink. It consisted of tin with 15% lead. These three alloys were used, with little variation, until the 20th century.

Lead was removed from the composition in 1974, by BS5140, reinforced by the European directive BSEN611 in 1994.

Until the end of the 18th century, the only method of manufacture was by casting and the soldering of components. From the last quarter of the 18th century, improvement in alloys (e.g. britannia metal) and techniques allowed objects to be made from pewter by stamping and spinning.
