= Abberley (disambiguation) =

Abberley is a village and civil parish in Worcestershire, England.

Abberley may also refer to:

== People ==
- Neal Abberley (1944–2011), an English cricketer
- Paul Abberley (born 1959), chief executive of Charles Stanley Group

== Other uses ==
- Abberley Clock Tower, a clock tower in Abberley, Worcestershire
- Abberley Hall School, a boarding school in Abberley, Worcestershire, England
- Abberley Hall, a country house in Worcestershire, England
