= Grade II* listed buildings in Malvern Hills (district) =

Worcestershire shown within England

There are over 20,000 Grade II* listed buildings in England. This page is a list of these buildings in the Malvern Hills district in Worcestershire.

== Malvern Hills ==
Name	Location	Type	Completed (Note: The date given is the date used by Historic England as significant for the initial building or that of an important part in the structure's description.)	Date designated	Grid ref. (Note: The grid reference is based on the British national grid reference system, sometimes known as OSGB36, used by the Ordnance Survey.) Geo-coordinates	Entry number (Note: The "List Entry Number" is a unique number assigned to each listed building and scheduled monument by Historic England.)	Image
Abberley Hall (that Part in Abberley)	Abberley Park, Abberley, Malvern Hills	House	Early 18th century	18 June 1976	SO7449666437; 52°17′44″N 2°22′31″W	1155526	Abberley Hall (that Part in Abberley) More images
Church of St Michael	Abberley, Malvern Hills	Parish Church	12th century	29 July 1959	SO7535067869; 52°18′30″N 2°21′47″W	1082704	Church of St Michael More images
Clock Tower, to North of Abberley Hall	Abberley Park, Abberley, Malvern Hills	Clock Tower	1883-84	18 June 1976	SO7447166652; 52°17′51″N 2°22′33″W	1082707	Clock Tower, to North of Abberley Hall More images
Church of St Mary Magdalene	Alfrick, Malvern Hills	Parish Church	Late 12th century	29 July 1959	SO7484552974; 52°10′28″N 2°22′09″W	1082221	Church of St Mary Magdalene More images
Pool House	Astley, Astley and Dunley, Malvern Hills	House	17th century	12 November 1951	SO7959168393; 52°18′48″N 2°18′03″W	1082684	Pool House More images
Yarhampton House	Yarhampton, Astley and Dunley, Malvern Hills	Farmhouse	1610	12 November 1951	SO7761767392; 52°18′15″N 2°19′47″W	1082688	Yarhampton House More images
Church of St Bartholomew	Bayton, Malvern Hills	Parish Church	12th century	18 April 1966	SO6912373223; 52°21′22″N 2°27′17″W	1081471	Church of St Bartholomew More images
Shakenhurst	Bayton, Malvern Hills	Country House	17th century	18 April 1966	SO6728272970; 52°21′14″N 2°28′54″W	1081469	Shakenhurst More images
Church of St Faith	Berrow, Malvern Hills	Church	12th century	23 March 1968	SO7938134278; 52°00′24″N 2°18′06″W	1098847	Church of St Faith More images
Church of St Peter and St Paul	Birtsmorton, Malvern Hills	Church	14th century	25 March 1968	SO8011535504; 52°01′03″N 2°17′28″W	1302867	Church of St Peter and St Paul More images
Church of St Michael	Bockleton, Malvern Hills	Parish Church	12th century	18 April 1966	SO5930261428; 52°14′58″N 2°35′51″W	1082473	Church of St Michael More images
Church of St John the Baptist	Bransford, Malvern Hills	Church	13th century	29 July 1959	SO7970351559; 52°09′43″N 2°17′53″W	1098793	Church of St John the Baptist More images
Butts Farmhouse	Butts Bank, Broadwas, Malvern Hills	Farmhouse	15th century	12 November 1951	SO7624755235; 52°11′41″N 2°20′56″W	1349343	Upload Photo
Church of St Mary Magdalene	Broadwas, Malvern Hills	Parish Church	Late 12th century	29 July 1959	SO7549655126; 52°11′38″N 2°21′36″W	1349345	Church of St Mary Magdalene More images
Stone Farmhouse and Attached Hop Kiln	Broadwas, Malvern Hills	Farmhouse	15th century	12 November 1951	SO7557155331; 52°11′44″N 2°21′32″W	1082977	Upload Photo
Mythe Bridge (that Part in Civil Parish of Bushley)	Bushley, Malvern Hills	Road Bridge	1825	11 August 1952	SO8885833736; 52°00′07″N 2°09′49″W	1282810	Mythe Bridge (that Part in Civil Parish of Bushley) More images
Paynes Place	Bushley, Malvern Hills	House	16th century	11 August 1952	SO8734334023; 52°00′16″N 2°11′09″W	1082219	Paynes Place More images
Pull Court, Screen, Archway and Gates	Bushley, Malvern Hills	Country House	1834-39	25 March 1968	SO8621736086; 52°01′23″N 2°12′08″W	1082217	Pull Court, Screen, Archway and Gates More images
Bannut Tree House	Castlemorton, Malvern Hills	House	1890	23 February 1987	SO7854237643; 52°02′12″N 2°18′51″W	1156932	Bannut Tree House More images
Church of St Kenelm	Clifton-upon-Teme, Malvern Hills	Parish Church	13th century	29 July 1959	SO7149361611; 52°15′07″N 2°25′08″W	1083009	Church of St Kenelm More images
Woodmanton Farmhouse, Kitchen, Outbuildings and Tower Base	Clifton upon Teme, Malvern Hills	Farmhouse	About 1827	12 November 1951	SO7189660476; 52°14′30″N 2°24′47″W	1302591	Upload Photo
Church of St Leonard	Cotheridge, Malvern Hills	Parish Church	Early 12th century	29 July 1959	SO7867054739; 52°11′26″N 2°18′48″W	1179067	Church of St Leonard More images
Cotheridge Court	Cotheridge, Malvern Hills	Country House	Late C16	12 November 1951	SO7846854630; 52°11′22″N 2°18′59″W	1082941	Upload Photo
Church of St Nicholas	Earls Croome, Malvern Hills	Church	Norman	25 March 1968	SO8703542025; 52°04′35″N 2°11′26″W	1302545	Church of St Nicholas More images
Dunstall Castle	Dunstall Common, Earls Croome, Malvern Hills	Castle	1750-60	25 March 1968	SO8856242898; 52°05′04″N 2°10′06″W	1082583	Dunstall Castle More images
Lower House Farmhouse	Eastham, Malvern Hills	Farmhouse	c. 1750	6 October 1952	SO6762668098; 52°18′36″N 2°28′35″W	1081442	Lower House Farmhouse More images
Puddleford Farmhouse and adjoining Cider House and Hop Kilns	Eastham, Malvern Hills	Farmhouse	c. 1600	6 October 1952	SO6843767992; 52°18′33″N 2°27′52″W	1350031	Upload Photo
Robin's End	Eastham, Malvern Hills	House	c. 1735	18 April 1966	SO6604368165; 52°18′38″N 2°29′58″W	1081444	Robin's End
Church of St John Baptist	Eldersfield, Malvern Hills	Church	12th century	25 March 1968	SO7998831172; 51°58′43″N 2°17′34″W	1349234	Church of St John Baptist More images
Hardwick Farmhouse	Eldersfield, Malvern Hills	Farmhouse	Late 14th century	28 March 1988	SO8171732730; 51°59′34″N 2°16′04″W	1078234	Upload Photo
The Red House	Eldersfield, Malvern Hills	House	Mid 17th century	5 December 1974	SO7933230056; 51°58′07″N 2°18′08″W	1098841	Upload Photo
Curved Linking Wing, Pavilion and Orangery and including Five-arched Arcade to rear of Link - South-west of Witley Court	Witley Park, Great Witley, Malvern Hills	Orangery	c. 1860	27 November 1984	SO7692364918; 52°16′55″N 2°20′23″W	1349485	Curved Linking Wing, Pavilion and Orangery and including Five-arched Arcade to rear of Link - South-west of Witley Court
Home Farm House	Woodbury Hill, Great Witley, Malvern Hills	Farmhouse	c. 1500	27 November 1984	SO7519665234; 52°17′05″N 2°21′54″W	1302892	Upload Photo
Triton Fountain c.80m east of East Front of Witley Court	Witley Park, Great Witley, Malvern Hills	Statue	c. 1860	12 November 1951	SO7709664905; 52°16′55″N 2°20′14″W	1082660	Triton Fountain c.80m east of East Front of Witley Court More images
Church of St Bartholomew	Grimley, Malvern Hills	Parish Church	12th century	29 July 1959	SO8363060682; 52°14′39″N 2°14′28″W	1349352	Church of St Bartholomew More images
Old Hill Farmhouse	Grimley, Malvern Hills	Farmhouse	Late 16th century	15 October 1984	SO8156461545; 52°15′06″N 2°16′17″W	1082945	Upload Photo
Thorngrove	Grimley, Malvern Hills	Country House	Late 18th century	29 July 1959	SO8220960095; 52°14′20″N 2°15′43″W	1179144	Thorngrove More images
Church of St Philip and St James	Hallow, Malvern Hills	Parish Church	1867-9	15 October 1984	SO8285157927; 52°13′09″N 2°15′09″W	1349353	Church of St Philip and St James More images
Church of All Saints	Hanley William, Hanley, Malvern Hills	Parish Church	12th century	18 April 1966	SO6730965976; 52°17′27″N 2°28′51″W	1296918	Church of All Saints More images
Church of St Mary	Hanley Castle, Malvern Hills	Church	Early 14th century	25 March 1968	SO8388341944; 52°04′32″N 2°14′12″W	1349232	Church of St Mary More images
Severn End	Hanley Castle, Malvern Hills	Country House	16th century	11 August 1952	SO8455742643; 52°04′55″N 2°13′36″W	1098805	Severn End More images
Our Lady and St Alphonsus Catholic Church	Hanley Swan, Malvern Hills	Church	1846	25 March 1968	SO812436; 52°05′27″N 2°16′31″W	1098781	Our Lady and St Alphonsus Catholic Church More images
Baughton Court	Baughton, Hill Croome, Malvern Hills	Timber Framed House	15th century to 17th century	11 August 1952	SO8780341936; 52°04′32″N 2°10′46″W	1157153	Baughton Court More images
Church of St Mary	Hill Croome, Hill Croome, Malvern Hills	Church	13th century	25 March 1968	SO8879240422; 52°03′43″N 2°09′54″W	1082590	Church of St Mary More images
Glebe Farmhouse	Hill Croome, Malvern Hills	Farmhouse	14th century to 17th century	11 August 1952	SO8872340381; 52°03′42″N 2°09′57″W	1099073	Glebe Farmhouse More images
Hillhampton House	Hillhampton, Malvern Hills	House	17th century	12 November 1951	SO7747665422; 52°17′11″N 2°19′54″W	1082666	Upload Photo
Great House and attached Outbuilding adjoining to Rear	Bickley, Knighton on Teme, Malvern Hills	Farmhouse	c. 1600	6 October 1952	SO6418971278; 52°20′18″N 2°31′37″W	1350059	Upload Photo
Manor House	Knightwick, Malvern Hills	Farmhouse	Early 18th century	12 November 1951	SO7216855061; 52°11′35″N 2°24′31″W	1156867	Manor House More images
Church of St Mary	Kyre Park, Kyre, Malvern Hills	Parish Church	12th century	18 April 1966	SO6264663515; 52°16′07″N 2°32′56″W	1179365	Church of St Mary More images
Dovecote about 120m north-east of Kyre Park	Kyre, Malvern Hills	Dovecote	c1600 or earlier	18 April 1966	SO6273763572; 52°16′09″N 2°32′51″W	1179454	Dovecote about 120m north-east of Kyre Park More images
Little Malvern Court	Little Malvern, Malvern Hills	House	Mid 16th century	11 August 1952	SO7699140368; 52°03′40″N 2°20′13″W	1178481	Little Malvern Court More images
Church of Saint Mary	Longdon Village, Longdon, Malvern Hills	Church	c. 1300	25 March 1968	SO8382536256; 52°01′28″N 2°14′14″W	1238836	Church of Saint Mary More images
Longdon Hall	Longdon, Malvern Hills	Jettied House	16th century	11 August 1952	SO8411134976; 52°00′47″N 2°13′59″W	1238531	Upload Photo
The Moat House	Longdon Village, Longdon, Malvern Hills	Moat	16th century	25 March 1968	SO8391236121; 52°01′24″N 2°14′09″W	1238754	Upload Photo
Old Church of St Bartholomew	Lower Sapey, Malvern Hills	Church	Early 12th century	29 July 1959	SO6993060207; 52°14′21″N 2°26′30″W	1098648	Old Church of St Bartholomew More images
Lulsley Court	Lulsley, Malvern Hills	Farmhouse	16th century	12 November 1951	SO7444155982; 52°12′05″N 2°22′31″W	1156981	Lulsley Court More images
Abbey Gateway	Malvern, Malvern Hills	Abbey	15th century	30 November 1949	SO7753145849; 52°06′38″N 2°19′46″W	1349407	Abbey Gateway More images
Chapel and Cloister at the Convent of the Holy Name	Malvern, Malvern Hills	Chapel	1891-1893	4 June 1973	SO7913448052; 52°07′49″N 2°18′22″W	1082736	Chapel and Cloister at the Convent of the Holy Name
Main Building of Malvern College	Malvern, Malvern Hills	School	1862	1 January 1970	SO7775745143; 52°06′15″N 2°19′34″W	1082796	Main Building of Malvern College More images
Laughern House School	Martley, Malvern Hills	Country House	Late 18th century	12 November 1951	SO7661459593; 52°14′03″N 2°20′38″W	1178570	Laughern House School More images
Warden's Lodge, Boardroom, Chapel, Library and attached Buildings to East of Courtyard at Beauchamp Almshouses	Newland, Malvern Hills	House	1863	9 February 1988	SO7960648460; 52°08′03″N 2°17′58″W	1349271	Upload Photo
Church of Saint Nicholas	Queenhill, Queenhill, Malvern Hills	Church	11th century	25 March 1968	SO8607336647; 52°01′41″N 2°12′16″W	1239009	Church of Saint Nicholas More images
Church of St Michael	Rochford, Malvern Hills	Parish Church	12th century	18 April 1966	SO6291868506; 52°18′48″N 2°32′43″W	1082446	Church of St Michael More images
Church of St Denys	Severn Stoke, Malvern Hills	Anglican Church	1872	25 March 1968	SO8560043991; 52°05′39″N 2°12′42″W	1178488	Church of St Denys More images
The Owl House (Owl's Nest) at South End of Lake	Croome Park, Severn Stoke, Malvern Hills	Garden Temple	c. 1766	25 March 1968	SO8895043646; 52°05′28″N 2°09′46″W	1178399	The Owl House (Owl's Nest) at South End of Lake More images
Church of All Saints	Shelsey Beauchamp, Shelsley Beauchamp, Malvern Hills	Parish Church	14th century	27 November 1984	SO7310962856; 52°15′48″N 2°23′44″W	1349514	Church of All Saints More images
Remains of Churchyard Cross	Shelsey Beauchamp, Shelsley Beauchamp, Malvern Hills	Cross	15th century	29 July 1959	SO7312062844; 52°15′47″N 2°23′43″W	1082633	Upload Photo
Base of Churchyard Cross about 5m south of Church of St Mary	Shrawley, Shrawley, Malvern Hills	Cross	14th century	29 July 1959	SO8060964782; 52°16′51″N 2°17′08″W	1302738	Upload Photo
Church of St Mary	Stanford on Teme, Stanford with Orleton, Malvern Hills	Parish Church	1768-9	18 April 1966	SO7024065728; 52°17′20″N 2°26′16″W	1173236	Church of St Mary More images
Church of St Andrew	Stockton on Teme, Stockton on Teme, Malvern Hills	Parish Church	Mid 12th century	18 April 1966	SO7161467339; 52°18′12″N 2°25′04″W	1082110	Church of St Andrew More images
Stables and adjoining Shelter Shed about 20m north-east of the Hyde	Stoke Bliss, Malvern Hills	Stables	19th century	6 October 1952	SO6286961941; 52°15′16″N 2°32′43″W	1082454	Upload Photo
Stoke Bliss Church	Stoke Bliss, Stoke Bliss, Malvern Hills	Parish Church	12th century	18 April 1966	SO6514262850; 52°15′46″N 2°30′44″W	1179715	Stoke Bliss Church More images
The Hyde and adjoining Hop Kiln	Stoke Bliss, Malvern Hills	Farmhouse	14th century	6 October 1952	SO6285461928; 52°15′15″N 2°32′44″W	1082453	Upload Photo
Lower Tundridge Farmhouse	Suckley, Malvern Hills	Farmhouse	c. 1650	29 July 1959	SO7357151144; 52°09′29″N 2°23′16″W	1082207	Upload Photo
Church of St Mary	Tenbury Wells, Malvern Hills	Church	Anglo-Saxon	18 April 1966	SO5944268368; 52°18′43″N 2°35′47″W	1082426	Church of St Mary More images
Church of St Michael and All Angels	St Michaels, Tenbury, Malvern Hills	Anglican Church	1856-1858	24 October 1988	SO5826865753; 52°17′18″N 2°36′48″W	1349604	Church of St Michael and All Angels More images
Cornwall House	Tenbury, Malvern Hills	House	Late 17th century	6 October 1952	SO5945768041; 52°18′32″N 2°35′46″W	1179894	Cornwall House More images
Nos 5 and 6, Market Square and adjoining Railings to Front	Tenbury, Malvern Hills	House	Early 18th century	6 October 1952	SO5947868221; 52°18′38″N 2°35′45″W	1180022	Upload Photo
Pump Room, Brine Baths and Reading Room	Tenbury, Malvern Hills	Spring	c. 1862	7 March 1972	SO5968768288; 52°18′40″N 2°35′34″W	1082404	Pump Room, Brine Baths and Reading Room More images
St Michael's College and adjoining Cloister	St Michaels, Tenbury, Malvern Hills	Theological College	1856-8	24 October 1988	SO5829265714; 52°17′17″N 2°36′46″W	1349605	St Michael's College and adjoining Cloister More images
Parish Church of Saint Peter and Saint Paul	Upton-upon-Severn, Malvern Hills	Parish Church	1831	25 March 1968	SO8515140277; 52°03′38″N 2°13′05″W	1227107	Parish Church of Saint Peter and Saint Paul More images
Tower of Former Parish Church	Upton-upon-Severn, Malvern Hills	Bell Tower	14th century	25 March 1968	SO8515340695; 52°03′52″N 2°13′05″W	1226692	Tower of Former Parish Church More images
2–6 Church Street	Upton-upon-Severn, Malvern Hills	House	Late 16th century	25 March 1968	SO8512440684; 52°03′52″N 2°13′06″W	1082244	Upload Photo
Church of St Lawrence	Wichenford, Malvern Hills	Parish Church	12th century	29 July 1959	SO7871960147; 52°14′21″N 2°18′47″W	1082931	Church of St Lawrence More images
Dovecote at Wichenford Court	Wichenford, Malvern Hills	Dovecote	17th century	15 October 1984	SO7871859872; 52°14′12″N 2°18′47″W	1301822	Dovecote at Wichenford Court More images
Wichenford Court	Wichenford, Malvern Hills	House	15th century	12 November 1951	SO7879059835; 52°14′11″N 2°18′43″W	1082896	Upload Photo
Council House	Malvern	House	1880	11 May 1979	SO7785245896; 52°06′39″N 2°19′29″W	1156369	Council House More images
