= Areley Hall =

- Interactive map of the Areley Hall area

General information
- Type: Country house
- Location: Stourport-on-Severn, Worcestershire, Stourport-on-Severn, Worcestershire DY13 0TA, England
- Coordinates: 52.3376°N 2.2882°W
- Construction started: 16th century
- Renovated: 1820s, 1870s

Listed Building – Grade II
- Designated: 5 July 1950
- Reference no.: 1209442

Areley Hall is a Grade II listed country house near Areley Kings in Stourport-on-Severn, Worcestershire, England. It is not to be confused with nearby Astley Hall, the former home of Prime Minister Stanley Baldwin. In the area there are several large manor and country houses, among which Witley Court, Astley Hall, Pool House, Areley Hall, Hartlebury and Abberley Hall (with its clock tower) are particularly significant.

Areley Hall mainly dates from the late 16th century, though extensive alterations were carried out in the 1820s and 1870s. It is largely timber-framed with some brick additions. Inside, the staircase and the roof structure suggest that substantial parts of the original structure survive, though fireplaces and other internal detail relate to the 19th century improvements. Areley Hall was Grade II listed in 1950.
