= Areley Kings =

Village in Worcestershire, England

Coordinates: 52.33132°N 2.29345°W

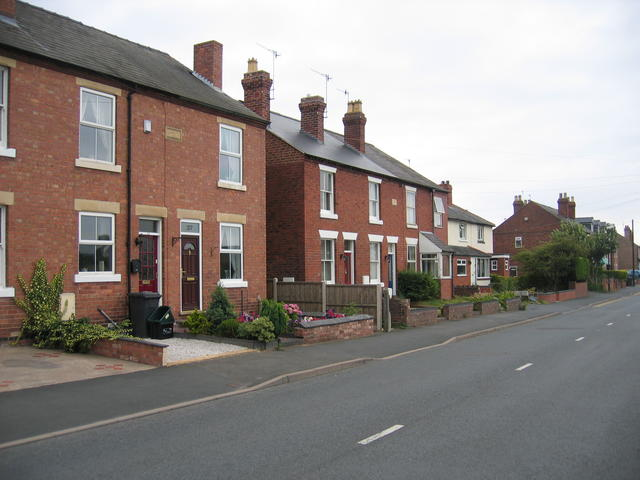

- Location within Worcestershire
- Population: 8,258 (Ward, 2021)
- OS grid reference: SO801704
  - London: 109 miles (175 km)
- Civil parish: Stourport-on-Severn
- District: Wyre Forest
- Shire county: Worcestershire
- Region: West Midlands
- Country: England
- Sovereign state: United Kingdom
- Post town: STOURPORT-ON-SEVERN
- Postcode district: DY13
- Dialling code: 01299
- Police: West Mercia
- Fire: Hereford and Worcester
- Ambulance: West Midlands
- UK Parliament: West Worcestershire

Areley Kings is a village on the River Severn, in the civil parish of Stourport-on-Severn, in the Wyre Forest of Worcestershire, England. It is 10 miles north of Worcester and south of Stourport on Severn. It is in the Wyre Forest. The village is featured in the Domesday Book of 1086, and is home to many historical places of interest such as Areley Hall and St Bartholomew's Church. The Areley Kings & Riverside ward had a population of 8,258 in 2021.

== History ==
The name Areley derives from the Old English earnlēah meaning 'eagle wood/clearing'. The affix Kings stems from the fact that the village was previously part of a Royal manor.

The manor of Areley Kings was from early times part of the manor of Martley and the rector of Martley still has the right to appoint the rector at Areley Kings. The manor of Areley originated in a fishery at "Ernel" which, with the land belonging to it, was granted by the Empress Matilda to Bordesley Abbey upon its foundation in 1136, and retained until the Dissolution.

Prince Rupert of the Rhine is rumoured to have slept a night at Areley House during the English Civil War.

Areley Kings was in the upper division of Doddingtree Hundred.

In 1931 the parish had a population of 940. On 1 April 1933 the parish was abolished and merged with Stourport on Severn and Astley.

== Church ==
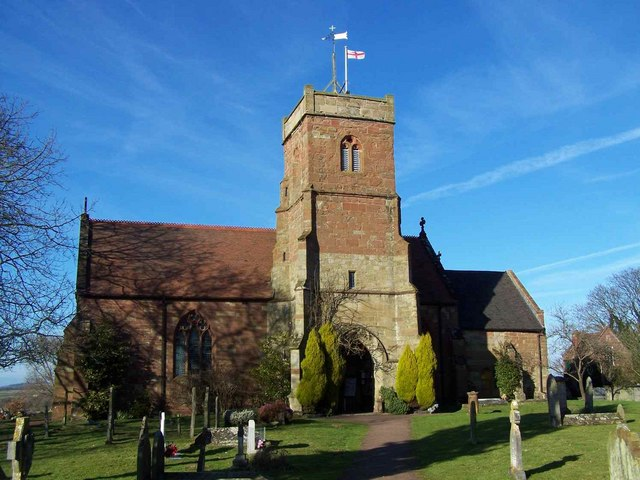
St Bartholomew's Church

St Bartholomew's Parish Church at Areley Kings was founded as a Norman Church, with a continuous history and a partial re-building by the Victorians. The church is probably first mentioned in the preface of the Brut of Laȝamon, who wrote sometime between 1189 and 1207. He describes himself as a priest at Erneleye, at a noble church upon Severn's bank. He wrote a history of England, partly legendary, partly factual, translating earlier writings from Latin and French. The discovery, during rebuilding, of the base of a Norman font under the nave floor with an inscription containing the name of Layamon, establishes the connection with the writer and shows that a church existed here c. 1200.

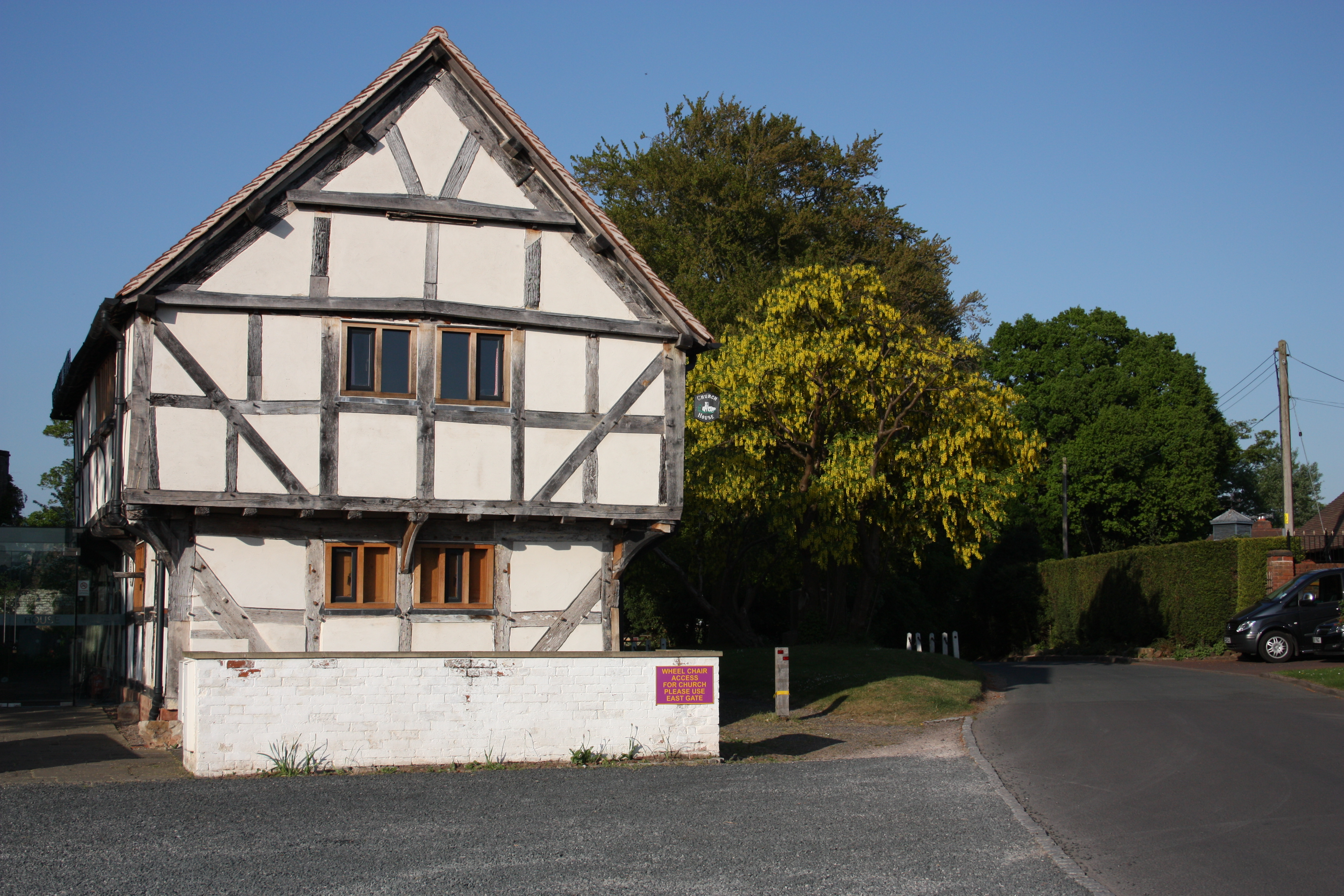
The Church House

The church complex includes a Queen Anne Rectory and medieval timber-framed church house. In the churchyard is the tomb of Sir Harry Coningsby of Hampton Court Castle.

== Notable people ==
- Charles Harrison, MP for Bewdley from 1874 to 1890 lived at Areley Court, Areley Kings.
- Frances Ridley Havergal wrote the hymn Take my life and let it be at Areley House in 1874.
- Layamon 12/13th century poet lived in Areley Kings and a local road is named after him.
