= James Lamb =

James Lamb is the name of:

- James Lamb (orientalist) (1599–1664), English clergyman and orientalist
- Sir James Lamb, 1st Baronet (1752–1824), British author, barrister and Member of Parliament
- James Lamb (cabinetmaker) (1816–1903), British cabinetmaker and furniture designer
- James Lamb (footballer) (1893-1945), English footballer, see List of AFC Bournemouth players (25–99 appearances)
