= The Elms, Abberley =

Hotel in Abberley, England

Coordinates: 52.3026°N 2.3934°W

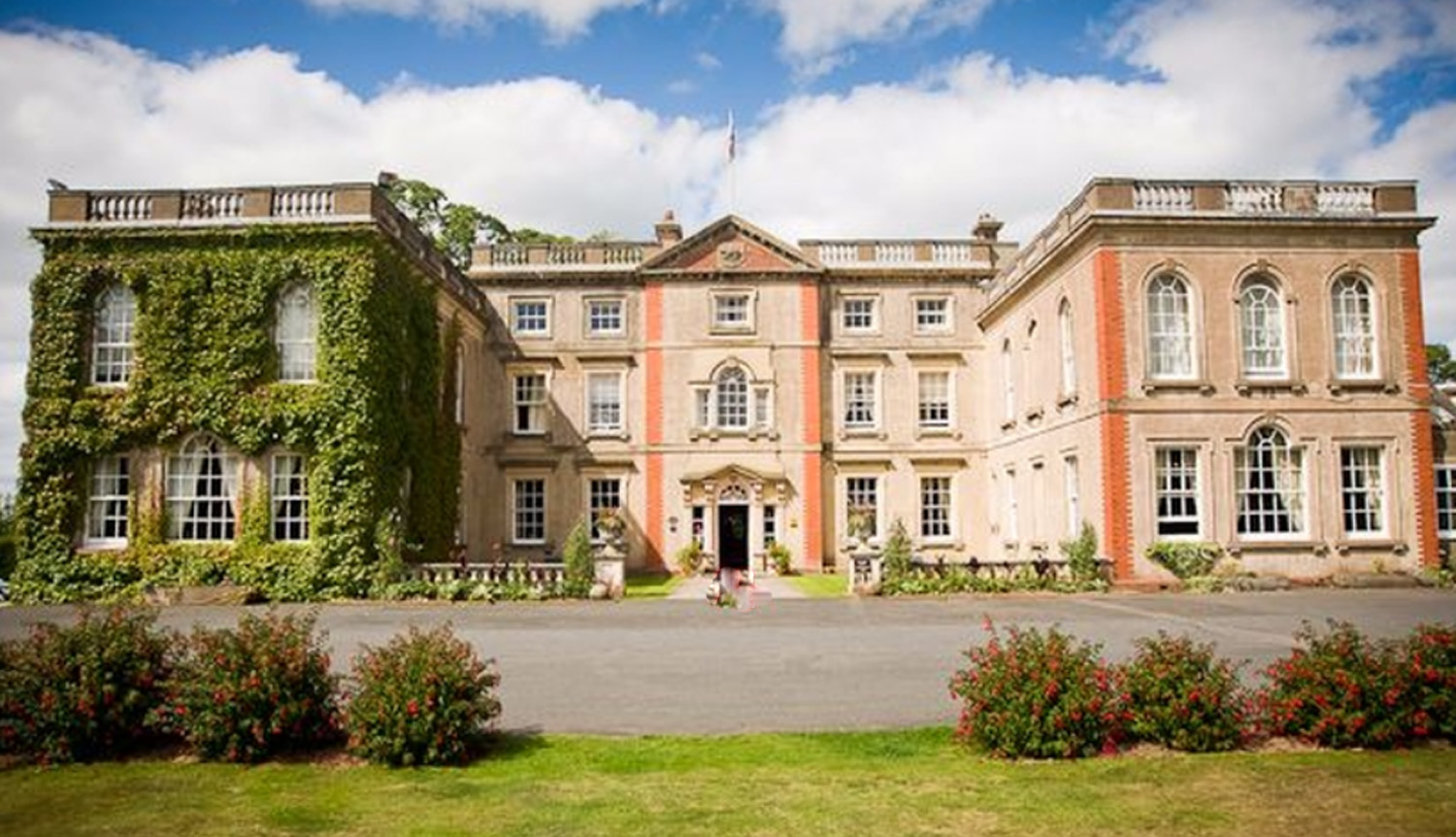
The Elms, Abberley

The Elms Hotel in Abberley, Worcestershire is a building of historical significance and is Grade II listed on the English Heritage Register. It was built in 1710 by the architect Thomas White (1674-1748) of Worcester who was a pupil of Sir Christopher Wren. It was the home of several notable families over the next two centuries and is now a hotel.

== The Bury family ==
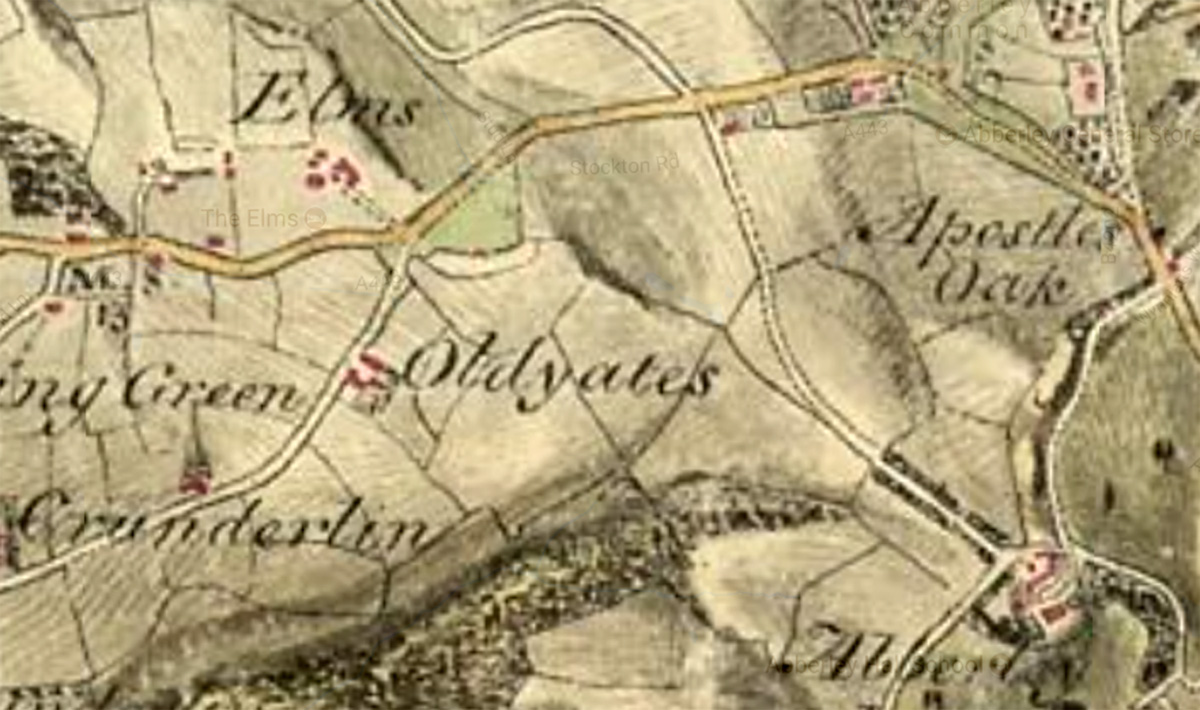
Map of The Elms, Abberley in 1813

The Elms was the home of the Bury family, who were wealthy landowners, for almost the whole of the 1700s. It is likely that they bought the Estate soon after 1708 when William Walshe of Abberley Hall died. and then in 1710 built the house. Successive generations lived there until Thomas Bury (1729-1778) and his wife Cecilia (1732-1799) became the last in their line.

Thomas Bury (1729-1778) was born in Abberley in 1729. His parents were Thomas and Anne Bury whose memorials can be seen in St Michael's Church in Abberley. In 1768 he became Sheriff of Worcestershire. In the following year of 1769 he married Cecilia Maria Newport who was the daughter of the wealthy aristocratic landed proprietor John Newport of Hanley Court. The couple had no children and when Thomas died in 1778 he left all of his property including “The Elms” to Cecilia. When she died in 1799 she left all of her Estate to her nephew Colonel James Wakeman Newport. In gratitude he erected a memorial in her honour at the Church in Hanley William which reads.

"To the memory of Mrs Cecilia Maria Bury, youngest daughter of John Newport Esq of Hanley. This faint tho’ affectionate memorial of the acknowledged virtues of a most lamented aunt is erected as a duteous and grateful tribute by her nephew Colonel Newport. She died March 19th 1799 in her 67th year and her remains were deposited with those of her husband Thomas Bury Esq in their family vault at Abberley."

Colonel Newport did not live at the Elms but for many years he rented it to various tenants. In about 1828 it was bought by Admiral Thomas James Maling.

== Admiral Thomas James Maling ==
Admiral Thomas James Maling (1778-1849) was born in 1778. His father was Christopher Thomas Maling of Hendon Lodge, County Durham. He joined the Navy in 1791 and rose rapidly through the ranks becoming a Commander by 1798. He fought in many notable battles throughout his career. He married twice – his first wife Harriet Darwin died in Chile in 1825. Then in 1828 he married Jemima Bromley who was the daughter of Colonel Henry Bromley who at that time owned Abberley Hall. At the time of his marriage he bought “The Elms” and he and Jemima lived there with their four children for many years. The 1841 Census shows that they were living on the Elms estate with their family and eleven servants.

In 1836 Jemima's father Henry died and Abberley Hall was bought by John Lewis Moilliet who came from Geneva in about 1844. The Maling family continued to live at “The Elms” until 1849 when Admiral Maling died. It was then bought by James Moilliet, the son of the proprietor of Abberley Hall.

== The Moilliet family ==
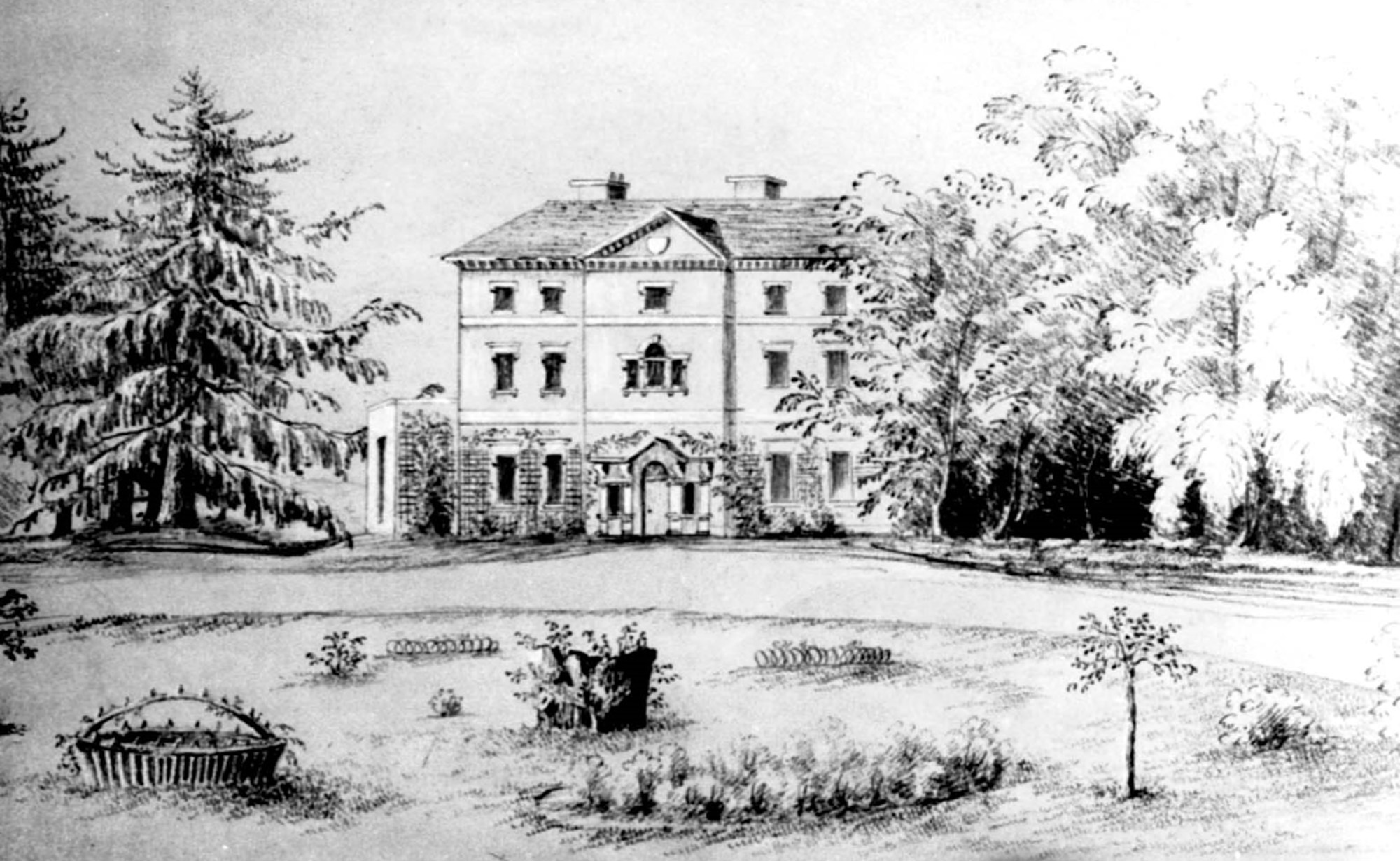
Sketch of The Elms in 1850 by James Moilliet

James Moilliet (1807-1878) was born in 1807 in Staffordshire. His father John Lewis Moilliet founded the bank J. L. Moilliet and Sons which later merged with Lloyds Banking Group. He joined his father's banking firm and worked there until he gained his inheritance. He married twice. His first wife Lucy Harriot Galton by whom he had six children died in 1848 a year before he bought “The Elms”. He married Jeanne Susanne Sayous (1832-1901) who was Swiss in 1853 and had four more children. While he was living at the Elms he provided in 1850 the funding for the new St Mary's Church and his eldest daughter Miss Lucy Amelia Moilliet was asked to lay the foundation stone. He made a sketch of “The Elms” in about 1850 which is shown.

When James's mother died in 1857 he moved to Abberley Hall with his family and the Elms was let to the Pearson family.

== The Pearson family ==
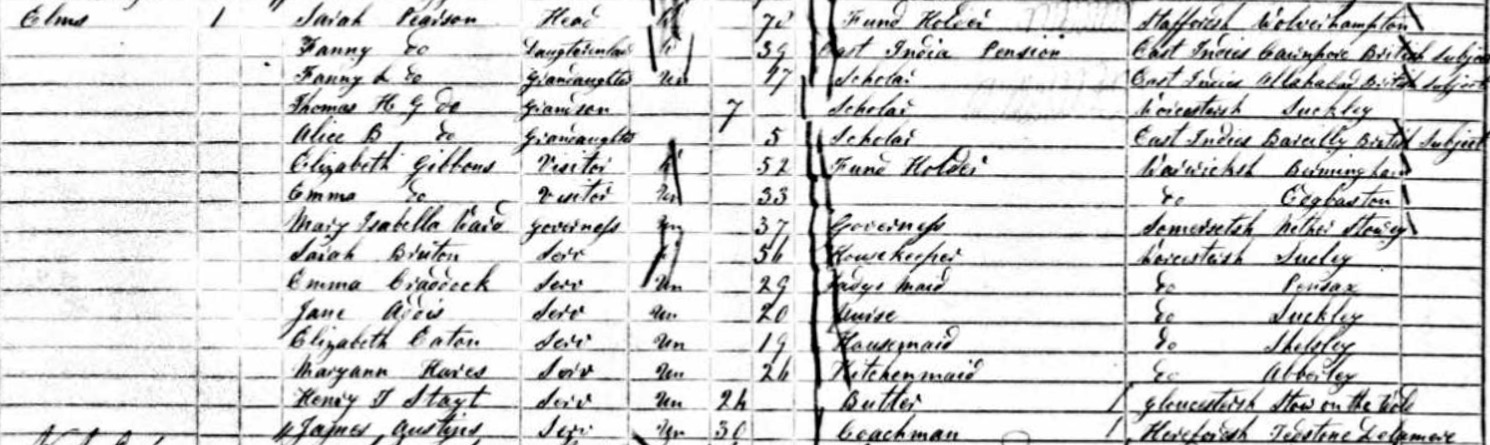
The 1861 Census record of Sarah and Fanny Pearson at The Elms

Sarah Pearson (1782-1873) was the widow of Reverend Thomas Pearson who had died in 1857 at the Rectory in Great Witley. She rented the Elms with her daughter-in-law Fanny Pearson for many years. Sarah was born Sarah Gibbons and was the third daughter of Thomas Gibbons of the Oaks in Wolverhampton. He was part of the wealthy Gibbons family who owned numerous iron foundries. In 1799 she married Thomas Pearson (1774-1857) whose father owned Tettenhall Towers in Wolverhampton. He subsequently became a clergyman and for many years was the Rector of Great Witley. They had several children one of whom was Henry Edward Pearson who married Fanny Williamson. Henry died in the Indian Mutiny in 1857 so the two widows Sarah and Fanny took out a lease on the Elms. The 1861 Census shows them living at the Elms together with three of Fanny's children, a governess and seven servants.

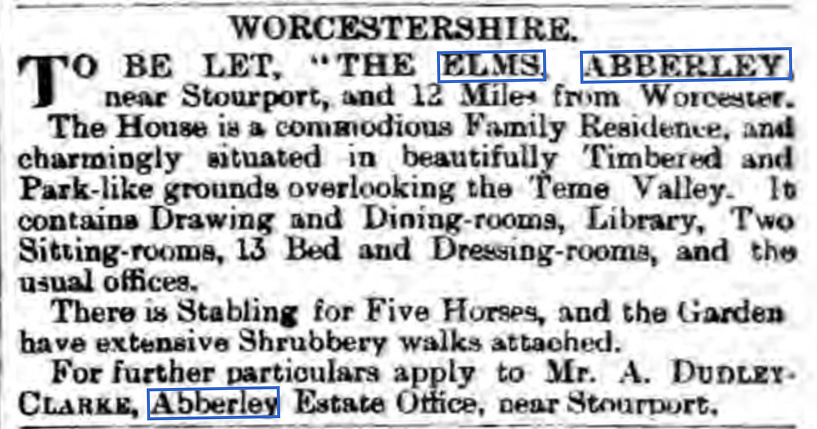
Rental notice for the Elms in 1892.

In 1867 Abberley Hall and The Elms were sold by the Moilliet family to Joseph Jones and it remained in this family for many years. Sarah and Fanny continued to rent The Elms while the Jones family were the landlords.

Sarah died in 1873 at the age of 91 and was buried at Great Witley with her husband. Fanny continued to live at the Elms with her children until 1890 when her daughter Fanny Louisa died. There is a memorial window in the church in her honour.

Sarah's great grandson Hesketh Pearson who was a British actor wrote his autobiography and in it he mentions his ancestor's residence at the Elms. He said that his father Thomas Henry Gibbons Pearson often visited the Elms and told him that:

"The view from the terrace at the back was the loveliest in the world. Certainly there can be few lovelier, for the River Teme stretches away between trees, lush meadows and low hills to the distant heights above Ludlow."

After Fanny left in 1890 Lieutenant Compton Charles Domvile (1868-1906) rented the house with his wife Eleanor and family. However he died at sea in 1906. Lieutenant Colonel Alfred Edwin Jones and his family then became the tenants until about 1916 when it was rented to the Brooke family.

== The Brooke family ==
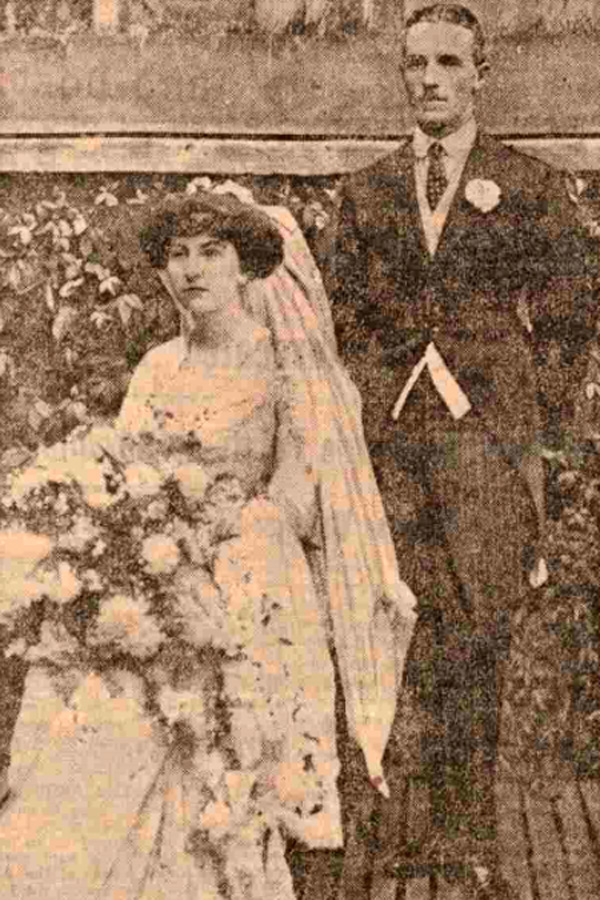
Sir Richard Brooke and Lady Marion Brooke wedding 1912

Sir Richard Christopher Brooke 9th Baronet (1888-1981) and Lady Marion Dorothea Brooke lived at the Elms between 1916 and 1946. They rented the house for some years and then bought it in 1927. Richard was born in 1888. He was the eldest son and heir of Sir Richard Marcus Brooke, 8th Baronet. He was educated at Eton College and gained the rank of Lieutenant in the Scots Guards. He succeeded as the 9th baronet in 1920. In 1923 he graduated from Christ Church, Oxford with a Master of Arts. He held the office of County Councillor for Worcestershire between 1928 and 1946 and the office of Justice of the Peace for Worcestershire in 1929. In 1931 he held the office of High Sheriff of Worcestershire.

In 1912 he married Marion Dorothea Innes-Cross who was the daughter of Arthur Charles Innes-Cross of Dromantine House, County Down. The couple had two children, one daughter and one son.

After they bought the house in 1927 they added two large projecting wings to the entrance front. They decided to turn The Elms into a horse racing stud and the Brookes family was frequently mentioned in the newspapers. Their most famous horse was “King Salmon” who came second in the 2000 guineas and the Derby as a three-year-old.

In 1946 the Brooke family sold the Elms and it became a hotel. It still serves this function today.
