= Astley Hall =

Astley Hall may refer to

- Astley Hall, Chorley, country house in Lancashire, England
- Astley Hall, Stourport-on-Severn, country house in Worcestershire, England
