= Worcestershire County Museum =

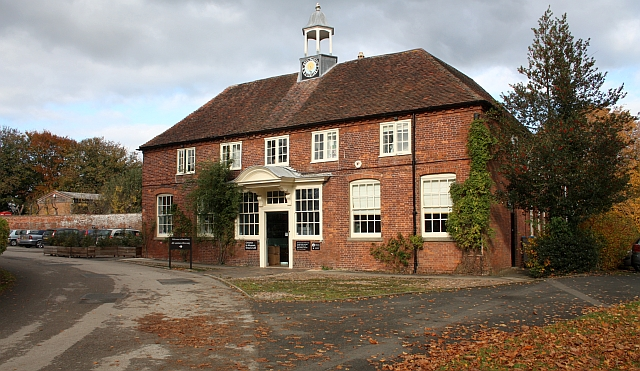
- Established: 1966
- Location: Hartlebury Castle, Hartlebury, Worcestershire, England
- Coordinates: 52.3392°N 2.2420°W
- Type: local museum

Worcestershire County Museum is a local museum located within Hartlebury Castle in Hartlebury, Worcestershire, England, near the City of Worcester. The Museum is one of three sites run by Museums Worcestershire, a Museums Service run in partnership between Worcester City Council and Worcestershire County Council.

The County Museum's displays and objects originally came from the personal collection of the Parker family who lived at Tickenhill Manor, Bewdley. Their intention was to represent folk customs and trades of Worcestershire, and they donated almost 30 tonnes of historic materials. In 1964, the north wing of Hartlebury Castle was re-purposed for the County Museum and it opened to the public there in 1966.

The collections include archaeological items, costumes, domestic objects, and toys. There are also a Victorian schoolroom and a Transport Gallery. Other facilities include a nature reserve, cafe, and gift shop.
