= Pool House, Worcestershire =

Grade II listed house in Astley, Worcestershire

Coordinates: 52°18′47.52″N 2°18′3.08″W

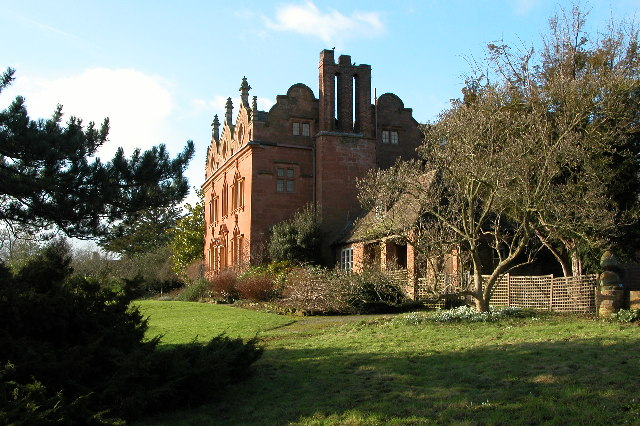
Pool House

Pool House is a Grade II* listed house in Astley, in the county of Worcestershire, England.

In the area close to Stourport-on-Severn, there are several large manor and country houses, among which Witley Court, Astley Hall, Pool House, Areley Hall, Hartlebury and Abberley Hall (with its clock tower) are particularly significant.

Pool House dates from the 17th century, with a Gothic Revival front added to the house in 1760. The house is made from red sandstone.
