= Henry Bromley (died 1836) =

Member of Parliament for Worcester

Colonel Henry Bromley (fl. 10 March 1803 – d. 1836) was Member of Parliament for Worcester City from the General Election in October 1806 until he resigned on 13 February 1807, rather than defend a bribery allegation by the defeated candidate.

On 10 March 1803 he inherited the Manorship of Abberley Hall together with the patronage of St. Mary's church in Abberley village.
