= Stourport-on-Severn =

Town in Worcestershire, England

Coordinates: 52.34182°N 2.27624°W

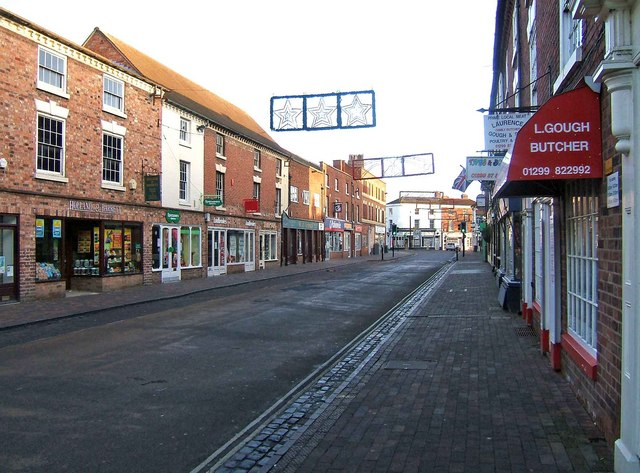
- High Street

- Location within Worcestershire
- Population: 20,653 (2021 Census)
- OS grid reference: SO812715
  - London: 135.4m
- Civil parish: Stourport-on-Severn
- District: Wyre Forest
- Shire county: Worcestershire
- Region: West Midlands
- Country: England
- Sovereign state: United Kingdom
- Post town: STOURPORT-ON-SEVERN
- Postcode district: DY13
- Dialling code: 01299
- Police: West Mercia
- Fire: Hereford and Worcester
- Ambulance: West Midlands
- UK Parliament: Wyre Forest

Stourport-on-Severn, often shortened to Stourport, is a town and civil parish in the Wyre Forest District of North Worcestershire, England, 4 miles to the south of Kidderminster and downstream on the River Severn from Bewdley. At the 2021 census, it had a population of 20,653.

== History and early growth ==
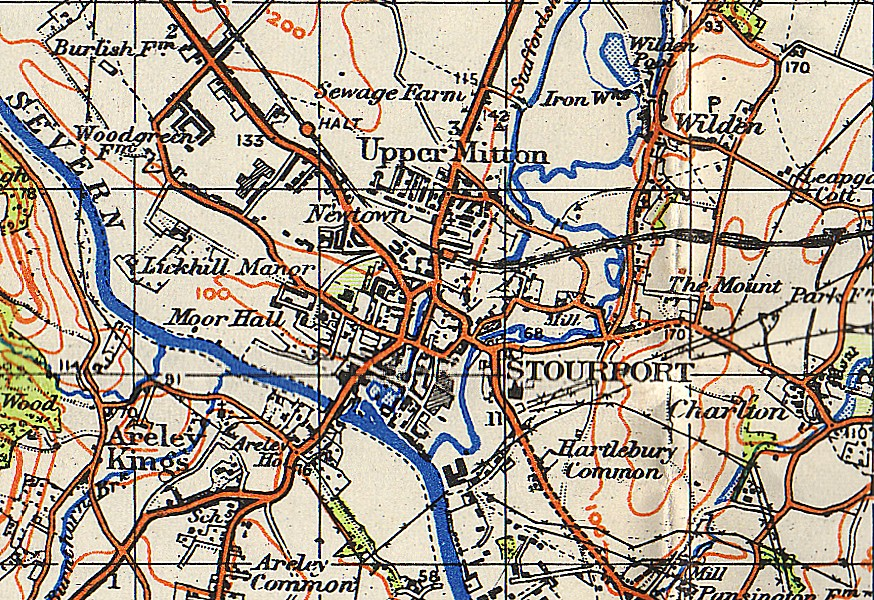
Map of Stourport, 1942

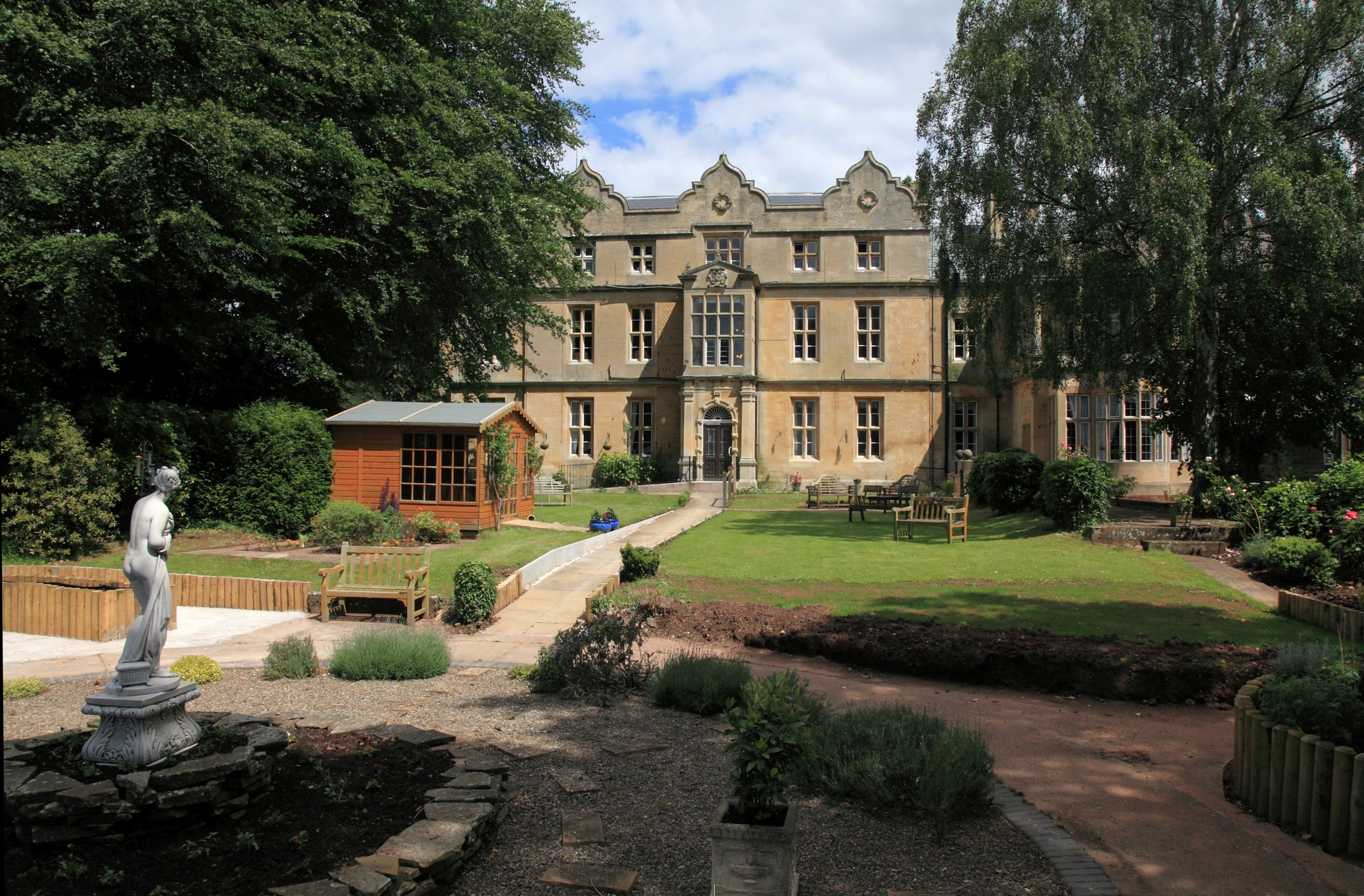
Astley Hall, Stanley Baldwin's home between 1902 and 1947

Stourport came into being around the canal basins at the Severn terminus of the Staffordshire and Worcestershire Canal, which was completed in 1768. In 1772 the junction between the Staffordshire and Worcestershire and the Birmingham Canal was completed and Stourport became one of the principal distributing centres for goods to and from the rest of the West Midlands. The canal terminus was built on meadowland to the south west of the hamlet of Lower Mitton. The terminus was first called Stourmouth and then Newport, with the final name of Stourport settled on by 1771.

The population of Stourport rose from about 12 in the 1760s to 1300 in 1795. In 1771 John Wesley had called Stourport a "well built village" but by 1788 he noted that "where twenty years ago there was but one house; now there are two or three streets, and as trade increases it will probably grow into a considerable town". In 1790 he found the town "twice as large as two years ago".

With the completion of the Worcester and Birmingham Canal in 1816, the revenue of the Staffordshire and Worcestershire Canal plunged sharply and from 1812 the population of Stourport scarcely rose, with many male workers leaving the town.

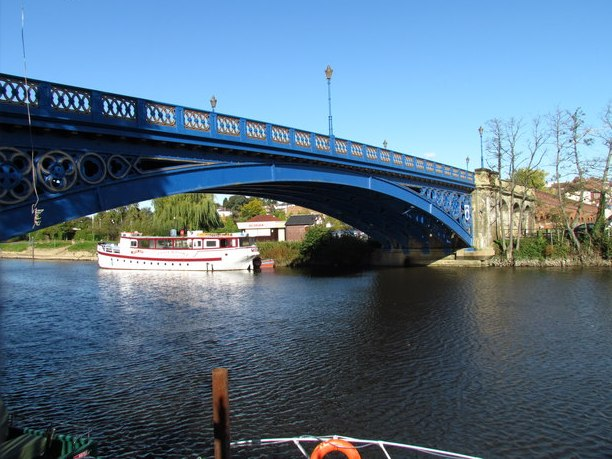
Stourport Road Bridge

In the area close to Stourport there are several large manor and country houses, among which Witley Court, Astley Hall, Pool House, Areley Hall, Hartlebury and Abberley Hall (with its clock tower) are particularly significant. Hartlebury was the residence of the Bishops of Worcester from the early 13th century until 2007, and Astley Hall was the home of Prime Minister Stanley Baldwin, who died here in 1947.

The George Gilbert Scott church replaced an earlier brick church of 1782 by James Rose. This building was never finished, and after suffering storm damage, had to be partly demolished. The current St. Michael's church sits partially within its ruins. The baptismal font was salvaged from the ruins of the old church, and is still used in the current building.

In 1944, the town was the location of a famous address to US army troops by General George S. Patton. Stourport Civic Centre, which is now used as an events venue, was completed in 1966.

In 1968 the Transport Act designated the canal a "cruise way" for pleasure purposes.

The town is the birthplace of singer-songwriter Clifford T. Ward, and the ornithologist Henry Eliot Howard (1873–1940) died there.

== See also ==
- Stourport Ring
- Stourport-on-Severn railway station
- Kidderminster and Stourport Electric Tramway Company
- Stourport power stations
- Tontine Buildings, Stourport
- The Stourport High School and Sixth Form Centre
