= Walter Walsh (courtier) =

Walter Walsh (fl. 1530) was a courtier and Groom of the Privy Chamber at the court of Henry VIII of England. In November 1530, Cardinal Wolsey surrendered the Great Seal to Walsh and Henry Percy, 6th Earl of Northumberland, when they arrived to remove it from him.

He was the son of John Walsh of Shelsley Walsh, the family having held lands there since the 12th century.

In 1531 Henry VIII granted Walsh the manor of Abberley.
