= Astley Hall, Stourport-on-Severn =

Astley Hall
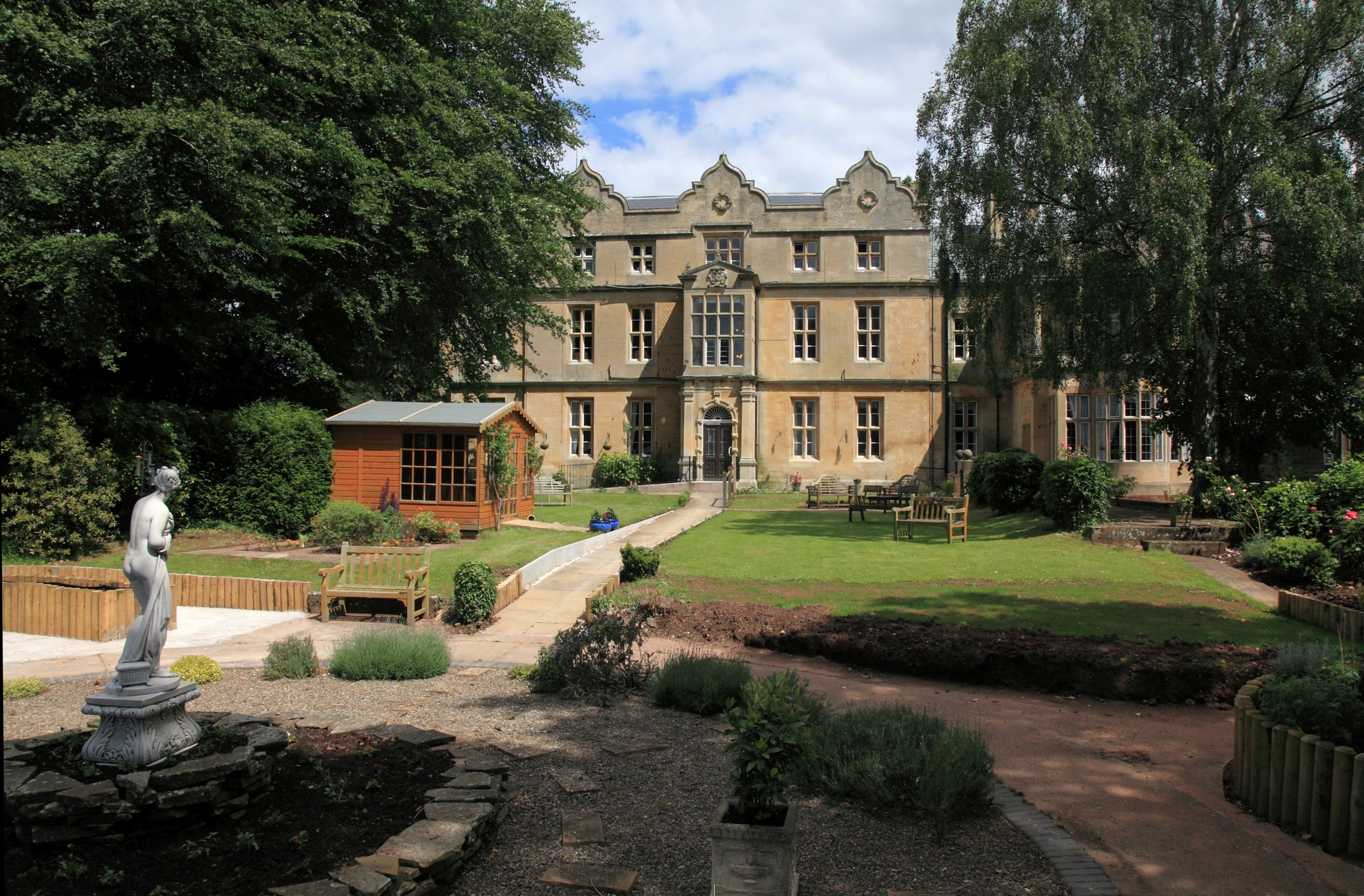
- Interactive map of the Astley Hall area

General information
- Type: Country house
- Location: Astley, Worcestershire, Astley Mill Road, Astley, Stourport-on-Severn DY13 0RW, Stourport-on-Severn, Worcestershire, England
- Coordinates: 52.307605°N 2.295947°W
- Current tenants: Astley Hall Care Home
- Construction started: 1830
- Completed: 1850
- Renovated: 1912, 2012

Listed Building – Grade II
- Designated: 27 November 1984
- Reference no.: 1155604

Astley Hall is a country house in Astley near Stourport-on-Severn, Worcestershire, England. The hall was the home of Prime Minister Stanley Baldwin from 1902 until his death there in 1947. It is now a nursing home.

== Description ==
Astley Hall is a three-storey country house set in 20 acres of parkland, two miles outside Stourport-on-Severn. The house consists of a main block that is linked to an L-shaped stable wing. In addition, the estate features a separate park lodge (Baldwin Lodge), formal garden and kitchen garden. The present buildings date from mid-19th century with early 20th century additions.

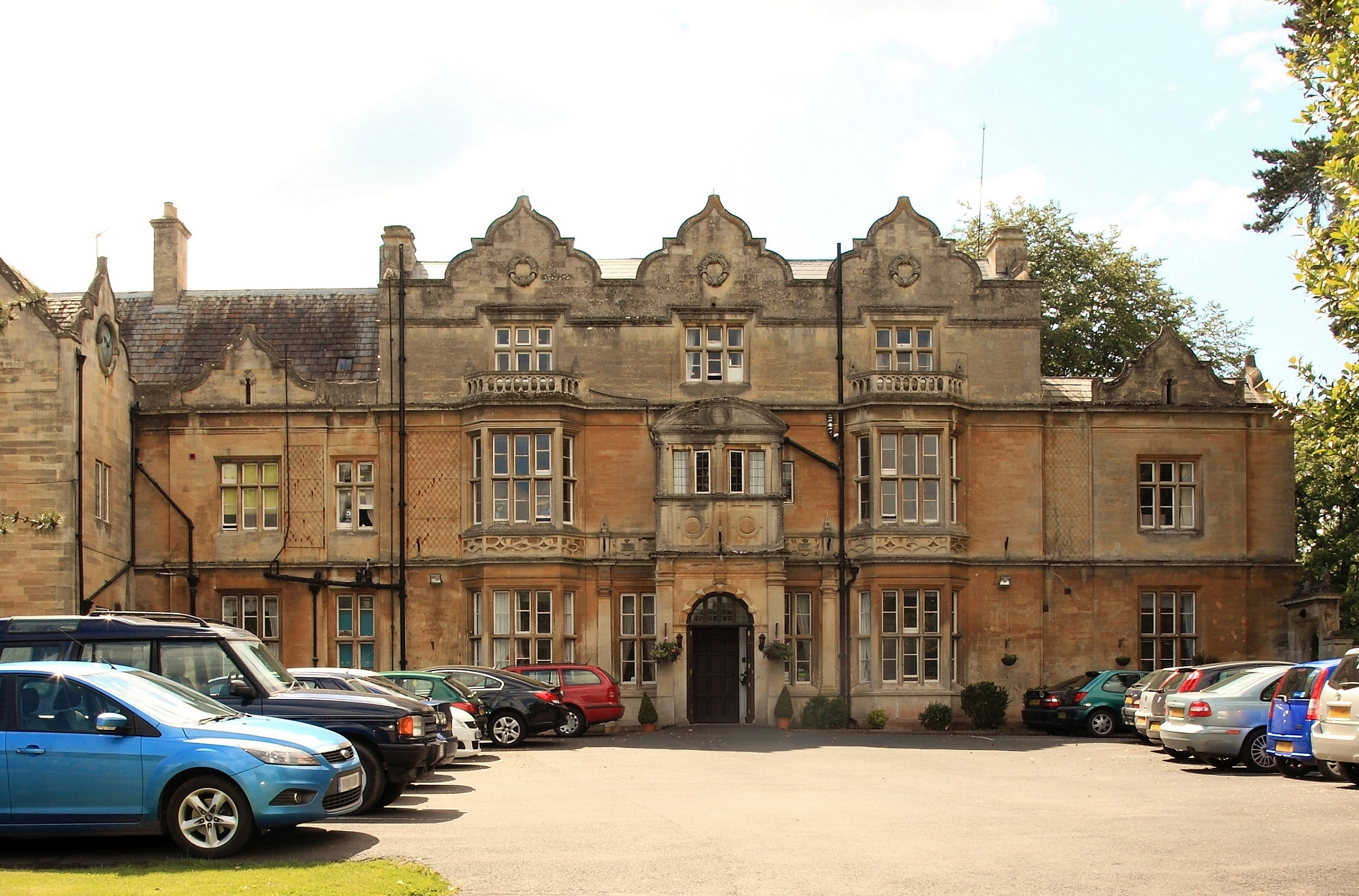
The main front of Astley Hall with its semi-circular headed doorway

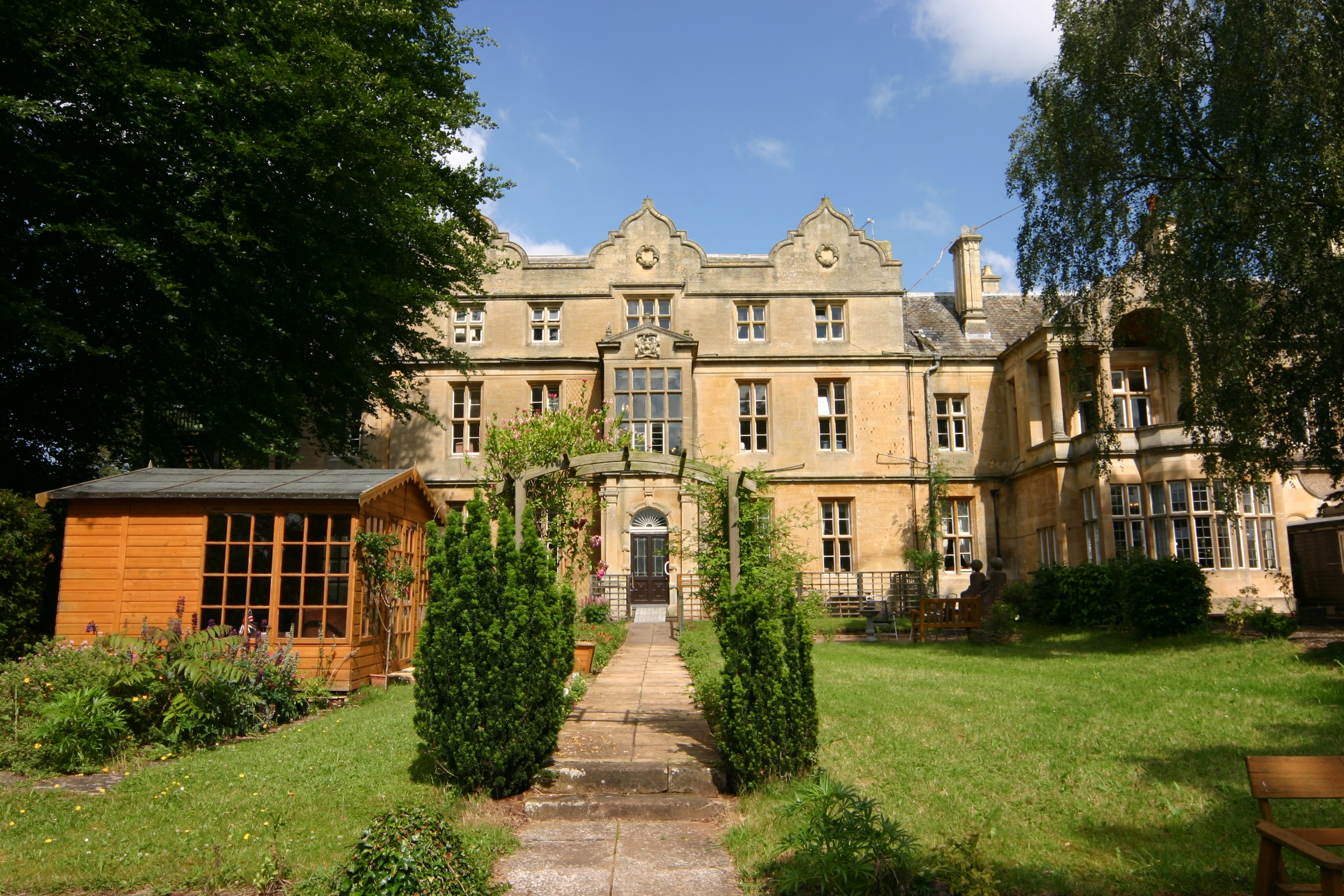
View of the garden front, with the 2-storey pedimented porch on the right

To the right of the main house is a stone Tudor arched garden entrance, to the left of the main house is a slightly later cross-gabled extension with clock and brick stable range with stone dressings.

The main house is an ashlar construction with slate roof. On the roof there are grouped chimneys with decorative shafting. The Jacobean façade features a 3-storey 3-bay centre block and 2-storey single bay wings with cornices, parapets and shaped gables. The outer bays of main block have 2-storey angled bay windows with open parapets.

Access to the main house is via a semi-circular headed doorway with rusticated arch and an Ionic motif above a keystone. Above the porch is inscribed "SLB 1912", which refers to the date of the final acquisition of the house and additions to it by Stanley and Lucy Baldwin. The porch is flanked by a transomed window and Ionic pilasters. On the interior, the entrance lobby has a Jacobean strapwork ceiling.

On the garden front, the main house is slightly plainer with a 2-storey pedimented porch containing a coat of arms. The extension to the right has on first floor Ionic 3-bay loggia with arched central bay, a further extension to right terminates in a rendered pavilion possibly concealing water tower.

== History ==
The main house at Astley Hall was built between 1830 and 1850 for the Lea family. Thomas Simcox Lea, of Astley Hall, was High Sheriff of Worcestershire in 1845. At the beginning of the 20th century it was sold to Stanley Baldwin, who lived at Astley Hall from 1902 until his death in 1947. In 1912 he managed to buy the whole of the house and its additions. Lucy Baldwin died of a heart attack at Astley Hall in June 1945. Stanley Baldwin, then 1st Earl Baldwin of Bewdley, continued to live at Astley Hall until his death there on 14 December 1947.

After Lord Baldwin's death, Astley Hall was sold and became a school, and later a care home. The building was Grade II listed on 27 November 1984. Astley Hall was acquired by its current owners in May 2012. It is now in institutional use as a nursing home and not open to the public.

== Surroundings ==
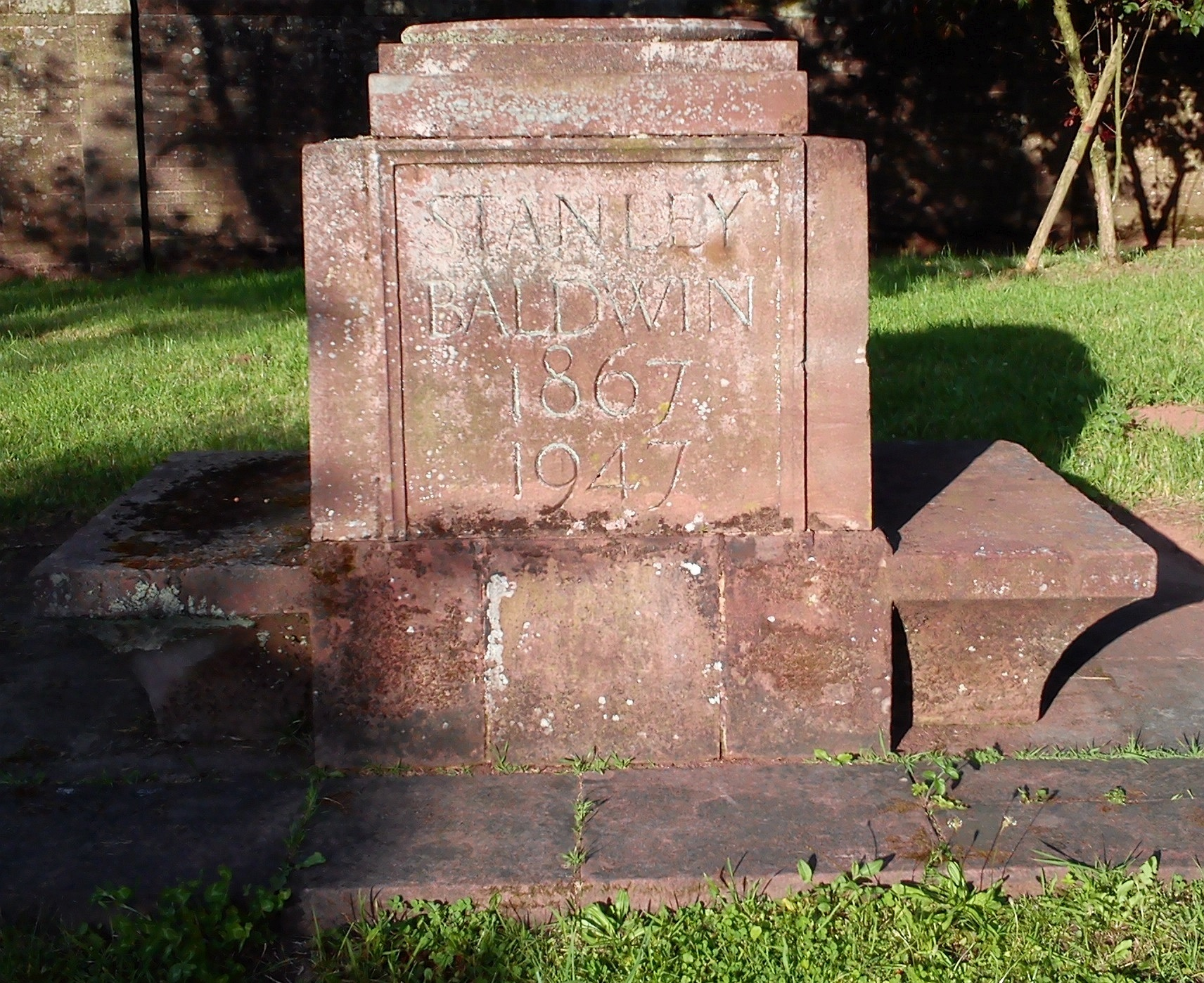
Memorial to Baldwin near his home, Astley Hall

In the Worcestershire area close to Stourport there are several large manor and country houses, among which Witley Court, Astley Hall, Pool House, Areley Hall, Hartlebury and Abberley Hall (with its clock tower) are particularly significant.

There is a monument to Stanley Baldwin just below Astley Hall, directly on the Stourport to Worcester road. After his death, a national appeal failed to raise sufficient money for this memorial. Winston Churchill personally made up the shortfall and attended the dedication. The monument originally consisted of an inscribed base topped with a statue; the statue has since disappeared.
