= Abberley Hall School =

Location
- Abberley, Worcestershire, WR6 6DD; England; 52.2956°N 2.3756°W

Information
- Type: Private school Preparatory school Day and boarding
- Established: 1878
- Founder: Gilbert Ashton
- Closed: 2023
- Department for Education URN: 117011 Tables
- Chair of governors: Carey Leonard
- Headmaster: Jonnie Besley (final)
- Staff: 38
- Gender: Mixed
- Age: 2 to 13
- Enrolment: c. 160
- Houses: Owls, Pewits, Wood Pigeons and Cuckoos
- Website: www.abberleyhall.co.uk/home

Abberley Hall School was a coeducational preparatory day and boarding school with about 160 pupils. It was located between Worcester and Tenbury, near the village of Abberley, Worcestershire, England.

== History ==
The school began in 1878 as the Dame School in Blackheath, Kent. In 1896, it became a private school and was named Lindisfarne. The school was moved to Abberley in 1916, and the property was purchased in 1921 by Gilbert Ashton, a former pupil of Lindisfarne, who took over as headmaster and renamed it Abberley Hall. The school became a trust in 1958, and was managed by a board of governors, as a registered charity. Pupils were drawn from a variety of backgrounds, including families and service personnel living and working abroad, professionals from the Birmingham and Worcester areas, and traditional farming families. The pre-prep and nursery served a more local area. The school became part of the Malvern College Family of Schools in 2019. Its Articles of Association were updated in June 2019 giving Malvern College full control of the school's assets. Abberley Hall was closed for the final time on the 1st July 2023.

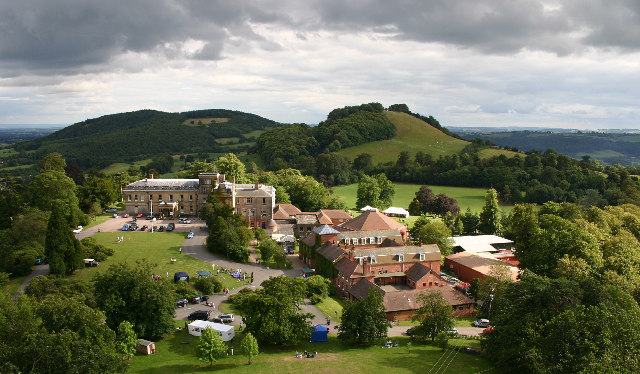
Abberley Hall.

== Campus ==
The campus comprised Abberley Hall, a Grade II* listed building and its gardens and grounds, which are also listed as Grade II on the English Heritage Register of Historic Parks and Gardens of Special Historic Interest in England. The grounds also contained the Grade II* listed Abberley Clock Tower which can be seen as far away as Clent Hill, and which was the setting for the children's book by Gene Kemp, The Clock Tower Ghost.

== Curriculum ==
Pupils followed a curriculum that prepared them for entrance into public schools (independent schools), taking Common Entrance, Winchester Entrance or Scholarship exams. Class sizes were small, averaging 11 pupils. Most subjects had their own dedicated classrooms and there were two science laboratories and specialist facilities for computing, DT, music and PE. The majority of pupils continued their education at Malvern College, Shrewsbury School, King's Worcester, Cheltenham College, Rugby School and Malvern St James. The school also provided for individual pupils with special needs including dyslexia or specific learning difficulties, and moderate learning difficulties.

All pupils took part in the major sports; an Astroturf pitch provided opportunities for hockey, golf, croquet, riding, fishing, archery, shooting, ricochet and climbing. The school had an indoor swimming pool.

== International activities ==
The school ran regular trips to France, where the pupils spent time whilst at Abberley, a week in year 5 and a week in year 7.

== Notable former pupils ==
- Geoffrey Howe, former Conservative Chancellor of the Exchequer, Foreign Secretary, Leader of the House of Commons, and Deputy Prime Minister
- Timothy Eggar, former Conservative Parliamentary Under-Secretary of State for Foreign, Commonwealth and Development Affairs; and Minister for Trade and Industry
- Adam Fleming, billionaire, businessman
- Owen Paterson, former Conservative Member of Parliament for North Shropshire Secretary of State for Environment, Food and Rural Affairs
- Philip Dunne, former Conservative Member of Parliament for Ludlow
- Sir Anthony Quayle, actor
- Antony Beevor, author
- Stephen Beattie VC, naval officer, captain of HMS Campbeltown at the St Nazaire Raid

== Headmasters ==
- Gilbert Ashton (1921–1961)
- Ronnie Yates (1961–1974)
- Michael Haggard (1974–1996)
- John Walker (1996–2014)
- Will Lockett (2014–2020)
- Jonnie Besley (2020–2023)
