= James Lamb (cabinetmaker) =

British cabinetmaker born in 1816

James Lamb (1816–1903), was an English cabinetmaker, whose company produced furniture in the 19th century.

Lamb was born in Manchester and entered the family business upholstering and making furniture. He turned the company, Lamb of Manchester based on John Dalton Street, into a prestigious one, winning medals at the 1862 London Exhibition and again at the 1867 Paris Exhibition.

Examples of his work can be found in Manchester Town Hall, Manchester City Art Gallery and Victoria and Albert Museum. Lamb provided furniture for Abberley Hall. Working over the Victorian era, Lamb's furniture ranges from gothic to aesthetic and neo-classical in style. Lamb worked with designers such as Bruce Talbot and Charles Bevan and the architect Alfred Waterhouse at Manchester Town Hall.
