= Abberley =

Village in Worcestershire, England

Coordinates: 52.3°N 2.366667°W

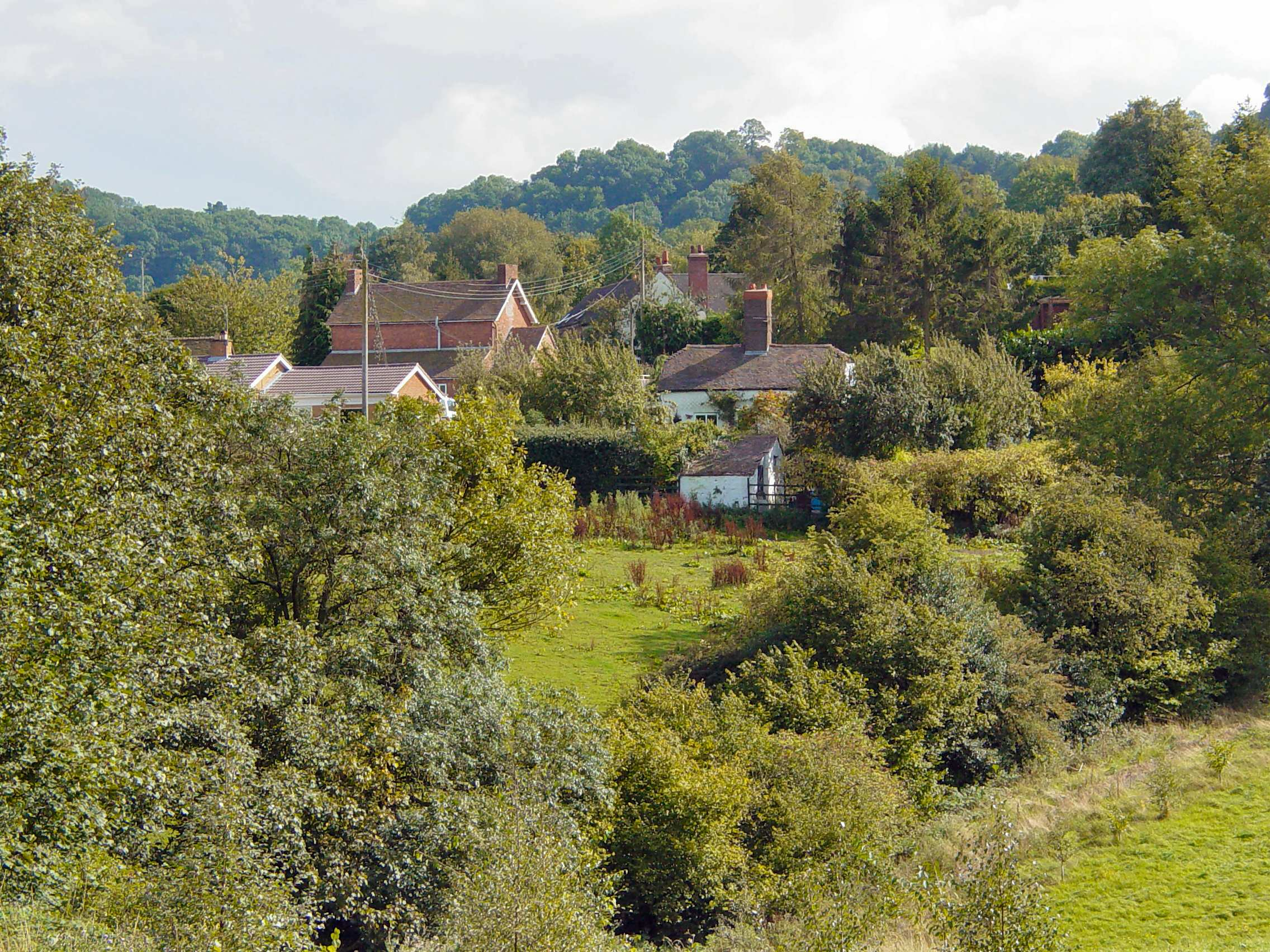

- Location within Worcestershire
- Population: 788
- OS grid reference: SO745675
  - London: 112 miles (180 km)
- Civil parish: Abberley
- District: Malvern Hills
- Shire county: Worcestershire
- Region: West Midlands
- Country: England
- Sovereign state: United Kingdom
- Post town: WORCESTER
- Postcode district: WR6
- Dialling code: 01299
- Police: West Mercia
- Fire: Hereford and Worcester
- Ambulance: West Midlands
- UK Parliament: West Worcestershire

Abberley is a village and civil parish in north west Worcestershire, England.

It is situated on the northern slopes of Abberley Hill, which is 283 metres (928 ft) tall, between the River Severn and River Teme. The civil parish had a population of 788 in the 2021 census.

== Location ==
Abberley lies halfway between Worcester and Tenbury, at the junction with the road from Worcester to Cleobury Mortimer. The parish was described in 1905 as being "about six miles in length, and nowhere more than one mile in breadth". At the 2001 census, it had the youngest population of any Worcestershire village.

== The village ==
Abberley is a village of three distinct parts. The oldest part, known as The Village, clusters around the 12th century and 13th century parish church of St. Michael. To the west, and divided from the Village by farmland and the Cleobury road, is The Common, where the largest part of the population lives, new housing is being added, and there is a village shop-cum-post office. Between the Village and the Common, on the Cleobury road, are the Parochial VC primary school and the Village Hall.

Overlooking the village is the third part of Abberley, The Hill, with scattered farms, houses and cottages across the steep slopes of Abberley Hill.

On the far side of Abberley Hill from the village, to the south of the Worcester-Tenbury road, lies Abberley Hall. Abberley Hill forms part of the Abberley and Malvern Hills Geopark. The Hill lies on the path of the Worcestershire Way, a long-distance hiking trail.

Abberley has two churches, a primary school, a modern village hall, and nearby a country hotel and restaurant, The Elms.

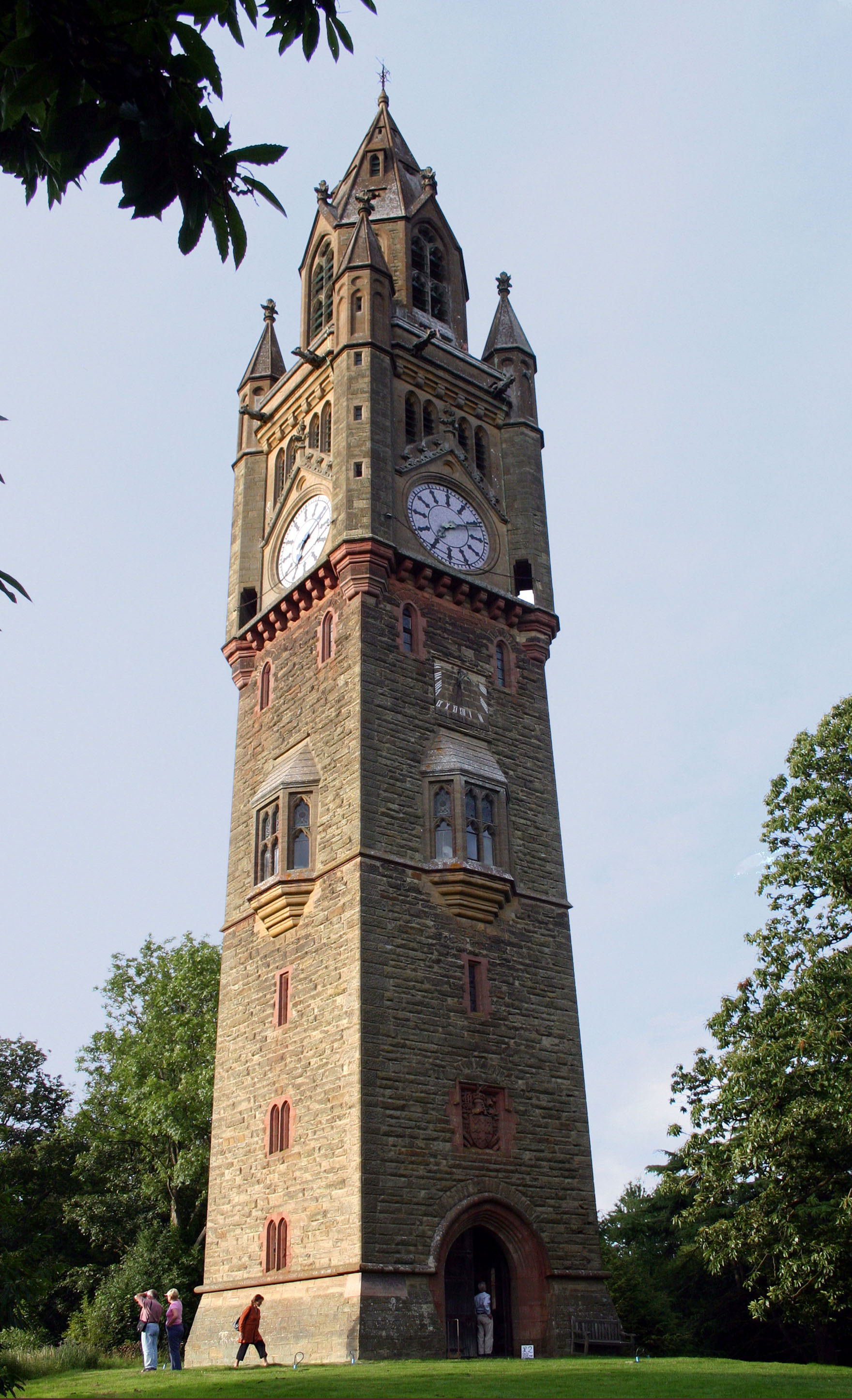
Abberley Clock Tower

Abberley Hall School, a preparatory school set in the grounds of Abberley Hall, closed on 1 July 2023. Abberley Clock Tower is the setting for the children's book by Gene Kemp, The Clock Tower Ghost.

== History ==
The name Abberley probably relates to the 6th century Saxon chief Eobald, by way of Eobaldelega, then Eobaldsleigh. According to The Cambridge Dictionary of English Place-names, Abberley is derived from 'Eadbald's wood or clearing' (Eadbald + lēah). Abberley is recorded in the Domesday Book of 1086–7 as Edboldelege, when it was held by Ralph de Tosny, and was later recorded as Albodeslega in c.1150, Abbedeslegh in 1216, Ab(b)ot(t)eley(e) in 1346–1485 and Aberley in 1480.

In 1405 Abberley Hill was at the centre of a protracted stand-off between two major armies, that of Henry IV camped on Abberley Hill itself and the primarily Welsh army of Owain Glyndŵr camped on nearby Woodbury Hill. Eventually, cut off from their supply line, the Welsh withdrew, never again to penetrate so far into England.

Abberley was in the upper division of Doddingtree Hundred.

On 10 March 1803 Colonel Henry Bromley inherited the Manorship of Abberley. As he had no son, on his death in 1836, the manor was put up for sale by his executors and bought by John Lewis Moilliet of Geneva. He built a new house, Abberley Hall, but he died in 1845 before it was completed.

Following the Poor Law Amendment Act 1834 Abberley Parish ceased to be responsible for maintaining the poor in its parish. This responsibility was transferred to Martley Poor Law Union.

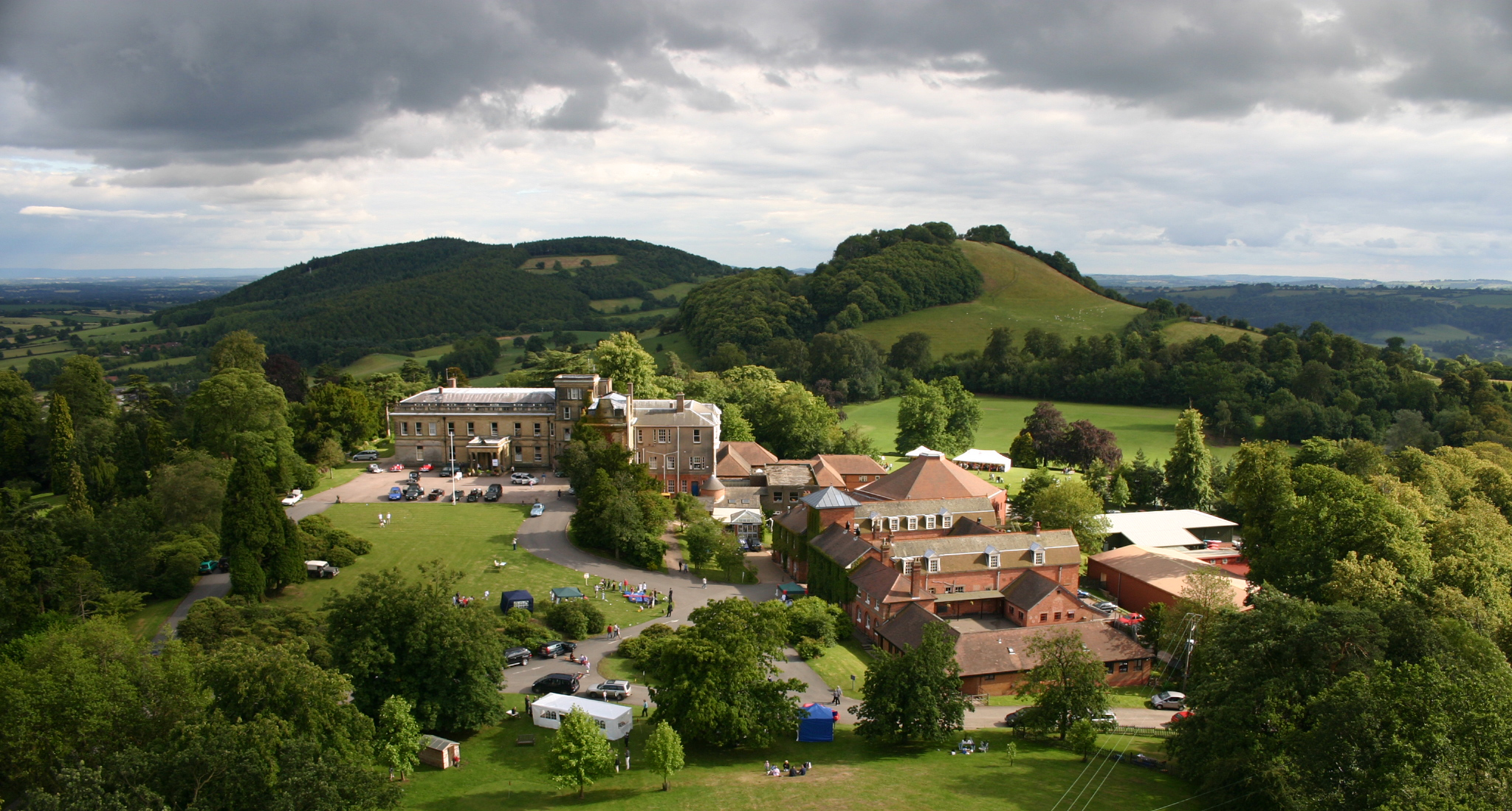
Abberley Hall School

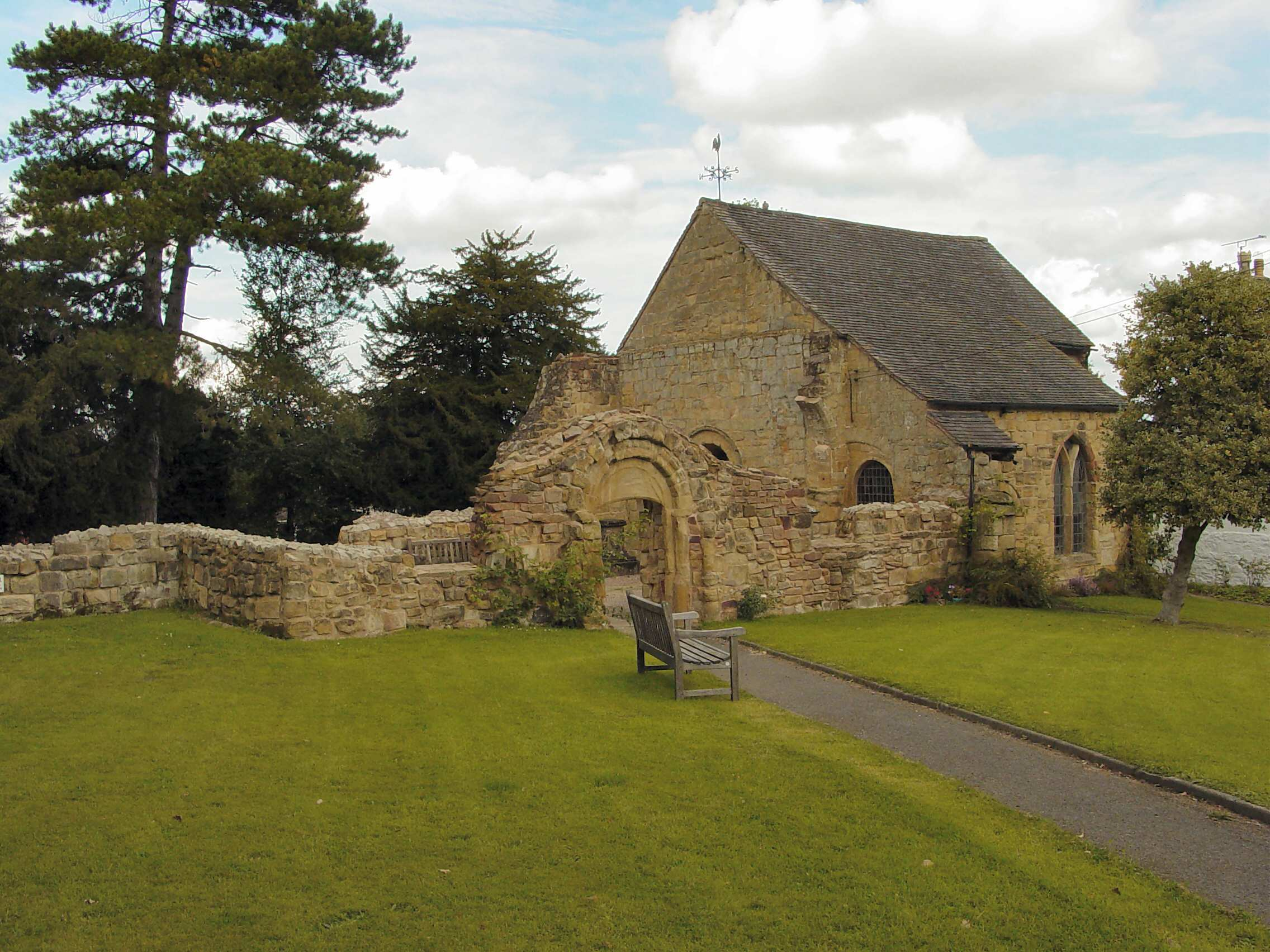
St. Michael's Church

== Churches ==
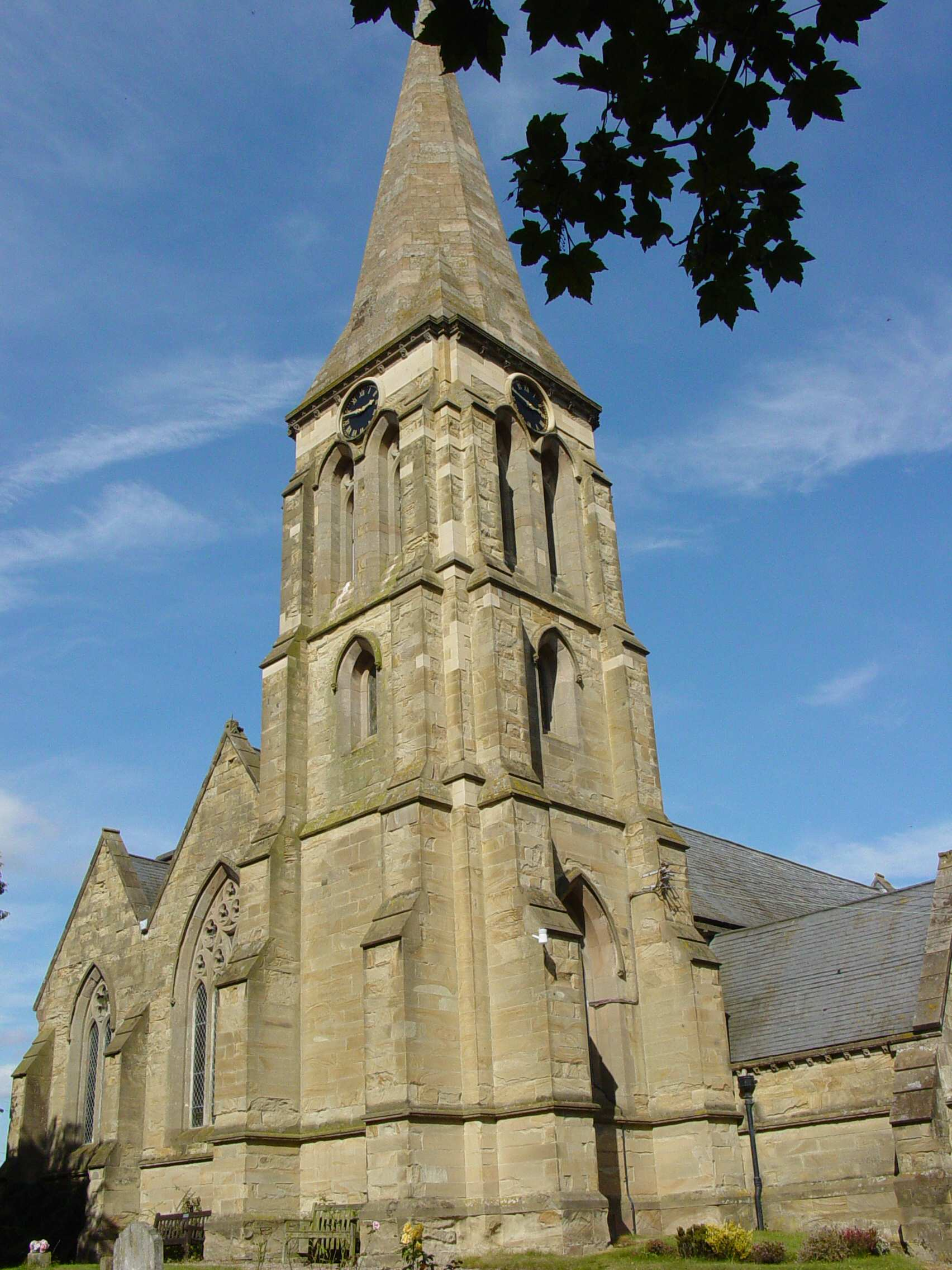
St. Mary's Church

A little to the north, across the Green (developed as a Millennium project) from the village, is the large Victorian St. Mary's church, built between 1850 and 1852. It was designed by John Jenkins Cole and enlarged by the same architect in 1877 following a fire in January 1873.

It was built to replace St. Michael's church when the latter fell into disrepair, though the chancel of St. Michael's was later restored and is still used for some services.

== People ==
- Gilbert Ashton, Headmaster of Abberley Hall School
- Henry Bromley, Member of Parliament for Worcester City and Lord of the Manor
