= Abberley Hall =

Country house in Worcestershire, England

Coordinates: 52°17′44″N 2°22′32″W

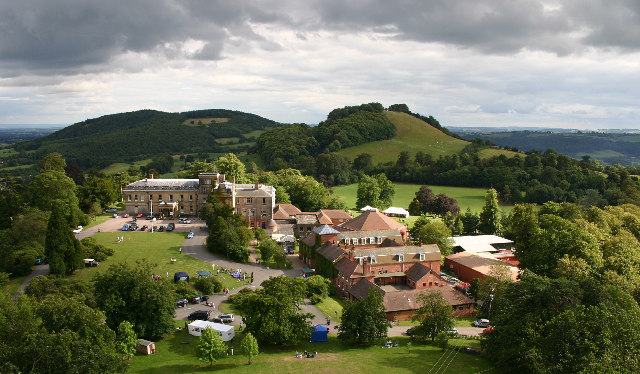
Abberley Hall.

Abberley Hall is a country house in the north-west of the county of Worcestershire, England. The present Italianate house is the work of Samuel Daukes and dates from 1846 to 1849. Since 1916 it has been occupied by Abberley Hall School. It is a Grade II* listed building. The gardens are listed as Grade II on the English Heritage Register of Historic Parks and Gardens of Special Historic Interest in England. In the area close to Stourport-on-Severn there are several large manor and country houses, among which Witley Court, Astley Hall, Pool House, Areley Hall, Hartlebury Castle and Abberley Hall (including Abberley Clock Tower) are particularly significant.

== History ==
Throughout the medieval period, the estate on which Abberley Hall stands was a possession of the de Toeni family of Elmley Castle, Worcestershire. A 'chief messuage' was mentioned in 1309, and Habington says that "Abberley seemethe to have byn of owld the principall seat of the Lord Thony in this shyre". In the 1530s, Leland referred to a castle at Abberley, but there is no other evidence the house was more than a manor house. King Henry VIII gave the estate to his page of the privy chamber, Walter Walsh, in 1531, and the house descended in that family to William Walsh, the poet and critic (died 1708), from whom it passed by marriage to the Bromleys. Nothing is known of the house prior to the publication of a drawing in Treadway Russell Nash's History of Worcestershire which shows a three-storey house with a five-bay centre, single-bay projecting wings, a prominent cupola, and a door with a broken segmental pediment. This may date from William Walsh's ownership (1682–1708) or that of his successor, Francis Bromley (1708–c. 1740). An irregular wing suggests that the early 18th-century appearance was due to the remodelling of the previous house rather than a new build. When Bromley died in the 1830s, leaving seven daughters and no son, his executors decided to sell the estate, which comprised less than 800 acres (3.2 km^{2}) and was heavily encumbered by debts.

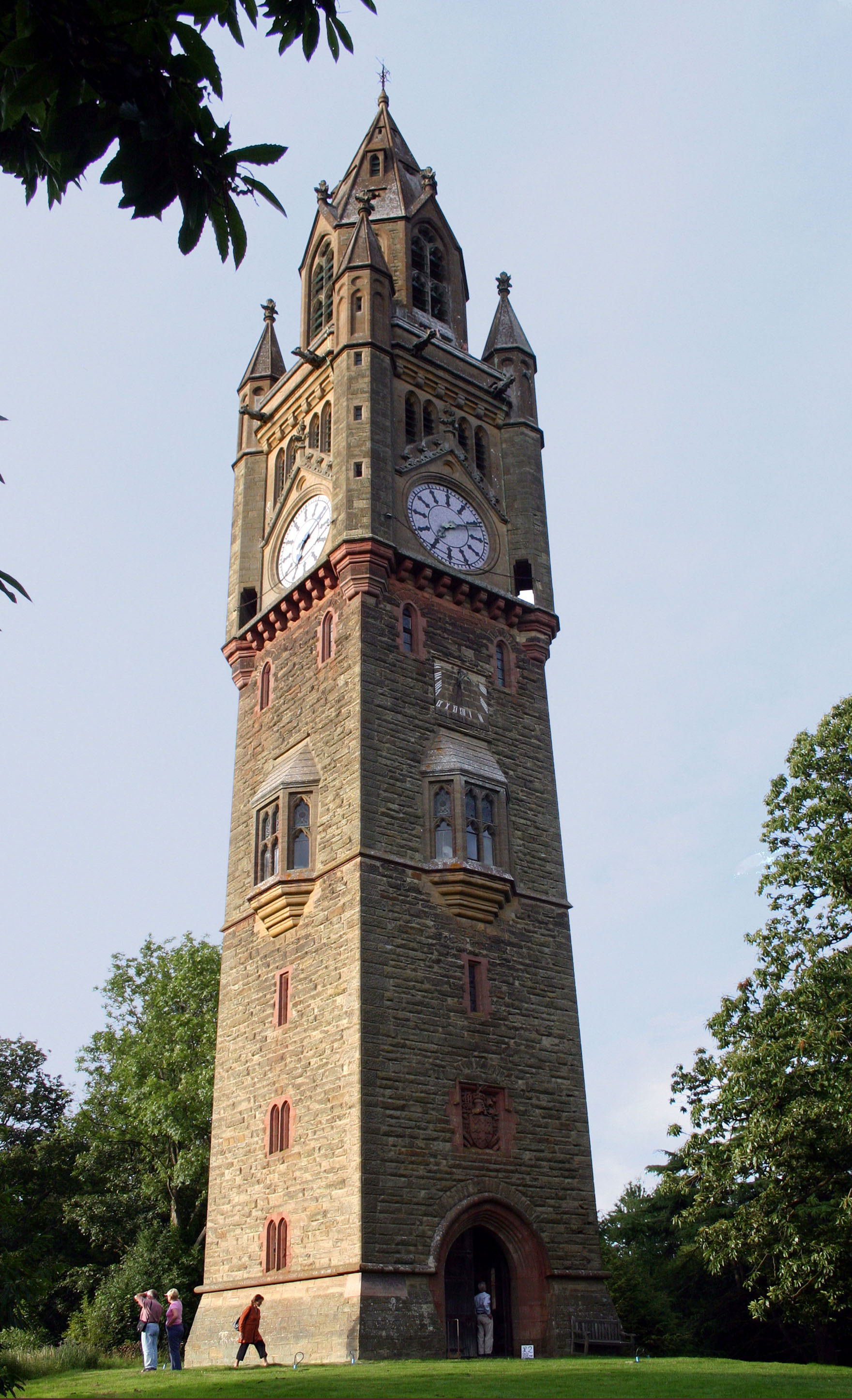
The Clock Tower, 1883–85

The old house was in very poor repair, and the purchaser in 1836, John Lewis Moilliet, pulled it down and employed Samuel Daukes to build an Italianate replacement; this was Daukes' first major country house commission. Moilliet died in 1845 and that Christmas his new house burned down. Moilliet's widow and son promptly employed Daukes to rebuild the house in 1846–49 on the old foundations and apparently to the original design. The house was extended and redecorated internally by J P St Aubyn for a later owner, John Joseph Jones, an Oldham cotton magnate, in about 1883. James Lamb of Manchester produced furniture for the interiors. The house has neoclassical interiors, somewhat altered by St Aubyn, who introduced a series of black chimneypieces. The top of the belvedere on the house was removed in 1962, and a Brutalist house for the headmaster was attached to the garden front, c. 1970–75.

A park was referred to as early as 1280, and Habington in the 17th century mentions "a park on a mighty hill". In 1836, it contained 192 acres (0.78 km^{2}). St Aubyn also built a clock tower (now Grade II* listed) in the grounds in 1883–85, and the main entrance lodge. The North Lodge and estate buildings are by John Douglas, c. 1888, although an earlier lodge is referred to in 1753.

As a school, Abberley Hall had won much acclaim, with The Good Schools Guide calling it "A delight" but closed in mid 2023 owing to financial difficulties.

== Ownership history ==
=== de Toeni family (until 1487) ===
- Before 1487: de Toeni family of Elmley Castle

=== Walsh family (1531-1708) ===
- 1531- : Sir Walter Walshe, page of the Privy Chamber
- -c1590: Walter Walshe (b.1550), of Marlborough
- c 1590-1610: Crown
- 1610–45: William Walshe (b. 1581)
- 1645–82: Joseph Walshe (b. 1634), Royalist
- 1682–1708: William Walsh (1663–1708), MP, Gentleman of the Horse, poet

=== Bromley family (1708-1837) ===
- 1708- : Francis Bromley in right of his wife Anne (née Walsh)
- -1769: William Bromley
- 1769–1803: Robert Bromley, d.s.p.
- 1803–1837: Colonel Henry Bromley

=== Moilliet family (1844-1867) ===
- 1844–45: John Lewis Moilliet, banker of Birmingham and Geneva
- 1845–67: James Moilliet. High Sheriff of Worcestershire in 1861.

=== Jones family (1867-1916) ===
- 1867–80: Joseph Jones V (1817–1880), an Oldham coal/cotton and banking magnate.
- 1880–88: John Joseph Jones (1830–1888), cousin of Joseph Jones V, and son of William Jones Sr (1st Mayor of Oldham).
- 1888–1902: William Jones Jr (1832–1902), High Sheriff of Worcestershire in 1899; brother of John Joseph Jones.
- 1902– : Frederick William Jones, son of William Jones Jr.
- -1916: James Arthur Jones, brother of Frederick William Jones.
