= Abberley Clock Tower =

Clock tower in Abberley, Worcestershire, England

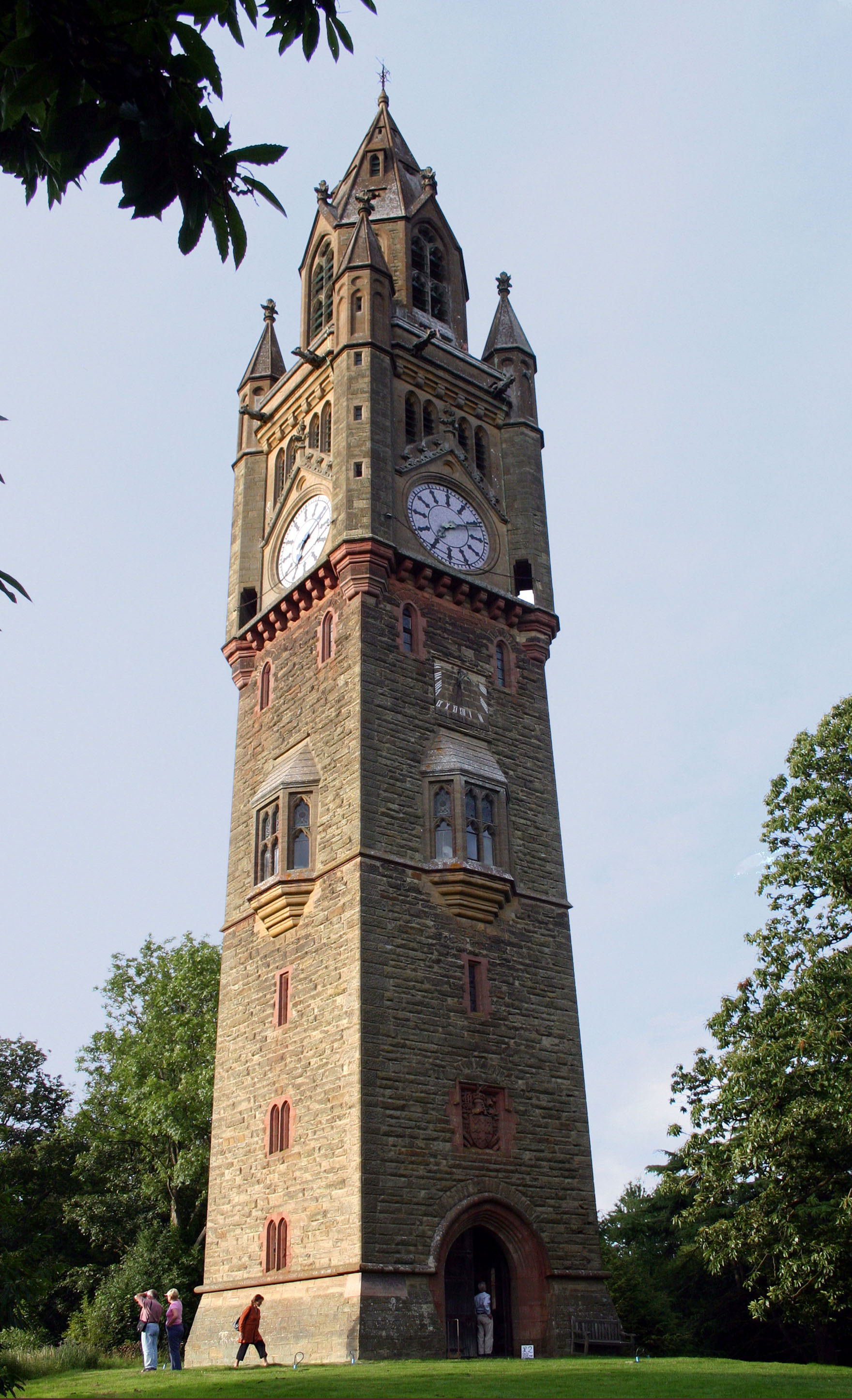
- Interactive map of the Abberley Clock Tower area

General information
- Status: Private building
- Type: Clock tower
- Coordinates: 52.29745°N 2.37572°W
- Construction started: 4 May 1883
- Completed: October 1884
- Opened: 2 May 1885
- Cost: £7980 (equivalent to £1,088,762 in 2023)
- Client: John Joseph Jones
- Owner: Abberley Hall School

Height
- Height: 161 feet (49 m)

Design and construction
- Architects: James Piers St Aubyn; Clock by J. B. Joyce of Whitchurch
- Architecture firm: Patman and Fotheringham

References
- http://www.abberleyhall.co.uk/clock_tower

Abberley Clock Tower is a prominent, distinctive clock tower in Abberley, Worcestershire, England. Built by James Piers St Aubyn around 1883 for Abberley Hall it is now part of Abberley Hall School. It is a Grade II* listed building and claimed to be visible from six counties.

The Worcester Journal of 9 May 1885 gives a description of the clock and the opening ceremony.

The foundation stone was laid on 4 May 1883 by Sarah Amelia Jones, wife of the owner of Abberley Hall. It rises to a total height of 161 feet (49 m) from the ground level, and was built with local grey sandstone quarried on the estate, relieved with red Alveley sandstone and yellow Somersetshire oolite. The base of the tower is 25 feet (7.6 m) square externally, and 15 feet (4.6 m) internally. The walls have a thickness of 3 feet (0.91 m) and taper to 23 feet (7.0 m) wide above the plinth. The first 70 feet (21 m) of the tower is plain, above this height angle turrets are introduced, between which the four clock dials are arranged under crocketted canopies. At 100 feet (30 m) from the ground, the tower becomes an octagonal lantern, pierced with windows, and at 123 feet (37 m) commences the spire capping, which is perforated with numerous lucarns. The diameter of each clock dial is 10 feet (3.0 m). Just above the entrance doorway is an heraldic shield wrought in red sandstone, with the family arms and motto “Deo Adjuvante”. Higher still, above the oriel on the ame side of the tower is a sun dial with the inscription “Sol me vos umbra”.

The tower is divided into several stages or fllors. On the lower floor is a spacious entrance, to the right of which is the doorway of the spiral staircase. The entrance contains an inscription engraved on a brass tablet, let into the masonry “In memory of Joseph Jones, of Abberley Hall, Esq. born 18th October 1816, died 15th October 1880. This tower was erected by his cousin and heir, John Joseph Jones of Abberley Hall, Esq, 1883-1885”.

The floor above the oriel room is set apart for the clock and carillon machine, and over that is the dial room, while a stage higher are the 20 bells, arranged in three tiers, and occupying a height of about 30 feet (9.1 m). Mr. J.P. St Aubyn, of the Temple, London, was the archived, Messrs, Patnam and Fotheringham, London, the contractors, and Mr. J. Dampier, clerk of the works. The bells were cast by Messrs, Taylor and Co, Loughborough. The hour bell, b flat, has a weight of 3 tons, 18 cwt, 2 qrs. and is 6 feet (1.8 m) in diameter. The total weight of all the bells is nearly 21 long tons (21,000 kg).

The carillon machine is the work of Messrs. Gillett and Co., Croydon. It is made to play a tune at every third hour - three, six, nine and twelve o’clock. The tunes are 42 in number, pricked upon six barrels, which are studded with 3,000 brass pins each. The motive power is derived from weights amounting to 15 cwt in all. The great variety of tunes is obtained by having a series of moveable barrels, which are taken out and exchanged as often as desired.

The clock was made by J.B. Joyce of Whitchurch, Salop. It shows time upon four mosaic dials, strikes the Westminster quarters upon four bells, and the hour on the large bell already described. The escapement is Denison’s gravity. The variations in temperature on the pendulum are obviated by its being composed of zinc and iron. The pendulum beats 1½ seconds, the ball weighs 2½ cwt.
