= List of Sites of Special Scientific Interest in Worcestershire =

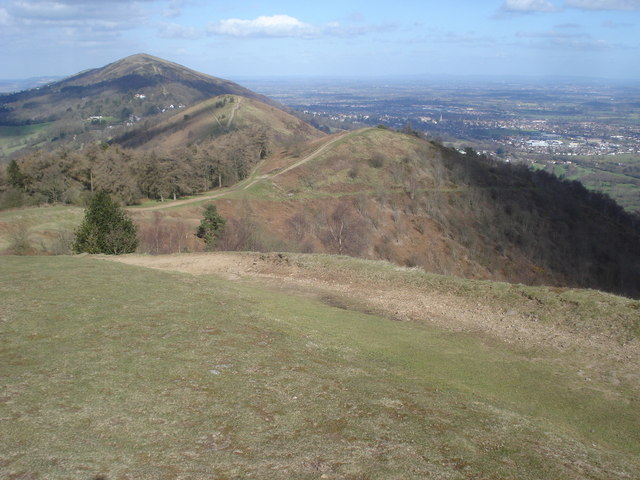
The Malvern Hills, an SSSI on the boundary of Worcestershire and Herefordshire

This is a list of the Sites of Special Scientific Interest (SSSIs) in Worcestershire, England. In England the body responsible for designating SSSIs is Natural England, which chooses a site because of its fauna, flora, geological or physiographical features. As of 2012, there are 106 sites designated in this Area of Search. There are 15 sites with a geological interest, and 106 listed for biological interest. Five sites are designated for both reasons.

Natural England took over the role of designating and managing SSSIs from English Nature in October 2006 when it was formed from the amalgamation of English Nature, parts of the Countryside Agency and the Rural Development Service.

For other counties, see List of SSSIs by Area of Search.

== Sites ==
Site name	Reason for designation		Area^{[A]}		Coordinates & Grid ref^{[B]}	Year in which notified	Other designations	Map^{[C]} & Citation
Site name	Biological interest	Geological interest	Hectares	Acres	Coordinates & Grid ref^{[B]}	Year in which notified	Other designations	Map^{[C]} & Citation
Aileshurst Coppice	✓		2.1	5.2	52.15°N 2.333°W; SO773502	1971		Map
Areley Wood	✓		64.4	159.2	52.34°N 2.311°W; SO789714	1955	NCR	Map
Ashmoor Common	✓	✓	30.2	74.6	52.118°N 2.218°W; SO852466	1975		Map
Avenue Meadow	✓		0.5	1.2	51.97°N 2.252°W; SO828302	1994		Map
Barn Meadow	✓		1.7	4.3	52.024°N 2.307°W; SO790362	1986		Map
Baynhall Meadow	✓		1.1	2.6	52.176°N 2.029°W; SO981531	1993		Map
Beckford Gravel Pit		✓	0.3	0.6	52.023°N 2.035°W; SO977361	1993		Map
Berry Mound Pastures	✓		11.8	29.2	52.396°N 1.866°W; SP092776	1994		Map
Bittell Reservoirs	✓		65.8	162.5	52.376°N 1.972°W; SP020753	1956		Map
Bliss Gate Pastures	✓		2	5	52.358°N 2.374°W; SO746734	1995		Map
Bredon Hill	✓		384.1	949.1	52.065°N 2.061°W; SO959407	1955	NNR, NCR, SAC	Map
Broad Green	✓		1.1	2.7	52.202°N 2.338°W; SO770560	1979		Map
Broadway Hill	✓		15.2	37.5	52.029°N 1.841°W; SP110367	1984	NT	Map
Brotheridge Green Disused Railway Line	✓		2.2	5.5	52.069°N 2.273°W; SO814412	1971	WT	Map
Brotheridge Green Meadows	✓		4.1	10	52.067°N 2.27°W; SO816410	1971	WT	Map
Brown's Close Meadow	✓		2.7	6.6	52.372°N 2.338°W; SO771749	1995		Map
Buckeridge Meadow	✓		2.6	6.4	52.361°N 2.408°W; SO723737	1995		Map
Burcot Lane Cutting		✓	0.4	0.9	52.342°N 2.044°W; SO971716	1991		Map
Burley Dene Meadows	✓		17	42.1	51.989°N 2.274°W; SO813323	1994		Map
Castlemorton Common	✓		79.4	196.2	52.05°N 2.318°W; SO783391	1955		Map
Cooksholme Meadows	✓		8.4	20.7	52.153°N 2.165°W; SO888505	1989		Map
Coombhill Meadows	✓		3	7.4	51.986°N 2.236°W; SO839320	1975		Map
Crews Hill Wood	✓		7.1	17.4	52.174°N 2.392°W; SO733529	1975		Map
Cropthorne New Inn Section		✓	0.1	0.3	52.096°N 2.007°W; SO996442	1991	GCR	Map
Dagnell End Meadow	✓		2.2	5.3	52.321°N 1.927°W; SP051692	1975		Map
Dean Brook Valley Pastures	✓		4.4	10.7	52.243°N 2.082°W; SO945605	1994		Map
Devil's Spittleful	✓		99.3	245.3	52.374°N 2.285°W; SO807751	1955	WT	Map
Dormston Church Meadow	✓		1.3	3.3	52.216°N 2.022°W; SO986575	1994		Map
Duke of York Meadow	✓		2.1	5.1	52.016°N 2.321°W; SO781353	1979	WT	Map
Dumbleton Dingle	✓		50	123.5	52.33°N 2.436°W; SO704703	1961	WT	Map
Earl's Croome Meadow	✓		1.2	3	52.075°N 2.204°W; SO861419	1971		Map
Eastnor Park	✓		153.3	378.8	52.037°N 2.37°W; SO747377	1990	AONB	Map
Eckington Railway Cutting		✓	1.1	2.7	52.074°N 2.12°W; SO919417	1990	GCR	Map
Eymore Railway Cutting		✓	0.2	0.5	52.409°N 2.344°W; SO767791	1991	GCR	Map
Feckenham Forest	✓		229.7	567.5	52.357°N 2.117°W; SO921732	1955	WT, NNR, NCR	Map
Foster's Green Meadows	✓		12.3	30.3	52.282°N 2.035°W; SO977649	1971	WT, NNR, NCR	Map
Frog End Meadow	✓		1.7	4.3	52.268°N 2.514°W; SO650634	1989		Map
Grafton Wood	✓		49.5	122.2	52.206°N 2.044°W; SO971564	1971		Map
Grange Meadow	✓		1.5	3.8	52.131°N 2.286°W; SO805481	1998		Map
Great Blaythorn Meadow	✓		2.1	5.2	52.133°N 2.13°W; SO912483	1994		Map
Grimley Brick Pits	✓		18.8	46.5	52.251°N 2.236°W; SO840615	1955		Map
Hanley Dingle	✓		29.9	74	52.297°N 2.459°W; SO688666	1977	NCR	Map
Hartlebury Common And Hillditch Coppice	✓	✓	90.3	223.2	52.333°N 2.263°W; SO822706	1955	GCR, LNR	Map
Hay Wood And Tinkers' Coppice	✓		30.4	75.1	52.214°N 2.385°W; SO738574	1991		Map
Hewell Park Lake	✓		21.1	52.1	52.318°N 1.987°W; SP010689	1971	WT	Map
Highclere	✓		1	2.6	52.13°N 1.984°W; SP012480	1994		Map
Hillend Meadow & Orchard	✓		0.8	1.9	52.247°N 2.369°W; SO749610	1994		Map
Hopwood Dingle	✓		7.1	17.6	52.384°N 1.956°W; SP031762	1955	NT, WT	Map
Hurcott And Podmore Pools	✓		21.7	53.5	52.399°N 2.213°W; SO856779	1986		Map
Hurcott Pasture	✓		4.7	11.6	52.399°N 2.225°W; SO848779	1995		Map
Hurst Farm Pasture	✓		2.2	5.4	52.38°N 2.106°W; SO929758	1994		Map
Ipsley Alders Marsh	✓		15.1	37.3	52.306°N 1.887°W; SP078676	1971	WT	Map
Kinver Edge	✓	✓	124.2	306.9	52.442°N 2.252°W; SO830827	1968	GCR, NT	Map
Leigh Brook Valley	✓		46.8	115.7	52.16°N 2.374°W; SO745514	1971	WT	Map
Little Royal Farm Pastures	✓		3.3	8.1	52.366°N 2.098°W; SO934742	1994		Map
Long Meadow, Thorn	✓		5.2	12.9	52.195°N 1.979°W; SP015552	1971	WT	Map
Lord's Wood Meadows	✓		6.7	16.6	52.194°N 2.393°W; SO732552	1995		Map
Lower Saleway Farm Meadows	✓		4.5	11	52.24°N 2.113°W; SO924602	1998		Map
Lyppard Grange Ponds	✓		1.1	2.7	52.198°N 2.178°W; SO879556	2000	SAC	Map
Madeley Heath Pit		✓	2.7	6.8	52.39°N 2.063°W; SO958769	1991	GCR	Map
Mains Wood	✓		8.6	21.2	52.045°N 2.52°W; SO644386	1969		Map
Malthouse Farm Meadows	✓		5	12.4	52.049°N 2.286°W; SO805390	1985		Map
Merries Farm Meadows	✓		1	2.3	52.018°N 2.313°W; SO786356	1994		Map
Micklefield Meadow	✓		1.3	3.1	52.044°N 2.274°W; SO813384	1988		Map
Monk Wood	✓		62.8	155.2	52.245°N 2.29°W; SO803608	1971	WT. BC	Map
Monkwood Green	✓		7.8	19.3	52.24°N 2.293°W; SO801602	1975	WT. BC	Map
Mutlow's Orchard	✓		0.9	2.2	52.056°N 2.297°W; SO797398	1975		Map
Napleton Meadow	✓		1.1	2.7	52.136°N 2.206°W; SO860487	1994		Map
Naunton Court Meadows	✓		5	12.4	52.169°N 2.07°W; SO953523	1994		Map
Nine Holes Meadows	✓		3.9	9.5	52.3°N 2.573°W; SO610670	1994		Map
Northwick Marsh	✓		5.1	12.5	52.219°N 2.243°W; SO835579	1988		Map
Oakland Pasture	✓		1.1	2.6	52.357°N 2.09°W; SO940732	1994		Map
Oakley Pool	✓		5.5	13.5	52.243°N 2.16°W; SO892606	1972		Map
Osebury Rock	✓	✓	3.2	7.9	52.197°N 2.386°W; SO737555	1955	GCR	Map
Penny Hill Bank	✓		0.8	1.9	52.251°N 2.363°W; SO753615	1975	WT	Map
Penorchard & Spring Farm Pastures	✓		15.4	38.2	52.429°N 2.087°W; SO942812	1994		Map
Pipershill Common	✓		15.9	39.4	52.283°N 2.064°W; SO957650	1956		Map
Poolhay Meadows	✓		2.9	7.1	51.975°N 2.25°W; SO829307	1975		Map
Portway Farm Meadows	✓		2.5	6.2	52.191°N 2.022°W; SO986548	1993		Map
Puxton Marshes	✓		12.9	32	52.397°N 2.256°W; SO827777	1985		Map
Quarry Farm Meadow	✓		1	2.5	52.248°N 2.368°W; SO750612	1994		Map
Rabbit Wood	✓		16.1	39.7	52.218°N 2.063°W; SO958578	1971		Map
Ranters Bank Pastures	✓		2.2	5.4	52.371°N 2.41°W; SO722749	1995		Map
Rectory Farm Meadows	✓		16.1	39.8	52.042°N 2.117°W; SO921382	1994		Map
River Stour Flood Plain		✓	17.6	43.6	52.357°N 2.263°W; SO822732	1990		Map
River Teme	✓		441	1089.6	52.366°N 2.725°W; SO507745	1996	AONB, SAC	Map
Romsley Hill	✓		13.6	33.7	52.409°N 2.062°W; SO959790	1994		Map
Romsley Manor Farm	✓		9.1	22.4	52.408°N 2.051°W; SO966789	1993		Map
Rookery Cottage Meadows	✓		5.8	14.4	52.249°N 2.007°W; SO996612	1994		Map
Rough Hill & Wirehill Woods	✓		52	128.6	52.276°N 1.924°W; SP053642	1990	WT	Map
Rye Street Meadows	✓		5.5	13.5	52.018°N 2.315°W; SO785355	1975		Map
Salt Meadow, Earl's Common	✓		2.8	6.9	52.23°N 2.059°W; SO961591	1975		Map
Showground Meadow, Callow Hill	✓		0.8	2.1	52.363°N 2.386°W; SO738739	1995		Map
Shrawley Wood	✓		102.3	252.7	52.289°N 2.284°W; SO807657	1955	NCR	Map
Sling Gravel Pits		✓	1.1	2.6	52.402°N 2.082°W; SO945782	1959	GCR, NT	Map
Starling Bank	✓		2.2	5.3	52.039°N 2.327°W; SO777379	1994		Map
Stock Wood Meadows	✓		1.8	4.4	52.226°N 2.004°W; SO998586	1994		Map
Stourvale Marsh	✓		9.3	22.9	52.402°N 2.251°W; SO830782	1971		Map
Teddon Farm	✓		4	9.8	52.361°N 2.418°W; SO716737	1995		Map
The Malvern Hills	✓	✓	746.2	1844	52.045°N 2.35°W; SO761386	1954	SAM, AONB, GCR, MHC	Map
Tiddesley Wood	✓		80.9	199.8	52.104°N 2.105°W; SO929451	1986	WT	Map
Trench Wood	✓		62.3	153.9	52.226°N 2.108°W; SO927587	1989	WT	Map
Trickses Hole	✓		2.9	7	52.272°N 1.997°W; SP003638	1994		Map
Tudor Cottage Meadow	✓		0.5	1.3	52.004°N 2.32°W; SO781340	1994		Map
Tunnel Hill Meadow	✓		0.8	1.9	52.125°N 1.971°W; SP021474	1975	WT	Map
Upper Welson Marsh	✓		1.7	4.3	52.156°N 3.036°W; SO292514	1969	WT	Map
Upton Ham	✓		59.3	146.6	52.058°N 2.207°W; SO859400	1989		Map
Upton Warren Pools	✓		42.8	105.7	52.302°N 2.1°W; SO933671	1972		Map
Westwood Great Pool	✓		29.4	72.5	52.268°N 2.179°W; SO879633	1955		Map
Wilden Marsh And Meadows	✓		40.5	100.1	52.366°N 2.254°W; SO828742	1971	WT	Map
Windmill Hill	✓		6.3	15.5	52.123°N 1.899°W; SP070472	1975	WT	Map
Windmill Tump		✓	0.3	0.8	52.013°N 2.202°W; SO862350	1991	GCR	Map
Woodbury Quarry		✓	5.1	12.5	52.27°N 2.377°W; SO744636	1961	GCR	Map
Wylde Moor, Feckenham	✓		11.3	28	52.241°N 1.987°W; SP010603	1981	WT	Map
Wyre Forest	✓		1755.8	4338.6	52.367°N 2.351°W; SO762744	1955	NNR, NCR, WT	Map
Yellow House Meadow	✓		1.8	4.3	52.173°N 2.051°W; SO966527	1993		Map

== Notes ==
^{A} Data rounded to one decimal place.
^{B} Grid reference is based on the British national grid reference system, also known as OSGB36, and is the system used by the Ordnance Survey.
^{C} Link to maps using the Nature on the Map service provided by Natural England.
