= Spennells Valley =

Nature reserve in Worcestershire, England

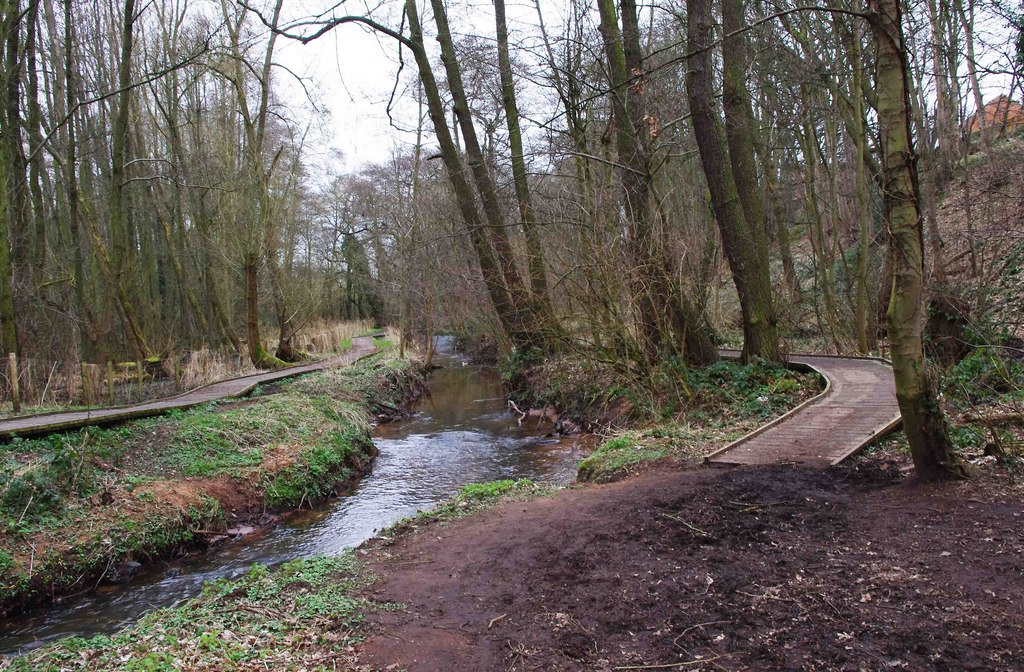
- Hoo Brook in the nature reserve

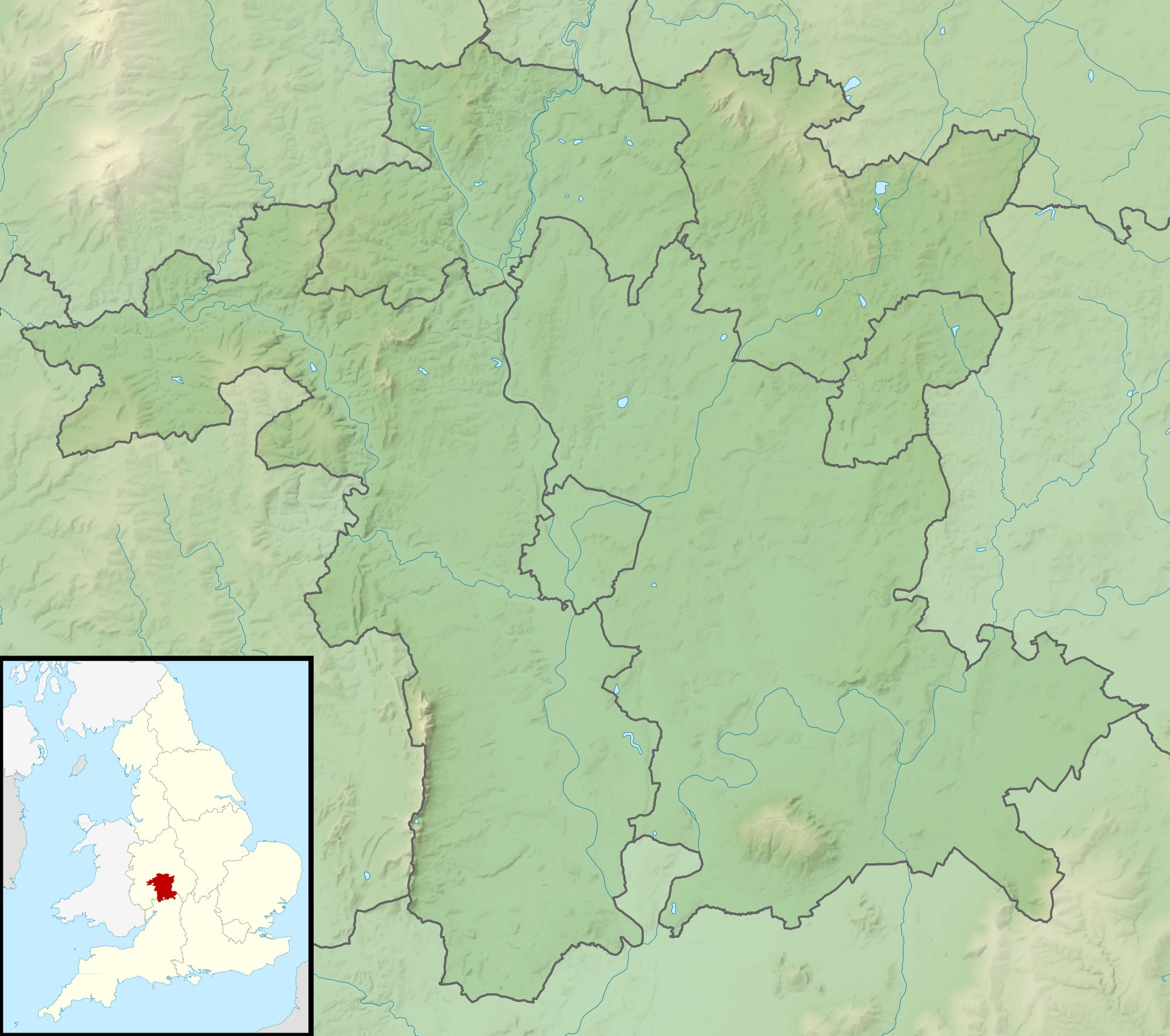
- Location within Worcestershire
- Location: Kidderminster
- OS grid: SO 843 750
- Coordinates: 52°22′19″N 2°14′10″W
- Area: 15.7 hectares (39 acres)
- Operator: Wyre Forest District Council
- Designation: Local nature reserve
- Website: Spennells Valley

Spennells Valley is a local nature reserve in south-east Kidderminster, in Worcestershire, England.

== Description ==
It was declared a local nature reserve (LNR) in 1995, and is owned and managed by Wyre Forest District Council.

The reserve, area 15.7 hectares (39 acres), is situated along the banks of Hoo Brook. It is a link between Wilden Marsh (a nature reserve of Worcestershire Wildlife Trust) to the south-west and the upper Hoo Brook pools to the north-east.

There is dry woodland, damp woodland and marshland. In the damp woodland is alder, willow and black poplar. There is a waymarked boardwalk trail through the reserve.

The reserve is being extended to include part of a neighbouring sports field. It involves the creation of new ponds; it is expected that the project (underway in 2020), which is run in conjunction with the Environment Agency, will increase the biodiversity of the area of Hoo Brook.
