= Castlemorton =

Village and civil parish in England

Coordinates: 52.033333°N 2.3°W

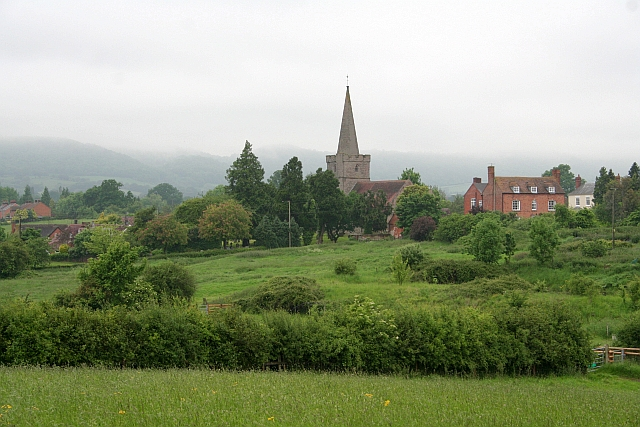

- Location within Worcestershire
- Population: 617 (2021 census)
- District: Malvern Hills District
- Shire county: Worcestershire
- Region: West Midlands
- Country: England
- Sovereign state: United Kingdom
- Post town: Malvern
- Postcode district: WR13
- Police: West Mercia
- Fire: Hereford and Worcester
- Ambulance: West Midlands

Castlemorton is a village and civil parish close to Malvern in the Malvern Hills District in the county of Worcestershire, England. It consists of a village centre, a large common and many farms and houses within the area. In 2013 the Worcestershire Wildlife Trust purchased 42 acres of meadow at Hollybed Farm as part of a project to celebrate the 60th Anniversary of the Coronation of Elizabeth II and restore the meadows as a nature reserve.

In 1992 the Common was the location of the controversial Castlemorton Common Festival, a week-long free festival and rave. The event made national headlines.

The 2015 World War II film Our Father was filmed on location on Castlemorton Common.

== History ==
A medieval motte-and-bailey castle stood to the south of the village, the earthwork remains are still present.

Castlemorton Common was once part of the vast Royal hunting grounds of the Malvern Chase. James I split up much of this hunting ground (examples are Eastnor Castle Estate, Bromsberrow Estate) and Castlemorton Common is the largest remaining tract of unenclosed public land. Much of Castlemorton is today within a designated Area of Outstanding Natural Beauty, and protected as a Site of Special Scientific Interest (SSSI) due to some very rare fauna and flora living within its boundaries.
