= Clows Top =

Village in Worcestershire, England

Coordinates: 52.344962°N 2.416992°W

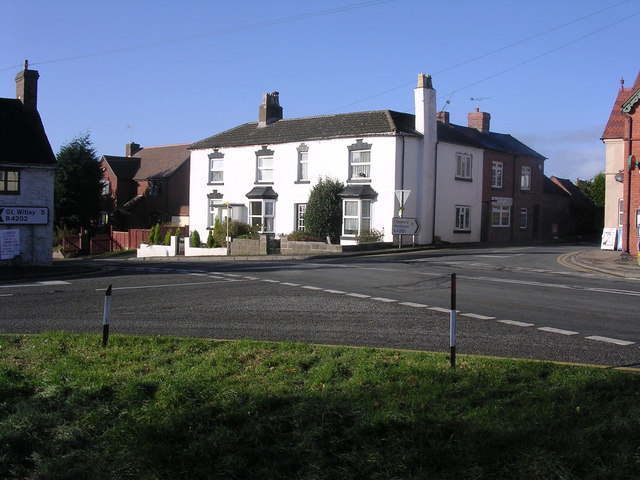

- Location within Worcestershire
- Civil parish: Bayton
- District: Malvern Hills; Wyre Forest
- Shire county: Worcestershire
- Region: West Midlands
- Country: England
- Sovereign state: United Kingdom
- Post town: Kidderminster
- Postcode district: DY14
- Police: West Mercia
- Fire: Hereford and Worcester
- Ambulance: West Midlands

Clows Top is a village in north Worcestershire, England.

There is a village shop/post office, a butcher's, a village hall (named the "Victory Hall") and a mission room. Clows Top lies on the A456 road between Newnham Bridge and Bewdley and on the B4202 between Mawley Oak and Abberley.

The border between the districts of Malvern Hills and Wyre Forest runs through the settlement; Clows Top also includes the tripoint of the civil parishes of Mamble, Bayton and Rock.

The summit of the hill reaches an elevation of 231 metres (758 ft).

Hunthouse Wood, a nature reserve of the Worcestershire Wildlife Trust, is near the village.
