= Upton Warren =

Village in Worcestershire, England

Coordinates: 52.305°N 2.103°W

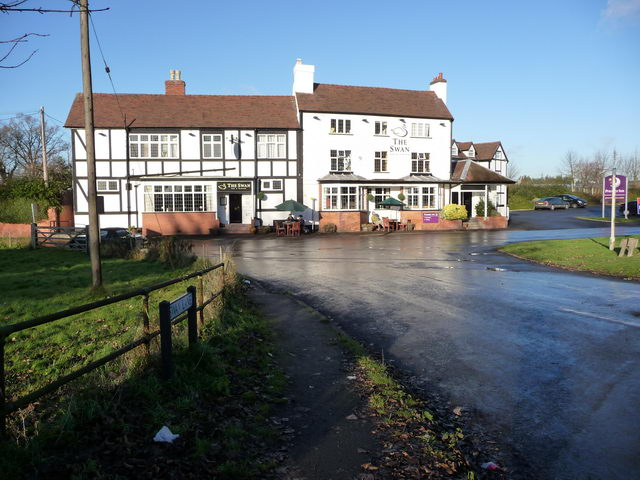
- The Swan

- Location within Worcestershire
- Population: 356 (2021)
- OS grid reference: SO930674
- Civil parish: Upton Warren
- District: Wychavon
- Shire county: Worcestershire
- Region: West Midlands
- Country: England
- Sovereign state: United Kingdom
- Post town: BROMSGROVE
- Postcode district: B61
- Police: West Mercia
- Fire: Hereford and Worcester
- Ambulance: West Midlands

Upton Warren is a village and civil parish in the Wychavon district, in Worcestershire, England. The village is situated just off the A38 road between Bromsgrove and Droitwich Spa, and on the River Salwarpe. In the 2021 UK census, the parish, which also contains the small hamlet of Cooksey Green, had a population of 356.

The village, in the south-east corner of the parish, is situated between two major roads, the M5 motorway to the west and the A38 to the east and south.

East of the village, on the boundary with Dodderhill, is the Worcestershire Wildlife Trust's Christopher Cadbury Wetland Reserve, a nature reserve and a popular location for birdwatching. The reserve consists of several pools created by subsidence as a result of brine extraction in the area.

== Medieval history ==
=== Name ===
The name Upton derives from the Old English upptūn meaning 'settlement higher up', i.e. higher up the river or on higher ground than another place. The affix Warren derives from William fitz Warin, whose father held the village in 1254.

=== Upton Warren ===
Upton Warren was a Manor, for many years inherited alongside Grafton first in the hands of John de Grafton, then the Staffords, followed by the Talbots and Earls of Shrewsbury.

=== Little and Great Cooksey ===
There were two other Manors, Little Cooksey and Great Cooksey, the latter giving its name to the de Cooksey family.

=== Forest law ===
The boundaries of Feckenham Forest were extended hugely by Henry II, which encompassed much of North Worcestershire, including Upton Warren. The area was removed from forest law in 1301 in the reign of Henry III, when the boundaries were moved back.

== St Michael’s Church ==
The Church probably existed at the time of the Domesday Book survey, but was rebuilt before 1300, and consecrated that year. The present building largely dates to the 18th century; the chancel being rebuilt in 1724 and the nave in 1798. The tower dates to the late 15th century.
