= Christopher Cadbury Wetland Reserve =

Nature reserve in Worcestershire, England

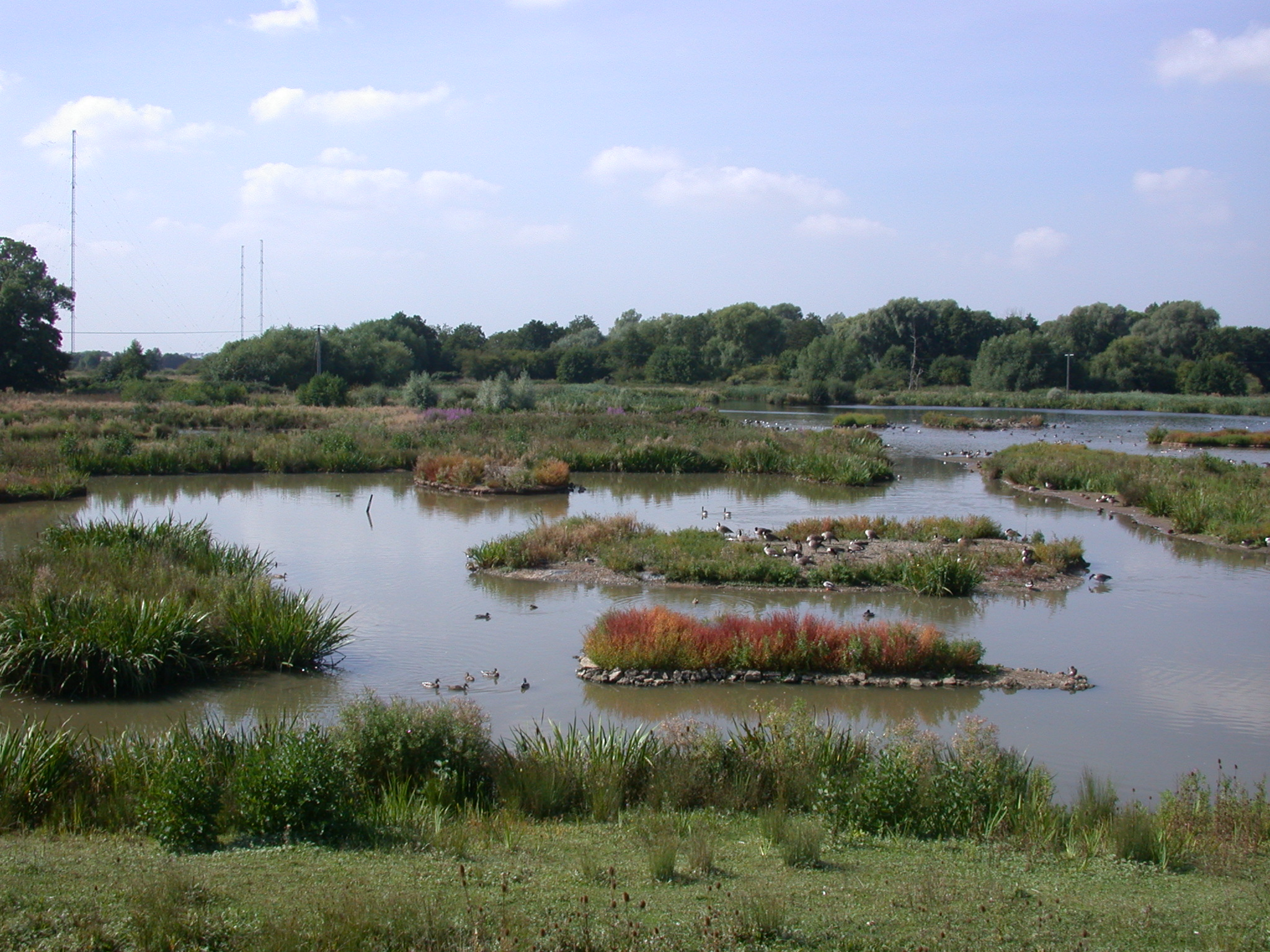
- A view across the reserve

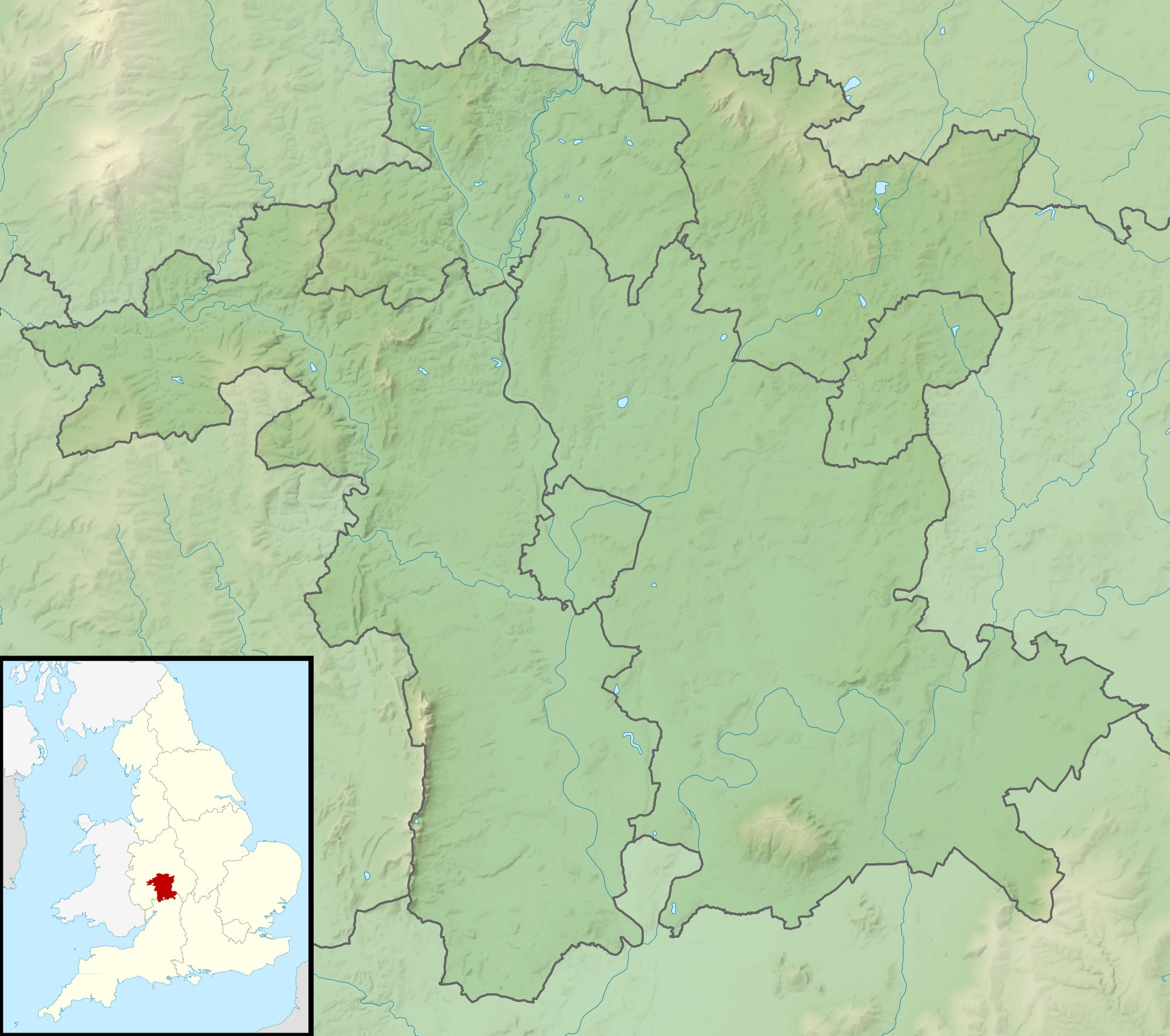
- Location within Worcestershire
- Interactive map of Christopher Cadbury Wetland Reserve
- Location: Upton Warren
- OS grid: SO 935 671
- Coordinates: 52°18′7″N 2°5′48″W
- Area: 27 hectares (67 acres)
- Operator: Worcestershire Wildlife Trust
- Designation: Site of Special Scientific Interest
- Website: www.worcswildlifetrust.co.uk/nature-reserves/upton-warren

The Christopher Cadbury Wetland Reserve is a nature reserve of the Worcestershire Wildlife Trust. It is situated near Upton Warren, between Bromsgrove and Droitwich Spa in Worcestershire, England. The reserve is designated a Site of Special Scientific Interest.

== Description ==
The reserve, area 27 hectares (67 acres), is named in recognition of Christopher Cadbury, who purchased much of the land and paid for many developments and improvements. It is known as a birdwatching site, and there are several bird hides.

=== Moors pools ===
The Moors pools, in the north, are freshwater lakes where there was once agricultural land. A range of wildfowl can be seen here, and it is a breeding place for species including black-headed gull, oystercatcher, lapwing and Cetti's warbler. Snipe and water rail can be seen in winter.

=== The Flashes ===
The Flashes, in the south, are saline pools in areas where brine extraction caused subsidence. There are plants typical of a salt marsh. Species of waders, both breeding and passage birds, may be seen. Scarce species have been spotted, such as ruff, sanderling, turnstone and whimbrel.

=== Links and biodiversity ===
The Trust believes that links between areas of countryside are beneficial for biodiversity; it notes that this reserve is next to the Forest of Feckenham Living Landscape area, and is a link between the Droitwich Canal wetlands, the Worcester and Birmingham Canal, the River Salwarpe and the River Severn.
