= Cropthorne =

Coordinates: 52°06′06″N 2°00′16″W

- Village and civil parish
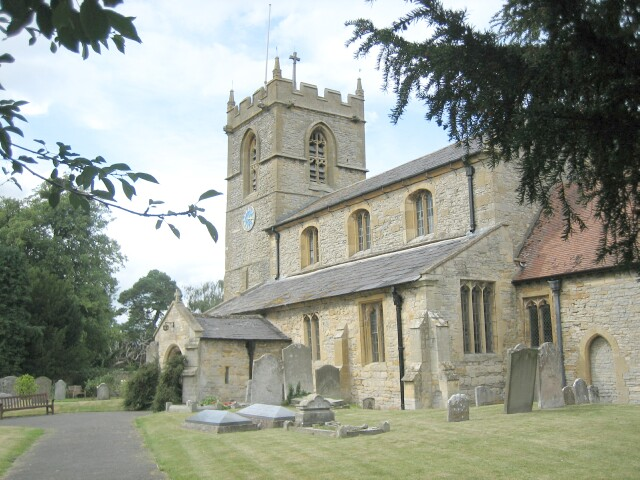
- St Michael's Church, Cropthorne

- Location within Worcestershire
- Population: 723 (2021 census)
  - London: 90 miles
- Civil parish: Cropthorne
- District: Wychavon
- Shire county: Worcestershire
- Region: West Midlands
- Country: England
- Sovereign state: United Kingdom
- Post town: Pershore
- Postcode district: WR10
- UK Parliament: Droitwich and Evesham

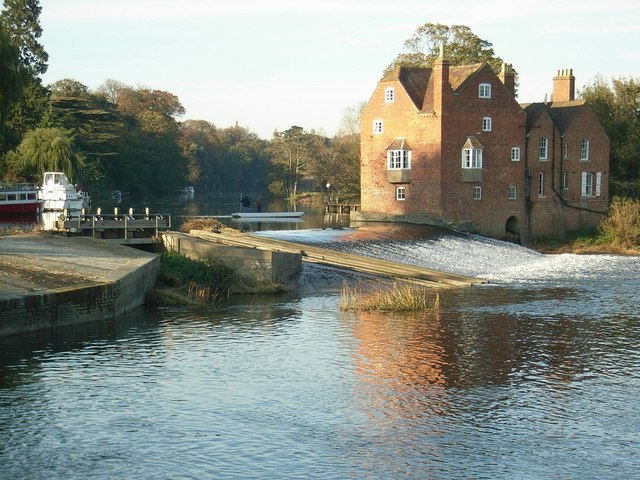
River Avon - Cropthorne Mill

Cropthorne is a village and civil parish in Worcestershire, England within the Vale of Evesham, and on the north-west edge of the Cotswolds. It is approximately 13 miles (21 km) southeast of Worcester, 19 miles (31 km) north of Cheltenham, and 18 miles (29 km) southwest of Stratford-upon-Avon. Cropthorne had a population of 603, in 237 households (2001 census), whilst its 2021 population was 723. Located on a small ridge overlooking the River Avon, its ancient orchards sweep down to the river and offer clear, unbroken views across the vale to the Malvern Hills in the distance. The name Cropthorne possibly derives from the Old English Croppaþorn meaning 'Croppa's thorn tree'. The church is a Grade I listed building. The village has many unique examples of timber-framed thatched cottages from the 16th and 17th centuries, and about half the village is designated as a conservation area. The village has a Site of Special Scientific Interest, Cropthorne New Inn Section.

== History ==
The village is featured in the Domesday Book, and St Michael's Church dates back to the 12th century.

In the year 2000 Cropthorne won the best kept medium village award.

In 2007 Cropthorne and the surrounding area were severely flooded. The B4084 road linking the towns of Evesham and Pershore collapsed and caused major holdups. The repairs took four months to be repaired, at a cost of around £1 million.

== Local amenities and events ==
The Cropthorne Walkabout is an annual event that takes place on the Sunday and bank holiday Monday at the beginning of May each year, to coincide with the blossom season. Several of the historic gardens on the banks of the River Avon are opened to the public.

Cropthorne is on the Vale of Evesham Blossom Trail, a 55 miles (89 km) trail best explored in spring when all the apple, pear, and cherry trees are in bloom.

Cropthorne's primary school serves Cropthorne and the neighbouring village of Charlton. It currently has two pubs, The Bell Inn and The New Inn, both offering food and guest accommodation. The village of Fladbury is situated on the opposite bank of the river, and the two communities are linked by the Jubilee Bridge. The Anglican parishes of Fladbury, Hill and Moor and Cropthorne are combined, with a single rector looking after all of the churches. Children progressing from Cropthorne First School may go on to Bredon Hill Middle School, then Prince Henry's High School in Evesham.

Cropthorne has a large playing field (the Sheppey), with a village hall and children's play area. Youth activities centre on the Sheppey Junior Sports Club, which has junior football teams from U9 to U13. An adult football team also plays on the Sheppey.

Cropthorne has its own Holland House (not to be confused with the house in Kensington). Set in gardens on the edge of the River Avon, the black and white timbered house is now a Christian retreat centre.

== Notable residents ==
- Minnie Holland (d. 1942), local photographer known for her images of Cropthorne.
- Michael Spicer, a former MP for the conservative party.
- Richard Cadbury Barrow and George Corbyn Barrow, both Lord Mayors of Birmingham: the Cropthorne Mill has been in the Barrow Cadbury family for over 150 years.
- Henry Howard Avery - a member of the family of Victorian Entrepreneurs W & T Avery, makers of weighing machines and scales, lived in the village during the late 19th, early 20th centuries. Avery lived in a large black and white timber-framed house known as "The Den", now known as "Holland House". Avery built an extension to the original 16th-century building and had the architect carve "HH AVERY 1904" on an external lintel which can easily be seen from the garden. He also re-designed the garden and grounds which contain an impressive "sunken garden" attributed to Sir Edwin Lutyens.
- Sir William Lawson Tate, an eminent surgeon and pioneer of abdominal surgery, lived in the village.
- James Calado, 2025 FIA WEC champion, was born and raised in Cropthorne.
