= Cropthorne New Inn Section =

Geological Site of Special Scientific Interest in Worcestershire, England

Coordinates: 52.096817°N 2.0065397°W

- Site of Special Scientific Interest
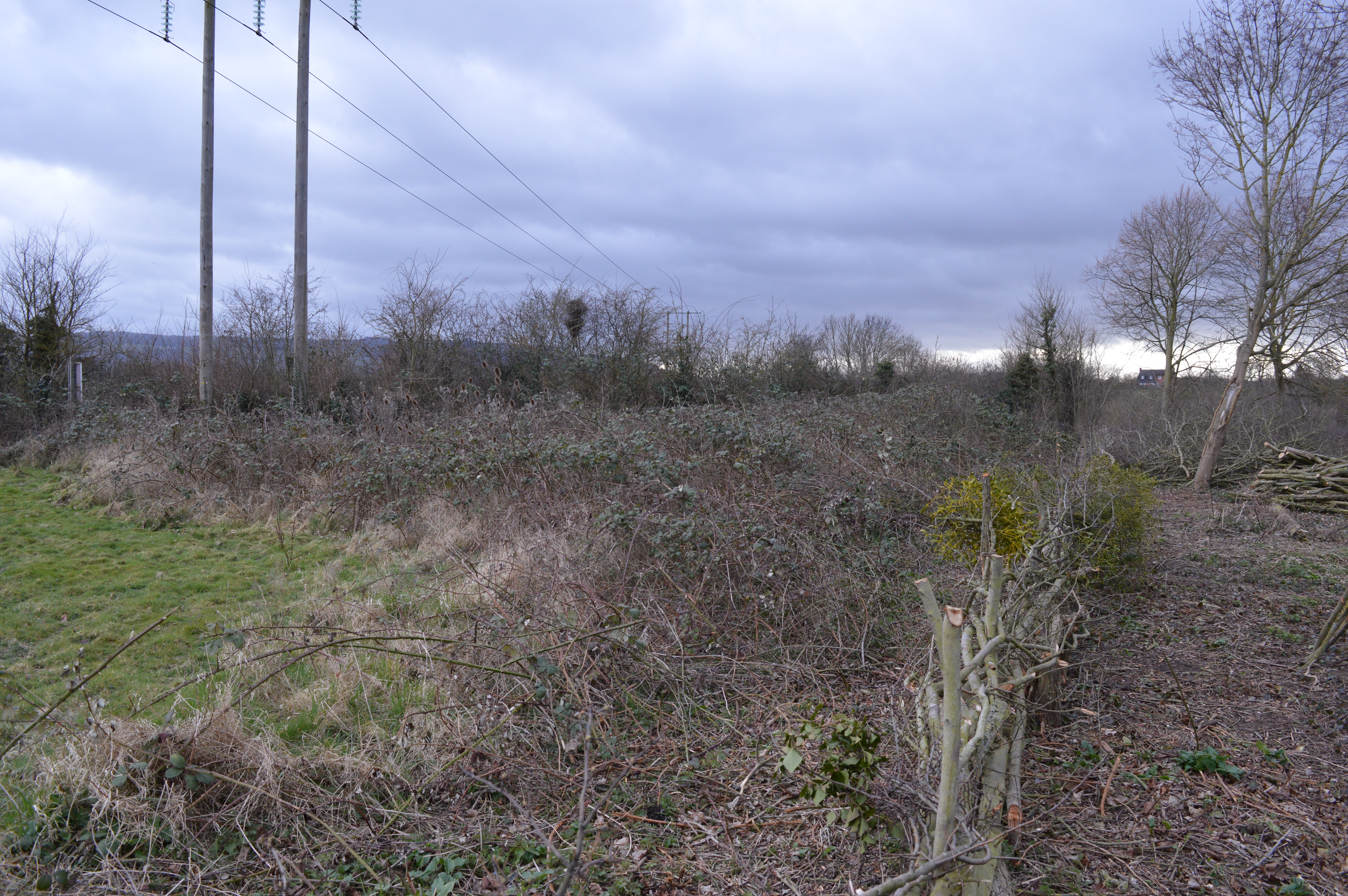
- Location of Cropthorne New Inn Section.
- Area of search: Worcestershire
- Grid reference: SO996443
- Interest: Geological
- Area: 0.12 ha (0.30 acres)
- Notification date: 1991
- Location map: Magic Map

Cropthorne New Inn Section is a 0.12-hectare (0.30-acre) geological Site of Special Scientific Interest in Cropthorne in Worcestershire. It is a Geological Conservation Review site.

The site dates to the Ipswichian interglacial (Marine Isotope Stage 5e) between 130,000 and 115,000 years ago. This was one of the warmest periods of the last half a million years, but there were no humans in Britain. The site has a rich array of mollusc and mammal fossils, including hippopotamus. There are a number of terraces of the River Avon laid down at different periods, and New Inn is a key site for determining their sequence, and for the Pleistocene stratigraphy of the Midlands generally.

There is no public access to the site, which is a triangular area of scrub north of Main Road near the New Inn.

== See also ==
- List of Sites of Special Scientific Interest in Worcestershire
