= Trench Wood =

Coordinates: 52°13′40″N 2°06′32″W

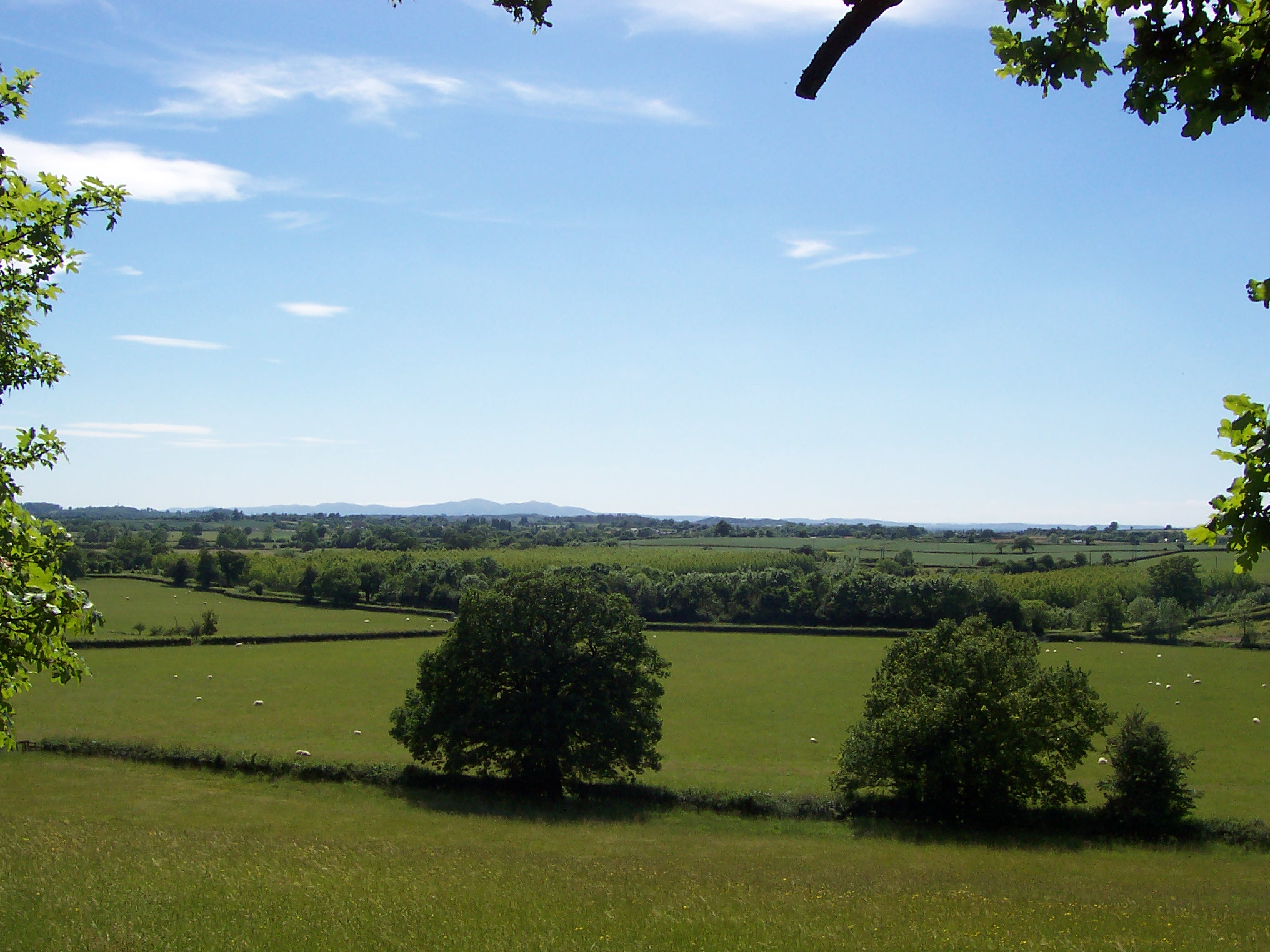
View from Trench Wood towards the Malvern Hills

Trench Wood is a woodland area part managed by the Worcestershire Wildlife Trust and Butterfly Conservation. It is located around 6 miles (9.7 km) miles north-east of Worcester near the small villages of Dunhampstead and Sale Green. The Worcester and Birmingham Canal and the main line railway from Birmingham to the south-west of England both pass just to the west of the wood. The back third of the woodland is in private ownership and is not accessible.

In 2009 the Bat Conservation Trust launched a detail study of 10 counties in England to determine the range of the Bechstein's bat and in 2010 a lactating female Bechstein's was discovered in Grafton Wood, suggesting that there was a breeding colony in the wood or close by. Another Bechstein's was discovered in the same year at Trench Wood. The People's Trust for Endangered Species are funding further research work.
