= Grafton Wood =

Nature reserve in Worcestershire, England

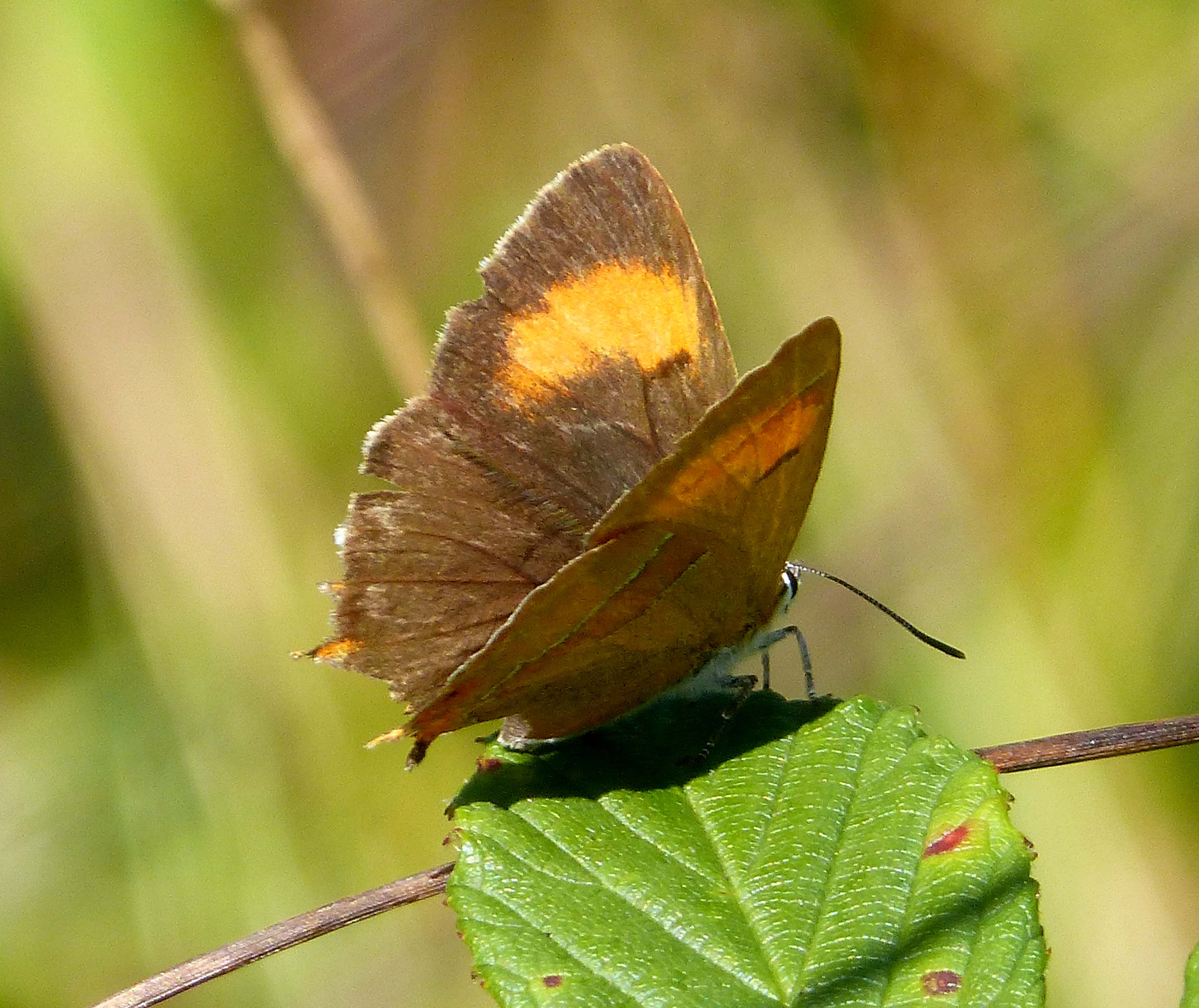
- A brown hairstreak butterfly in Grafton Wood

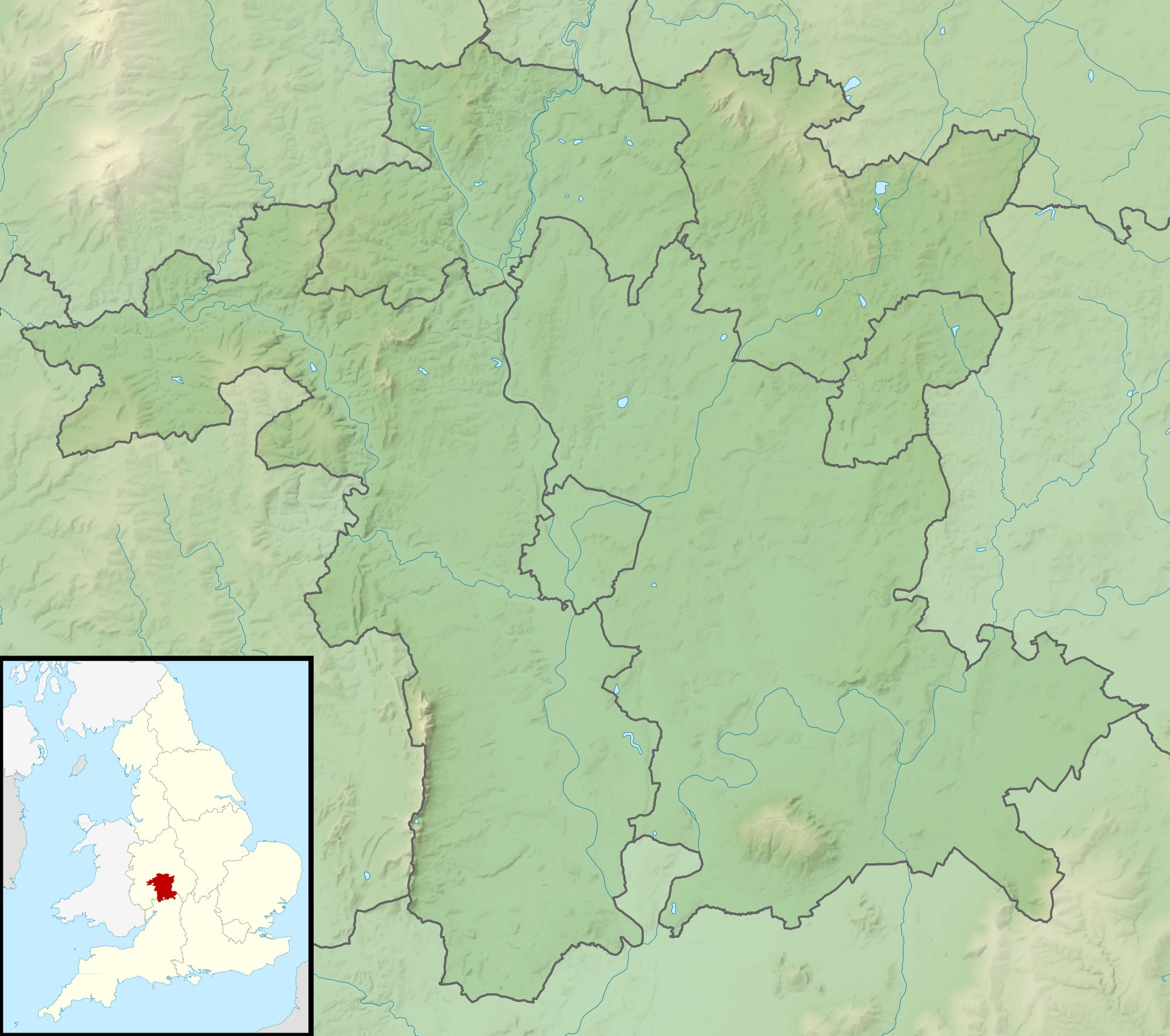
- Location within Worcestershire
- OS grid: SO 972 560
- Coordinates: 52°12′8″N 2°2′32″W
- Area: 56 hectares (140 acres)
- Operator: Worcestershire Wildlife Trust; Butterfly Conservation
- Designation: Site of Special Scientific Interest
- Website: www.worcswildlifetrust.co.uk/nature-reserves/grafton-wood

Grafton Wood is a nature reserve near the village of Grafton Flyford, about 6 miles (9.7 km) east of Worcester, in Worcestershire, England.

== Description ==
The reserve, area 56 hectares (140 acres), is designated a Site of Special Scientific Interest.

It is an ancient wood, originally part of the Forest of Feckenham, and is now jointly owned by the Worcestershire Wildlife Trust and Butterfly Conservation. In October 2014 the two organisations bought Laight Rough, a seven-acre of ancient woodland, adjoining Grafton Wood.

Most of the canopy in Grafton Wood is ash and oak. Until the 1950s, the wood was managed as coppice with standards, providing wood for broom handles, pea sticks and other products; the Trust is aiming today to replicate this traditional wood management.

=== Butterflies and bats ===
Grafton Wood is the centre of the only colony of the brown hairstreak butterflies in the Midlands. Laight Rough is also important for other butterflies such as white admiral, white-letter hairstreak and the silver-washed fritillary. In 2009 the Bat Conservation Trust launched a detail study of 10 counties in England to determine the range of the Bechstein's bat and in 2010 a lactating female Bechstein's was discovered in Grafton Wood suggesting that there was a breeding colony in the wood or close by. The People's Trust for Endangered Species are funding further research work. In October 2014 it was reported that the scarce Brandt's bat has also been found at the 300-year-old woodland.
