= Rowney Green =

Village in Worcestershire, England

Coordinates: 52.344097°N 1.937284°W

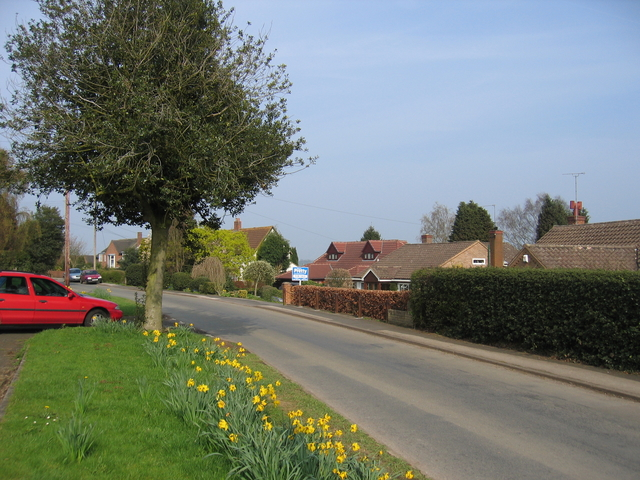
- Rowney Green

- Location within Worcestershire
- OS grid reference: SP043717
- Civil parish: Alvechurch
- District: Bromsgrove
- Shire county: Worcestershire
- Region: West Midlands
- Country: England
- Sovereign state: United Kingdom
- Post town: BIRMINGHAM
- Postcode district: B48
- Dialling code: 0121
- Police: West Mercia
- Fire: Hereford and Worcester
- Ambulance: West Midlands
- UK Parliament: Bromsgrove

Rowney Green is a village in the Bromsgrove District of Worcestershire. Today the village consists of over one hundred (mostly detached) homes, a village hall, a chapel, several horse riding stables and a couple of farms. The population of Rowney Green was approximately 300 people in 2014. The area is surrounded by agricultural land, providing grazing for livestock (mostly sheep) and domestic horses.

Rowney Green is served by the Diamond Bus 182 and 183 services between Redditch and Bromsgrove, via Longbridge.

== History ==
The name 'Rowney' possibly derives from the term 'Round Hay' which is referred to in Domesday Book as are several farm buildings and dwellings in the village.

On 9 November 1943 a Wellington Bomber aircraft crashed near Rowney Green at 19.49 hours on its way back to RAF Pershore from a routine training exercise. All five crew members were killed. A memorial plaque was placed in the centre of the village in October 2007 by the Alvechurch Ex-Services Association. A Maple Tree has also been planted in recognition that all five crew members were Canadian.

According to John Corbett, Albert Edward Wheeler, who lived at 'The Ferns', purchased an ex-army hut in 1920 which served as the first village hall. It was officially called Rowney Green Peace Memorial Hall to commemorate the end of WWI but it was known as 'The Hut'. A portable stage, made up of timber planks, was purchased from disused exhibition stands at Bingley Hall. Most, if not all, of the installation work was done by the villagers themselves. The hut was transported from Alvechurch Station by Frank Satchwell using a horse and cart belonging to Edgar Quinney. A replacement hall was built in 1959 and opened in January 1960. However, during the 1990s/2000s it had fallen into disrepair. A local community group applied for and successfully obtained two rounds of funding from a National Lottery scheme. The money was used for repairs and refurbishment.

Newbourne Wood borders the village and is owned by Worcestershire Wildlife Trust. It is a small plantation woodland that was once part of a 12th-century deer park,
