= Osebury Rock =

Coordinates: 52.197°N 2.386°W

Osebury Rock (also known as Oseberrow or Rosebury) is a cliff on the River Teme near Lulsley in Worcestershire, England where fragmentary rocks of the Haffield Breccia layer are revealed. Its woodland and vegetation include some restricted varieties including the large-leaved lime and narrow-leaved bitter-cress. It was registered as a Site of Special Scientific Interest in 1990.

The place is traditionally associated with fairies and Bate's Bush was said to be haunted. Bate's Bush was a maple tree at the nearby crossroads which was said to have sprung from a stake used to impale the body of a suicide.
