= Hollybed Farm Meadows =

Nature reserve in Worcestershire, England

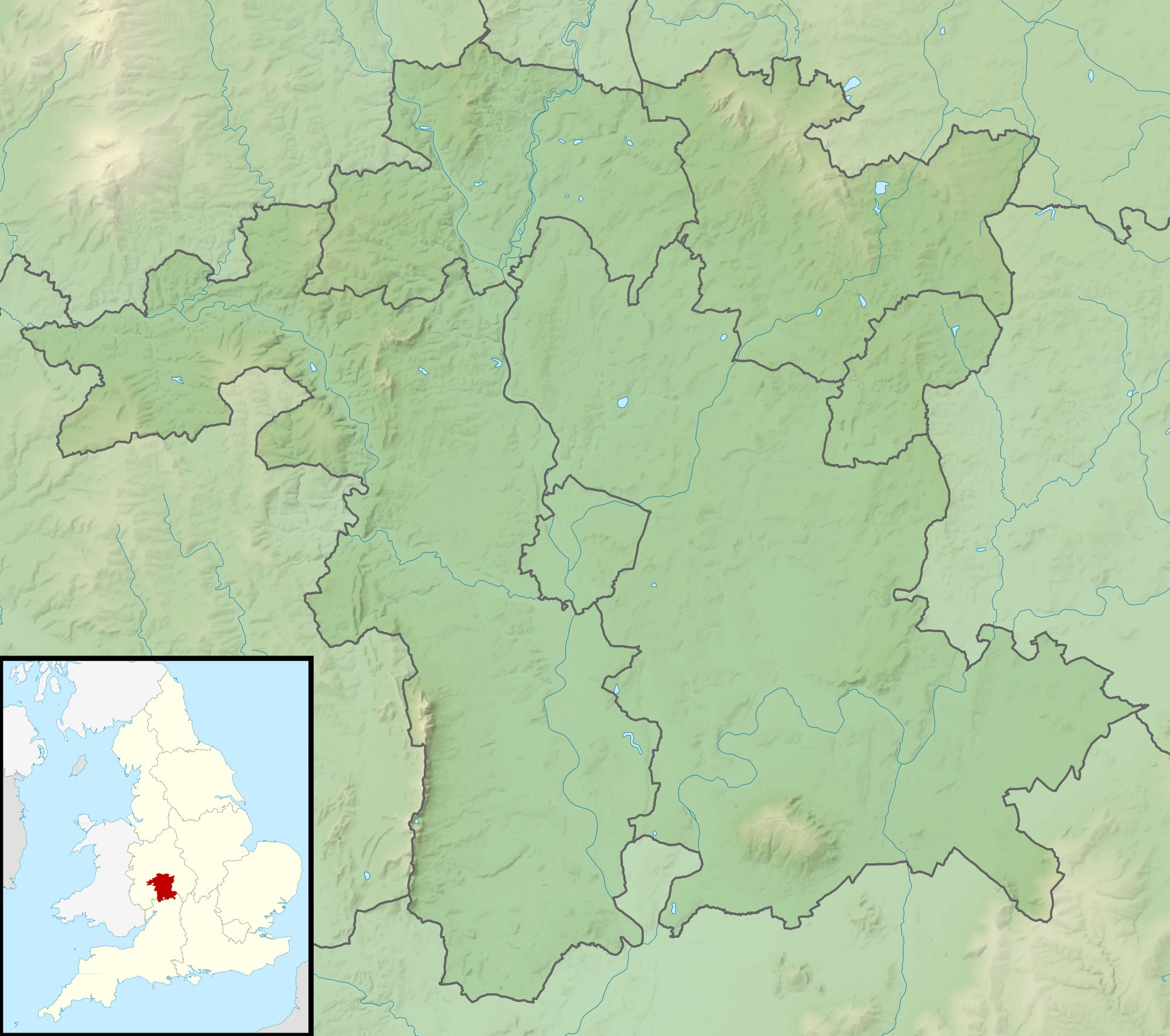
- Location within Worcestershire
- Location: near Castlemorton, Worcestershire
- OS grid: SO 780 375
- Coordinates: 52.0358°N 2.3205°W
- Area: 16 hectares (40 acres)
- Operator: Worcestershire Wildlife Trust
- Designation: Site of Special Scientific Interest
- Website: www.worcswildlifetrust.co.uk/nature-reserves/hollybed-farm-meadows

Hollybed Farm Meadows is nature reserve of the Worcestershire Wildlife Trust, about 1 mile (1.6 km) west of the village of Castlemorton, in Worcestershire, England. The habitat is grassland.

== Description ==
The site was purchased by the Trust in 2013, with help from the Esmée Fairbairn Foundation, the National Lottery Heritage Fund and members of the Trust. It is the Trust's largest meadow nature reserve, with an area of 16 hectares (40 acres).

Far Starling Bank, a meadow in the reserve, is a Site of Special Scientific Interest. It is a hay meadow, with plant species including crested dog's-tail, meadow vetchling, sweet vernal-grass and burnet saxifrage. In recent years, hay from Far Starling Bank has been strewn across the rest of the reserve, to increase the diversity of species.

Birds attracted to the meadows include green woodpecker and willow tit; many species of butterfly have been seen, such as brimstone, small tortoiseshell and comma.

An old orchard in one field, with mature pear trees, is being restored, and pear trees of a local variety have been planted here.

=== Links and biodiversity ===
The Trust believes that links between areas of countryside are beneficial for biodiversity; it notes that this reserve is one of several grasslands in the area.

=== Coronation Meadow ===
In 2013, Far Starling Bank was named Worcestershire's Coronation Meadow, part of a project led by the charity Plantlife to name a wildflower meadow in every county to celebrate 60 years since the Coronation of Elizabeth II.
