= Chaddesley Woods National Nature Reserve =

Nature reserve in Worcestershire, England

Chaddesley Woods
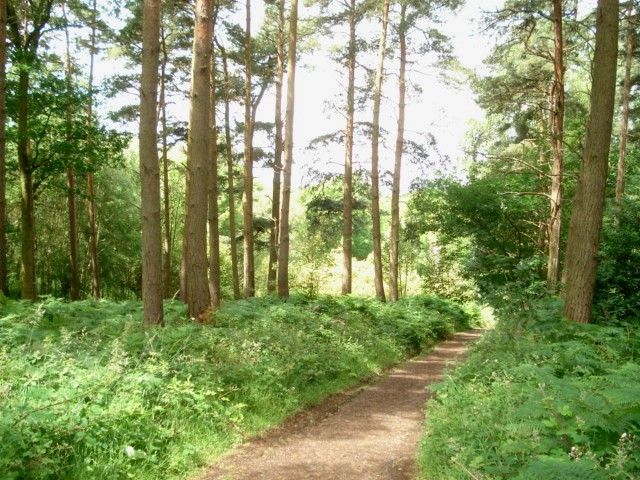

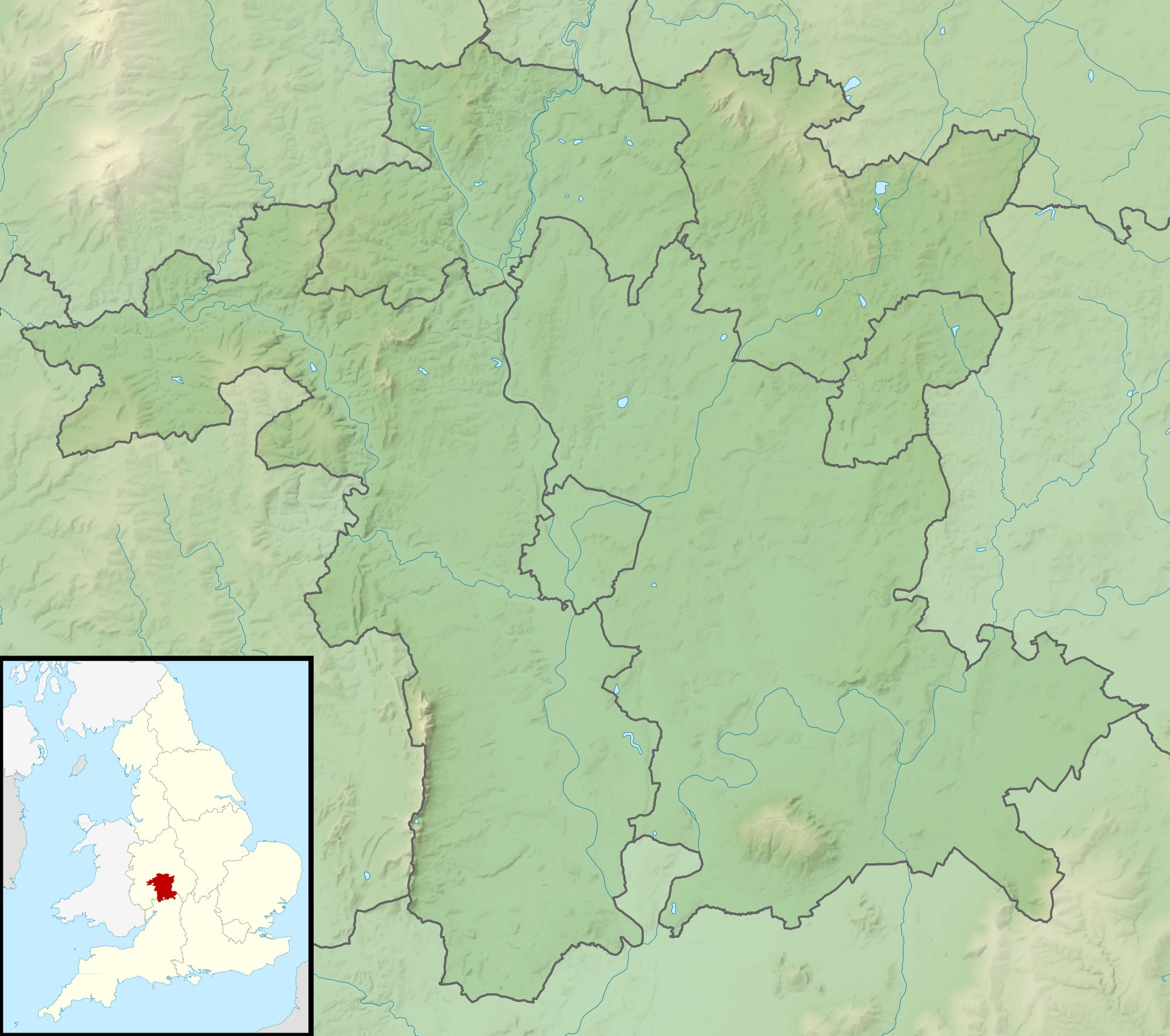
- Location within Worcestershire
- Interactive map of Chaddesley Woods
- Location: near Chaddesley Corbett
- OS grid: SO 914 737
- Coordinates: 52°21′41″N 2°7′40″W
- Area: 101 hectares (250 acres)
- Operator: Worcestershire Wildlife Trust
- Designation: National nature reserve Site of Special Scientific Interest
- Website: www.worcswildlifetrust.co.uk/nature-reserves/chaddesley-woods

Chaddesley Woods National Nature Reserve is situated near the village of Chaddesley Corbett, in Worcestershire, England. It is a reserve of the Worcestershire Wildlife Trust

== Description ==
The nature reserve is designated a Site of Special Scientific Interest. Its area is 101 hectares (250 acres), and there is a network of paths and rides, mainly on the western side.

The eastern half of the reserve is ancient woodland, being at least 400 years old; it is thought that it has been wooded since the last Ice Age, about 10,000 years ago. There is mostly oak with coppices of hazel. Some old and dead oak trees are left for hole-nesting birds, fungi and invertebrates.

The western half has large areas of planted conifers, as well as broad-leaved trees; the conifers are gradually being replaced with native hardwoods, more suited to the local geology.

The land caddis, rare in Britain, can be found in Chaddesley Woods.

There are two areas of meadow, accessible on open days: these are Hockley Meadow and Black Meadow, old pastures which are grazed to maintain the presence of wild flowers such as dyer's greenweed and pepper-saxifrage.
