= Hunthouse Wood =

Nature reserve in Worcestershire, England

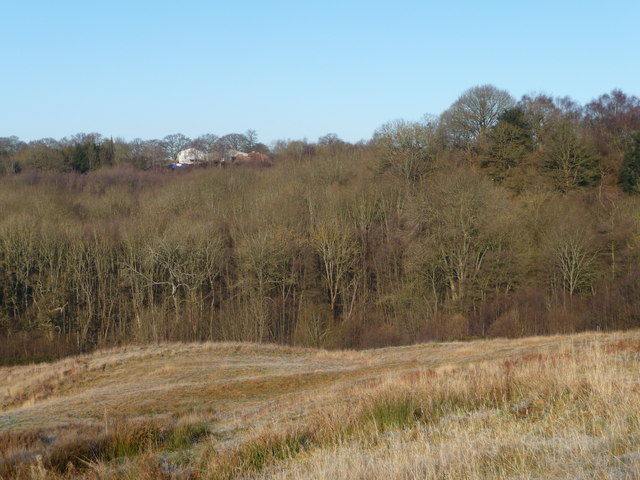
- Viewed from the east

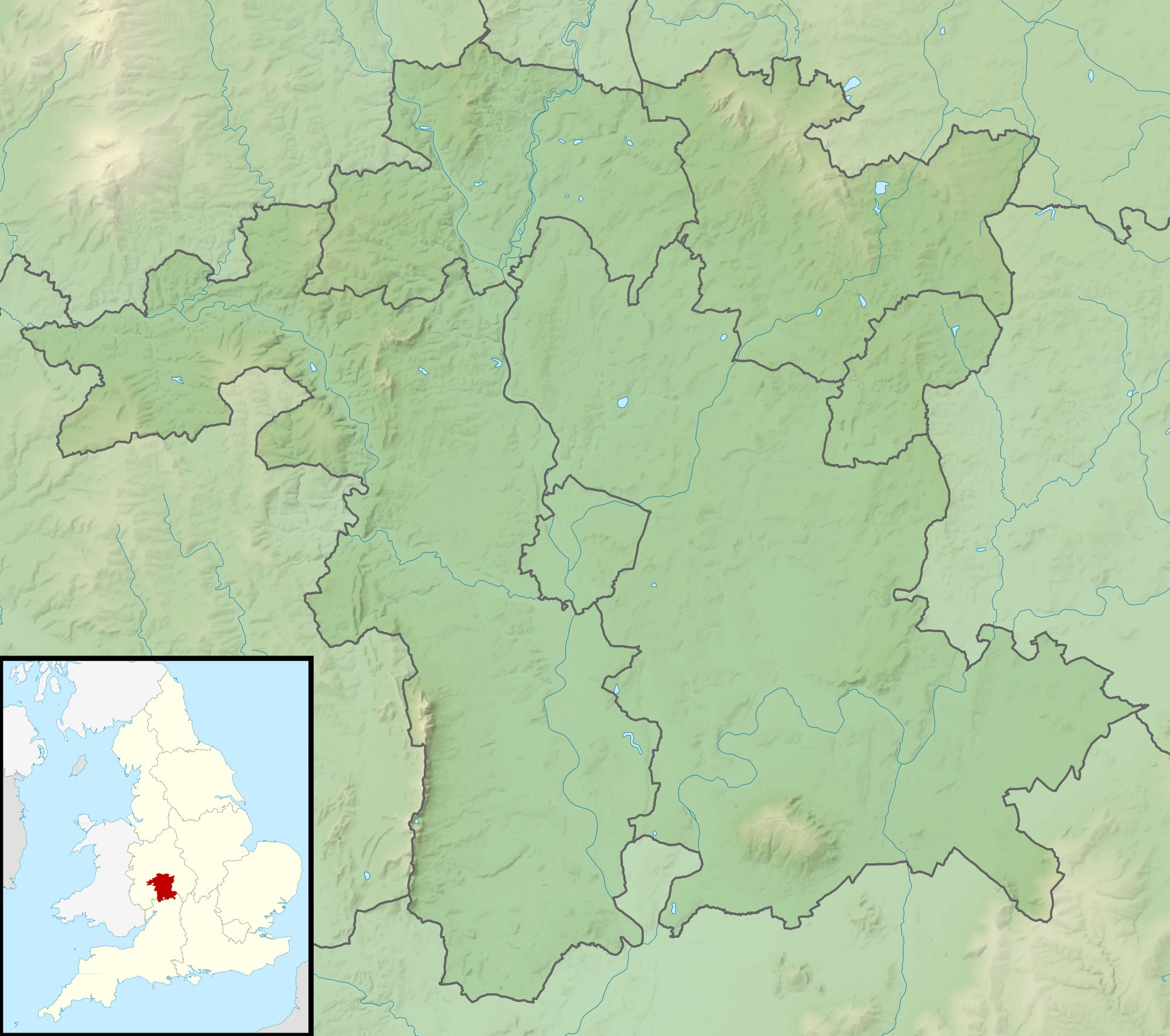
- Location within Worcestershire
- OS grid: SO 705 703
- Coordinates: 52°19′48″N 2°26′4″W
- Area: 29 hectares (72 acres)
- Operator: Worcestershire Wildlife Trust
- Designation: Site of Special Scientific Interest
- Website: www.worcswildlifetrust.co.uk/nature-reserves/hunthouse-wood

Hunthouse Wood is a nature reserve of the Worcestershire Wildlife Trust, situated near the villages of Clows Top and Mamble, in Worcestershire, England.

== Description ==
The reserve, area 29 hectares (72 acres), has been managed by the Trust since 1976; it is made up of Hunthouse, Winricks and Brockhill Woods, and it is part of the Dumbleton Dingle Site of Special Scientific Interest.

The steep-sided valley of a stream, running north–south, is within the wood; ferns and mosses are abundant near the stream. There are many tree species including oak, ash, rowan and lime. Wildlife habitats vary from open areas to undisturbed woods.

There are traces of the former tramways built by Hunthouse Colliery for transporting coal, and the sites of old engines of the colliery are visible, particularly in winter when trees are bare.
