= Tiddesley Wood – the Harry Green Reserve =

Nature reserve in Worcestershire, England

Tiddesley Wood
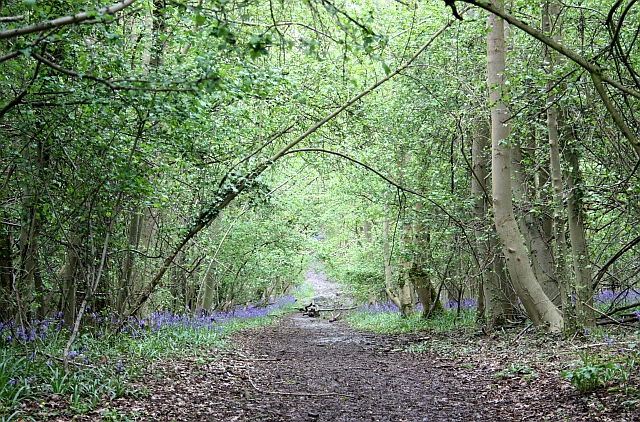
- Bluebells along a path in the wood

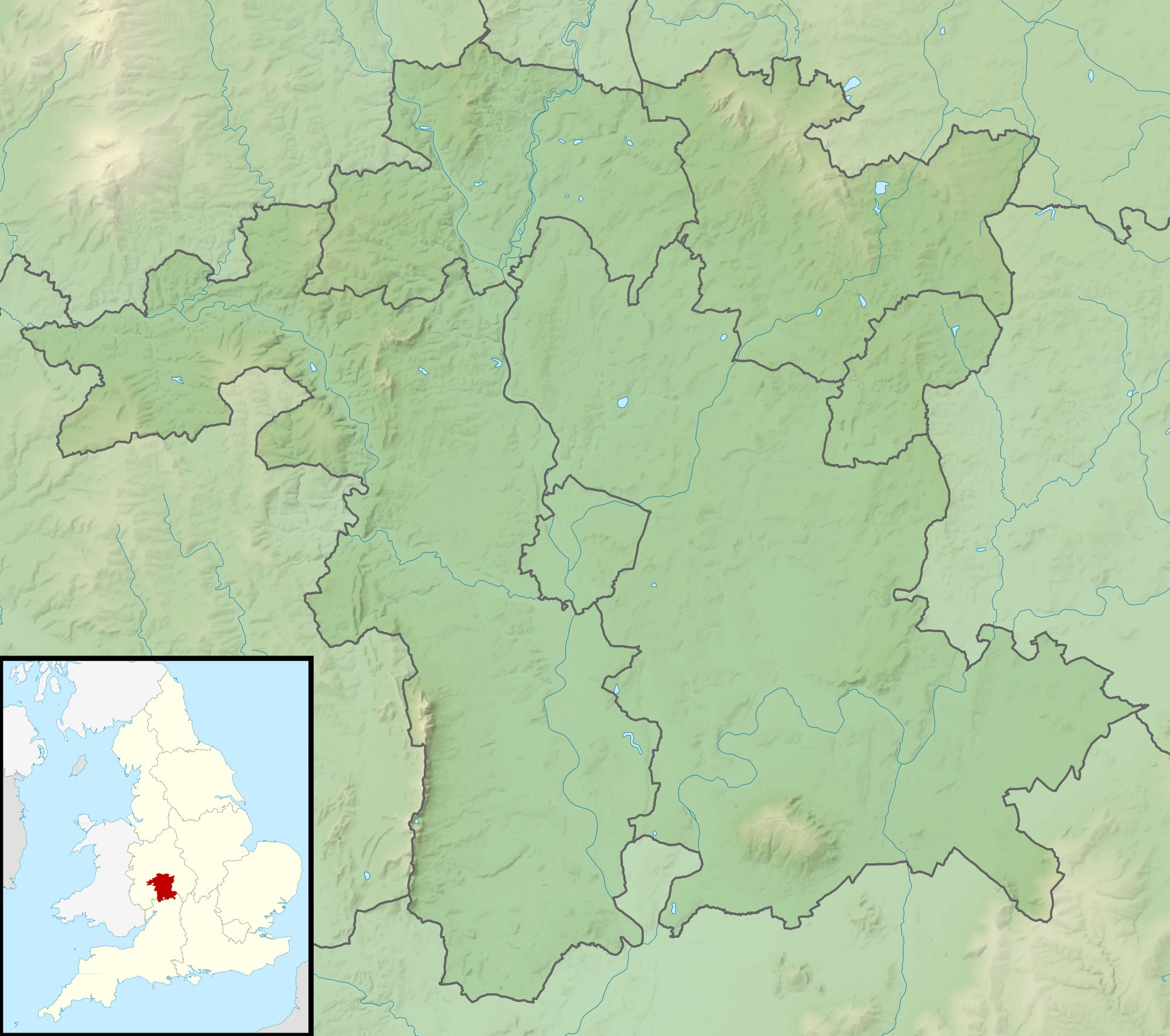
- Location within Worcestershire
- OS grid: SO 929 451
- Coordinates: 52.104°N 2.105°W
- Area: 80 hectares (200 acres)
- Operator: Worcestershire Wildlife Trust
- Designation: Site of Special Scientific Interest
- Website: www.worcswildlifetrust.co.uk/nature-reserves/tiddesley-wood-harry-green-reserve

Tiddesley Wood – the Harry Green Reserve is a nature reserve of the Worcestershire Wildlife Trust. It is situated about 1 mile west of Pershore and 7 miles south-east of Worcester, in Worcestershire, England. The reserve is an ancient woodland, and is designated a Site of Special Scientific Interest.

== Description ==
The wood, area 80 hectares (200 acres), was once owned by Pershore Abbey. In recent times it was purchased by the Trust from the Forestry Commission.

Work is done to restore ancient woodland where formerly it was managed by the Forestry Commission as a commercial plantation; the conifer plantations are being converted to broad-leaved woodland, which include oak, ash, hazel blackthorn and wild service tree.

There are different areas, each providing particular habitats for wildlife: the coppiced plots, where there are bluebells and wood anemone in spring; the areas of larger trees, where there is mature and dead wood for particular insects; and mown paths through the woodland, bordered by herbs and shrubs which are habitats for butterflies, bees and beetles.

There was a thriving market gardening industry in this part of Worcestershire in the 19th century, and the orchard at the main entrance is a remnant of this. It is now managed chiefly in terms of wildlife; in particular, decaying trees in the orchard are a habitat for noble chafer beetles, which are rare in Britain.

=== Links and biodiversity ===
The Trust believes that links between areas of countryside are beneficial for biodiversity; it notes that this reserve links the Severn and Avon Vales to the Bow Brook Project.
