= Wilden Marsh =

Nature reserve in Worcestershire, England

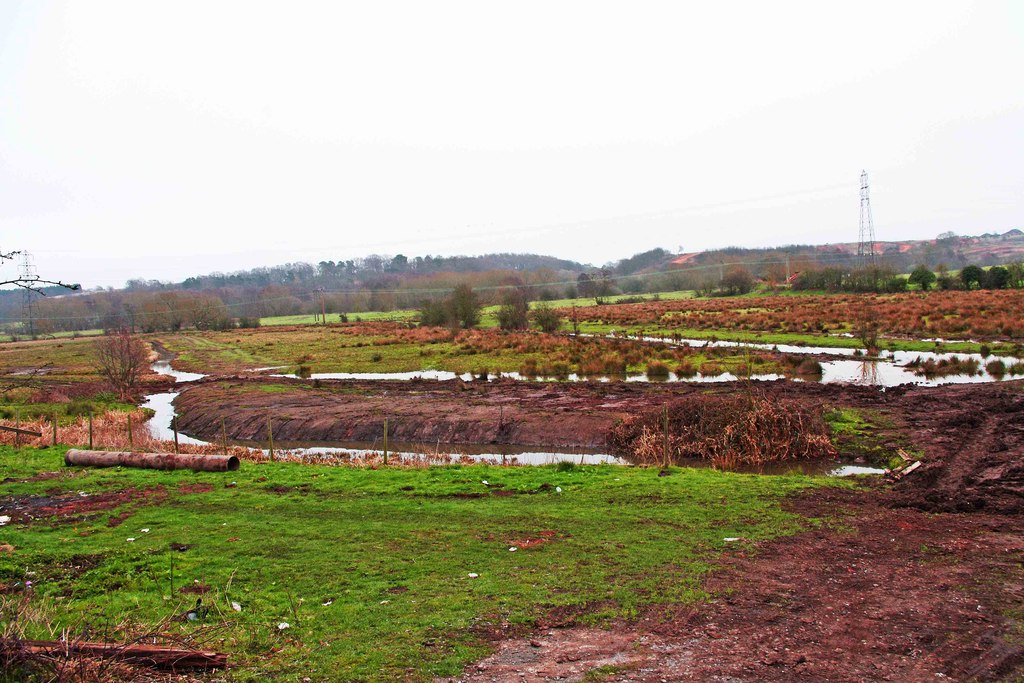
- Fields east of Oldington Bridge

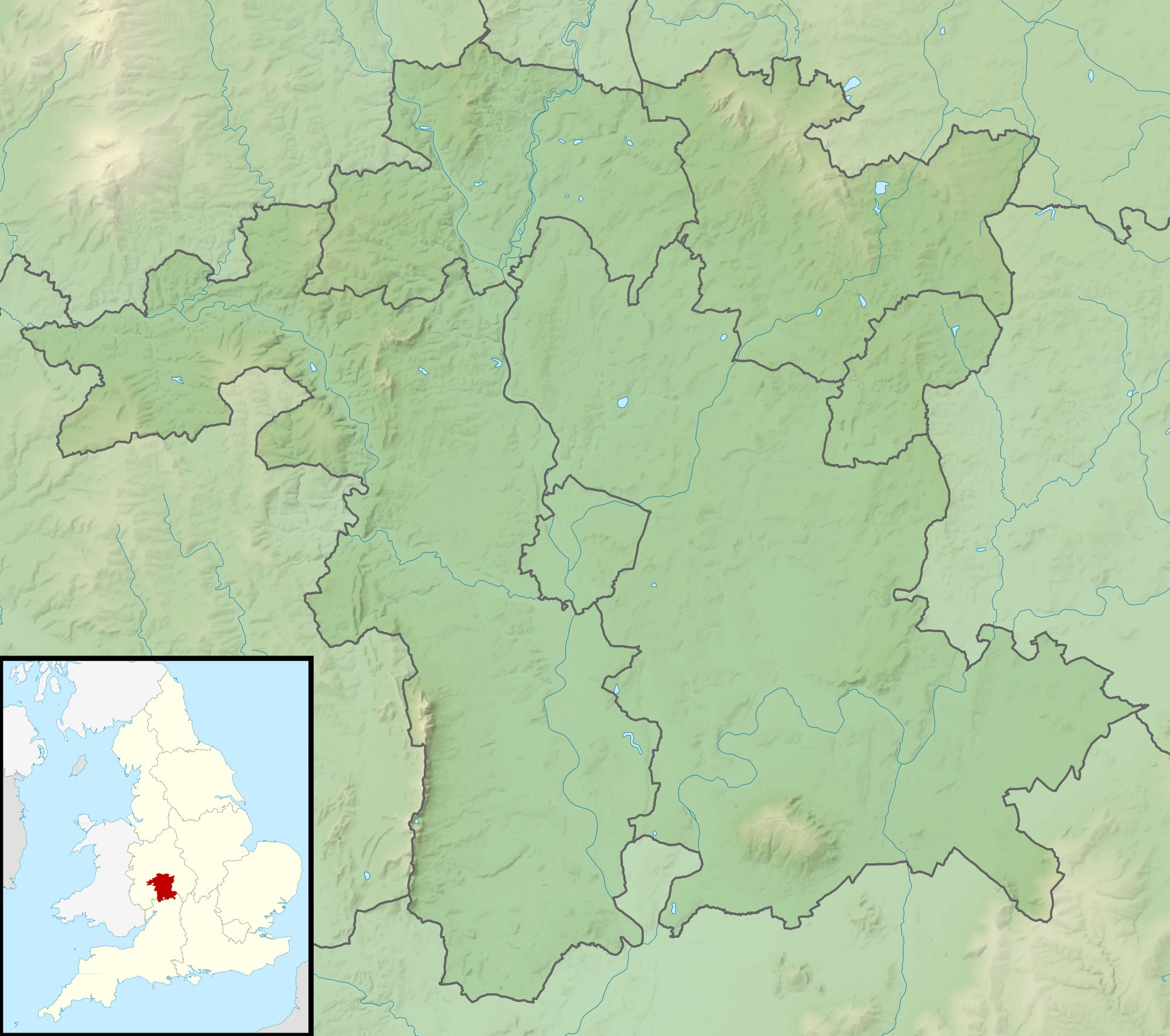
- Location within Worcestershire
- Location: Kidderminster
- OS grid: SO 827 738
- Coordinates: 52.3621°N 2.2553°W
- Area: 38 hectares (94 acres)
- Operator: Worcestershire Wildlife Trust
- Website: Wilden Marsh

Wilden Marsh is a nature reserve of the Worcestershire Wildlife Trust. It is situated between Kidderminster and Stourport-on-Severn, in Worcestershire, England, immediately east of the Staffordshire and Worcestershire Canal, and alongside the River Stour. The reserve is a Site of Special Scientific Interest.

== Description ==
The area spans 38 hectares (94 acres). The marsh is alluvial soil over clay. It links to Spennells Valley nature reserve along Hoo Brook to the north-east, which also has marshland, and to the upper Hoo Brook pools beyond; areas linked in this way by corridors are beneficial for biodiversity. Cattle are sometimes put in the marshy fields in order to keep down coarser plants. The reserve also has reed beds, dry fields, and small woods of alder and willow. Plants include marsh cinquefoil, marsh arrow-grass and marsh pennywort. Many species of bird have been recorded, including warblers, kingfishers and woodpeckers. Snipe and water rail have occasionally been seen.

== History ==
In the 1970s there was dredging of the River Stour, and a weir downstream was removed; this resulted in the marsh drying out, with an effect on plant life. Rock ramps have been put in the river to reverse this, and there has been work on sluices and drainage ditches. The situation continues to be monitored. In the 1980s it was purchased by the Worcestershire Wildlife Trust.
