= Brotheridge Green Nature Reserve =

Nature reserve in Worcestershire, England

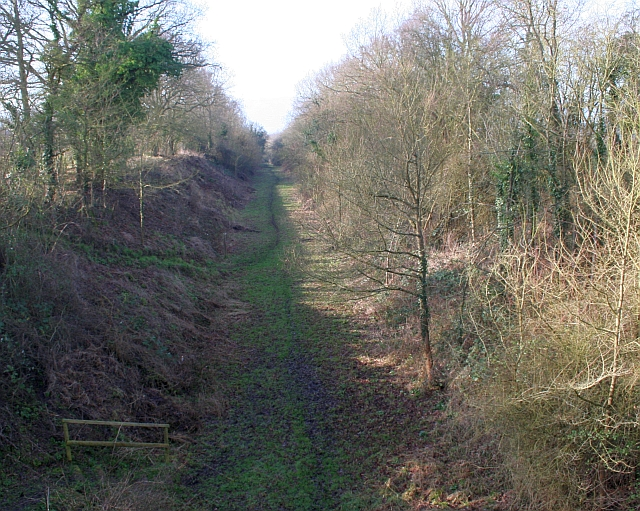
- Looking west from the road bridge

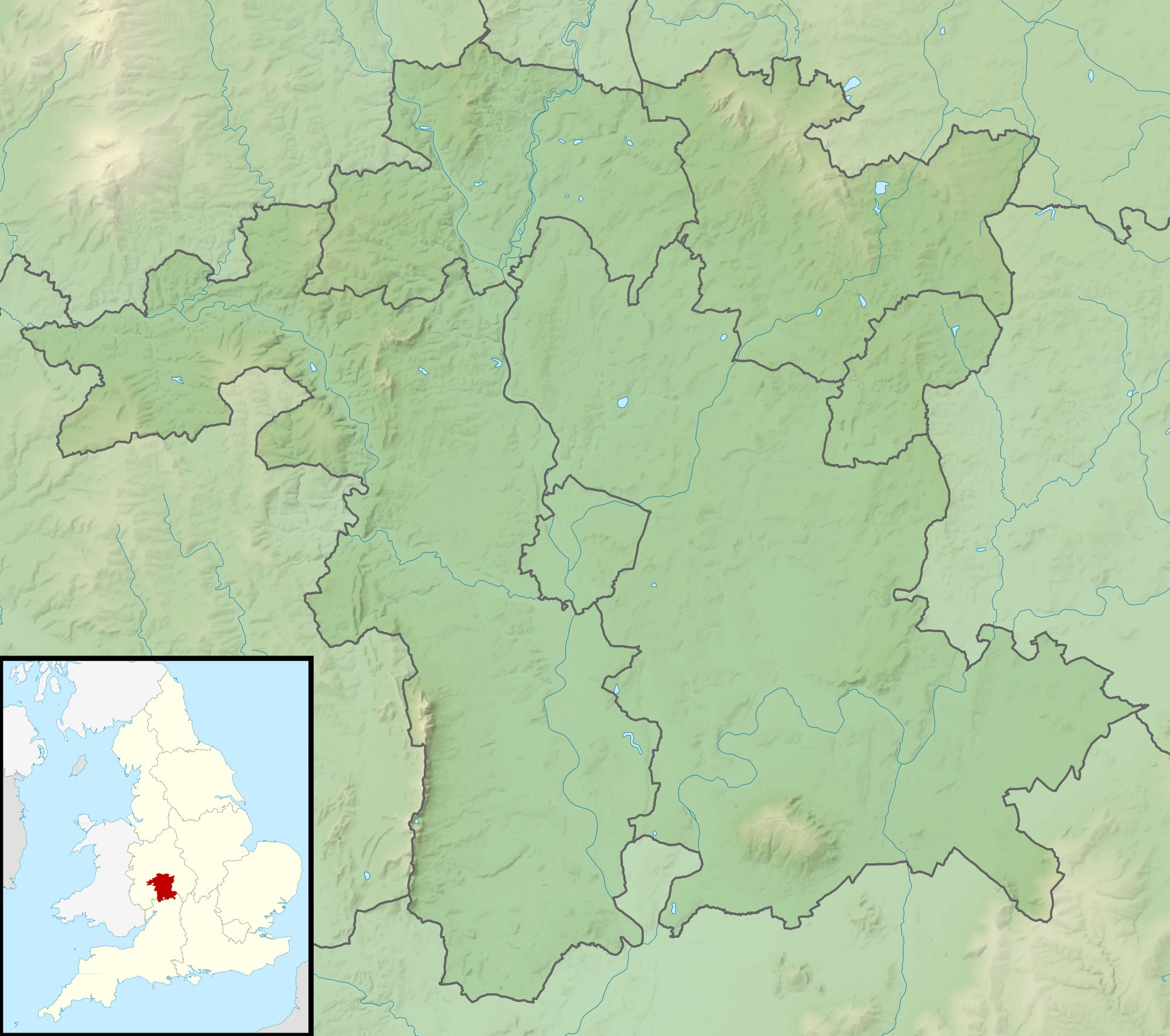
- Location within Worcestershire
- Interactive map of Brotheridge Green Nature Reserve
- Location: near Upton-upon-Severn
- OS grid: SO 816 412
- Coordinates: 52.0690°N 2.2693°W
- Area: 2 hectares (4.9 acres)
- Operator: Worcestershire Wildlife Trust
- Designation: Site of Special Scientific Interest
- Website: www.worcswildlifetrust.co.uk/nature-reserves/brotheridge-green

Brotheridge Green Nature Reserve is a nature reserve of the Worcestershire Wildlife Trust at Brotheridge Green, about 2.5 miles (4.0 km) west of Upton-upon-Severn, in Worcestershire, England. It is on a section of a former railway line.

== Description ==
The reserve, which has an area of 2 hectares (4.9 acres), is a Site of Special Scientific Interest. It is about half a mile of a section of railway line between Malvern and Upton-upon-Severn, part of the Tewkesbury and Malvern Railway. The line closed in 1952.

The eastern part of the site, near the road bridge, is a cutting where soil can remain damp; further west is an embankment, providing a different habitat with well-drained soil. The line is colonised with grassland, scrub and young trees. The site is noted for butterflies: more than 30 species have been recorded, including white-letter hairstreak, small copper and holly blue.

=== Links and biodiversity ===
The Trust believes that links between areas of countryside are beneficial for biodiversity; it notes that this reserve is one of several grasslands and one orchard in the area.
