= Ashmoor Common =

Protected area in Worcestershire, England

Coordinates: 52°6′52″N 2°12′53″W

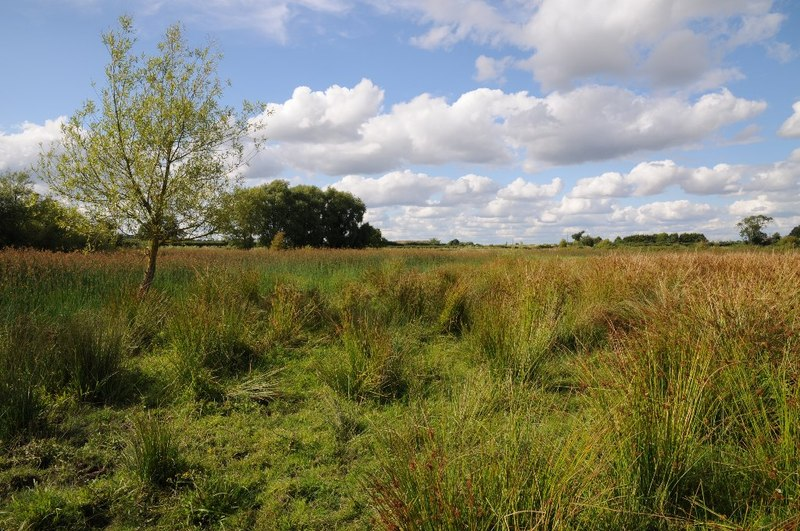
Ashmoor Common

Ashmoor Common is a Site of Special Scientific Interest (SSSI) in Worcestershire, England. It is located 2.6km south of the village of Kempsey in the valley of the River Severn. This area is protected because of its wetland plants and also because of the evidence here of changes in the course of the River Severn.

== Biology ==
Wetland plants in the marshy grassland include golden dock, tubular water-dropwort and narrow-leaved water dropwort. Marsh pennywort is also abundant. Around ditches and a pond are plant species including orange foxtail, pink water-speedwell and many-stalked spike-rush (genus Eleocharis). Bird species in this protected area include snipe and curlew.

== Geology ==
This sites contain past channels used by the River Severn. Sediment deposited in this protected area shows the chronology and progression of floodplain development.

== Land ownership and management ==
Part of the land within this protected area is registered as common land and manorial rights of this common land is held by Kempsey Parish Council. All land within Ashmoor Common SSSI is owned by the local authority.
