= Malthouse Farm Meadows =

Protected area in Worcestershire, England

Coordinates: 52.049047°N 2.2843041°W

Malthouse Farm Meadows is a Site of Special Scientific Interest (SSSI) in Worcestershire, England. It is located 1.2km southeast of the village of Welland. These hay meadows are protected because of the diversity of plant species present.

== Biology ==
Plant species in these meadows include southern marsh orchid, common spotted orchid and green winged orchid, saw-wort, devil’s-bit scabious, common milkwort and pepper saxifrage.

Bird species recorded in Malthouse Farm Meadows SSSI include curlew, snipe and lapwing.

== Land ownership ==
All land within Malthouse Farm Meadows SSSI is owned by the local authority.
