= Feckenham Forest =

Royal forest in England

Coordinates: 52.26°N 2.02°W

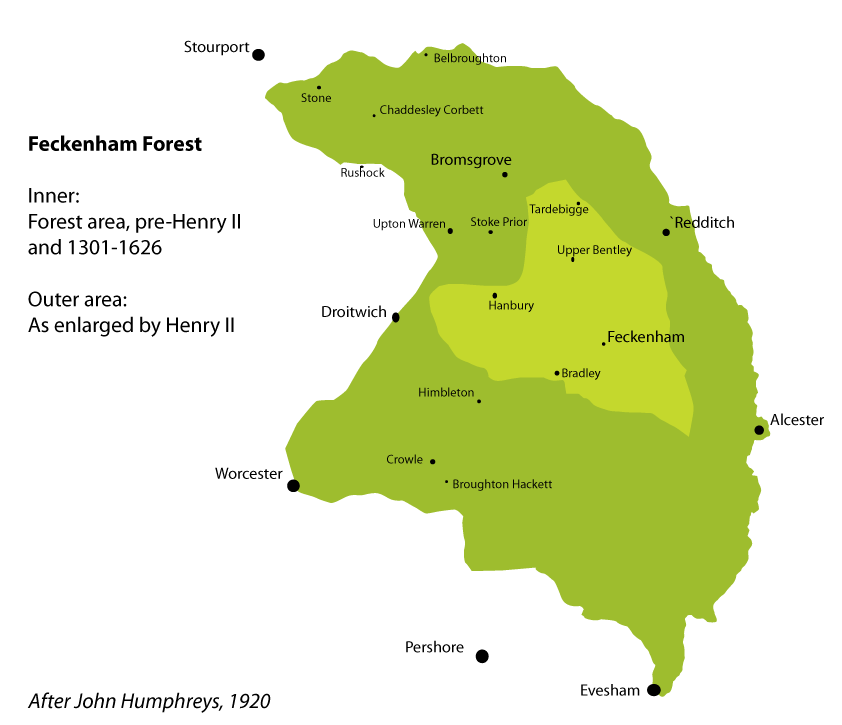
Feckenham Forest

Feckenham Forest was a royal forest, centred on the village of Feckenham, covering large parts of Worcestershire and west Warwickshire. It was not entirely wooded, nor entirely the property of the King. Rather, the King had legal rights over game, wood and grazing within the forest, and special courts imposed harsh penalties when these rights were violated. Courts and the forest gaol were located at Feckenham and executions took place at Gallows Green near Hanbury.

The legal origins are not recorded, but the area may have been used by Edward the Confessor and his predecessors for hunting. Large areas of Worcestershire were subject to forest law at the time of the Domesday Book. Forest law itself evolved greatly in the early Norman period. The forest boundaries were extended greatly during the reign of Henry II, expanding from 34 to 184 square miles. The forest boundaries were reduced back in 1301.

The wood was encroached to produce salt in Droitwich, and was quite reduced by the time it was disafforested during the reign of King Charles I in 1629. The process of disafforestation created considerable social unrest and riots. A few areas of ancient forest still remain near Dodford and Chaddesley Corbett.

The underlying geology of the forest area is mostly clay or sands and gravels. There are also peatland bogs to the south of Feckenham.

== History ==
=== The medieval forest ===
==== Extent ====
At its greatest extent, the forest covered an area including Bromsgrove, Redditch, and Evesham, reaching to the gates of Worcester. It extended across the Warwickshire boundary as far as the river Arrow, where it adjoined the Forest of Arden.

Its extent prior to Henry II was around 34 square miles (88 km^{2}), encompassing an area with Tardebigge in the north, including Hanbury, approaching Droitwich in the west and approaching Alcester in the south east.

It was extended, along with many other forests, during Henry II's reign to encompass about 184 square miles (480 km^{2}). This stretched from Evesham in the south, close to Worcester, up to Droitwich and Wychbold in the west, to Stone, Chaddesley Corbett and Alvechurch in the north, and Redditch, Studley and Alcester in the east. These boundaries are described in an official Great Perambulation made for Edward I in 1300-1, which also sets out the then extent of the forest.

The Perambulation also recommended the reduction of the royal forest to its earlier size, to include only the Parish of Feckenham, Bradley, the western part of Hanbury, parts of Stoke Prior and Bentley Pauncefoot. Foxlydiate and Headless Cross were on the northeastern boundary.

Disputes about the forest boundary continued. Edward II expanded the use of forest law in the 1320s, and areas again fell within expanded forest boundaries. Robert Burdet complained that his woodlands at Arrow had been re-afforested into Feckenham. His and other complaints were heard in at the king's Council in June 1326.

The 15th century were a period of decline of the forest courts in England, and weakness of the Crown. In 1444, Henry VI granted the Forest to Henry, Duke of Warwick to follow the male line. He died a year later without an heir.

Forest law across the country was less and less enforced during the 16th century.

==== Flora and fauna ====
The wooded areas were home to numerous species of animals including badgers, foxes, martens, otters, wild boars, wild cats and wolves. The main animals that were hunted as game were hare, red and fallow deer.

Warrens sheltered stocks of pheasant, partridge and woodcock. There were also fishponds near Feckenham and deer parks.

Wolves were a considerable problem in the Middle Ages. Hunters were paid to kill wolves in Worcestershire, at the rate of 3/- in the reign of Henry III, and Edward I specifically ordered his new chief forester Peter Corbet of Chaddesley to destroy wolves in 1280:

to take and destroy in all forests and parks and other places within our counties of Glocester, Worcester, Hereford, Salop and Stafford, in which wolves are found, the wolves, with men, dogs and his own devices in every way he thinks proper.

However, for a long time wolf populations were managed, rather than destroyed, as they were hunted for sport. Wolves were eventually eliminated in England in the reign of Henry VII.

==== Ownership and rights ====
The sporting rights pertaining to the forest belonged to the king. He had rights over hunting game, feeding pigs on acorns and beech nuts; and timber and ‘underwood’. Rights of warren were granted to Grimbald Pauncefoote in the manor of Bentley Pauncefoot in 1281 for rabbits.

Some of the manors within the forest area were owned by the Bishop of Worcester, and a few were owned by the King, such as Feckenham, Inkberrow, Bromsgrove and Chaddesley Corbett. Inkberrow had a royal deer park.

==== Governance ====
Forest law was especially harsh and a cause of considerable grievance. Governance centred on Feckenham where the courthouse and gaol were located. Executions took place at Gallows Green, between Hanbury and Droitwich on the Salt Way.

===== Officials and appointments =====
Appointments could be of considerable prestige. The forest's titular head was the keeper, whose role was essentially honorary. Prominent appointments included Geoffrey Chaucer (1389) and Gilbert Talbot of Grafton (1492). Under the keeper were verderers who were the main enforcers of forest law, investigating infractions and trespasses. Their official symbol was an axe. Woodwards guarded royal timber rights and venison.

===== Poaching and disputes =====
Poaching and encroachment on royal rights was not simply a matter of the poor taking game and, when caught, being executed. Many of the documented offences involved either noblemen or churchmen and were punished by heavy fines. The Bishop of Worcester was fined 500 marks (£333/6/8d) in 1290 for "trespasses of vert and venison" and a further £200 in 1291. Under Henry III, however, the Church of St Mary, that is Worcester Cathedral, was granted rights to hunt in their own forests, so that "no forester, verderer or other bailiffs of the King's shall in future intermeddle in the woods saving in matters touching the King's venison".

Land disputes are also recorded with the Abbots of Evesham, who enclosed a large part of the forest, when it was at its greatest extent, arguing they had the right under old charters. Their wood at Sambourne was seized in 1280 as compensation.

===== Courts =====
Records of inquisitions and the Forest Eyre in the 13th century survive in The National Archives, together with one inquisition from 1377. Some rolls of the Swanimote court of the forest from the time of Henry VII also survive.

=== Disafforestation and popular riots 1609-32 ===
There was considerable pressure on the wooded areas from the use of timber to fuel salt pans in Droitwich, a practice that had been recorded as far back as the Domesday Book. Demand for salt increased as the population grew. Much of the forest had therefore been cut, and was being farmed by the time the forest was abolished in 1629. The woodland can be seen on maps produced in this period, including that by Christopher Saxton and on the Sheldon Tapestry.

Indeed, a great deal of the land in the forest had long been cultivated. The covert of the forest consisted of the walks of Walkwood and Berrow Wood (at Berrow Hill in Feckenham), but there were few deer, because of the great flock of sheep that grazed in the forest. No less than 732 acres had been assarted out of these by 1591. however, the forest was clearly a major support for those using its lands for fuel, timber and livestock. It also provided fruit. (Note: Whyte 2013, p. 505 quotes 1638 records as stating that "a verye great nomber of fruité trees... w[i]thin the said forrest w[hi]ch... was a great nourishat [nourishment] or comfort to the poore people.")

==== Steps towards disafforestation ====
The Lord Treasurer Robert Cecil began the work of disafforestation across the Royal estate. In Feckenham, the Crown raised £1100 from the sale of 1600 trees in 1609; and in 1612 £821 from the sale of assart lands. In the following years, more wood was cut down. King James's Lord Treasurer Cranfield commissioned surveys into assart lands of various forests, including Feckenham in 1622, in order to increase revenues from the forests. This accelerated the wider policy of disafforestation.

Near the end of 1627, William Ashton and William Turnor were granted a lease of the forest in return for a fine of £4,000 and a small annual rent of £20. Ashton was a courtier, like many of the beneficiaries of the policy of disafforestation. The grant was confirmed in June 1629, when the disforestation of the forest was decreed, so that the 2100 acres (8.5 km^{2}) of woodland and waste in the forest parishes of Hanbury, Feckenham and Bradley could be partitioned between the crown, the manorial lords and the commoners.

Sir Miles Fleetwood was charged with surveying the lands before the disafforestation. The response of the inhabitants was to refuse to accept their allocation of common land, on the grounds that they had only agreed to them "for fear and by terrible threats" and that their allocations did not compensate them for the loss of common rights. Ultimately 155 of them complained to the Court of Exchequer.

A further commission in November 1630 reduced the Crown's allocation in Hanbury from 550 to 460 acres, but this was still not accepted locally. The new owners were ordered to enclose their lands by 1 March 1631.

==== Final division of the forest ====
The relative generosity of the settlement to copyholders and freeholders may reflect the poverty of the local residents. The general policy of compensating poor and tenants, says Sharp, "was a recognition of the pressing social problem that was the ultimate cause of the riots. The total sums seem quite generous, but the amount disbursed to each cottager was a mere pittance. With one hand the Crown deprived the large and growing population of poor cottagers in each forest an essential part of their income – free access to thousands of acres of waste ground – and with the other offered to them the crumbs left over from the feast consumed by the King, his farmers, and the substantial landholders in the forests".

Division of Feckenham Forest by acreage
Parish	Tenants	Poor	Crown	Total
Feckenham	700	60	140	900
Hanbury	360	100	440	900
Bradley	Share of 140	Share of 140	100	300

At Feckenham, the 60 acres to the poor was divided into plots for the poor cottagers. In Hanbury, 80 acres went to cottagers, while 20 were given to the churchwardens to provide an income to distribute to the poor. The plots granted to cottagers can be estimated to be around 1.5 acres. At Bradley, ancient cottagers were to receive 1.5 acres, and newly erected cottages 1 acre.

Evidence of the inadequacy of the settlement for the poorest residents comes from the legal challenge they made in 1630 to express dissatisfaction with the proceedings. Only 30 of the 184 complainants were entitled to compensation. The others were tenants on lands cleared without permission or subtenants who had no right of common. These residents were the main obstacle to reaching agreement on disafforestation. The area lacked important industries, so large numbers of cottagers had settled in the forest and survived by using the common.

==== Riots and suppression of the disturbances ====
On 28 March 1631, a riot took place in which three miles of fencing were thrown down. The rioting was taken highly seriously by the Privy Council, which was also disturbed by what it perceived as inaction by local militias and courts. Actions were brought against the rioters in Star Chamber in 1631. The Privy Council wrote to the Lord President of the Council of the Marches instructing him to supervise the deputy Lieutenants in Worcestershire in suppressing further "rebellious attempts". They demanded this be done by any means necessary, as the disturbances did "carry with them so dangerous a consequence".

300 people rioted in Spring 1632 and were met by the Sheriff, a Deputy Lieutenant and a Justice of the Peace with forty armed men. The rioters "in a most daring and presumptuous manner presented themselves unto us with warlike weapons (vizt) pikes, forrest bills, pitchforks, swords and the like". On this occasion, the authorities acted to suppress this "flatt [flat] rebellion", tried to arrest the rioters and injured a number of them.

These riots were part of wider disturbances including the Western Rising. Ultimately, the Crown and manorial lords were successful in enclosing their lands. The Crown allocation in Hanbury was rapidly sold off and is now known as Forest Farm. The Lord of Hanbury and Feckenham manors, Sir Edward Leighton, gained around 80 acres in Monkwood and 360 acres around Feckenham, including the Queen's Coppice, Ranger's Coppice, Timber Coppice, Fearful Coppice and Red Slough Coppice.

==== Land use after disafforestation ====
Feckenham Park was described some time after 1632 by Thomas Habingdon, and gives a picture of its transformation from forest to farmlands:

The king had a large Parke abuttinge on Feckenham thoughe in the Paryshe of Hanbury. Neither wanted theare (in Hanbury) for the recreation our Kynges a fayre Parke sortinge in name with the Kinges vast forest, reachinge in former ages far and wide.
A large walk for savage beastes, but now more commodyously chaunged into the civill habitations of many gentellmen, the freeholds of wealthy yeomen, and dwellings of industryous husbandmen. Feckenham Parke cominge by attainder to the Crown, Queen Elizabeth bestowed it on Sir Thomas Leighton, who married her neere Kynswoman Mistris Elizabeth Knolles in which family continuing towe descentes, it is devolved (by purchase) to the honourable house of the Lord Baron Coventree, Lord Keeper of the greate seale.

The manor of Feckenham was sold by Leighton to Coventry in 1632, around a year after the forest was broken up.

== Legacy ==
=== Placenames ===
Placenames which record the presence of the forest may include:

Place name	Notes
Cutpursey Coppice	May record the name of a hamlet, Cutbaldesey, absorbed in the expansion of the forest
Hewell Grange	
Huntingdrop Farm	The site of a high status medieval moated building
Foxlydiate	From Foxhuntlidgate "on the foxhunt way"
Headless Cross	From Smeethehedley
Gallow's Green	Place of forest executions, near Hanbury
Forest Farm, Hanbury	Formed from the final division of the forest. Located on Forest Road
Deer Pen, Hanbury	“where stags were penned ... to ensure sport for the monarch”.

=== Remaining woodlands and the current environmental ===
The most substantial areas are in the north west area as extended under Henry II, rather than the woodlands around Feckenham. Many are now managed by the Wildlife Trusts, who have a "Forest of Feckenham" living landscape project to restore some of the habitats:

Remaining lands	Notes
Grafton Wood	Now jointly owned by the Worcestershire Wildlife Trust and Butterfly Conservation.
Chaddesley Woods	Now designated as a Site of Special Scientific Interest.
Randan Wood	Ancient semi-natural mixed deciduous woodland near Chaddesley Woods.
Pepper Wood, Fairfield	Ancient woodland owned by the Woodland Trust (from the Forest of Pyperode and Fenny Rough) Now designated as a Site of Special Scientific Interest.
Cutpursey Coppice	An area of “Ancient semi-natural woodland”.
Pipers Hill and Dodderhill Common	Lies near the boundary of the forest, and is ancient woodland previously used in common; but there is no reference found linking it with the forest

Very little of the original woodlands are left. Biological surveys of Worcestershire show some evidence of the presence of the forest, for instance ancient trees are found in greater density in the areas of former forest.

The Forest of Feckenham area has been designated a "Biodiversity Enhancement Area" in the West Midlands Regional Spatial Strategy. This documents the area as comprising "ancient countryside with a mixed farmland mosaic of arable cultivation and temporary grass leys, ancient semi- natural woodland, old grassland, wetland, and traditional orchards". However, others claim the Hanbury Park area "is best viewed as an agriculturally despoilt part of the greater forest area. Field size is large, arable is the prevalent land use and biodiversity low."

Worcestershire County Council's documents identify that the larger area includes many "irregular fields with hedges rich in woody species indicating their origins from assarts cut into the ancient wildwood"; examples would include Astwood. Upper Bentley has a more wooded character. Part of the area near Feckenham also includes important peat wetlands. The council classifies these landscapes as 'Timbered Farmlands', 'Wooded Estatelands' and 'Wet Pasture Meadows'. The "Forest of Feckenham and Feckenham Wetlands" area is identified by the Council as a "hotspot for biodiversity" and a priority for protecting and developing 'green infrastructure' especially to protect "traditional field patterns, boundaries and small woodlands [and to] [e]nhance stream corridors".

The Forestry Commission identifies most of the former forest area as having a high potential for forestry, ("Woodland Opportunity Priority 1' or 'Priority 2') while the agricultural land quality is mediocre or poor (Grade 3 or 4 agricultural land).
