= Bat Conservation Trust =

British charity

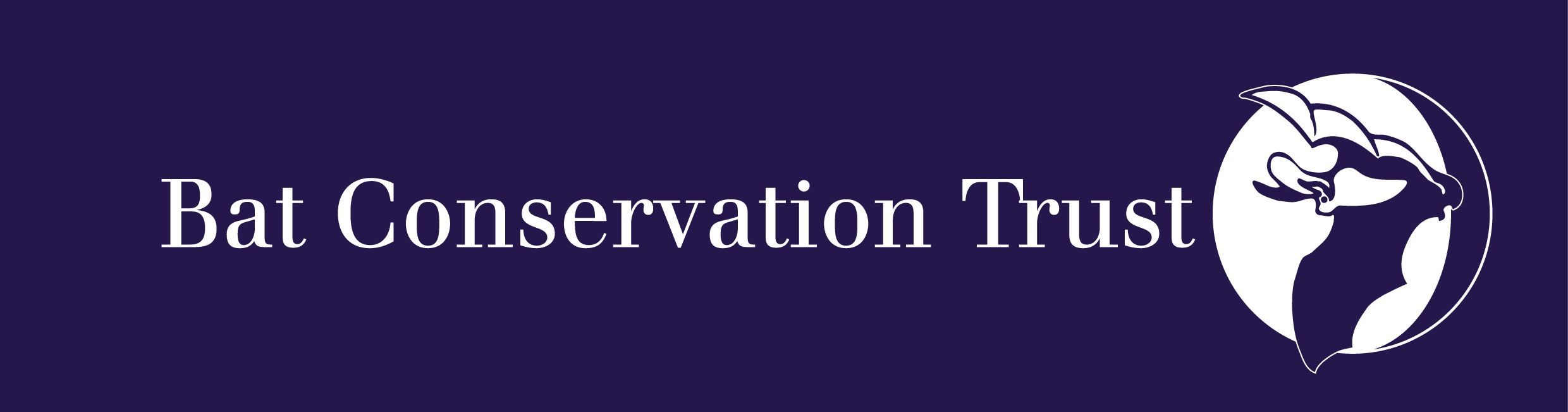
- Formation: 1991
- Type: Conservation charity
- Registration no.: England and Wales charity number 1012361; Scotland charity number SC040116)
- Headquarters: Battersea, London, United Kingdom
- Members: 4,000 (2005)
- Chief Executive: Kit Stoner
- President: Chris Packham
- Patron: David Gower
- Website: www.bats.org.uk

The Bat Conservation Trust (BCT) is a registered British charity dedicated to the conservation of bats and their habitats in the UK. BCT was founded in 1991, and is the only national organisation solely devoted to bats. Its vision is "a world rich in wildlife where bats and people thrive together". As of 2005, the trust had around 4,000 members, including individuals, families, teachers and youth workers and corporate businesses.

BCT’s work is based on four objectives, which are seen as critical to maintaining a sustainable, diverse bat population in the UK:

- To determine target population levels and associated habitats
- To secure and maintain the stated target bat population levels
- To act as the authoritative voice for bat conservation
- To win the required level of support to achieve the target number of bats.

== National Bat Helpline ==
BCT runs the National Bat Helpline, providing information to anyone – householders, members of the public, building and planning professionals – needing advice on issues relating to bats, and connecting them with local bat carers and volunteers where necessary. The helpline receives over 14,000 enquiries a year. Users can phone directly (on 0345 1300 228, with hours varying by season) or email enquiries@bats.org.uk.

== National Bat Monitoring Programme ==
The National Bat Monitoring Programme (NBMP) was launched in 1996, and consists of a number of national, annual surveys carried out by a network of volunteers across the UK. The NBMP is a partnership between Bat Conservation Trust (BCT), Joint Nature Conservation Committee (JNCC), Defra and Natural Resources Wales (NRW). Natural England (NE) also contribute to the programme.

BCT runs NBMP surveys aimed at beginners as well as experts, and their current surveys include the Sunset/Sunrise survey, Field Survey, Waterway Survey, Roost Count, Hibernation Survey, Woodland Survey and Nathusius’ Pipistrelle Survey. The results from these surveys are compiled into an annual report, available to view on the BCT website. Currently, statistically robust trends are produced for 11 of the UK’s 17 breeding species.

NBMP data support and inform conservation action and key government biodiversity monitoring and reporting, including UK and country biodiversity strategies, the Habitats Directive and the UN Eurobats agreement. NBMP data from selected species are used to produce one of the annual UK Biodiversity Indicators, high-level measures which are used to report on progress towards meeting goals and targets for the conservation of biological diversity.

== Nathusius' pipistrelle Bat Survey ==
In 2009, as part of the National Bat Monitoring Programme, BCT began the first systematic UK-wide survey of Nathusius’ pipistrelles in order to improve knowledge of the distribution of this species. Nathusius’ pipistrelle is considered to be rare in the UK but is widespread and may be under-recorded in some areas. As this species is often found at large water bodies, particularly during the autumn migration period, the survey involves surveying lakes twice during September, and making audio recordings from broadband bat detectors in order to verify Nathusius’ pipistrelle calls through sonogram analysis.

Although data gained from the survey are still quite limited, there are indications that Nathusius' pipistrelle may be relatively widespread across lakes in some regions in the autumn. From results up to 2013, Greater London showed the highest percentage of sites with analysed recordings that had verified records (83.3%), followed by the North East (69.2%), Northern Ireland (57.1%) and East of England (50%). All other regions had at least three sites with confirmed recordings of Nathusius’ pipistrelle. As of 2013, 192 volunteers have taken part and 230 sites have been surveyed. BCT encourages its members and volunteers to take part, particularly in areas where there are gaps in survey coverage, and the necessary equipment for the survey can be borrowed from their office.

== Bat Crime Investigations Project ==
Under the Wildlife and Countryside Act 1981, all UK bat species and their roosts became protected by law. Due to their low reproduction rates and long life-span, bat populations are particularly vulnerable to a range of threats, including bat-related crimes. BCT also runs a Bat Crime Investigations Project which aims to;

- Record bat-related crimes,
- Provide training and advice for the police, SNCOs and bat workers to ensure incidents are reported and investigated, and that the law is enforced with appropriate prosecutions,
- Educate the groups and sectors that perpetrate bat-related crime, and create awareness-raising initiatives such as the production of best practice guidelines to improve work practices,
- Improve areas of UK policy to reduce opportunities for ignoring the legislative protection given to bats.

The Bat Crime Investigations Project also aims to uphold the protection for bats as detailed in the Wildlife and Countryside Act 1981, which criminalised the following;

- Deliberately capturing, injuring or killing a bat,
- Intentionally or recklessly disturbing a bat in its roost or deliberately disturbing a group of bats,
- Damaging or destroying a bat's roosting place (even if bats are not occupying the roost at the time),
- Possessing or advertising/selling/exchanging a bat (dead or alive) or any part of a bat,
- Intentionally or recklessly obstructing access to a bat roost.

== Magazines ==
BCT produces two members-only magazines, published three times a year: Bat News and The Young Batworker.

First published in September 1984,., Bat News contains news, research updates and other features on the work of BCT, its member groups and researchers around the world.

The Young Batworker is BCT's magazine for family members and their Young Batworkers’ Club. It features bat-themed activities, games, stories, competitions and curriculum guidance for teachers.

BCT also produce advice leaflets and other publications for members and the public on topics such as UK bat species, living with bats and gardening for bats.

The BCT's email bulletin includes current news stories relating to the organisation and general bat conservation. It has a readership of around 10,000.

== Bat groups ==
BCT provides support for over 80 bat groups across the UK. Made up of dedicated volunteers, they vary in size from a few individuals to hundreds of members. Bat groups organise and carry out frontline conservation. The activities each group undertakes will vary but include surveys and monitoring projects, leading bat walks and giving talks, research studies, bat care and rehabilitation. Individual groups fundraise locally for their group and for BCT.

== Events and training ==
BCT organises the National Bat Conference, held annually, at a different university venue, each September. The conference programme begins with a bat walk on Friday evening, followed by talks and workshops across the weekend. The BCT AGM is also held on the Saturday.

Five smaller English regional conferences are held in spring over a three-year cycle, and there are separate events for Scotland and Wales.

BCT runs a mixture of online and in-person training courses throughout the year for volunteers and professionals.

Each October, during Bat Appreciation Month, BCT presents BatFest, a series of online events and activities celebrating bats in the lead up to Halloween.

== Awards ==
Awards are presented at the National Bat Conference.

=== The Vincent Weir Award ===
The Vincent Weir scientific award was first presented at the National Bat Conference in 2010, in honour of the late Vincent Weir. The award is presented annually to a student at a UK-based institution who has made a significant contribution to research on the conservation biology of bats.

=== The Pete Guest award ===
The Pete Guest award was first presented in 2004, replacing the “Outstanding voluntary contribution to bat conservation” award set up in 2002. The award is for individuals who have made an outstanding practical contribution to bat conservation.

=== Kate Barlow Award ===
Awarded between 2017 and 2025, in honour of the late Dr Kate Barlow, a wildlife conservationist who directed BCT's National Bat Monitoring Programme for six years. The award took the form of a grant to cover a substantial portion of a postgraduate student's research costs for a study benefitting bat conservation.
