= Worcestershire Wildlife Trust =

Nature conservancy organization in Worcestershire, England

Worcestershire Wildlife Trust is one of 46 wildlife trusts throughout the United Kingdom, part of The Wildlife Trusts partnership, the UK's largest charity network dedicated to conserving all our habitats and species. It was founded in 1968 to conserve, protect and restore Worcestershire's wildlife.

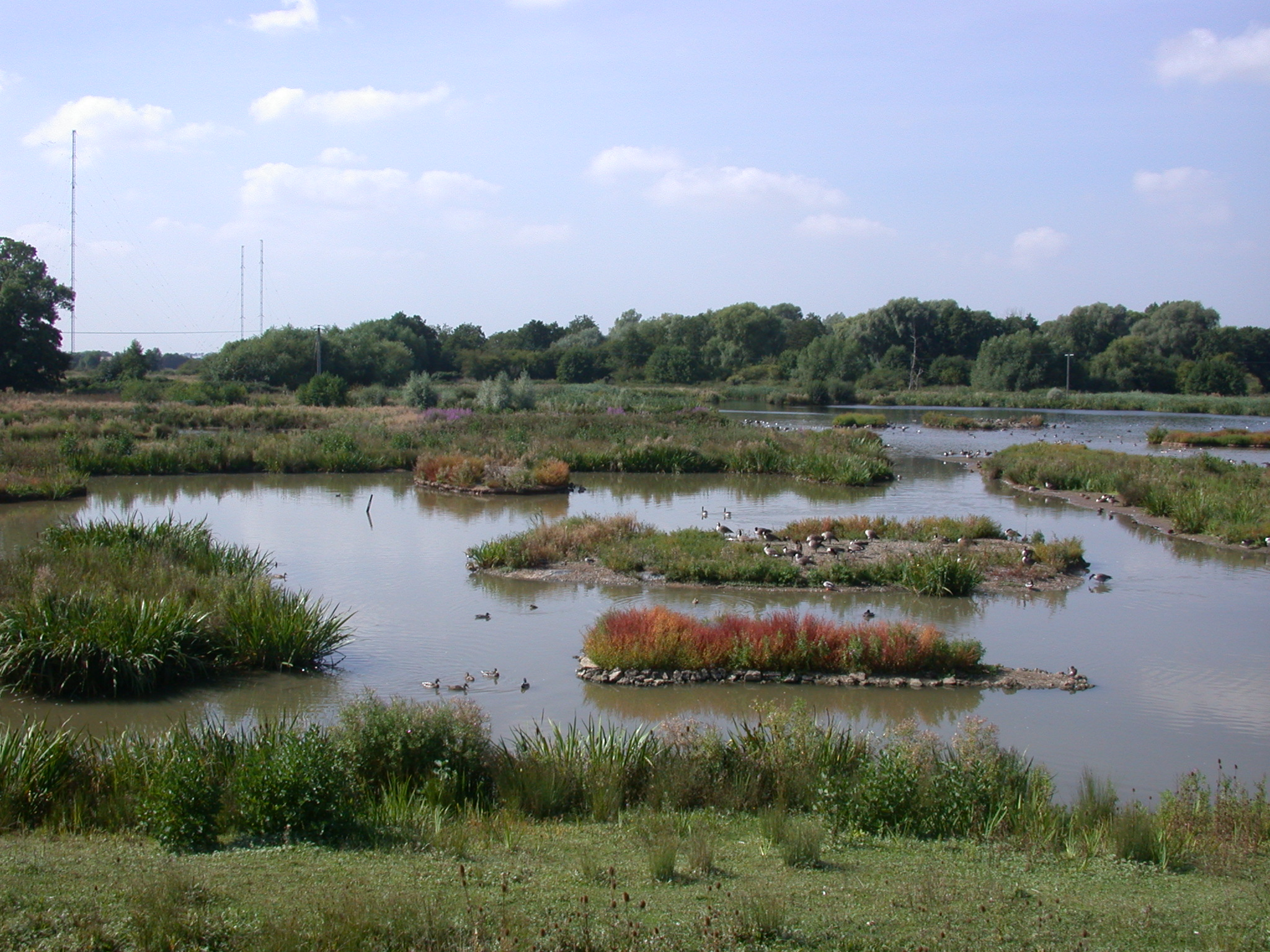
Christopher Cadbury Wetland Reserve at Upton Warren

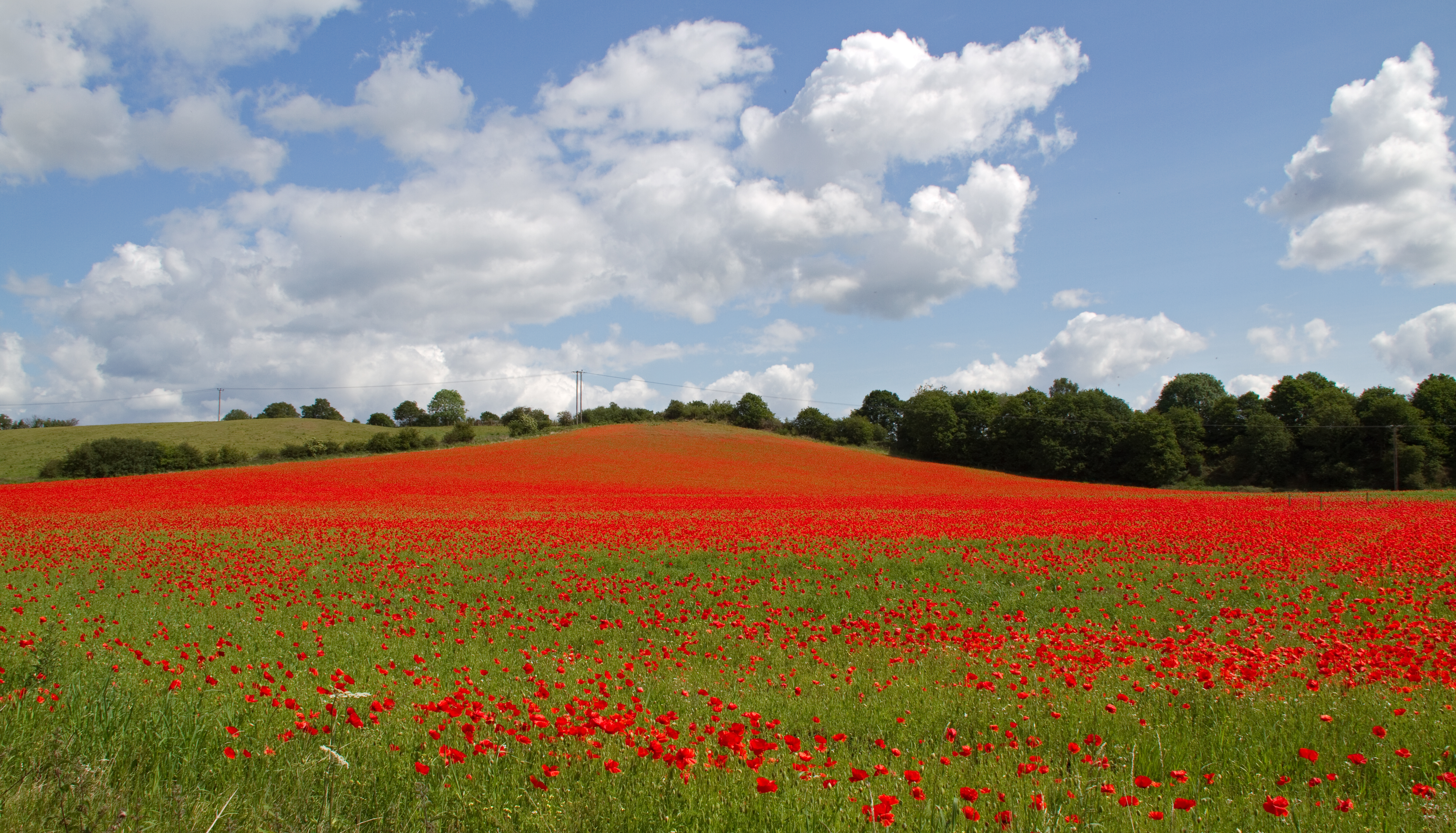
Corn poppy dominated fallow field at Bewdley, part of the Devil's Spittleful & Rifle Range and Blackstone Farm Fields Nature Reserve

The trust owns and manages over 70 nature reserves across the county, totalling about 2000 acres (8 km^{2}), part of their vision for a "Living Landscape for Worcestershire". The trust has nearly 20,000 members and more than 350 volunteers.

== List of reserves ==
Reserves include:

- Brotheridge Green Nature Reserve
- Chaddesley Woods NNR
- Christopher Cadbury Wetland Reserve (popularly called "Upton Warren")
- The Devil's Spittleful and Blackstone Farm Fields, which includes the Devil's Spittleful and is adjacent to Wyre Forest District Council's Rifle Range Nature Reserve.
- Feckenham Wylde Moor
- Fosters Green Meadows NNR
- Grafton Wood
- Hollybed Farm Meadows
- Hunthouse Wood
- Knapp and Papermill
- Laight Rough
- Lower Smite Farm
- Monkwood
- Newbourne Wood
- Piper's Hill & Dodderhill Common (known locally as Hanbury Woods)
- Trench Wood
- Tiddesley Wood
- Wilden Marsh
