= List of places in Worcestershire =

Some of the larger settlements of Worcestershire.

This is a list of cities, towns and villages in the ceremonial county of Worcestershire, England.

For places formerly in Worcestershire, and transferred to other counties between 1844 and 1974, see List of Worcestershire boundary changes.

== A ==
- Ab Lench, Abberley, Abberton, Abbots Morton, Aggborough, Aldington, Alfred's Well, Alfrick, Alfrick Pound, Alvechurch, Ankerdine Hill, Apes Dale, Areley Kings, Arrowfield Top, Ashton-under-Hill, Astley, Astley Burf, Astley Cross, Aston Bank, Aston Fields, Aston Somerville, Astwood Bank, Atch Lench

== B ==
- Badgers Hill, Badsey, Bank's Green, Bank Street, Barbourne, Barnards Green, Barnt Green, Barnettbrook, Bastonford, Batchley, Baughton, Bateman's Green, Baughton, Baylis Green, Baynhall, Bayton, Bayton Common, Beach Hay, Beckford, Belbroughton, Bell End, Bell Heath, Bellevue, Bengeworth, Bentley, Beoley, Berrington, Berrington Green, Berrow, Berrow Green, Berry Hill, Besford, Besford Bridge, Besford Court, Bevere, Bewdley, Bickley, Birch Acre, Birch Berrow, Birchen Coppice, Birlingham, Birts Street, Birtsmorton, Bishampton, Bittell Reservoir, Blackminster, Blackmore End, Blackpole, Blackstone, Blackwell, Blakebrook, Blakedown, Blakeshall, Bliss Gate, Bluntington, Bockleton, Boreley, Bournes Green, Bournheath, Bouts, Bow Brook, Bowling Green, Bradley Green, Bransford, Branson's Cross, Bredicot, Bredon, Bredon's Hardwick, Bredons Norton, Bretford, Bretforton, Brickfields, Bricklehampton, Bridge End, Broad Alley, Broad Common, Broad Green, Brayswick, Broad Marston, Broadmore Green, Broadwas, Broadwater Down, Broadway, Brockamin, Brockencote, Bromsgrove, Brook End, Broom, Broome, Broombank, Broom Hill, Brotheridge Green, Broughton Green, Broughton Hackett, Brownheath Common, Bryan's Green, Buckbury, Buckridge, Bugle Gate, Burcot, Burlish Park, Bury End, Bushley, Bushley Green

== C ==
- Cakebole, Callow End, Callow Hill, Callow Hill, Camers Green, Carpenter's Hill, Castle Hill, Castlemorton, Catchems End, Catshill, Caunsall, Chadbury, Chaddesley Corbett, Chadwick, Chandler's Cross, Charford, Charlton, Chatley, Chawson, Cherry Orchard, Childs Wickham, Church End, Church Lench, Churchill (near Worcester), Churchill(near Kidderminster), Cladswell, Claines, Cleeve Prior, Clent, Clevelode, Clifton, Clifton-upon-Teme, Clows Top, Cobley Hill, Cofton Hackett, Coles Green, Collett's Green, Collins Green, Comhampton, Conderton, Cookhill, Cookley, Cooksey Green, Copcut, Cow Honeybourne, Cotheridge, Crabbs Cross, Cropthorne, Cross Bank, Crossway Green, Crowcroft, Crowle, Crowle Green, Crown East, Cruise Hill, Cutnail Green

== D ==
- Dagtail End, Darbys Green, Dawshill, Dayshouse Bank, Deblin's Green, Defford, Diglis, Dines Green, Doddenham, Dodderhill, Dodford, Dordale, Dormston, Doverdale, Dowles, Dowles Brook, Drakelow, Drakes Broughton, Drakes Cross, Draycott, Drayton, Droitwich Spa, Druggers End, Duckswich, Dunhampstead, Dunhampton, Dunley, Dunstall Common

== E ==
- Eachway, Eardiston, Earls Common, Earls Croome, Eastham, Eckington, Edgiock, Egdon, Elcock's Brook, Eldersfield, Elmbridge, Elmley Castle, Elmley Lovett, Elms Green, Enfield, Evesham

== F ==
- Fairfield, Far Forest, Feckenham, Fernhill Heath, Fingerpost, Finstall, Fladbury, Fladbury Cross, Flyford Flavell, Foley Park, Footrid, Forhill, Foster's Green, Four Pools, Foxlydiate, Franche, Frankley, Frankley Green, Frankley Hill, Frith Common, Frog Pool

== G ==
- Gilbert's Coombe, Gilver's Lane, Good's Green, Goom's Hill, Goosehill Green, Gorst Hill, Grafton, Grafton Flyford, Great Comberton, Great Dodford, Great Malvern, Great Witley, Greenhill, Greenlands, Green Lane, Green Street, Greenway, Greystones, Grimley, Grimes Hill, Grimley, Guarlford, Guller's End

== H ==
- Habberley, Hackman's Gate, Hadley, Hadzor, Hagley, Hales Park, Hall Flat, Hallow, Hallow Heath, Ham Green, Hampton, Hampton Lovett, Hanbury, Hanley Castle, Hanley Child, Hanley Swan, Hanley William, Harbours Hill, Hardwick Green, Harpley, Hartle, Hartlebury, Hartlebury Common, Harvington, Hatfield, Hawbridge, Hawford, Headless Cross, Headley Heath, Heath Green, Heightington, Henbrook, Henwick, High Green, Highwood, Hill Croome, Hill End, Hill Furze, Hillhampton, Hillpool, Hill Side, Himbleton, Hindlip, Hinton Cross, Hinton-on-the-Green, Hoden, Holbeache, Holberrow Green, Holdfast, Holly Green, Hollybush, Hollywood, Holt, Holt End, Holt Fleet, Holt Heath, Holy Cross, Honeybourne, Hoobrook, Hook Bank, Hopwood, Horsham, Howsen, Huddington, Hunnington, Hunt End, Hurcott

== I ==
- Illey, Inkberrow, Inkford, Interfield, Ipsley

== K ==
- Kemerton, Kempsey, Kendal End, Kenswick, Kersoe, Kerswell Green, Kidderminster, King's End, King's Green, Kingsford, Kingswood Common, Kington, Knighton-on-Teme, Kinnersley, Knightwick, Knowle Fields, Kyre, Kyre Green, Kyre Park, Kyrewood

== L ==
- Ladywood, Lakeside, Laughern Hill, Leadon, Lea End, Leapgate, Leigh, Leigh Brook, Leigh Sinton, Lem Hill, Lenchwick, Libbery, Lickey, Licky End, Lickhill, Lincomb, Lindridge, Lineholt, Lineholt Common, Linkend, Linthurst, Little Beckford, Little Comberton, Little Eastbury, Little Inkberrow, Little London, Little Malvern, Little Witley, Littleworth, Lodge Park, Long Bank, Long Green, Longdon, Longdon Heath, Longdon Hill End, Longley Green, Longbridge, Longdon, Low Habberley, Lower Bentley, Lower Broadheath, Lower Clent, Lower Howsell, Lower Illey, Lower Moor, Lower Sapey, Lower Strensham, Lower Town, Lower Westmancote, Lower Wick, Lower Wolverton, Lulsley, Lydiate Ash, Lye, Lye Head

== M ==
- Madeley Heath, Madresfield, Major's Green, Malvern, Malvern Common, Malvern Link, Malvern Hills, Malvern Wells, Mamble, Marlbrook, Marsh End, Martin Hussingtree, Martley, Matchborough, Menithwood, Mere Green, Middle Littleton, Monkwood Green, Moons Moat, Moor End, Morton Spirt, Mount Pleasant, Murcot, Mustow Green

== N ==
- Napleton, Nash End, Naunton, Naunton Beauchamp, Neight Hill, Netherton, New End, Newbridge Green, Newland, Newland Common, Newnham, Newnham Bridge, Nineveh, Norchard, Noah's Green, Norchard, North Littleton, North Malvern, North Piddle, Northwick, Norton, Norton, Noutard's Green

== O ==
- Oakall Green, Ockeridge, Oddingley, Offenham, Offenham Cross, Old Hills, Old Storridge Common, Oldfield, Oldwood, Ombersley, Orleton, Overbury

== P ==
- Park End, Park Gate, Pebworth, Pedmore, Pendock, Pensax, Pensham, Peopleton, Perryfields, Pershore, Phepson, Pin's Green, Pink Green, Pinstones, Pinvin, Piper's End, Piper's Hill, Pirton, Pixham, Podmoor, Pole Elm, Poolbrook, Pound Bank, Pound Bank, Powick, Primsland

== Q ==
- Queenhill

== R ==
- Radford, Rainbow Hill, Ramsden, Rashwood, Redcross, Redditch, Rhydd, Rhydd Green, Ribbesford, Ripple, Riverside, Rochford, Rock, Romsley, Romsley Hill, Ronkswood, Ross Green, Rous Lench, Rowney Green, Rubery, Rumbow Cottages, Rushock, Rushwick, Ryall, Rye Cross, Rye Street

== S ==
- Saleway, Salwarpe, Sandford, Sankyns Green, Sedgeberrow, Severn Stoke, Sharpway Gate, Shatterford, Shell, Shelsley Beauchamp, Shelsley Walsh, Shenstone, Sheriff's Lench, Shernal Green, Sherrardspark, Shoulton, Shrawley, Sidemoor, Silver Street, Slideslow, Sinton, Sinton Green, Slades Green, Sledge Green, Smallwood, Smite Hill, Smith End Green, Sneachill, Snead Common, Sneads Green, South Littleton, Spennells, Spetchley, St. Godwalds, St. Johns, St. Michaels, St. Peter the Great, Southcrest, Southwood, Stakenbridge, Stanbrook, Stanford Bridge, Stanford-on-Teme, Stanklyn, Staple Hill, Stitchin's Hill, Stock Green, Stock Wood, Stockton-on-Teme, Stoke Bliss, Stoke Heath, Stoke Pound, Stoke Prior, Stoke Wharf, Stone, Stonebow, Stonehall, Stonepits, Stoney Hill, Stoulton, Stourbridge, Stourport-on-Severn, Strensham, Structon's Heath, Suckley, Suckley Green, Suckley Knowl, Summerfield, Summerhill, Sytchampton

== T ==
- Tanner's Green, Tanwood, Tardebigge, Tenbury Wells, The Bourne, The Burf, The Grove, The Gutter, The Hook, The Hyde, The Lakes, The Rampings, The Walshes, Throckmorton, Tibberton, Timberhonger, Titton, Tolladine, Torto, Trimpley, Trotshill, Trueman's Heath, Tunnel Hill, Tutnall,

== U ==
- Uckinghall, Upper Arley, Upper Bentley, Upper Broadheath, Upper Broadhead, Upper Catshill, Upper Gambolds, Upper Ham, Upper Haselor, Upper Howsell, Upper Moor, Upper Rotchford, Upper Strensham, Upper Welland, Upper Wick, Upper Wolverton, Upton Snodsbury, Upton St. Leonards, Upton-upon-Severn, Upton Warren

== W ==
- Wadborough, Walcot, Walton Pool, Waresley, Warndon, Weatheroak Hill, Webheath, Welland, Welland Stone, West End, West Hagley, West Malvern, Westlands, Westmancote, Weston-sub-Edge, Westwood, White End, White Ladies Aston, Whittington, Wichenford, Wick, Wick Episcopi, Wickhamford, Wilden, Wildmoor, Willow Green, Winnall, Winyates, Winyates Green, Withybed Green, Witnells End, Witton, Witton Hill, Wollaston, Wolverley, Wood Green, Wood Norton, Woodcote Green, Woodgate, Woodgates Green, Woodmancote, Woodrow, Woodrow, Woodsfield, Woolmere Green, Worcester, Worms Ash, Wribbenhall, Wychavon, Wychbold, Wyre Forest, Wyre Piddle, Wythall

== See also ==
- List of settlements in Worcestershire by population
- Category:Populated places in Worcestershire
- Category:Worcestershire-related lists
- List of places in England
