= Havergal =

Havergal may refer to:

== People ==
=== Given name ===
- Havergal Brian (1876–1972), British classical composer

=== Surname ===
- Beatrix Havergal (1901–1980), English horticulturist
- Frances Ridley Havergal (1836–1879), English religious poet and hymnwriter
- Francis Tebbs Havergal (1829–1890), English author and editor
- Giles Havergal (1938–2025), Scottish theatre director and actor
- Henry East Havergal (1820–1875) English clergyman and organist
- William Henry Havergal (1793–1870), English clergyman, writer, composer and hymnwriter

== Geography ==
- Mont Havergal, a mountain in Kerguelen, French Southern and Antarctic Lands

== Schools ==
- Havergal College, school for girls Toronto, Canada
