= Bow Brook =

River in Worcestershire, England

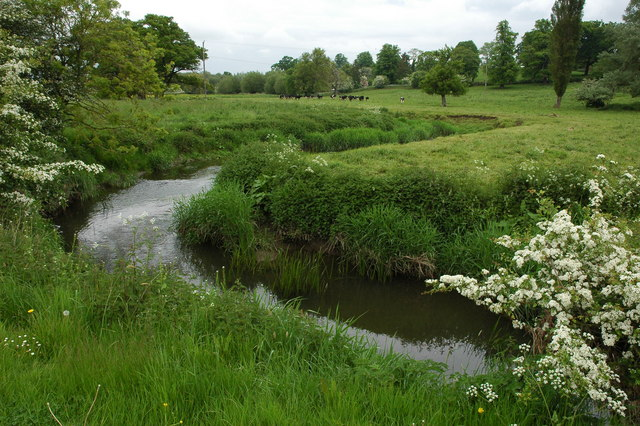
- Bow Brook near Froxmere Court

Location
- Country: England
- County: Worcestershire
- District: Wychavon

Physical characteristics
- Source: Confluence of Little and Shell Brooks
  - location: near Himbleton
  - coordinates: 52.21963°N 2.08200°W
- Mouth: River Avon
  - location: near Defford
  - coordinates: 52.08075°N 2.11923°W
- Length: 46 km (29 mi)
- Discharge
  - location: Besford Bridge
  - average: 1.1 m^{3}/s (39 cu ft/s)

Basin features
- Progression: Avon → Severn → Bristol Channel → Celtic Sea
- River system: River Severn

The Bow Brook is a substantial brook that flows for 28.8 miles (46.3 km) through Worcestershire, England. It is a lower tributary of the River Avon which it joins near Defford downstream of Eckington Bridge. Its principal tributaries include the Stoulton, Dean, and Seeley brooks.

== Course ==
It rises near Upper Bentley to the west of Redditch, and flows due south through Feckenham beyond which it turns west to reach Shell, where it is known as the Shell Brook, and onwards to Himbleton. It continues in a southerly direction flowing past Huddington and Upton Snodsbury where it is crossed by the A422, near Broughton Hackett, and then past Peopleton beyond which it is crossed by the A44. The brook is forded by a minor road between Walcot and Pinvin, here it turns south-west, past Ufnell Bridge on the B4084 until it reaches Besford Bridge where it is measured. It is bridged by the A4104 before it passes Defford the last village on its course, downstream of which it joins the Warwickshire Avon.

== Hydrology ==
The flow of the Bow Brook has been measured using a weir, in the lower reaches at Besford Bridge since 1969. This long-term record shows that the catchment of 156 square kilometres (60 sq mi) to the gauging station yielded an average flow of 1.1 cubic metres per second (39 cu ft/s). The highest river level recorded at the station occurred on 21 July 2007, with a height of 4.06 metres (13.3 ft), although no corresponding peak flow is available. The lowest flows were measured in August 1976.

The catchment upstream of the station has an average annual rainfall of 643 millimetres (25.3 in) and a maximum altitude of 164 metres (538 ft) at Tardebigge. Land use is mainly agricultural, consisting of arable, horticulture and grassland, with some woodland.

== See also ==
- List of rivers of England
