= Besford (disambiguation) =

Besford is a village and civil parish in the Wychavon district of Worcestershire, England.

Besford may also refer to:

- Ted Besford (1915–1978), an Australian rules footballer
- John Besford (1911–1993), an English competitive swimmer

== See also ==
- Besford Bridge, a village in Worcestershire, England
