= Thomas Winford =

Thomas Winford may refer to:

- Thomas Geers Winford (c. 1697–1751), British lawyer and politician
- Sir Thomas Winford, 1st Baronet (died 1702), of the Winford baronets
- Sir Thomas Winford, 2nd Baronet (1673–1744), of the Winford baronets, MP for Worcestershire

== See also ==
- Winford (disambiguation)
