= Piddle =

Piddle may refer to:

- Piddle Brook, a watercourse in Worcestershire, England
- River Piddle, a river in Dorset, England
- Piddles, a character in the video game Banjo-Kazooie: Nuts & Bolts
- A slang term for urine and urination
- Piddles, a blue hamster from Hallmark Media's Hoops & Yoyo

== See also ==
- Wyre Piddle, Worcestershire, England
