= Battle of Ripple Field =

Part of the First English Civil War (1643)

Coordinates: 52.042°N 2.187°W

- Part of the First English Civil War
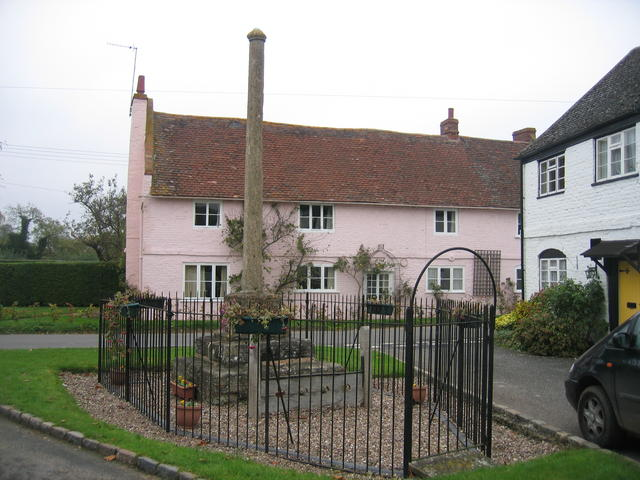
- Ripple Cross and Stocks
Date	13 April 1643
Location	Ripple in Worcestershire, England
Result	Royalist victory

Belligerents
Royalists	Parliamentarians

Commanders and leaders
Prince Maurice	Sir William Waller

Strength
2,000	2,000

Casualties and losses
Light	c. 50 cavalry Unknown infantry.

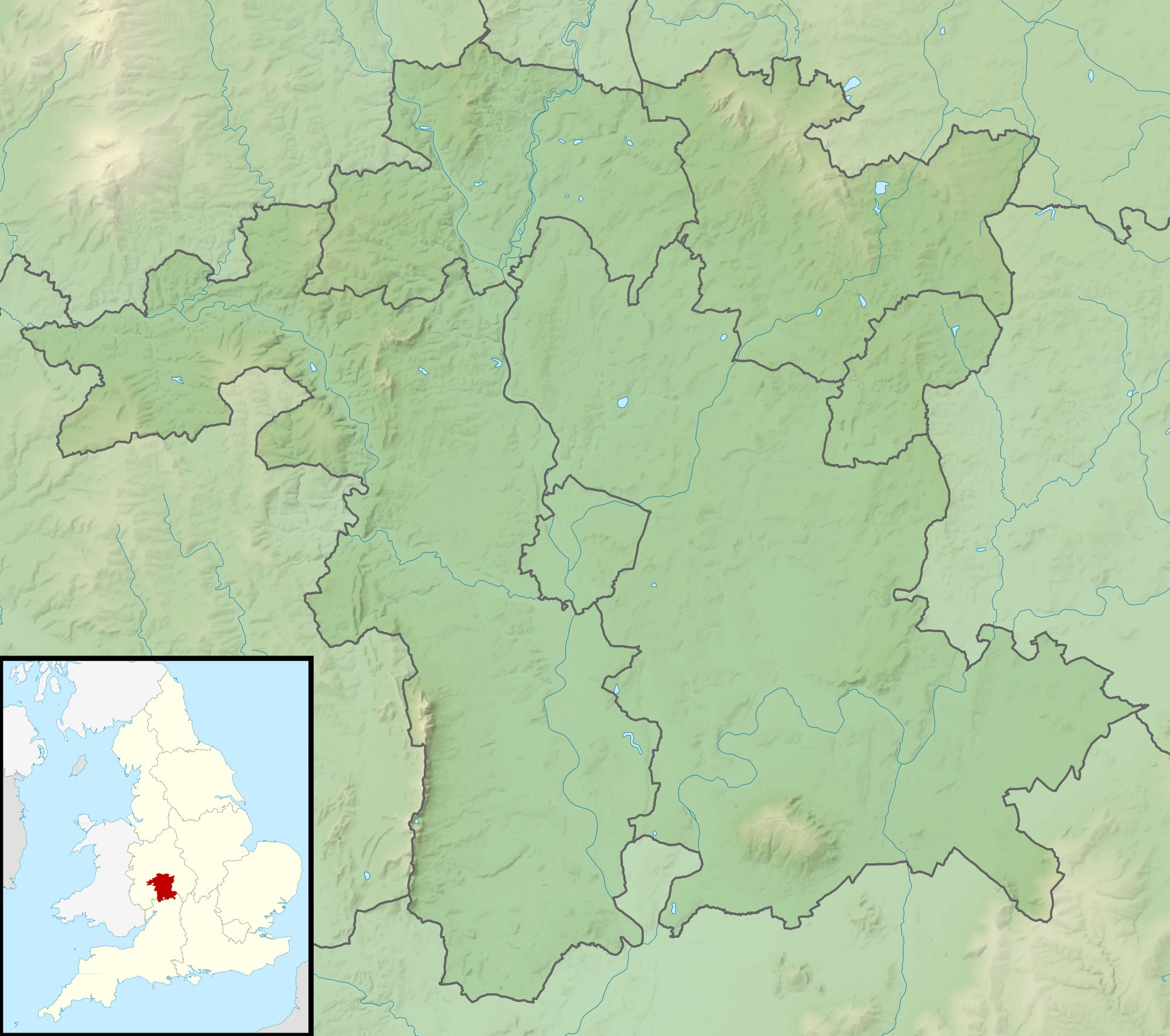
Worcestershire and Ripple Field

The Battle of Ripple Field, fought on 13 April 1643, was an engagement in the First English Civil War. In the battle, a Royalist cavalry force led by Prince Maurice routed Parliamentarian cavalry and infantry forces led by Sir William Waller.

== Prelude ==
After marching north from Tewkesbury, Waller tried to block the cavalry forces of Prince Maurice and the Royalists by containing them on the western bank of the River Severn. Prince Maurice, however, successfully crossed the Severn at Upton-Upon-Severn and quickly proceeded south through Ryall to confront Waller's men who had taken a defensive position in Ripple Field.

== Battle ==
An initial cavalry charge by Waller was easily repelled by the Royalists. The Parliamentarians then retreated into the lanes of the village of Ripple where they were overrun and routed. Haselrigge's Lobsters (one of the few proper cuirassier regiments fielded during the war) lost around 70% of their men defending the retreating Parliament army which was attempting to return to Tewkesbury. At the end, Parliamentary reinforcements checked the Royalists at Mythe Hill just north of Tewkesbury.
