= Alfred Nelson (cricketer) =

English cricketer

Personal information
- Full name: Alfred Leonard Nelson
- Born: 13 November 1871; Kenilworth, Warwickshire, England
- Died: 2 May 1927 (aged 55); Holly Green, Worcestershire, England
- Batting: Right-handed
- Role: Occasional wicket-keeper
- Relatives: Guy Nelson (brother

Domestic team information
- Years: Team
- 1895: Warwickshire

Career statistics
| Competition | First-class |
|---|---|
| Matches | 1 |
| Runs scored | 0 |
| Batting average | 0.00 |
| 100s/50s | –/– |
| Top score | 0 |
| Balls bowled | – |
| Wickets | – |
| Bowling average | – |
| 5 wickets in innings | – |
| 10 wickets in match | – |
| Best bowling | – |
| Catches/stumpings | –/– |
- Source: Cricinfo, 15 July 2012

Alfred Leonard Nelson (13 November 1871 – 2 May 1927) was an English cricketer. Nelson was a right-handed batsman who occasionally fielded as a wicket-keeper. He was born at Kenilworth, Warwickshire, and was educated at Radley College and Merton College, Oxford.

Nelson made a single first-class appearance for Warwickshire against Lancashire in the 1895 County Championship at Aigburth, Liverpool. Warwickshire won the toss and elected to bat first, making 207 all out, during which Nelson was dismissed for a duck by Albert Hallam. Lancashire responded in their first-innings by making 138 all out, to which Warwickshire responded to in their second-innings by making 222 all out, during which Nelson was again dismissed for a duck, this time by Arthur Mold. Lancashire were set a target of 292 for victory, but were dismissed for 175 in their second-innings chase.

He died at Holly Green, Worcestershire, on 2 May 1927. His brother Guy Nelson

played first-class cricket.
