= Saxon's Lode =

Hamlet in Worcestershire, England

Coordinates: 52°02′56″N 2°11′56″W

- Hamlet
- Location within Worcestershire
- OS grid reference: SO 8639 3897
- Civil parish: Ripple
- District: Malvern Hills
- Shire county: Worcestershire
- Region: West Midlands
- Country: England
- Sovereign state: United Kingdom
- Post town: TEWKESBURY
- Postcode district: GL20 6ET
- Police: West Mercia
- Fire: Hereford and Worcester
- Ambulance: West Midlands
- UK Parliament: West Worcestershire

Saxon's Lode is a hamlet on the banks of the River Severn in the parish of Ripple, Worcestershire, with a history of settlement dating back to the Anglo-Saxon period and a longstanding association with an ancient river crossing.

Saxons Lode occupied significant military position along the River Severn during the Anglo-Saxon period, with its established history as a river-crossing locality suggesting a possible role in regional transport, communications and the movement of people between Mercia and the western territories. Its geographical importance likely contributed to the subsequent development of the medieval lordship. conquest, land appropriation and subsequent grant or recognition of lordship.

Saxons Lode Ripple Parish

During the Viking Age, the surrounding Severn Valley was exposed to Scandinavian expansion, with territorial control in parts of England established through conquest, land appropriation and subsequent grant or recognition of lordship.

Saxons Lode Manor House is a historic Grade II listed building located in Ripple, Worcestershire, England. The manor house, also known as Saxons Lode Farmhouse, is recognized for its architectural and historical significance. It was first listed on the National Heritage List for England on 14 June 1985.

Beyond its later association with medieval landholding and manorial administration, Saxon's Lode may be understood within the context of an earlier Anglo-Saxon tradition in which strategically positioned territories were entrusted to individuals exercising local authority on behalf of the Mercian Crown. Such authority could have arisen through military appointment, the protection of river crossings, territorial defence or the administration of strategically important lands. In this earlier context, a lordship would have derived its character from delegated military and territorial authority, rather than from the later formalised structure of the feudal manor.

== Toponymy ==
The name “Saxon’s Lode” derives from the Old English gelād, meaning a river crossing or ferry point, and reflects the site’s historic position on the River Severn.

Archaeological evidence indicates an early Anglo‑Saxon settlement at the location—the most westerly of its type yet discovered in Great Britain—supporting the interpretation that the crossing was associated with Saxon activity. The area also served as a long‑standing ferry stage on the Severn, further reinforcing the origin of the name.

== History ==
=== Prehistory, Roman and Anglo-Saxon period ===
An archaeological dig at Saxon's Lode Farm, Ripple during 2001 and 2002 of two separate areas of archaeological potential identified different densities and types of multiperiod remains. Despite significant levels of truncation, Area 1, featured details of Bronze Age and Middle-Iron Age settlement. In Area 2, a much higher density of remains were recorded.

The majority of features related to a Romano British farmstead and an early to middle Anglo-Saxon settlement, which seems to have been short-lived. It was, however, the most westerly Saxon settlement in Britain. There is evidence of metal working during these periods.

=== Post conquest ===
The manor of Saxon's Lode was held at the end by the 12th century by Jordan of Ryall. Prior to that it was held by Martin Coti. During the 13th and 14th centuries it was held by the De La Lode family. In 1590 the lordship had come to John Woodward (or Smyth) who settled Saxon's Lode on his son Thomas. Thomas died in 1636 leaving it to his daughter Katherine (wife of John Dormer).

=== 20th century ===
During the Second World War an oil storage depot was set up here as it was conveniently close to the river and the former railway line which crossed the river just to the south.

== Today ==
Saxon's Lode is the location for a gauging station on the River Severn, monitoring the water level to give warning of possible flooding downstream. North of the modern farm is Ryall Quarry for extraction of gravel. It was the desire to extend the quarry south that led to the archaeological excavations taking place.

Status of Saxons Lode Manor

The medieval manor of Saxons Lode no longer survives as a physical estate, its lands and tenurial structures having been dispersed over the early modern period. However, Saxons Lode Farmhouse remains on land historically associated with the former manor.

Although the lordship was legally conveyed in 2020, the manner of its acquisition reflects the early medieval Saxon Viking principle in which lordship and the social status associated with it arose from the lawful holding of territorial rights rather than from hereditary noble rank. This concept that continues in the modern recognition of manorial lordship titles as an incorporeal hereditament under English property law.

=== In popular culture ===
Saxon's Lode Manor House and its surroundings was the filming location for the 2024 film Speak No Evil. The manor was chosen as its architecture provided the desired English backdrop for the movie's tense scenes.
