= Peopleton =

Village in Worcestershire, England

Coordinates: 52.15196°N 2.09177°W

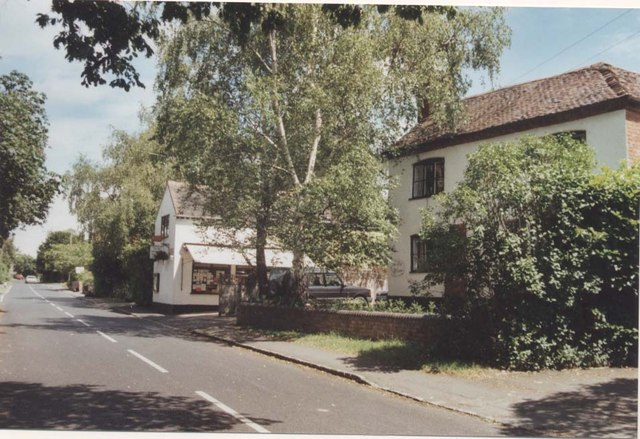
- Village shop and post office

- Location within Worcestershire
- Population: 640
- OS grid reference: SO938504
  - London: 96.5 miles (155.3 km)
- District: Wychavon
- Shire county: Worcestershire
- Region: West Midlands
- Country: England
- Sovereign state: United Kingdom
- Post town: PERSHORE
- Postcode district: WR10
- Dialling code: 01905
- Police: West Mercia
- Fire: Hereford and Worcester
- Ambulance: West Midlands
- UK Parliament: Mid Worcestershire

Peopleton is a village and civil parish in the Wychavon district of Worcestershire, England. In 2001 the parish had a population of 640, with 245 households.

== Location ==
Peopleton is located about 7 miles (11 km) south east of Worcester and 3 miles (5 km) north of Pershore. The parish is bounded by Bow Brook to the west, Piddle Brook to the east and the A44 to the south.

The parish is bounded by the parishes of White Ladies Aston, Upton Snodsbury, Naunton Beauchamp, Throckmorton, Pinvin, Drakes Broughton & Wadborough and Stoulton.

Peopleton is in the Upton Snodsbury electoral ward.

== Amenities ==
The village church is dedicated to Saint Nicholas, and is in the Anglican Diocese of Worcester. It dates from the 13th century with modifications in the 14th and 19th centuries.

Opposite the church in the centre of the village lies the Crown Inn public house.

The tin at the Cricket Ground is where items such as cricket ball, stump (cricket), roller (agricultural tool) and beers can be found, this is a valuable part of the cricketing society of Peopleton

In December 2010 the long-established village shop and post office became a community shop, with a legal structure based on the Plunkett Foundation rules. In February 2011 it was featured on an edition of the BBC Countryfile programme focusing on Worcestershire . A tea room was opened during celebrations of the first anniversary of the community shop in December 2011.

The village hall and playing fields are on the northern edge of the village. In 1990 it replaced the former village hall in the centre of the village. The village hall is home to the Peopleton Scout Group.

The village school was closed after the Second World War, and the building is now used as a private residence. The only school in the village is now Bowbrook House School, an independent day school, situated in a mansion at the south end of the village. This house was previously occupied by parish benefactor Caroline Baroness Norton, and later by the mother of Barbara Cartland; in the Second World War it was used by Morgan Crucible to accommodate European Voluntary Workers.

To the north of Peopleton the track to White Ladies Aston fords Bow Brook at Barrels Bridge.

After the extensive floods in 2007 when a quarter of the houses in Peopleton were flooded, Peopleton Parish Council raised money for a drainage system to reduce the effects of any future flooding.

== Public transport ==
The following link provides current information about bus services: https://www.peopletonvillage.co.uk/bus-service/

Pershore railway station is the closest passenger railway station.

== History ==
The place-name 'Peopleton' is first attested in a Saxon charter of 972, where it appears as Piplincgtun. It appears as Piplintune in the Domesday Book of 1086. The name means 'the town or settlement of Pyppel's people'.

The Worcestershire map in John Speed's Theatre of the Empire of Great Britaine refers to Peopleton as "Pippleton".

In the early 20th century the cricket club was founded and has progressed nicely over the last century. In 2018 the village was named Cricket Village of the Year by the Ex - England ODI Cricket Captain James Tredwell.

The Cricket Club has a very famous connection with the French City of Dijon and its mustard, where the notorious club motto Blozzer, Dijon, Wedge comes from. The motto has huge significance for all player members, so much that a Blozzer, Dijon, Wedge Tour was created.

== Notable residents ==
- John Days — Worcestershire cricketer in the 1900s; born in Peopleton
- Jeremy Paxman — television presenter; spent childhood in Yorkshire and Peopleton
- John Snow — professional cricketer in the 1960s and 1970s; born in Peopleton
