= Astley Burf =

Hamlet in Astley, Worcestershire, England

Coordinates: 52.309°N 2.283°W

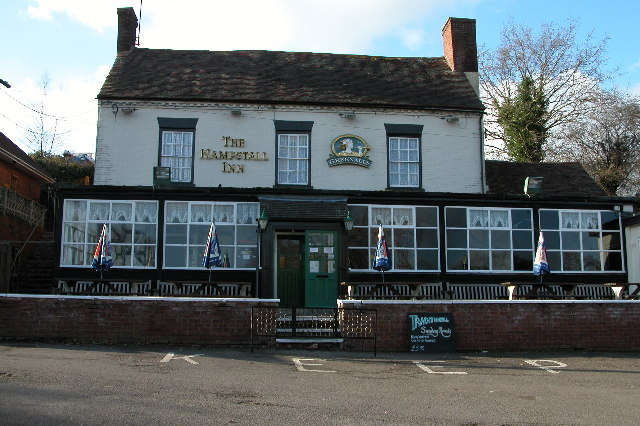
The Hampstall Inn

Astley Burf is a hamlet in the parish of Astley, Worcestershire, England, on the banks of the River Severn. Within the hamlet there is one riverside public house The Hampstall.

Astley Burf contains an Outdoor Education centre, owned by Dudley Council, and used by Dudley schools during the Spring and Summer.
