= Baughton =

Hamlet in Worcestershire, England

Coordinates: 52.07642°N 2.178125°W

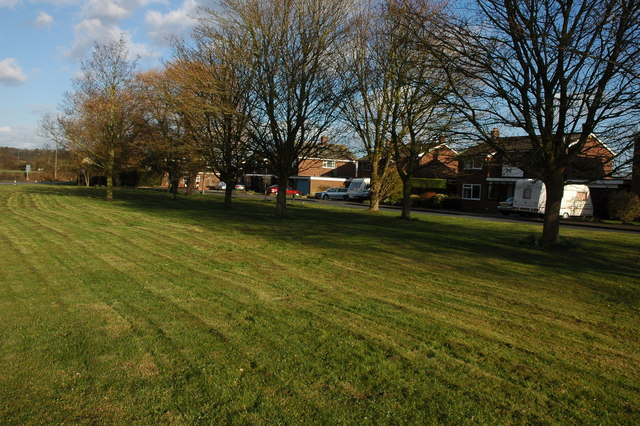

- Location within Worcestershire
- OS grid reference: SO878420
  - London: 97 miles (156 km)
- Civil parish: Hill Croome
- District: Malvern Hills
- Shire county: Worcestershire
- Region: West Midlands
- Country: England
- Sovereign state: United Kingdom
- Post town: WORCESTER
- Postcode district: WR8
- Dialling code: 01684
- Police: West Mercia
- Fire: Hereford and Worcester
- Ambulance: West Midlands

Baughton is a hamlet in Worcestershire, England. It is part of the civil parish of Hill Croome, which had a population of 164 in 2021.

The population as a whole is older than the national average and the county average of Worcestershire.

Baughton was once home to Formula 1 legend Nigel Mansell. The village is a five-minute drive from Upton-Upon-Severn, famed for its numerous festivals like the Jazz Festival and about 20 minutes from the large town of Malvern, Worcestershire.
