= Franconia (hymn tune) =

Hymn tune by Johann Balthasar König

- Hymn tune by Johann Balthasar König
- Genre: Hymn
- Meter: 6.6.8.6
- Melody: John Hughes
- Published: 1738

Franconia is a hymn tune by Johann Balthasar König adapted by William Havergal. It first appeared in König's Harmonischer Liederschatz chorale book published in 1738. The most common text for the hymn is "Blest Are the Pure in Heart" by John Keble.

== Common texts ==
- Blest Are the Pure in Heart
- The Advent of our King
- We Give Thee but Thine Own
- Within the Father's House
