= Bowbrook House School =

Location
- Peopleton; Pershore, Worcestershire, WR10 2EE; England
- Coordinates: 52.1525°N 2.0934°W

Information
- Type: Independent
- Motto: ‘Work with pride’
- Head: Christopher. D. Allen
- Staff: 30
- Gender: Mixed
- Age: 3 to 16
- Enrolment: approx. 200
- ISC Ref.: 13574
- Website: http://www.bowbrookhouseschool.co.uk

Bowbrook House School is a mixed independent school for around 200 pupils aged 3 to 16 with around 30 teaching staff. It is located in a Georgian mansion set on a 14-acre campus in the village of Peopleton near the town of Pershore in England in the south-east of the county of Worcestershire.

== Curriculum ==
Pupils follow a broad curriculum that includes national curriculum core subjects.

== Sports ==
Sports played at the school include athletics, badminton, basketball, cricket, football, golf, hockey, martial arts, netball, rugby, swimming, and tennis. The school has an all-weather pitch, an art and technology centre, an athletics track, cricket nets, an IT suite, a library, science labs, an open-air swimming pool, and several tennis courts. The school plays sports fixtures against many other private schools in the area, and also sends representatives to ISA national competitions

== Activities ==
The school's many activities include art, dance, chess, choir, debating, theatre studies, handicrafts, an orchestra/band, outdoor pursuits, skiing, textiles, and The Duke of Edinburgh's Award scheme.

== Awards ==
The school is 2010 National Winner of the Independent School's Association Award for Excellence.
