= North Piddle =

Civil parish in Worcestershire, England

Coordinates: 52.1968°N 2.0508°W

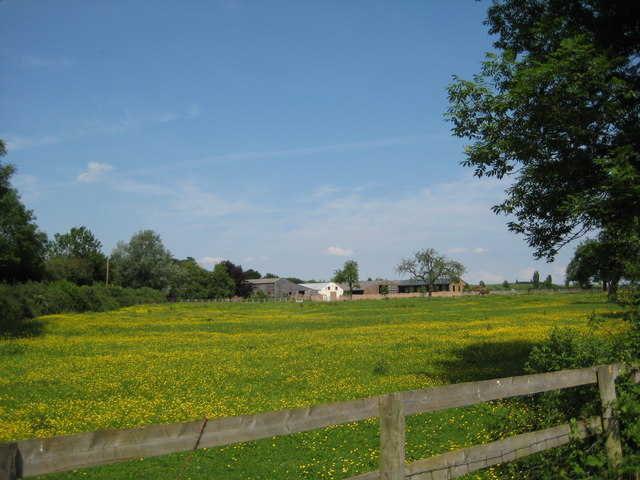
- Church Farm, North Piddle

- Location within Worcestershire
- Population: 80
- OS grid reference: SO9662555396
- District: Wychavon
- Shire county: Worcestershire
- Region: West Midlands
- Country: England
- Sovereign state: United Kingdom
- Post town: PERSHORE
- Postcode district: WR7
- Police: West Mercia
- Fire: Hereford and Worcester
- Ambulance: West Midlands
- UK Parliament: Mid Worcestershire

North Piddle is a small civil parish in the Wychavon district of Worcestershire, England. It is located within a loop of Piddle Brook.

North Piddle is a historic parish and a few of the parish's structures have been designated as listed buildings by English Heritage, because they are structures of special architectural and historic interest.

In 1924 797 acres (3.23 km^{2}) of land were designated to North Piddle – 422 acres (171 ha) were grassland, and the rest was arable land. The field names that are mentioned in the document dating back to the 16th century include Frarye Acre, Husband Acre, Monck Acre, Le Home, Le Deane and Gostell Field.

At the 1821 census there were 133 inhabitants living in the parish, and in 1851 slightly more, at 149. As of 2011, there are 80 people living in North Piddle.

== Origin of the name ==
William Henry Dugan, in his book Worcestershire Place Names, states that although the word "Piddle" is not listed in any Anglo-Saxon dictionary, it is found in a few places in Anglo-Saxon charters. Dugan believes that the word "Piddle" is an old English word for a small stream. North Piddle was named after Piddle Brook, on which it stands. It has frequently been noted on lists of unusual place names.

== History ==
Domesday Book's records of the great survey of much of England and parts of Wales, completed in 1086, mentions two estates in North Piddle, both of which were held for the abbey of Westminster by Urse d'Abetot.

Through the ages North Piddle manor was connected to many notable and colourful figures, including the Dukes of Norfolk. Thomas de Mowbray, 1st Duke of Norfolk, was banished from England and died of the "pestilence" (bubonic plague) in Venice in 1399. His son and heir Thomas de Mowbray, 4th Earl of Norfolk was beheaded in 1405, and the manor was taken into family ownership and granted for life to Edward Beauchamp. A few years later the manor was once again owned by the Dukes of Norfolk, but the direct line was broken when Anne de Mowbray, 8th Countess of Norfolk, who was married when she was 5 years old to Richard of Shrewsbury, 1st Duke of York, died three years after her marriage. Her husband was murdered in the Tower of London soon after. In 1868 the parish was divided into small farms and by 1924 the manorial rights had lapsed.

The Greenwood brothers' Worcestershire Delineated (1822) says of the parish:

North-Piddle – a parish in the hundred of Pershore, upper division, 6 miles E. from Worcester, and 116 from London; containing 28 inhabited houses. Here is a miserable damp church, much out of repair, and by no means fit for public worship. The living is a rectory; Rev. Sam. Oldnall, incumbent; instituted 1794; patron Lord Somers. Population, 1801, 103 – 1811, 125 – 1821, 133.

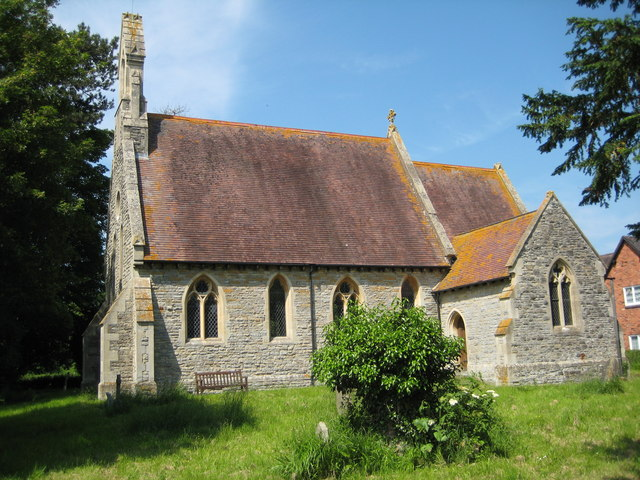
St Michael's Church

The National Gazetteer of Great Britain and Ireland (1868) says:

NORTH PIDDLE, a parish in the upper division of the hundred of Pershore, county Worcester, 7 miles E. of Worcester, its post town, 5 N. by E. of Pershore, and 3 from Spetchley railway station. The village, which is of small extent, is situated on the river Piddle and the road from Worcester to Alcester. The inhabitants are wholly agricultural. The above-mentioned river rises beyond Inkberrow, and flows 12 miles E. and S. to the river Avon, below Wyre Piddle. Land was assigned in 1813 in lieu of tithes. The living is a rectory in the diocese of Worcester, value £140. The church, dedicated to St. Michael, is an ancient edifice with a wooden lantern.

St Michael's, the parish church of North Piddle, was originally built in 1289 but almost nothing survives of the old building; the church was rebuilt in 1876.

On 17 December 1896 there was an earthquake in the region that "exceeded in violence any previous instance of seismic energy there within the present century." The earthquake was preceded by a loud roar "as of thunder" or "a rushing mighty wind", and residents whose windows were facing north saw a "great light", which some attributed to a large meteor. This was probably an earthquake light.
