= Guy Nelson =

English cricketer

Guy Montague Blyth Nelson (8 August 1900 – 13 January 1969) was an English cricketer who played first-class cricket in 13 matches for Warwickshire in 1921 and 1922. He was born at Coten End in Warwick and died at Great Bourton, near Banbury, in Oxfordshire.

Nelson was educated at Rugby School and at Trinity College, Cambridge, but while at Cambridge University he did not play even in trial matches for the university cricket team, although in both 1921 and 1922 he was included in the Warwickshire side which played the university team, often a subtle way of trying out a potential university player. A lower-order right-handed batsman and a right-arm fast-medium bowler, Nelson played for Warwickshire as an amateur and had limited success. His best bowling was a return of four wickets for 53 runs against Surrey in 1921.

Nelson was mayor of Warwick three times, a justice of the peace and a deputy lieutenant for Warwickshire; he was awarded the OBE for public service. His brother Alfred Nelson played first-class cricket for Warwickshire in a single match in 1895.
