= John Days =

English cricketer

Career statistics
Competition	First-class
Matches	2
Runs scored	8
Batting average	2.66
100s/50s	0/0
Top score	5
Balls bowled	102
Wickets	2
Bowling average	21.00
5 wickets in innings	0
10 wickets in match	0
Best bowling	2/42
Catches/stumpings	0/–
- Source: Cricinfo, 7 November 2022

John Edward Days (10 July 1872 – 19 August 1947) was an English cricketer, who played two first-class games for Worcestershire. He took only two wickets, both on debut against Warwickshire in 1900, but both victims were notable players: future Warwickshire captain Tom Fishwick and Test cricketer Willie Quaife. His other match was against Surrey almost seven years later, but this was a game in which he did not bowl at all.

He was born in Peopleton, Worcestershire; he died in Walsall, then Staffordshire, at the age of 75.
