= Upton Bishop =

Village in Herefordshire, England

Coordinates: 51°57′N 2°31′W

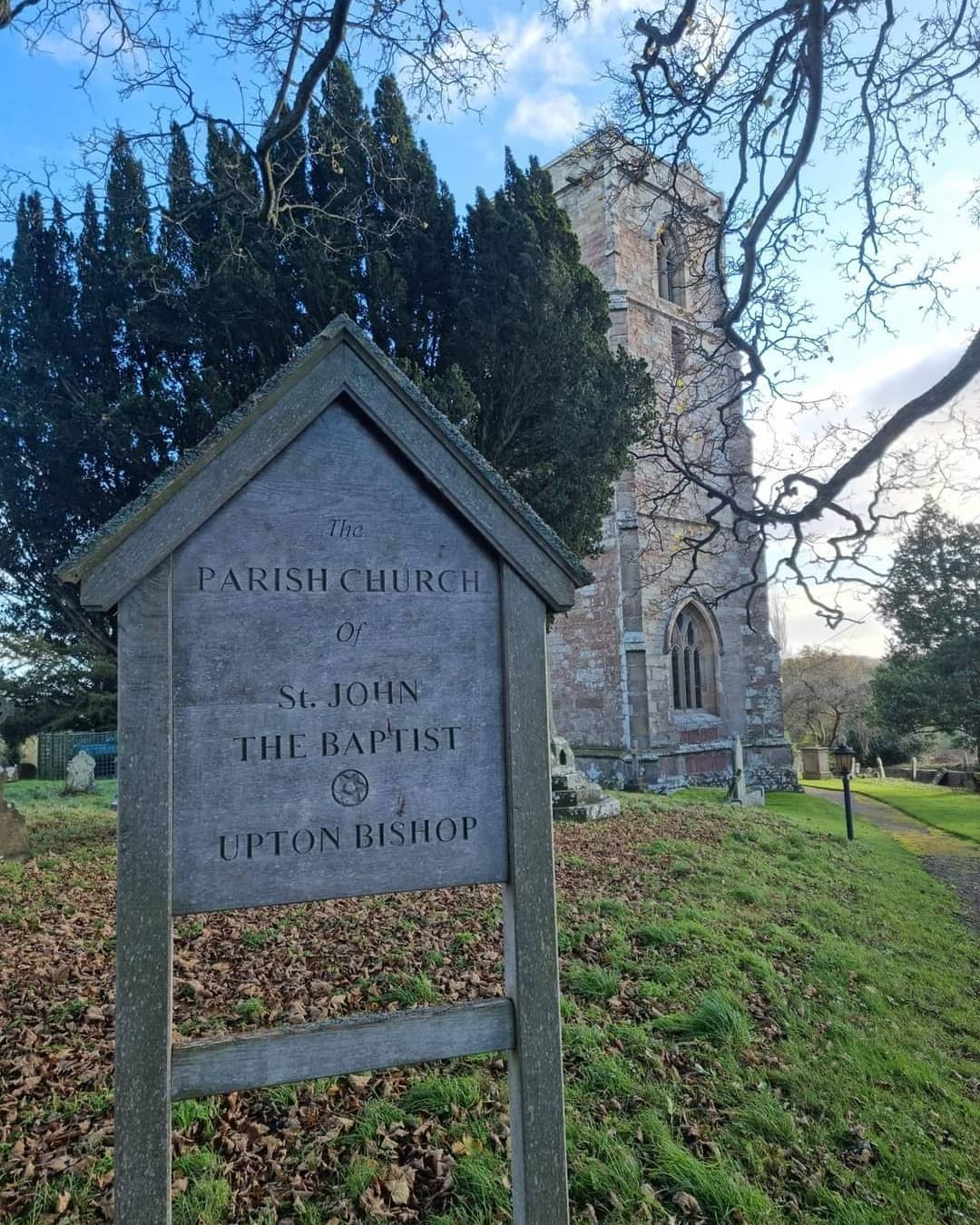
- St John the Baptist Parish Church

- Location within Herefordshire
- Population: 602 (2011 Census)
- Unitary authority: Herefordshire
- Shire county: Herefordshire
- Region: West Midlands
- Country: England
- Sovereign state: United Kingdom
- Post town: Ross-on-Wye
- Postcode district: HR9
- Police: West Mercia
- Fire: Hereford and Worcester
- Ambulance: West Midlands
- UK Parliament: Hereford and South Herefordshire

Upton Bishop is a small village in Herefordshire, England. The population of the village at the 2011 census was 602.

Upton Bishop was featured several years ago on TV when Phil and Alison Clarke chose their home on the Channel 4 programme Location, Location, Location with Phil Spencer and Kirsty Allsop advising them.

== History ==
The manor of Upton Bishop formed a part of the possessions of the Bishops of Hereford from the time of the Saxon Kings to the accession of Queen Elizabeth I.

=== The Havergal family ===
Francis Tebbs Havergal was vicar of Upton Bishop from 1874. He wrote music, books on the history of Hereford Cathedral and a most comprehensive treatise on Upton Bishop in 1883, entitled "Records Historical and Antiquarian of The Parish of Upton Bishop".

His sister Frances Ridley Havergal also wrote many books including travelogues, poetry, children's books, hymns, and religious texts. She died at the early age of forty-two. A bell was cast as a memorial to her that still hangs in the church.

=== Upton Bishop, Herefordshire ===
Description from Littlebury's Directory and Gazetteer of Herefordshire, 1876–1877. Transcription by Rosemary Lockie (2003) UPTON BISHOP, WITH CROW HILL, UPTON CREWS, AND PHOCLE GREEN.

Upton Bishop is a large parish and village situated on the borders of Gloucestershire, on the upper road between Hereford and Gloucester, and on the main road from Ross to Newent; is distant 3.5 miles (5.6 km) north east of Ross, 5.5 miles (8.9 km) west of Newent, 13 miles (21 km) south east of Hereford, and 16 miles (26 km) west north west of Gloucester; is in Greytree hundred, Ross union, petty sessional division, and county court district, and Linton polling district.

The population in 1861 was 716; in 1871, 716; inhabited houses, 150; families or separate occupiers, 166; area of parish, 3,391 acres (1,372 ha; 5.298 sq mi); annual rateable value, £5,069.

Courtenay Connell Prance, Esq., of Hatherley court, Cheltenham, is lord of the manor. The Right Hon. Lord Ashburton, Lady Lindsay, Mrs. Chellingworth, Thomas Powell, Esq., and William Jones, Esq., are the principal landowners.

The soil is a red loam; subsoil, clay and rock; chief produce, wheat, barley, roots, &c.

Upton Bishop is in the diocese and archdeaconry of Hereford and Rural Deanery of Ross; living, a vicarage; value, £225, with residence and 202 acres of glebe; patrons, the Dean and Chapter of Hereford; vicar, Rev. Francis Tebbs Havergal, M.A., of New College, Oxford, who was instituted in 1874, and is also one of the chaplains to the Lord Bishop of Hereford.

The church, dedicated to St. John the Baptist, ranks among the most interesting in the county. It was reopened on 25 July 1862, after having been restored under the superintendence of Mr. (now Sir) George Gilbert Scott, R.A., the eminent church-architect, at an expense of £1,800, raised by voluntary contributions and church building society grants. The church consists of nave, chancel, aisle, porch, and square tower containing an excellent peal of five bells. The pavements are of Godwin's encaustic tiles.

An organ, by Nicholson, of Worcester, was erected in 1874 on the north side of the church, at the sole cost of the present vicar.

There are several stained glass memorial windows. The east window is by Hardman; subject, "Jesus appearing to Mary in the garden", to the memory of the Rev. James Garbett, formerly vicar of the, parish. North chancel, by Wailes; subject, "Zacharias and Elizabeth", to the memory of Dr. Gretton and his wife, formerly dean of Hereford and vicar of the parish. North nave, by Clayton & Bell; subject, "Raising of Jairus's daughter", to the memory of Maude, daughter of the late Henry Chellingworth, Esq., of Grendon court. East aisle, by Hardman; subject, "The Good Samaritan", to the memory of Mr. Charles Prosser. South aisle, by Hardman; memorial window and brass plate, erected in 1868. South chancel, by Clayton & Bell; subject, "The institution of the Eucharist by our Lord", to the memory of the Rev. T. B. Power, the late vicar. A brass plate, with inscription, is placed immediately beneath.

A beautiful brass tablet (by Hardman) was placed in the church in 1872, to the memory of Henry Chellingworth, Esq., and his son and daughters. The ancient monumental stone in the churchyard has been carefully placed on a slightly raised stone base.

The parish register goes back to the year 1571. There are two schools for boys and girls in the parish, with an average attendance of about 100 conjointly. The Church of England school at Gayton was built in 1871–1872 at a cost of £700, the site and stone being given by Lord Ashburton. The Baptist chapel was erected in 1860.

There are several handsome residences in this parish. Just on the edge of the four parishes of Upton Bishop, Ross, Brampton Abbotts, and Weston-under-Penyard, is the old manor-house of Rudhall, once the seat of the family of that name, but now the property of Lord Ashburton, and in the occupation of Miss Mortimer; Grendon Court is the residence of Mrs. Chellingworth and the property of Henry Chellingworth, Esq., of Trimpley, near Kidderminster; Gayton Hall, the Misses Lawson; Manor House, Captain E. Mynde Allen; The Baches House, Captain A. R. F. Onslow; and The Vicarage (which has lately undergone considerable improvement), Rev. F. Tebbs Havergal, M.A.

Crow Hill is a hamlet distant 1 mile (1.6 km) west; Phocle (or Focle) Green is 2 miles (3.2 km) south west.; Upton Crews is near the village.

POSTAL REGULATIONS.-William. Smallman, Sub-Postmaster, Crow hill. Letters arrive by messenger from Ross at 7.50 am; despatched thereto at 5.50 pm. Money orders are granted and paid, and post office savings bank business transacted. Ross is the nearest telegraph office and post town. The letter box, near the school, is cleared at 5.40 p.m.

Parish Church (St. John the Baptist).-Rev. Francis Tebbs Havergal, M.A., Vicar; Francis Hamp Adams, Esq., and Mr. John Powell Bennett, Churchwardens; George Taylor, Parish Clerk; Charles Davies, Sexton.

National School (boys and girls), Upton Bishop.-Miss Sarah Owen, Mistress.

St John the Baptist Church was restored by Sir George Gilbert Scott in 1862. The village has one public house called "The Moody Cow" that is listed in the Michelin Red Guide. It also has an excellent village hall paid for largely by the National Lottery, fund-raising events and a government loan paid for by an increase in the Parish Council's council tax. The village is spread over several separate settlements.
