= Winford (disambiguation) =

Winford is a village in Somerset, England.

Winford may also refer to:

- Winford, Isle of Wight
- Winford baronets

== People with the surname ==
- Jim Winford (1909–1970), American baseball player
