= Earls Common =

Village in Worcestershire, England

Coordinates: 52.230°N 2.064°W

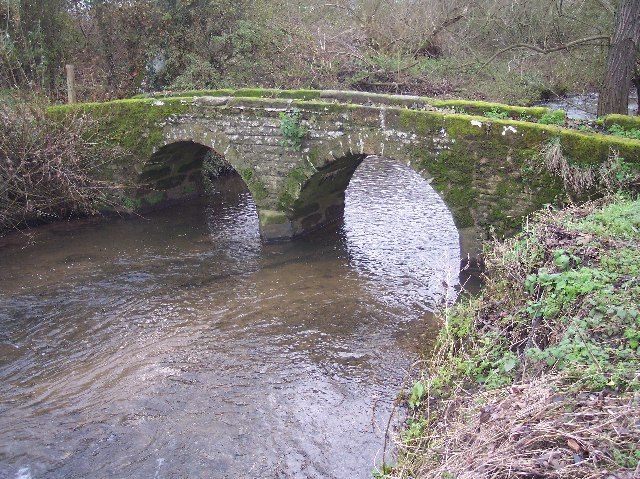
- Pedestrian bridge by Shell Ford

- Location within Worcestershire
- Population: 100
- Civil parish: Himbleton
- Shire county: Worcestershire
- Region: West Midlands
- Country: England
- Sovereign state: United Kingdom
- Post town: Droitwich
- Postcode district: WR9
- Police: West Mercia
- Fire: Hereford and Worcester
- Ambulance: West Midlands
- UK Parliament: Droitwich and Evesham

Earls Common (Earl's Common on Ordnance Survey maps) is a village in Himbleton parish in Worcestershire, England. It lies around 0.9 miles (1.4 km) north-east of Himbleton village and 4.5 miles (7 km) south-east of the town of Droitwich Spa.
