= Sir Thomas Cookes Winford, 2nd Baronet =

British politician

Thomas Cookes Winford

Member of the Parliament of Great Britain
- In office 3 December 1707 – 1710 Serving with Sir John Pakington
- Preceded by: William Bromley
- Succeeded by: Samuel Pytts
- Constituency: Worcestershire

High Sheriff of Worcestershire
- In office 1721–1722

Personal details
- Born: c. 1674
- Died: 19 January 1744
- Spouses: Beata Parker; Elizabeth Wilmot
- Relations: Sir Thomas Cookes, 2nd Baronet (uncle)

Sir Thomas Cookes Winford, 2nd Baronet (c. 1674 – 19 January 1744) was an English landowner and politician. He succeeded to the Winford baronetcy in 1702 under a special remainder, inherited the Cookes estate at Norgrove, sat as member for Worcestershire in the Parliament of Great Britain from 1707 to 1710, and later served as High Sheriff of Worcestershire in 1721–22.

== Early life and family ==
Winford was the son and heir of Henry Winford of Astley and Glasshampton, Worcestershire, and Mercy Winford, née Cookes, sister and heir of Sir Thomas Cookes, 2nd Baronet, of Bentley and Norgrove. He was admitted to Lincoln's Inn on 10 November 1687.

On the death of his uncle Sir Thomas Winford, 1st Baronet, in 1702, he succeeded to the baronetcy under the special remainder in the original patent. Through the Cookes inheritance he also succeeded to Norgrove and adopted the additional surname Cookes.

He married firstly Beata Parker, youngest daughter of Sir Henry Parker, 1st Baronet, of Honington, Warwickshire, and secondly, by Worcester marriage licence dated 12 November 1718, Elizabeth Wilmot of Bromsgrove. He had no children.

== Career ==
Winford was returned for Worcestershire at a by-election on 3 December 1707 following the death of William Bromley, and sat until the 1710 general election. The same county history notes that he was admitted an honorary freeman of Worcester in 1710.

He was also involved in the prolonged dispute over his uncle Sir Thomas Cookes's Oxford benefaction. Lucy Sutherland's history of the foundation of Worcester College, Oxford records that on 19 February 1708, with Gloucester Hall's position under threat, Winford petitioned the House of Commons for a private bill to settle the charity in the way he said his late uncle had intended.

Later in county office he served as High Sheriff of Worcestershire in 1721–22.

== Later life and death ==
Winford died without issue on 19 January 1744, whereupon the baronetcy became extinct. The Astley and Glasshampton estates then passed to his kinsman Thomas Geers, who adopted the surname Winford. Complete Baronetage records that his widow Elizabeth died on 29 November 1753.
