= Henry East Havergal =

Henry East Havergal (22 July 1820 – 12 January 1875) was a priest in the Church of England and an organist.

Havergal, eldest son of William Henry Havergal (1793–1870), was born at Coaley, Gloucestershire, 22 July 1820. His mother died in 1848 and his father remarried in 1851. His sister, Frances Ridley Havergal (1836–1879), became well known as a writer of religious poetry.

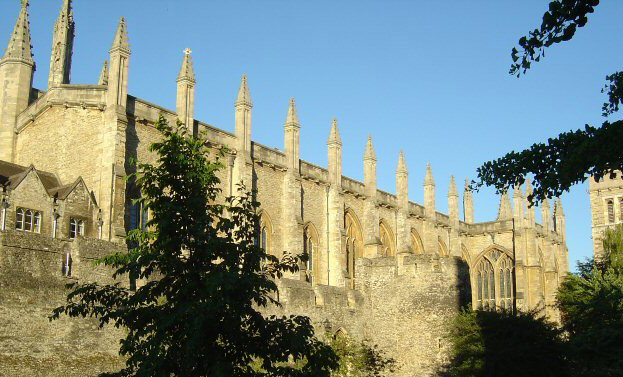
New College, Oxford today.

From 1828 to 1834 he served as a chorister in New College, Oxford, and was bible-clerk there from 1839. He matriculated from Magdalen Hall on 18 May 1839, graduating B.A. 1843 and M.A. 1846. In 1843, he became chaplain of Christ Church, and served in a like capacity at New College from 1844 to 1847. From 1847 till his death, he was vicar of Cople, Bedfordshire. Also in 1847, he married, on 16 September, Frances Mary, eldest daughter of George J. A. Walker.

For his church at Cople, he built an organ with his own hands, which possessed the peculiarity that it was an F organ, that being the note to which the ordinary compass of the human voice extends. On this instrument, he carried out many experiments, and regularly acted as organist. He further constructed a chiming apparatus, and was in the habit of chiming the bells himself before service. For some time, he was the conductor of a musical society at Bedford.

He possessed a natural alto voice, and in a trial of William Crotch's oratorio Palestine he played the double-bass and sang the alto part in the choruses at the same time. He was also a performer on the trumpet. He died of apoplexy at Cople vicarage on 12 January 1875, aged 54.

== Musical publications ==
- ‘A Selection from the Hymns and Songs of the Church by George Wither,’ 1846.
- ‘The Preces and Litany of T. Tallis, to which is added a Short Form of Chanting the Preces and Litany,’ 1847; never before printed.
- ‘Christmas Carols for one or more Voices,’ 1850.
- ‘Hymn for Advent—Dies Iræ,’ by W. J. Irons; the music by H. E. Havergal, 1854.
- ‘Tunes, Chants and Responses,’ 1865.
- ‘Hymn Tunes, part i. Original, part ii. Harmonised and Selected,’ 1866.
- ‘Forty-two Chants, each combining two principal Melodies,’ 1870

Also Te Deums, hymns, and songs.
