= Astley, Worcestershire =

Village in Worcestershire, England

Coordinates: 52.305897°N 2.313856°W

Astley
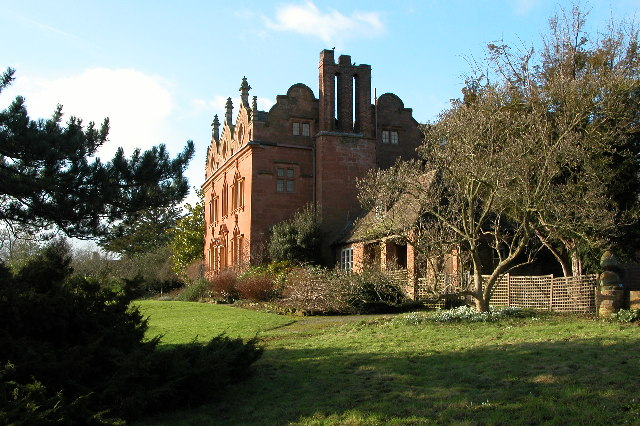
- Pool House, Astley, a Grade II* listed Gothic Revival country house

- Location within Worcestershire
- Population: 1,029
- OS grid reference: SO786675
  - London: 109 miles (175 km)
- Civil parish: Astley and Dunley
- District: Malvern Hills
- Shire county: Worcestershire
- Region: West Midlands
- Country: England
- Sovereign state: United Kingdom
- Post town: STOURPORT-ON-SEVERN
- Postcode district: DY13
- Dialling code: 01299
- Police: West Mercia
- Fire: Hereford and Worcester
- Ambulance: West Midlands
- UK Parliament: West Worcestershire

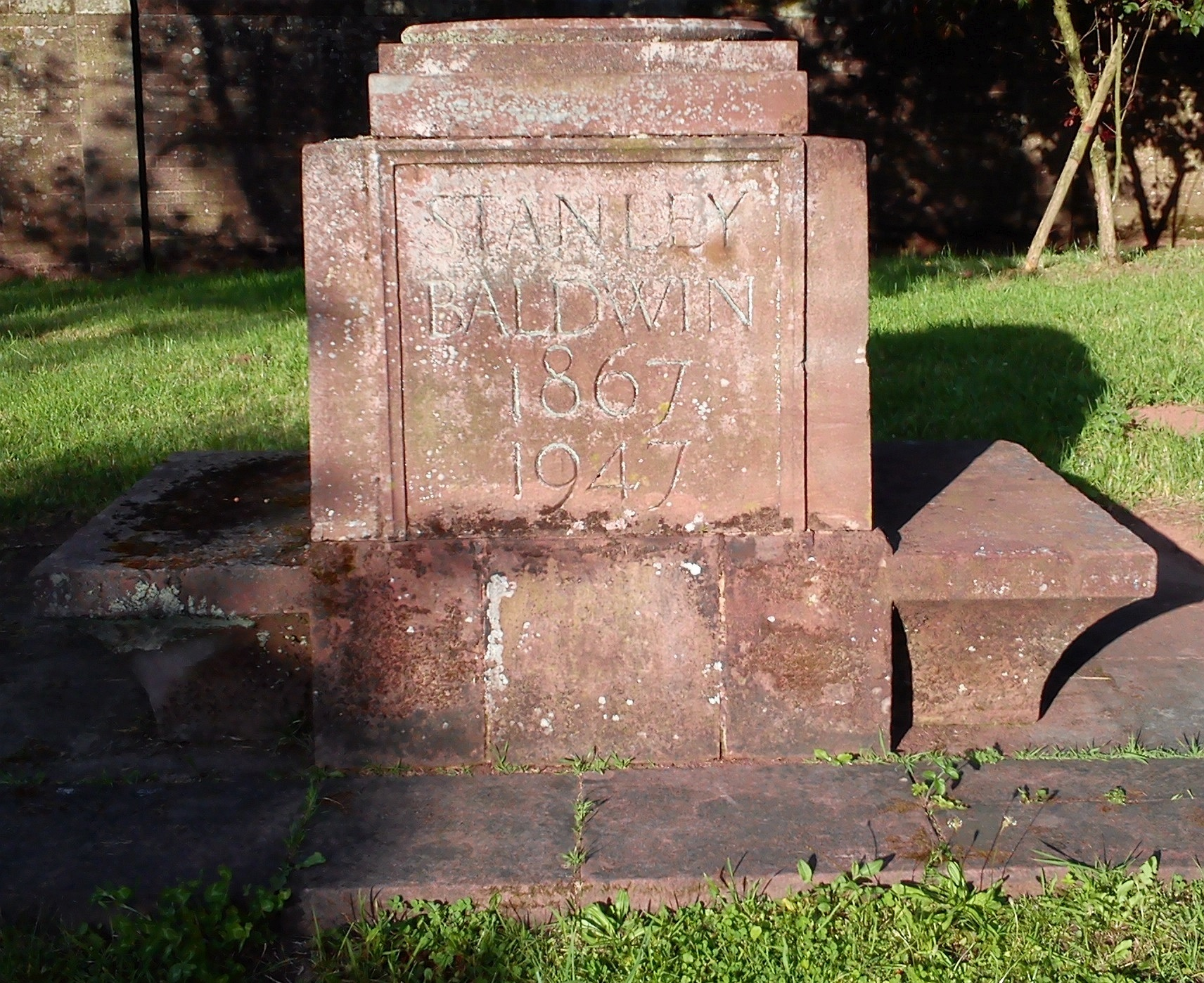
Memorial to Stanley Baldwin near his home, Astley Hall

Astley is a village, and a civil parish (with Dunley) in the Malvern Hills district, in Worcestershire, England, about two miles outside Stourport-on-Severn and seven miles south-west of Kidderminster.

A range of English white wines including sparkling wines have been produced in Astley since 1983. The wines have won over 100 awards, and are now Quality Wine status, three of which have received International Wine and Spirit Competition (IWSC) awards.

== History ==
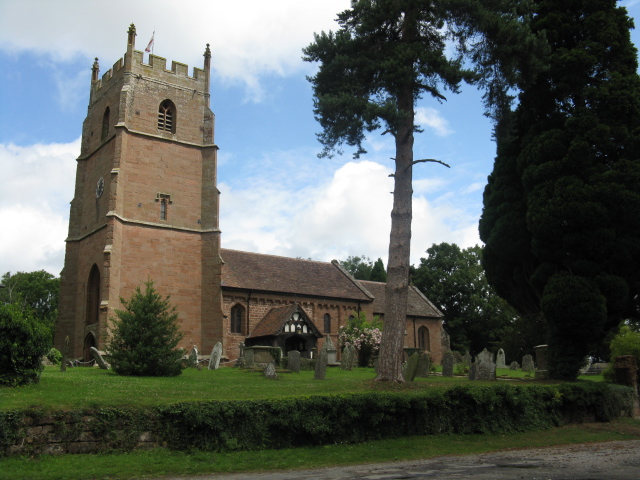
St Peter's Church, Astley

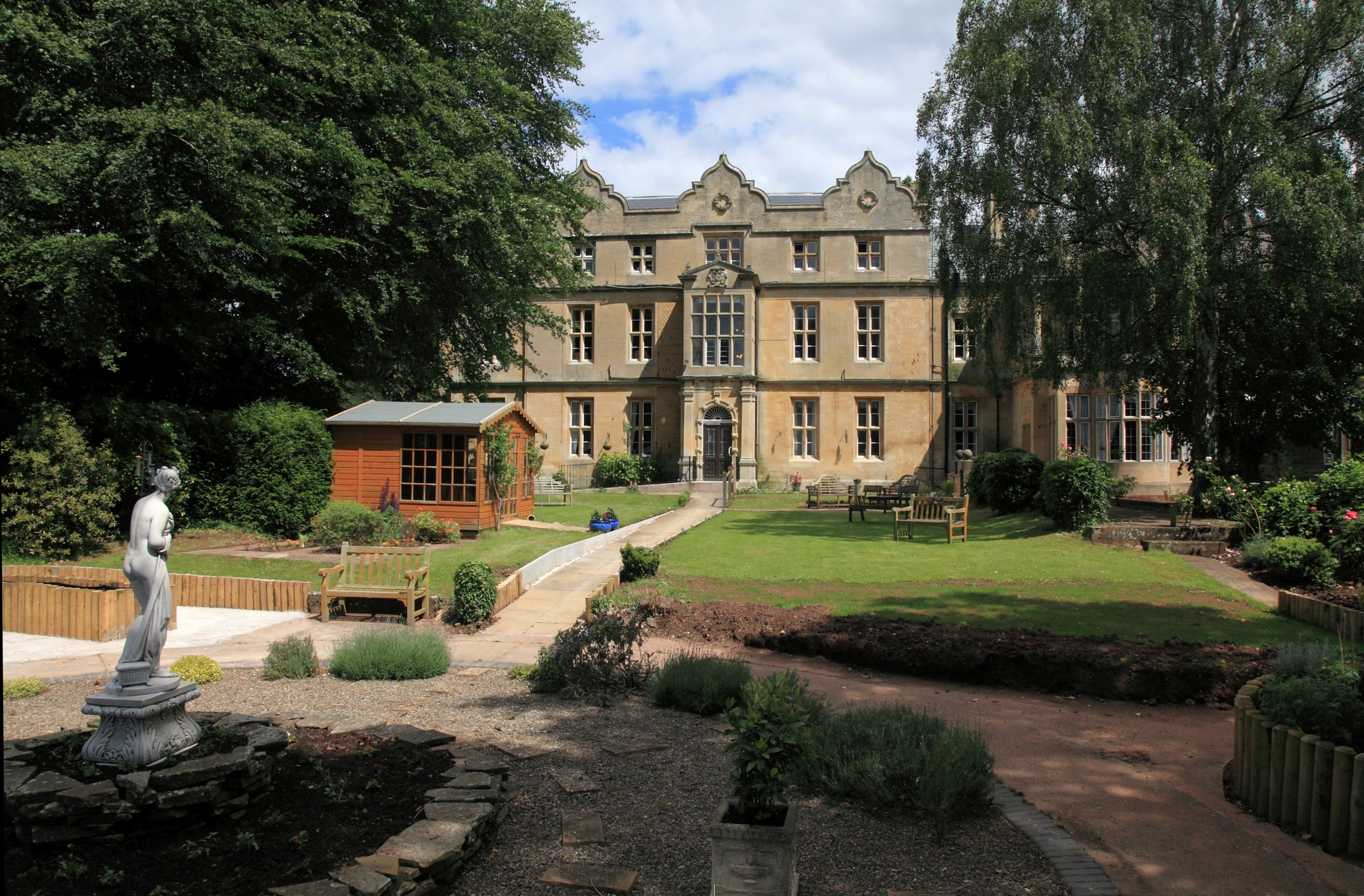
Astley Hall, Stanley Baldwin's home between 1902 and 1947

The name Astley derives from the Old English ēastlēah meaning 'east wood/clearing'.

There is evidence in the village of Norman heritage. The house Astley Towne has a Norman cellar.

Near St Peter's Church are the remains of a priory built in 1088. The priory was founded by Ralph de Todeni who was given the manor of Eastlie (Astley) following the Norman conquest of England. It was an alien Benedictine House, belonging to a parent monastery in Normandy. The prior's well remains, but is overgrown. To the East of the priory, well-defined earthworks of a medieval village have been found.

Astley was in the lower division of Doddingtree Hundred.

Following the Poor Law Amendment Act 1834 Astley Parish ceased to be responsible for maintaining the poor in its parish. This responsibility was transferred to Martley Poor Law Union.

St Peter's church is of possible c12 century origins although its origins may have been based on an existing priory.

There are several memorials within the church to the Winford family.

== Education ==
Astley Primary School is a small, rural CoE Voluntary Aided school with about eighty pupils between 4 and 11 years old. A free school was first established in Astley in 1729, endowed by the will of Mercy Pope. The present school was built in 1893.

Although the school is isolated, it is popular with children travelling some distance each day. On leaving Astley school the 11 to 16s go on to The Chantry School at Martley.

== Facilities ==
Astley Burf contains an Outdoor Education centre, owned by Dudley Council, and used by Dudley schools during the spring and summer

== Glasshampton ==
Glasshampton means the home of clear water.

Glasshampton was a separate manor from Astley, but like Astley, was in the lower division of Doddingtree Hundred.

The manor of Glasshampton and its associated estate was held by the Winford family.

The house was said to contain 365 windows but was burnt down in 1917. The stable block survived and was converted in 1918 to accommodate a monastery for the Anglican Franciscan order.

== Notable people ==
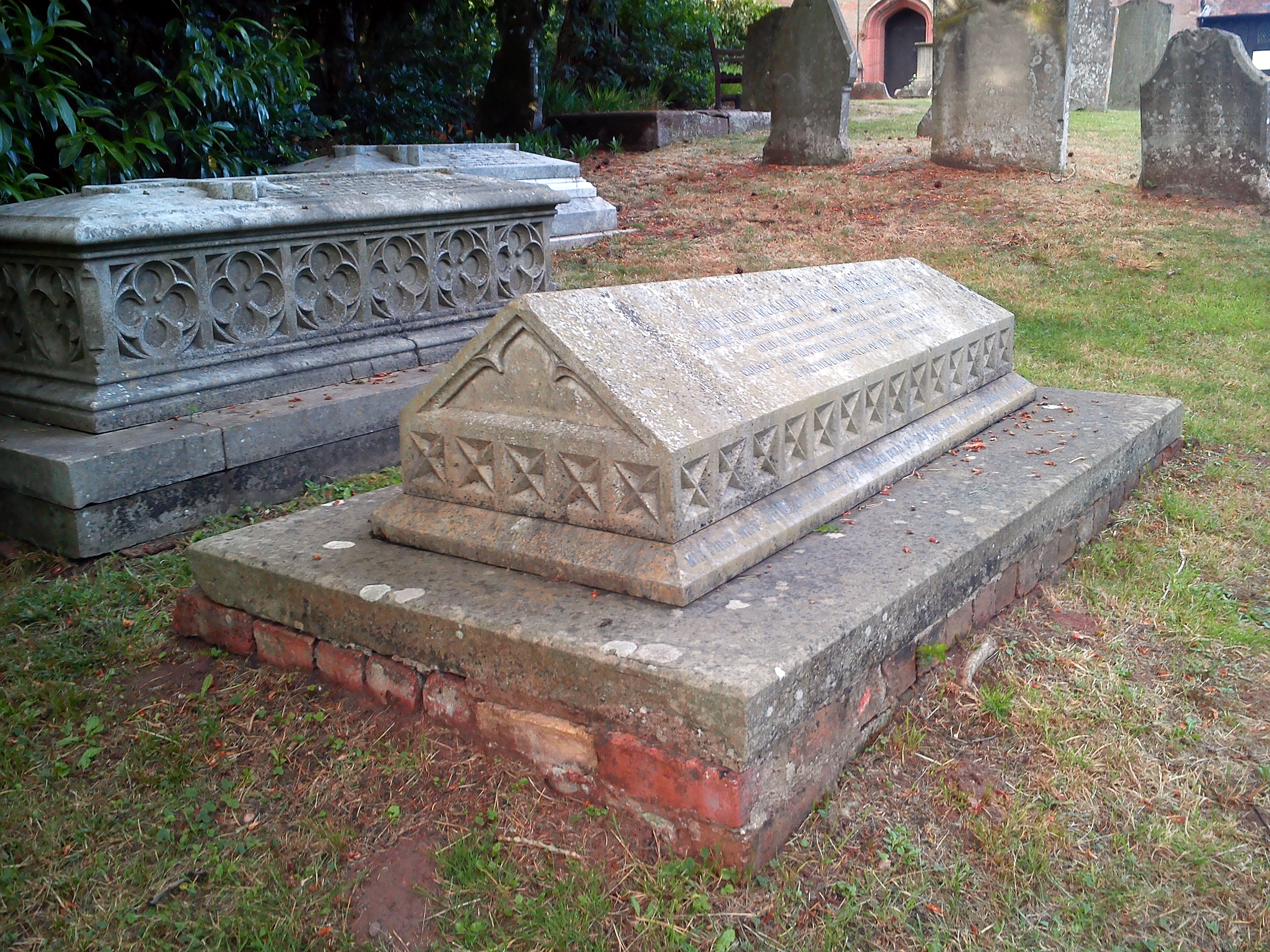
Astley, St Peter's Church: grave of Frances Ridley Havergal (1836–1879), and of her father William Henry Havergal (1793–1870)

- Frances Ridley Havergal (1836–1879), poet and hymnist was born in the village, the youngest daughter of William Henry Havergal, the Rector of Astley. Both are buried at Astley.
- Major General Hill Wallace, CB (1823–1899), former officer commanding the Royal Horse Artillery, buried at Astley.
- Former Prime Minister, Stanley Baldwin lived at Astley Hall in his later years. His home has now become a nursing home. There is also a monument dedicated to him on the main road between Holt and Stourport. After Baldwin's death, a national appeal failed to raise sufficient money for this memorial. Winston Churchill personally made up the shortfall and attended the dedication of the memorial.
- Winford baronets, of Glasshampton
- Captain Andrew Yarranton, engineer and agriculturalist

== See also ==
- Astley Cross
- Areley Kings
- Astley Hall
- Pool House
- Brown, P (1982) ‘The early industrial complex at Astley, Worcestershire’, Post-Medieval Archaeology,16, pp 1–19.
