= Holy Cross, Worcestershire =

Hamlet in Worcestershire, England

Coordinates: 52.40749°N 2.11438°W

Holy Cross
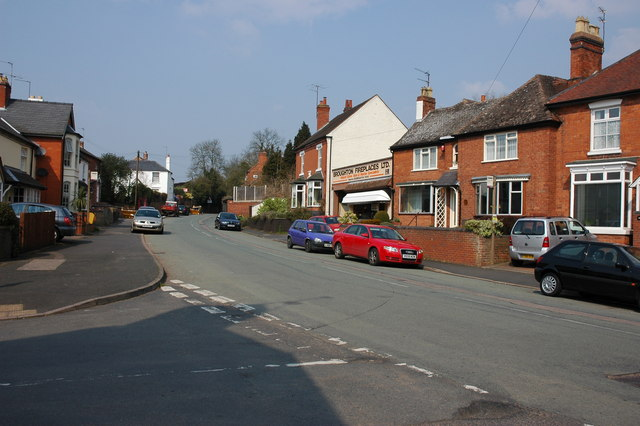

- Location within Worcestershire
- OS grid reference: SO923788
- Civil parish: Clent
- District: Bromsgrove
- Shire county: Worcestershire
- Region: West Midlands
- Country: England
- Sovereign state: United Kingdom
- Post town: STOURBRIDGE
- Postcode district: DY9
- Police: West Mercia
- Fire: Hereford and Worcester
- Ambulance: West Midlands
- UK Parliament: Bromsgrove

Holy Cross is one of five hamlets in village of Clent in the county of Worcestershire, England. The hamlet consists of housing apart from the Bell and Cross public house, Clent Parish Hall and Clent Primary School.

== History ==
A converted barn was the Roman Catholic Church of St Wulstan and St Oswald from 1926 until 2012.

The cutting through nearby Button Hill through which the main road between Stourbridge and Bromsgrove used to pass was constructed as part of the poor relief and opened in 1834.
