= Longdon, Worcestershire =

Village in Worcestershire, England

Coordinates: 52.024006°N 2.236856°W

Longdon
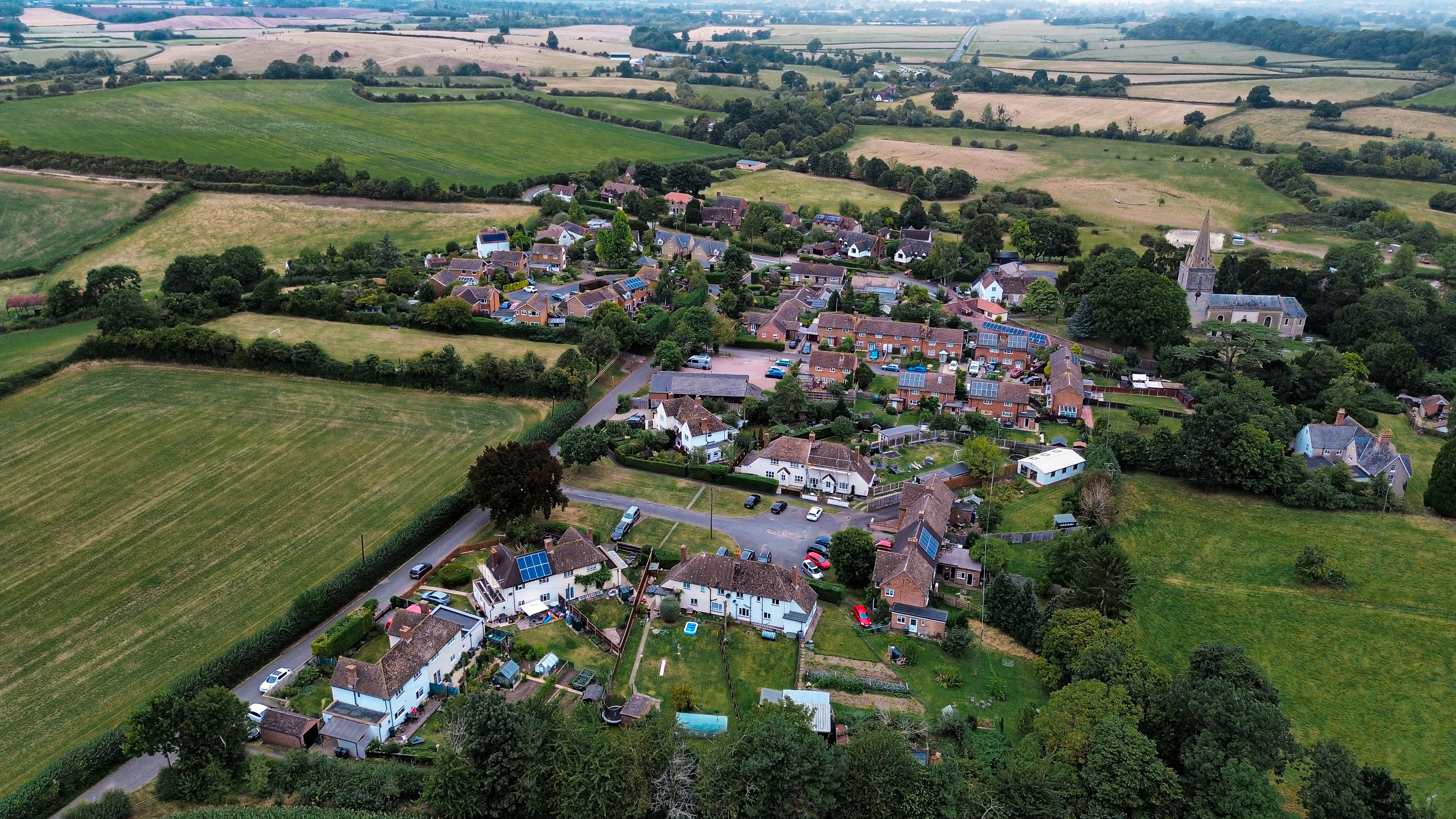
- Aerial view of Longdon village

- Location within Worcestershire
- OS grid reference: SO837362
- District: Malvern Hills
- Shire county: Worcestershire
- Region: West Midlands
- Country: England
- Sovereign state: United Kingdom
- Post town: TEWKESBURY
- Postcode district: GL20
- Dialling code: 01684
- Police: West Mercia
- Fire: Hereford and Worcester
- Ambulance: West Midlands
- UK Parliament: West Worcestershre

Longdon is a village and a civil parish in the Malvern Hills District and council ward of the county of Worcestershire, England and lies about 5 km (3 miles) south of Upton-on-Severn. It is jointly administered with two other parishes by Longdon, Queenhill and Holdfast Parish Council.

== Parish Church ==
The Church of St. Mary stands within the village.

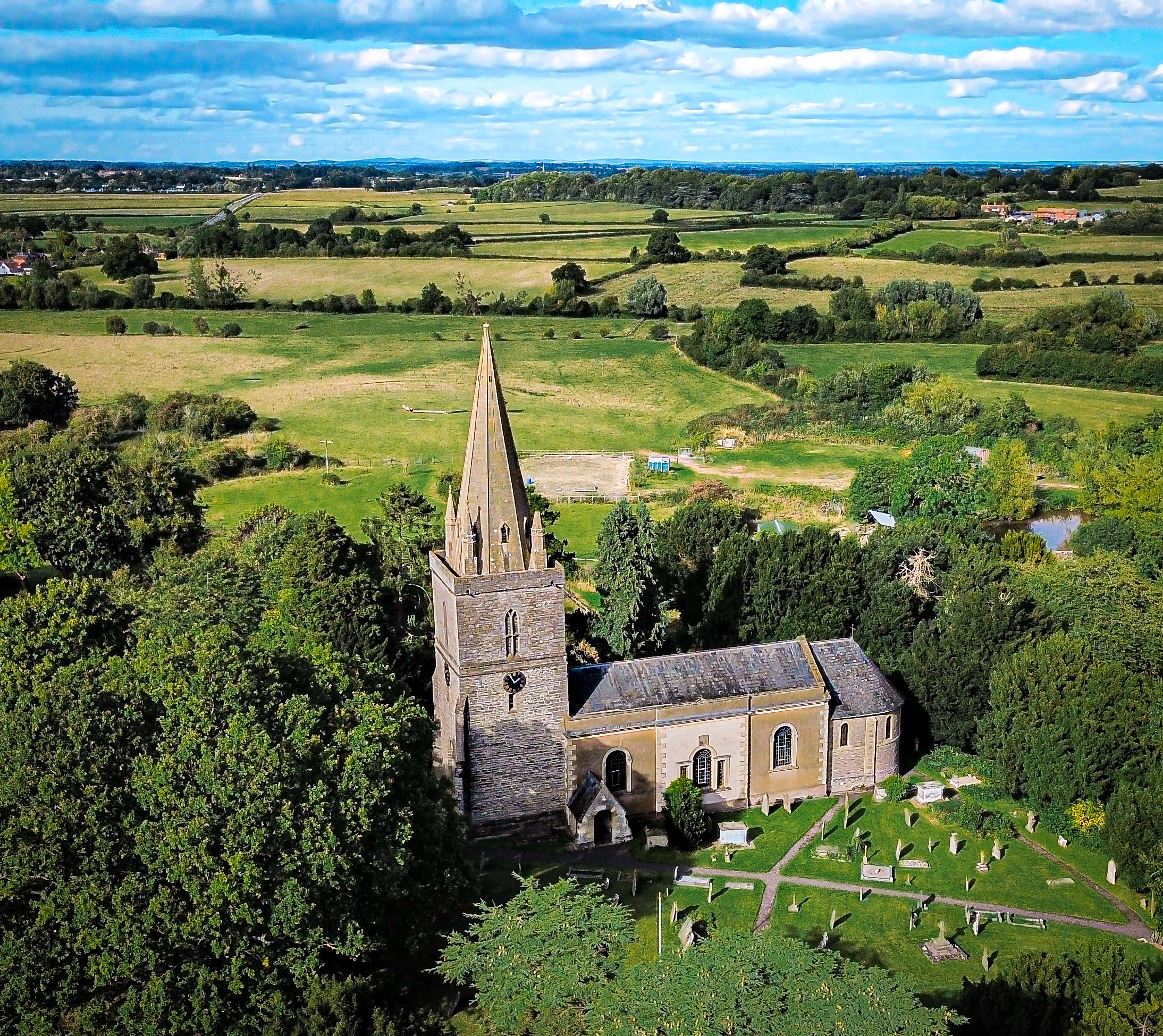
Longdon Church GL20

== Village Hall and Green ==
The Village Hall and Village Green are administered by a single Trust.

== Marshland and nature reserve ==
Longdon Marsh is an area of flat land spreading into neighbouring Eldersfield, now mostly drained for agriculture. The Worcestershire Wildlife Trust owns and maintains the Hill Court Farm & The Blacklands flagship nature reserve on an area of former marshland within Longdon and aims to restore it to its former wetland state.
