= Francis Tebbs Havergal =

British writer and editor

- Born: 27 August 1829
- Died: 27 July 1890 (aged 60); Upton, U.K.
- Father: William Henry Havergal
- Relatives: Frances Ridley Havergal (sister)

Francis Tebbs Havergal (27 August 1829 – 27 July 1890) was a British writer and editor.

Havergal was the youngest son of William Henry Havergal and Jane Head Havergal. He was a bible-clerk of New College, Oxford (B.A. 1852, M.A. 1857); he became vicar-choral in Hereford Cathedral, 1853–1874, vicar of Pipe and Lyde, 1861–74, and of Upton Bishop, 1874–90, and prebendary of Hereford, 1877–90.

His younger sister was the prolific Christian poet Frances Ridley Havergal.

He married Isabel Susan Martin. He died at Upton on 27 July 1890.

== Publications ==
- The Visitor's Hand Guide to Hereford Cathedral, 1869; 6th ed. 1882.
- Fasti Herefordenses, 1869.
- Monumental Inscriptions in Hereford Cathedral, 1881.
- Records of Upton Bishop, 1883.
- Herefordshire Words and Phrases, 1887.
- Memorials of the Rev. Sir Frederick Arthur Gore Ouseley, Baronet, 1889.
