= Shell, Worcestershire =

Hamlet in Worcestershire, England

Coordinates: 52.2349°N 2.0725°W

Shell
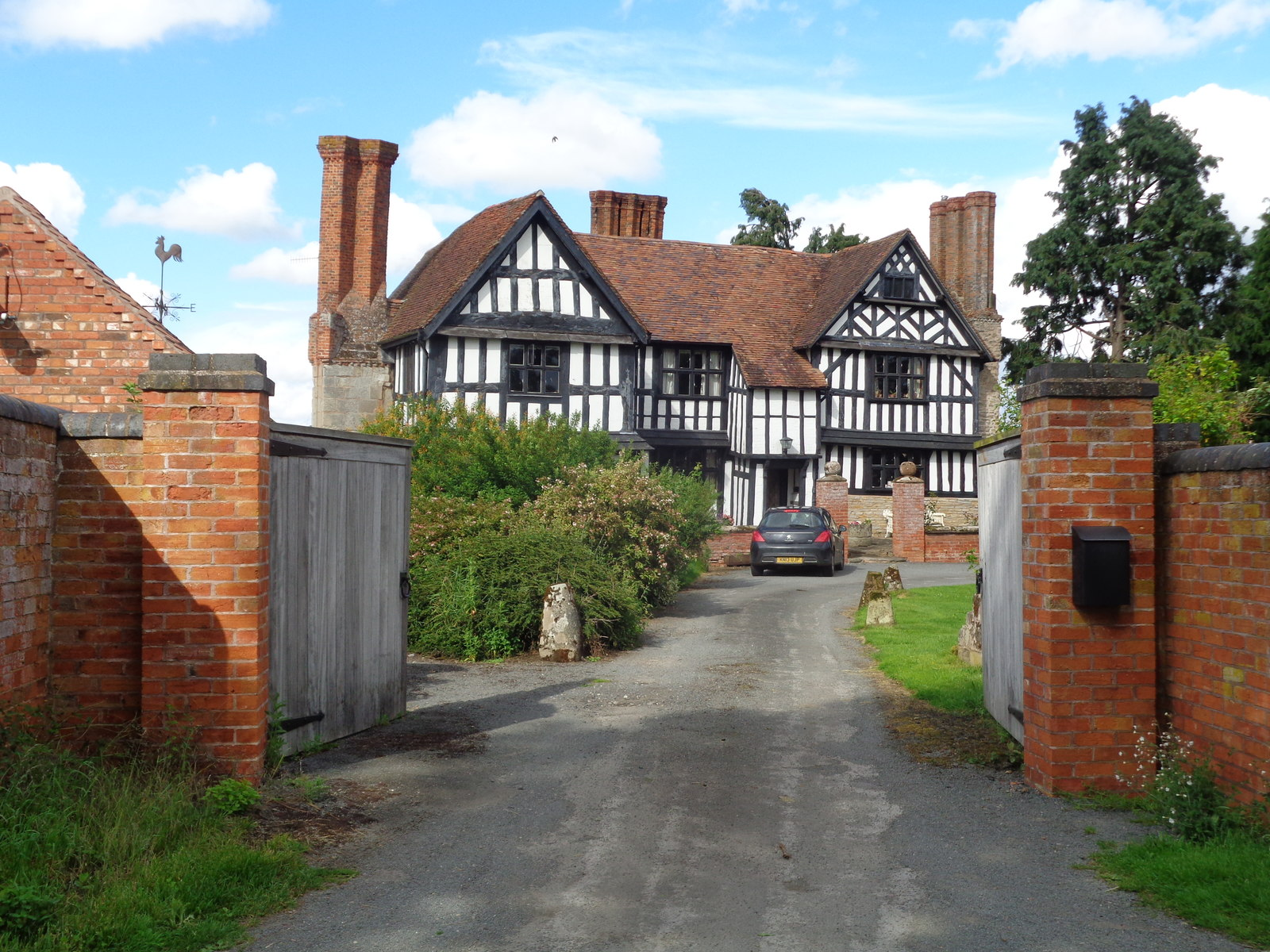
- Shell Manor

- Location within Worcestershire
- Civil parish: Himbleton
- District: Wychavon
- Shire county: Worcestershire
- Region: West Midlands
- Country: England
- Sovereign state: United Kingdom

Shell is a hamlet in the civil parish of Himbleton, in the Wychavon district, in the county of Worcestershire, England. It is 7 miles from Worcester. In 1881 the parish had a population of 38.

== History ==
The name "Shell" means 'Shelf'. Shell was recorded in the Domesday Book as Scelves. Shell was formerly an extra-parochial tract, in 1858 Shell became a separate civil parish, on 25 March 1884 the parish was abolished and merged with Himbleton.

== Buildings ==
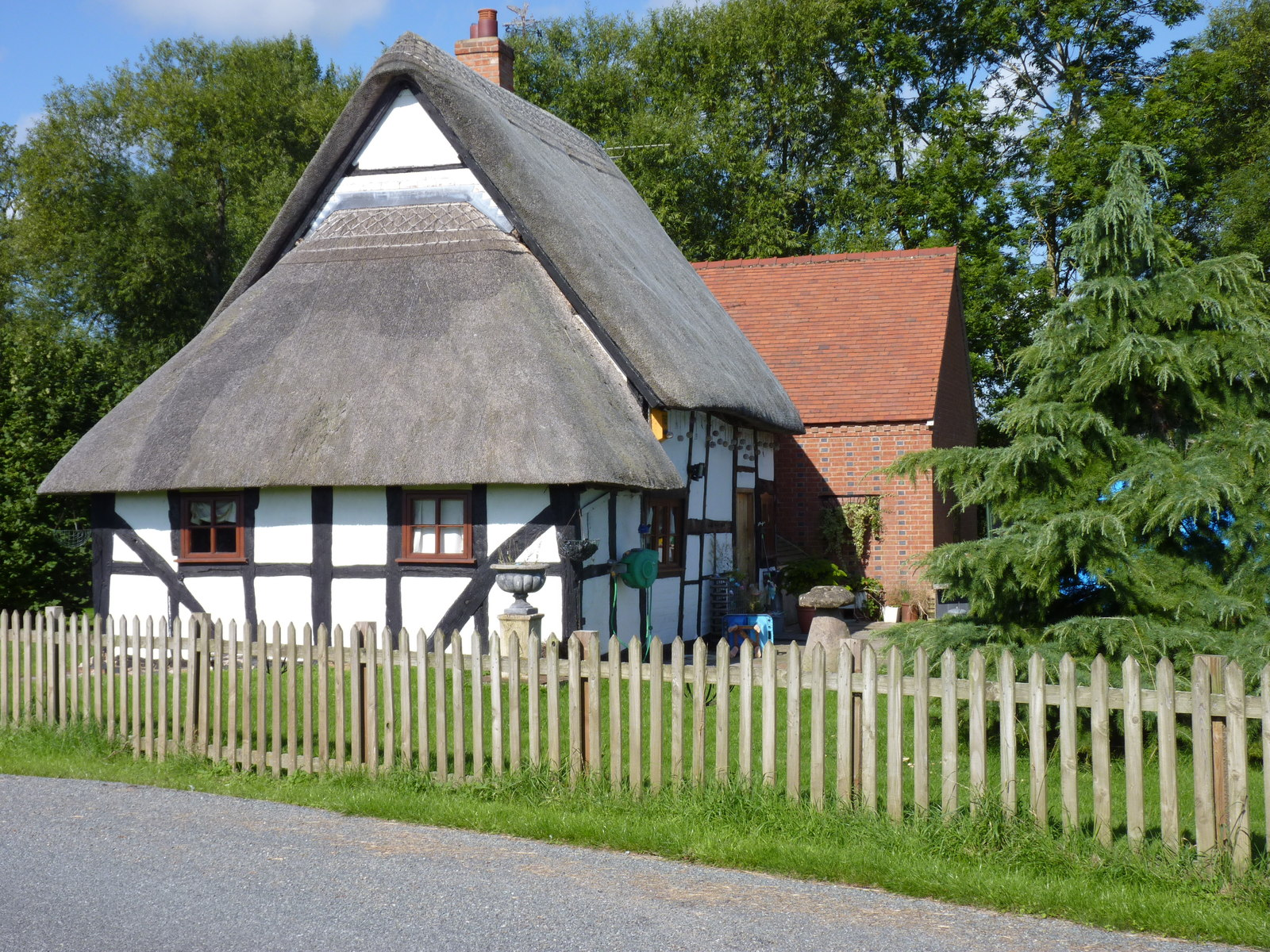
Shell Cottage

There is Shell Cottage which is Grade II* listed, "Packhorse Bridge About 100 Yards South of Shell Manor" which is Grade II listed, Shell Mill Farmhouse which is Grade II listed.

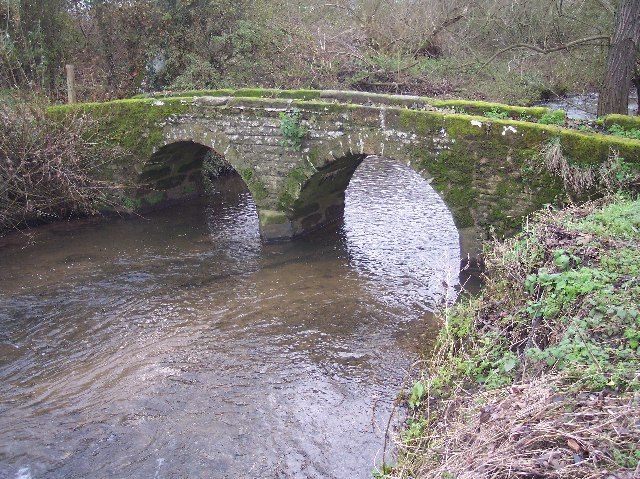
Packhorse Bridge

Shell Manor is Grade II* listed, around it there is "Gate Piers And Front Wall to Shell Manor" which is Grade II listed, "Former barn and granary about 27 metres south of Shell Manor" which is Grade II listed, and "Barn About 35 Yards North-West of Shell Manor" which is also Grade II listed.
