= Naunton, Worcestershire =

Village in Worcestershire, England

Coordinates: 52.0542°N 2.178605°W

Naunton
- Location within Worcestershire
- OS grid reference: SO878395
- Civil parish: Ripple
- District: Malvern Hills
- Shire county: Worcestershire
- Region: West Midlands
- Country: England
- Sovereign state: United Kingdom
- Post town: Worcester
- Postcode district: WR8
- Dialling code: 01684
- Police: West Mercia
- Fire: Hereford and Worcester
- Ambulance: West Midlands
- UK Parliament: West Worcestershire

Naunton is a village in the parish of Ripple, near Upton-upon-Severn in Worcestershire, England.

Records for Naunton date back to the 12th Century, where Naunton was known as Newentone, before changing to Nounton in the 13th Century. It was given by Bishop Theulf (1115–23) to Auda 'Vitrarius'. It was then bought by Adam de Croome around 1125–1150, becoming part of the Earls Croome estate. It subsequently became part of the Ripple parish.

Naunton is predominantly residential, with a mix of old farm cottages and new bungalows. Buildings of note include the Grade II listed Naunton Farmhouse, and The Thatch.
