= Lydiate Ash =

Location
- Lydiate Ash, Worcestershire
- Coordinates: 52.37859°N 2.04657°W
- Roads at junction: M5; A38; A491

Construction
- Type: Roundabout interchange
- Maintained by: National Highways

Location in Worcestershire
Location in UK motorway network

Lydiate Ash is a hamlet in North Worcestershire, England, consisting of a few houses, the road gritting and works depot for Worcestershire County Council and the gritting depot for National Highways. It is in the district of Bromsgrove, to the south-west of Birmingham.

The site is now best known for the Lydiate Ash roundabout, where the A38 and A491 main roads connect to the M5 motorway at the latter's junction 4.
