= Frith Common =

Village in Worcestershire, England

Coordinates: 52.325091°N 2.452741°W

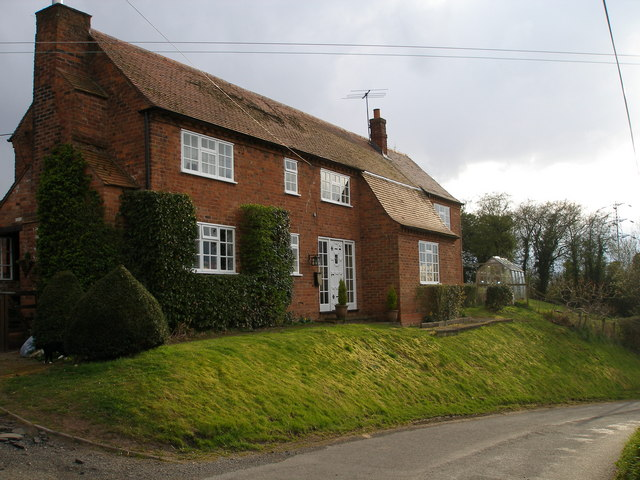
- Yew Tree Cottage

- Location within Worcestershire
- Civil parish: Lindridge
- District: Malvern Hills
- Shire county: Worcestershire
- Region: West Midlands
- Country: England
- Sovereign state: United Kingdom
- Post town: TENBURY WELLS
- Postcode district: WR15
- Police: West Mercia
- Fire: Hereford and Worcester
- Ambulance: West Midlands

Frith Common is a village in Worcestershire, England.

Frith Common is a village on the north side of the Teme valley, in the parish of Lindridge. It consists of less than sixty houses which encircle a mixed woodland. The parish of Lindridge had a population of 760 in 2021.
