= William Henry Havergal =

English hymnwriter

William Henry Havergal (18 January 1793 – 19 April 1870) was an Anglican clergyman, writer, composer and hymnwriter, and a publisher of sermons and pamphlets. He was the father of the hymn-writer and poet Frances Ridley Havergal and the clergyman and organist Henry East Havergal (1820–1875).

Havergal was born in High Wycombe in Buckinghamshire and educated at the Merchant Taylors' School and St Edmund Hall, Oxford, where he gained a BA in 1815 and an MA in 1819. He was ordained deacon in 1816 and priest in 1817, and became rector of Astley in Worcestershire in 1829, St. Nicholas, Worcester in 1842, and perpetual curate of Shareshill near Wolverhampton in 1860. He died at Leamington Spa, Warwickshire and is buried at Astley.

== Early life ==
Havergal, only son of William Havergal, who died 2 September 1854, by Mary, daughter of Thomas Hopkins, was born at Chipping Wycombe, Buckinghamshire, on 18 January 1793; commenced his education at Princes Risborough in 1801, and entered the Merchant Taylors' School in July 1806. During his holidays he cultivated music, and from the age of fourteen often played the organ in his parish church. He was originally intended for the medical profession, but eventually went to Oxford, matriculating from St Edmund Hall on 10 July 1812. He graduated BA 1816, MA 1819, and was ordained 24 March 1816.

He became an assistant curate under Thomas Tregenna Biddulph, at the churches of St. James, Bristol, and Creech Heathfield. In June 1820 he became curate in charge of Coaley, Gloucestershire, and lecturer of Dursley, and took pupils. On 25 June 1822 he became curate of Astley, Worcestershire. He visited Cornwall and Yorkshire in 1826 and two following years as a deputation from the Church Missionary Society.

== Music ==
On 14 June 1829 he was thrown out of a carriage and received concussion of the brain, which disabled him for some years. He found relief in music. His first public composition was an anthem-like setting of Reginald Heber's From Greenland's Icy Mountains, the proceeds of which (180 pounds) he devoted to the Church Missionary Society. In 1836 appeared Op. 36, An Evening Service in E flat and One Hundred Antiphonal Chants. One of these, a Recte et Retro chant in C, sometimes called Worcester chant, became very widely known. In the same year the Gresham prize medal was awarded him for an Evening Service in A, Op. 37. In 1841 a second medal was gained by an anthem, Give Thanks, Op. 40.

He became well known by his exertions for the restoration of metrical psalmody to its original purity. He published in 1844 a reprint of Thomas Ravenscroft's scarce work, "The Whole Booke of Psalmes". In 1847 he brought out the "Old Church Psalmody", Op. 43, which is the parent of most modern collections of church hymn tunes. "A Hundred Psalm and Hymn Tunes", Op. 48, entirely his own composition, was published in 1859. Handel and Corelli were his models, and his aim was to preserve purity of style.

He also wrote songs, rounds, and catches for the young, besides carols, hymns, and sacred songs, for which he composed both words and music. Many of the sacred songs and carols appeared in the earlier volumes of "Our Own Fireside", and were republished under the title of "Fireside Music". His sacred song Summer Tide is Coming and his psalm tune "Evan" are widely known.

On 13 November 1829 he was presented to the rectory of Astley, whence he removed in June 1845 to St. Nicholas rectory, Worcester, and was soon after appointed an honorary canon of Worcester Cathedral. He all but lost his sight in 1832, and it was never entirely restored. For a long time he could not read printed music or decipher his own handwriting.

== Final years and death ==
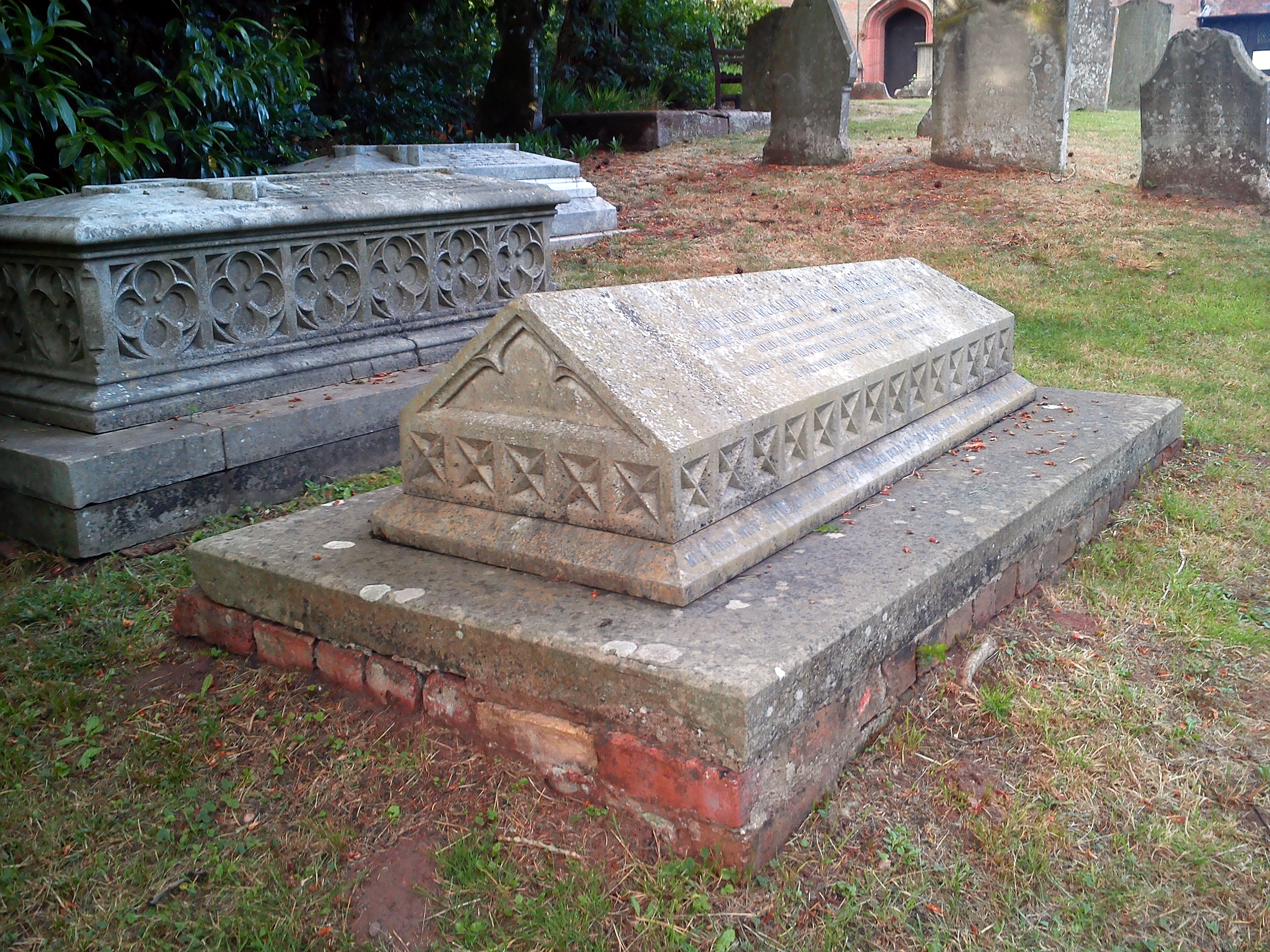
Astley, Worcestershire, St Peter's Church: grave of Frances Ridley Havergal (1836–1879), and of her father William Henry Havergal (1793–1870)

Through weakened health in March 1860 he resigned St. Nicholas and was presented to the country vicarage of Shareshill, near Wolverhampton. In 1867 increasing infirmities forced him to lay aside all regular parish work and remove to Leamington, where, with the exception of visits to the continent, he continued to reside. He died at Pyrmont Villa, Binswood Terrace, Leamington, on 19 April 1870, and was buried at Astley on 23 April.

== Legacy ==
Havergal was the author of:

1. A Good and Satisfied Old Age. Some account of George Vaughan, a sermon, 1847.
2. Death for Murder, the Doctrine of the Holy Scriptures, 1849.
3. Sermons, chiefly on Historical Subjects, from the Old and New Testament, 1853, 2 vols.
4. A History of the Old Hundredth Psalm Tune, with specimens, 1854; in which work he attempted to prove that William Franc was the composer.
5. A Wise and Holy Child. An account of E. Edwards. 1855.
6. The Faithful Servant. Two sermons on the death of the Rev. J. East, 1856.
7. Six Lectures on the Ark of the Covenant, (London: Hamilton, Adams And Co, 1867). Available on Google Books.
8. Pyrmont, an eligible place for English patients who require chalybeate or saline waters, edited by Mrs. C. A. Havergal, 1871.

He also wrote, selected, harmonised, and arranged, upwards of thirty works and pieces of music, notably the tune Franconia (hymn tune) for the hymn 'Blest are the pure in heart' (New English Hymnal 341).

== Wives and children ==
He married (1), 2 May 1816, Jane, fifth daughter of William Head of East Grinstead—she died 5 July 1848; and (2), on 29 July 1851, Caroline Ann, daughter of John Cooke of Gloucester—she died 26 May 1878. His children, Henry East Havergal, Francis Tebbs Havergal and Frances Ridley Havergal, are separately noticed. Another daughter, Maria Vernon Graham Havergal, who died 22 June 1887, wrote several books, and an autobiography which was edited by her sister, Jane Miriam Havergal, who married, October 1842, Henry Crane. Mrs. Crane also published records of her father's life.

== Archives ==
Archives related to Havergal, including his music notebook and family papers, are held at the Cadbury Research Library, University of Birmingham.
