= List of settlements in Worcestershire by population =

Worcestershire's 13 largest settlements. The main administrative centre is in bold and district centres in yellow.

This is a list of settlements in Worcestershire by population based on the results of the 2021 census. The next United Kingdom census will take place in 2031. In 2021, there were 13 built-up area subdivisions with 5,000 or more inhabitants in Worcestershire, shown in the table below.

== Population ranking ==
#	Settlement	District	Population		
#	Settlement	District	2001	2011	2021
1	Worcester	City of Worcester	93,544	98,996	105,465
2	Redditch	Redditch	74,380	79,033	81,635
3	Kidderminster	Wyre Forest	55,349	55,247	57,560
4	Bromsgrove	Bromsgrove	29,464	33,339	34,755
5	Malvern	Malvern Hills	31,598	32,316	33,185
6	Evesham	Wychavon	22,536	23,679	28,250
7	Droitwich Spa	Wychavon	23,159	23,806	26,420
8	Stourport-on-Severn	Wyre Forest	19,381	19,890	20,305
9	Catshill	Bromsgrove	10,081	10,066	10,170
10	Bewdley	Wyre Forest	8,339	8,270	8,280
11	Pershore	Wychavon	7,104	6,873	8,210
12	Hagley	Bromsgrove	5,405	5,965	7,010
13	Hollywood	Bromsgrove	6,878	6,920	6,945

== See also ==
- Worcestershire
- List of towns and cities in England by population
