= Ripple, Worcestershire =

Village in Worcestershire, England

Coordinates: 52.038228°N 2.184712°W

Ripple
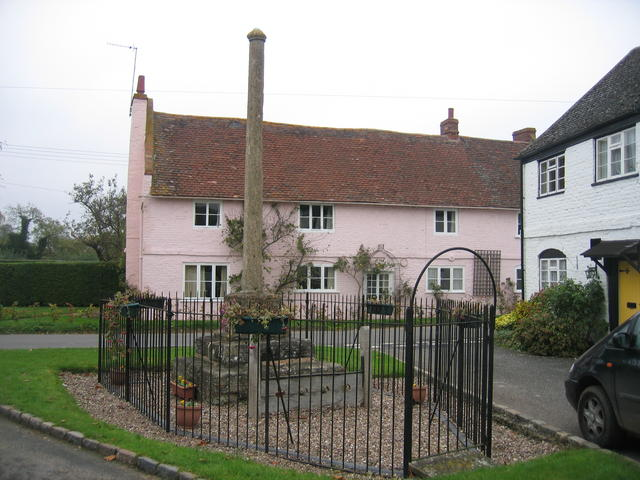
- Ripple Cross and Stocks

- Location within Worcestershire
- Population: 1,779
- OS grid reference: SO874377
- Civil parish: Ripple
- District: Malvern Hills
- Shire county: Worcestershire
- Region: West Midlands
- Country: England
- Sovereign state: United Kingdom
- Post town: TEWKESBURY
- Postcode district: GL20
- Police: West Mercia
- Fire: Hereford and Worcester
- Ambulance: West Midlands
- UK Parliament: West Worcestershire

Ripple is a village and civil parish in the county of Worcestershire, England. Ripple is one of the most southerly parishes in the county and is situated on the A38 road with the River Severn as its western boundary. Besides Ripple, the parish contains the settlements of Holly Green, The Grove, Naunton, Ryall, Saxon's Lode, and Uckinghall. It had a combined population of 1,799 at the 2011 census.

== History ==
The name Ripple derives from the Old English ripel meaning 'a strip of land'.

Ripple is mentioned in passing in the Domesday Book of 1086, under the entry of Upton upon Severn, as being "also held by the Bishop of Worcester". During the English Civil War Ripple was the site of a Royalist victory, the Battle of Ripple Field, on 13 April 1643. After an initial Parliamentarian attack by cavalry which was repulsed, the Parliamentarians retreated back into the village of Ripple. After a brief stand, they were eventually routed by the royalist cavalry of Prince Maurice (Maurice of the Palatinate).

St Mary's Church is a Grade I listed building with "exceptional" 15th-century stalls with 16 carved misericords.

=== Saxon's Lode ===
In the medieval era, Saxon's Lode developed as a manor within the parish of Ripple. By the late 12th century the manor was held by Jordan of Ryall, and during the 13th and 14th centuries it was held by the de la Lode family.

At Saxon's Lode, now a hamlet approximately 1 mile (1.6 km) north-west of Ripple village, there is archaeological evidence of human activity dating back to the Bronze Age, including a Romano-British farmstead and an Anglo-Saxon settlement. The Anglo-Saxon settlement is significant for being the most westerly of its type yet discovered in Great Britain.

=== Railways ===
Ripple railway station was on the Tewkesbury and Malvern Railway on the Midland Railway (later LMS) branch line from Ashchurch to Great Malvern, which ran via Tewkesbury, Ripple, Upton-upon-Severn and Malvern Wells. This was opened from Ashchurch as far as Tewkesbury on 21 July 1840 and extended to Malvern on 16 May 1864. It was closed beyond Upton-on-Severn railway station on 1 December 1952 and the rest (including Ripple) on 14 August 1961. Ripple station still stands, attractively restored, and is now a private house.

== Governance ==
Ripple is part of the West Worcestershire constituency of the Parliament of the United Kingdom. It forms part of the Coome ward of Worcestershire County Council, which elects one councillor. It is part of the Upton and Ripple ward of Malvern Hills District Council, and elects two members to the council; the ward consists of the parishes of Upton upon Severn, Ripple, Earls Croome and Hill Croome.

== See also ==
- Saxon's Lode
