= Alfred's Well, Worcestershire =

Coordinates: 52.3505°N 2.0822°W

Alfred's Well
- Location within Worcestershire
- OS grid reference: SO945725
- Civil parish: Dodford
- District: Bromsgrove
- Shire county: Worcestershire
- Region: West Midlands
- Country: England
- Sovereign state: United Kingdom
- Post town: BROMSGROVE
- Postcode district: B61
- Dialling code: 01527
- Police: West Mercia
- Fire: Hereford and Worcester
- Ambulance: West Midlands

Alfred's Well is a hamlet in the civil parish of Dodford in the Bromsgrove District of Worcestershire, England. Its nearest town is Bromsgrove.
