= Ted Besford =

Australian rules footballer, born 1915

Personal information
- Full name: Edward Besford
- Born: 28 June 1915; Northumberland, England
- Died: 12 July 1978 (aged 63); Thornbury, Victoria
- Original team: Wonthaggi
- Height: 170 cm (5 ft 7 in)
- Weight: 73 kg (161 lb)

Playing career^{1}
Years	Club	Games (Goals)
1939, 1941	Fitzroy	2 (0)
- ^{1} Playing statistics correct to the end of 1941.

Edward Besford (28 June 1915 – 12 July 1978) was an Australian rules footballer who played with Fitzroy in the Victorian Football League (VFL).

== Family ==
The son of David Besford (1897-1991), and Rhoda Besford (1896-1974), née Websell, Edward Besford was born in Northumberland, England on 28 June 1915. He emigrated to Australia with his family at age 10, initially settling in Wonthaggi.

He married Mavis Jenkins (1917-), at North Fitzroy on 13 December 1941.

== Cricket ==
He also played over 100 games of district cricket with Fitzroy and Carlton from 1937 to 1953.

== Football ==
He was cleared to Carlton from Fitzroy in July 1945.
