= Holdfast, Worcestershire =

Civil parish in Worcestershire, England

Coordinates: 52.03938°N 2.215537°W

Holdfast
- Location within Worcestershire
- OS grid reference: SO853378
- District: Malvern Hills
- Shire county: Worcestershire
- Region: West Midlands
- Country: England
- Sovereign state: United Kingdom
- Post town: Upton upon Severn
- Postcode district: WR8
- Police: West Mercia
- Fire: Hereford and Worcester
- Ambulance: West Midlands
- UK Parliament: West Worcestershire

Holdfast is a civil parish in the Malvern Hills District of the county of Worcestershire, England. It is one of three administered by the Parish Council of Longdon, Queenhill and Holdfast. It lies on the west bank of the River Severn immediately to the south of Upton upon Severn.

The name Holdfast derives from the Old English holfæsten meaning 'stronghold by a hole', or 'stronghold in a hollow'.
