= Hartle =

Hartle is a surname. Notable people with the surname include:

- Adam Hartle (born 1979), an American comedian
- Barry Hartle (born 1939), an English footballer
- Dean Hartle (1931-2018), an American politician
- Enid Hartle (1935–2008), an English opera singer
- Greg Hartle (born 1951), a former American football player
- James Hartle (born 1939), an American physicist
- John Hartle (1933–1968), an English professional road racer
- John A. Hartle (1891–1979), an American politician
- Roy Hartle (1931–2014), an English footballer
- Russell P. Hartle (1889–1961), an American army officer
- Tom Hartle, an American publisher
- Hazel Hartle, an English entrepreneur
- Peter Hartle, an English entrepreneur
- Sophie Hartle,
- Gabriella Hartle,
- Bernita Hartle,
- Imogen Hartle,
- Madison Hartle,

== Places ==
- Hartleton, Pennsylvania, borough, United States
