= Astley Cross =

Village in Worcestershire, England

Coordinates: 52.324822°N 2.292581°W

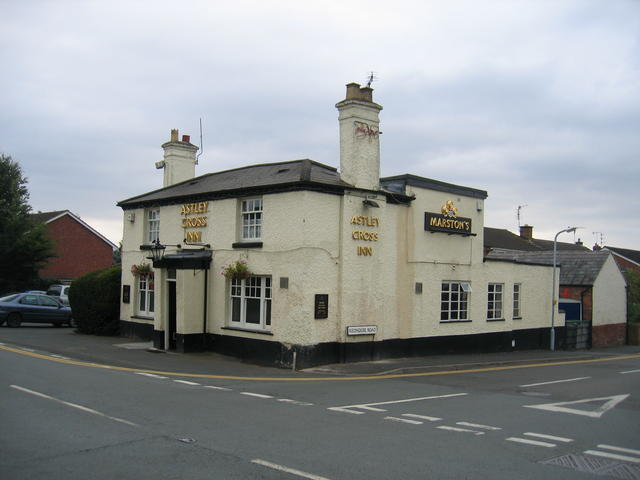
- The Astley Cross Inn

- Location within Worcestershire
- OS grid reference: SO801696
  - London: 109 miles (175 km)
- Civil parish: Stourport-on-Severn
- District: Wyre Forest
- Shire county: Worcestershire
- Region: West Midlands
- Country: England
- Sovereign state: United Kingdom
- Post town: STOURPORT-ON-SEVERN
- Postcode district: DY13
- Dialling code: 01299
- Police: West Mercia
- Fire: Hereford and Worcester
- Ambulance: West Midlands

Astley Cross is a village in Worcestershire, England, located on the outskirts of Stourport-on-Severn. The village lies 1 mile (1.6 km) south of the centre of Stourport, just east of Dunley and southeast of Areley Kings. The village of Astley Cross lies on Areley Common (B4196), a thoroughfare connecting Stourport to Holt Heath.

== History ==
The locality of Astley Cross was mentioned at least as early as 1854, when John Noake described the area in the third volume of his work, The Rambler in Worcestershire. Noake described the landmarks, houses, bridges, and roads in the area, including Redstone Lane (which still exists). Noake believed that the body of Arthur, Prince of Wales had been brought through the area on Areley Common upon the prince's death in 1502.

In 1900, the Incorporated Church Building Society granted the village of Astley Cross moneys to build a mission church. Today, Astley Cross is the site of the Astley Cross Inn.
