= Crowcroft =

Hamlet in Worcestershire, England

Coordinates: 52.14993°N 2.34297°W

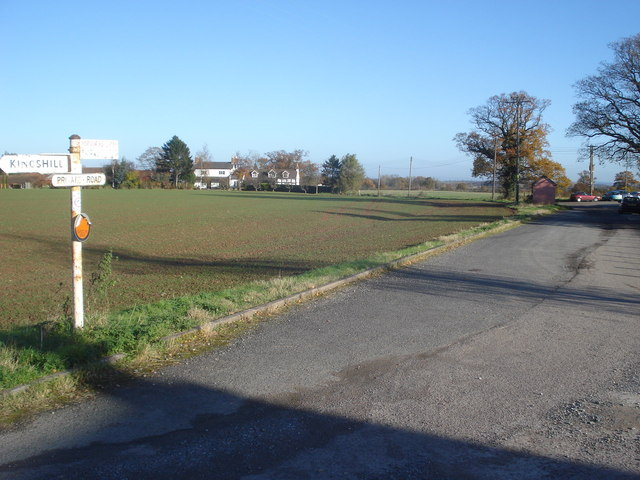
- Junction at Crowcroft

- Location within Worcestershire
- Civil parish: Leigh
- District: Malvern Hills
- Shire county: Worcestershire
- Region: West Midlands
- Country: England
- Sovereign state: United Kingdom
- UK Parliament: West Worcestershire

Crowcroft is a small hamlet just outside Leigh Sinton, in the civil parish of Leigh, in the Malvern Hills district, in the county of Worcestershire, England. In 2021, the parish of Leigh recorded a population of 1,589. The main industry for the area is fruit growing, particularly for local cider and perry businesses. Crowcroft has been the site of a traditional annual bonfire for many years.

== Politics ==
Crowcroft is part of the West Worcestershire constituency for elections to the House of Commons of the United Kingdom.
