= Lindridge =

Village in Worcestershire, England

Coordinates: 52.317255°N 2.477618°W

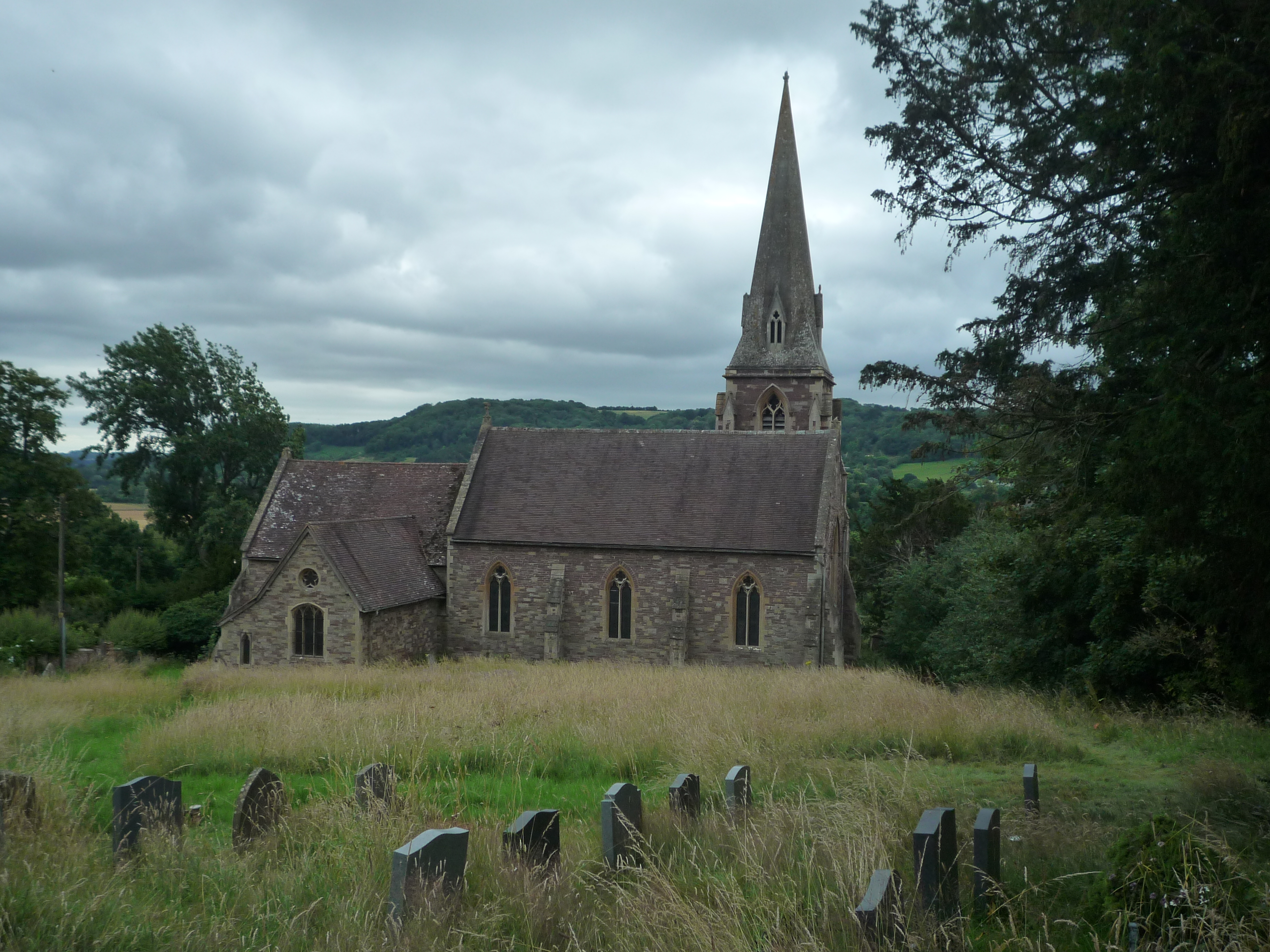
- St. Lawrence's church

- Location within Worcestershire
- Population: 760 (2021)
- OS grid reference: SO675688
- Civil parish: Lindridge
- District: Malvern Hills
- Shire county: Worcestershire
- Region: West Midlands
- Country: England
- Sovereign state: United Kingdom
- Post town: TENBURY WELLS
- Postcode district: WR15
- Police: West Mercia
- Fire: Hereford and Worcester
- Ambulance: West Midlands
- UK Parliament: West Worcestershire

Lindridge is a village and civil parish in the Malvern Hills District in the north of the county of Worcestershire, England, near the Shropshire border and the town of Tenbury Wells. The parish is extensive, and includes the hamlets of Eardiston, Lindridge, and Frith Common. The area around the village is known for its extensive hop fields. The civil parish population was 760 at the 2021 census.

== History ==
The area around Lindridge has been occupied since prehistoric times. During the 19th century a Bronze Age stone bracer was found while digging gravel in the parish, and field names like 'Blacklands Meadow' may reflect occupation in the Roman period.

During the early medieval period Lindridge lay within the hundred of Doddingtree, but by 1275 it was transferred to the hundred of Oswaldslow. Its place name originates in this period, and means 'lime tree ridge'.

The medieval manor of Lindridge was held by the monks of Worcester Priory, who reputedly held land in the parish since the 8th century. Place names, some of which are documented from the 13th century onwards, suggest that the manor was farmed using an open-field system.

The Grade II listed church of St Lawrence was built in 1860-1, but occupies the site of an earlier medieval church.
