= Queenhill =

Hamlet in Worcestershire, England

Coordinates: 52.03074°N 2.208638°W

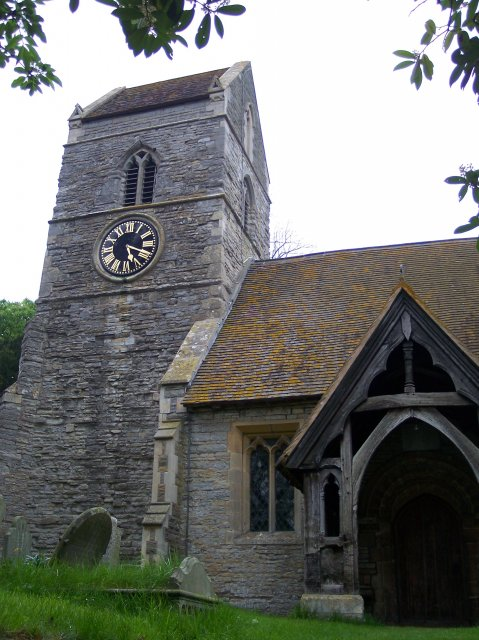
- Church of St. Nicholas

- Location within Worcestershire
- OS grid reference: SO858369
- District: Malvern Hills District
- Shire county: Worcestershire
- Region: West Midlands
- Country: England
- Sovereign state: United Kingdom
- Post town: Worcester
- Postcode district: WR8
- Police: West Mercia
- Fire: Hereford and Worcester
- Ambulance: West Midlands
- UK Parliament: West Worcestershire

Queenhill is a civil parish and hamlet in the Malvern Hills District of the county of Worcestershire, England. It is one of three parishes administered by the Parish Council of Longdon, Queenhill and Holdfast.

== Parish church ==
The church, which is dedicated to St Nicholas, serves both Queenhill and Holdfast.
