= Winford baronets =

Extinct baronetcy in the Baronetage of England

Arms of Winford of Glasshampton

The Winford Baronetcy, of Glasshampton in the County of Worcester, was a title in the Baronetage of England. It was created on 3 July 1702 for Thomas Winford, with remainder in default of male issue of his own to the male issue of his deceased brother Henry Winford. The Winford family were settled at Glasshampton, Worcestershire, where they had an estate. Winford was succeeded according to the special remainder by his nephew, the second Baronet, who also inherited the Norgrove estate from another uncle, Sir Thomas Cookes, 2nd Baronet on condition that he adopted the additional surname of Cookes. He was Member of Parliament for Worcestershire between 1707 and 1710. The title became extinct on his death in 1744.

== Winford baronets, of Glasshampton (1702) ==
- Sir Thomas Winford, 1st Baronet (died 1702)
- Sir Thomas Cookes Winford, 2nd Baronet (1673–1744)
