= Piddle Brook =

Stream in Worcestershire, England

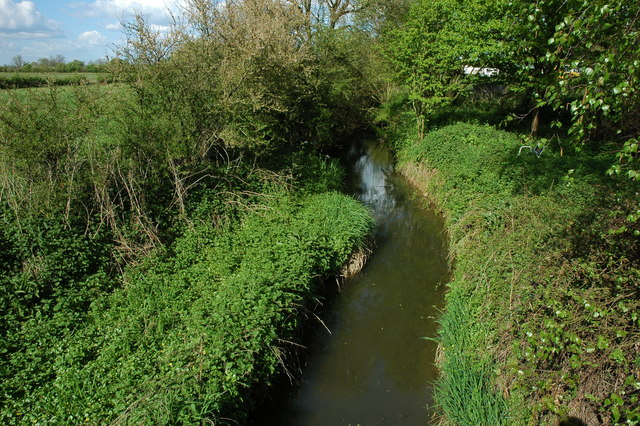
- Piddle Brook flowing through Naunton Beauchamp

Physical characteristics
- Mouth
  - location: River Avon
  - coordinates: 52.116771°N 2.068359°W

The Piddle Brook is a watercourse in Worcestershire; It starts in Kington and flows past the villages of Flyford Flavell, North Piddle, Naunton Beauchamp and Wyre Piddle before joining the River Avon near Pershore.

In 2009 Worcestershire Wildlife Trust purchased the meadows in Naunton Beauchamp which Piddle Brook flows through.

The brook is forded on the road to Naunton Beauchamp at Sea Ford.

== Origin of the name ==
William Henry Dugan, in his book Worcestershire Place Names, states that although the word "Piddle" is not listed in any Anglo-Saxon dictionary, it is found in a few places in Anglo-Saxon charters. Dugan believes that the word "Piddle" is an old English word for a small stream. The former Celtic name for the Piddle may have been Wyre, as there is a town on the brook called Wyre Piddle.

== See also ==
- River Piddle, Dorset
