= Dunley, Worcestershire =

Village in Worcestershire, England

Coordinates: 52.32018°N 2.310412°W

Dunley
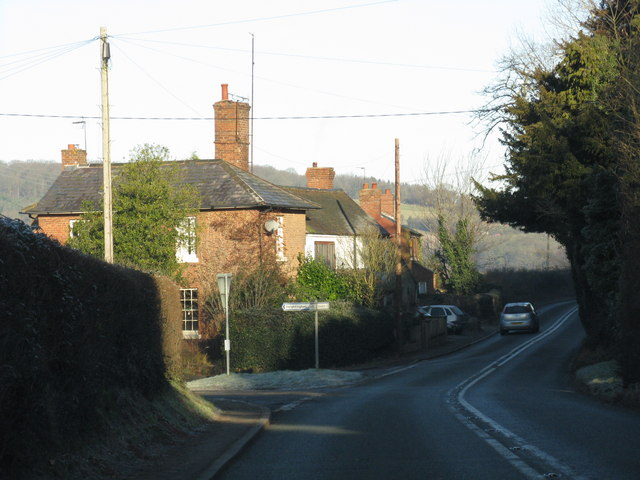

- Location within Worcestershire
- Population: 1,029
- District: Malvern Hills
- Shire county: Worcestershire
- Region: West Midlands
- Country: England
- Sovereign state: United Kingdom
- Post town: Stourport-on-Severn
- Postcode district: DY13
- Police: West Mercia
- Fire: Hereford and Worcester
- Ambulance: West Midlands
- UK Parliament: West Worcestershire

Dunley is a village, and a civil parish (with Astley), in the administrative district of Malvern Hills in the county of Worcestershire, England.
