= Hill Croome =

Village in Worcestershire, England

Coordinates: 52.062384°N 2.166367°W

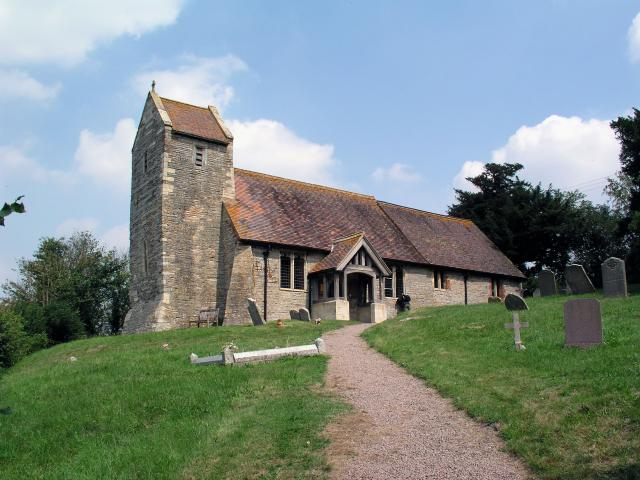
- Hill Croome Church

- Location within Worcestershire
- Population: 169
- Civil parish: Hill Croome
- District: Malvern Hills
- Shire county: Worcestershire
- Region: West Midlands
- Country: England
- Sovereign state: United Kingdom
- Post town: Worcester
- Postcode district: WR8
- Police: West Mercia
- Fire: Hereford and Worcester
- Ambulance: West Midlands
- UK Parliament: West Worcestershire

Hill Croome is a village, and a civil parish which covers 1000 acres, in the Malvern Hills District in the county of Worcestershire, England. Historically a parish in the lower division of the hundred of Oswaldslow, according to the 2001 census the parish had a population of 169. Hill Croome was once part of the Royal forest of Horewell.

== History ==
A heritable messuage of land and a close in the hamlet of Baughton, which also lies in Hill Croome parish, were held in 1591 by John Turberville and his wife Joan under a lease from Thomas Walshe, Lord the Manor of Hill Croome.
