= Pinvin =

Village in Worcestershire, England

Coordinates: 52.13844°N 2.067146°W

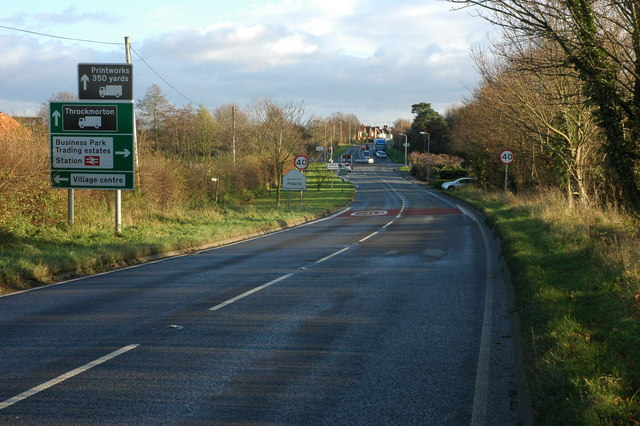
- Crossroads at Pinvin

- Location within Worcestershire
- OS grid reference: SO955489
- District: Wychavon
- Shire county: Worcestershire
- Region: West Midlands
- Country: England
- Sovereign state: United Kingdom
- Post town: PERSHORE
- Postcode district: WR10
- Police: West Mercia
- Fire: Hereford and Worcester
- Ambulance: West Midlands

Pinvin is a village in Worcestershire, England, a little to the north of Pershore, about 7 1/2 miles (12.1 km) south-east of Worcester, and about 6 miles (9.7 km) north-west of Evesham and lies on the crossroads of the A44, A4104 and B4082. It is also the location of Pershore railway station. The village has a church and a pub. It also has a first school (rated Good by Ofsted) and a middle school (rated Requires Improvement by Ofsted); pre-school activities take place in the village hall.

The name is thought to come from 'Penda's fen' after the Mercian King Penda, who was probably born in the nearby Cotswolds. David Rudkin's TV play Penda's Fen (1974) was set here and also references this fact.
