= Ryall, Worcestershire =

Village in Worcestershire, England

Coordinates: 52.06722°N 2.19106°W

Ryall
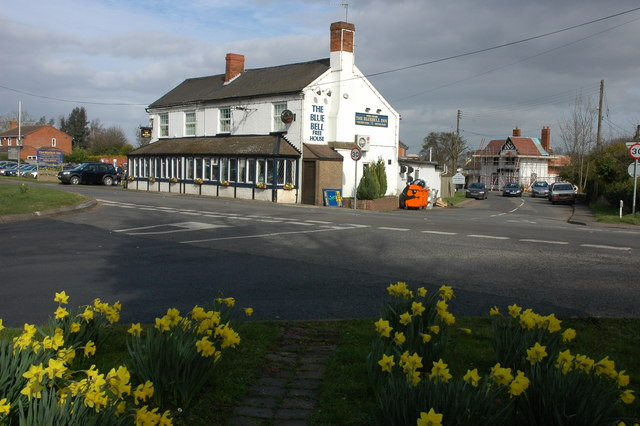
- The Blue Bell, Ryall

- Location within Worcestershire
- OS grid reference: SO870410
- Civil parish: Ripple
- District: Malvern Hills
- Shire county: Worcestershire
- Region: West Midlands
- Country: England
- Sovereign state: United Kingdom
- Post town: WORCESTER
- Postcode district: WR8
- Police: West Mercia
- Fire: Hereford and Worcester
- Ambulance: West Midlands

Ryall is a village in Worcestershire, England, on the east bank of the River Severn, near Upton-upon-Severn on the opposite bank.

The village is located on the A38 road that runs roughly parallel to the River Severn, on its Tewkesbury to Kempsey stretch, and on the A4104, which crosses the Severn at Upton.

The part of the village by the A38 is called The Grove, and includes the Blue Bell public house. The part along the A4104 is called Holly Green.
