= Besford Bridge =

Village in Worcestershire, England

Coordinates: 52.112699°N 2.115769°W

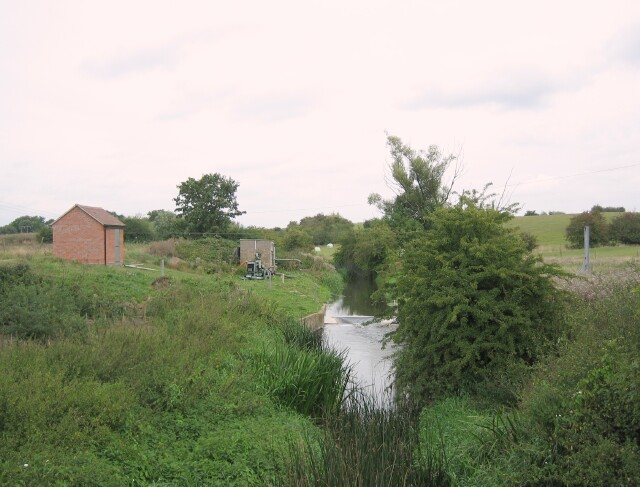
- Besford Bridge Pumping Station

- Location within Worcestershire
- OS grid reference: SO921460
  - London: 96 miles (154 km)
- District: Wychavon
- Shire county: Worcestershire
- Region: West Midlands
- Country: England
- Sovereign state: United Kingdom
- Post town: PERSHORE
- Postcode district: WR10
- Dialling code: 01386
- Police: West Mercia
- Fire: Hereford and Worcester
- Ambulance: West Midlands

Besford Bridge is a village in Worcestershire, England. The village is located near Malvern, Evesham, Redditch, and Droitwich Spa.
