= Wyre Piddle =

Village in Worcestershire, England

Coordinates: 52.1245°N 2.0509°W

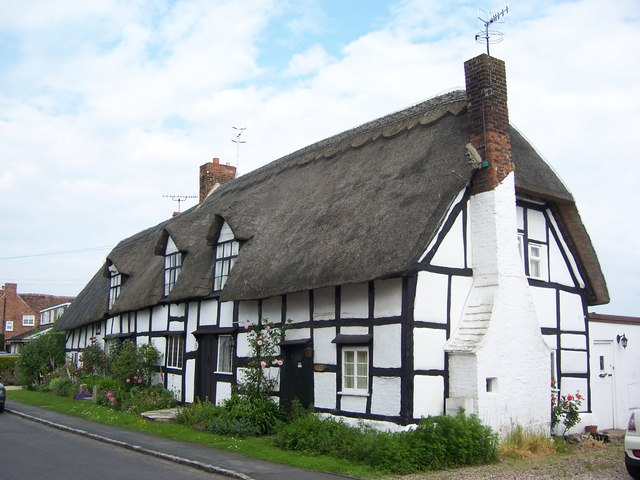
- Church Street, Wyre Piddle

- Location within Worcestershire
- Population: 614
- OS grid reference: SO965475
- District: Wychavon
- Shire county: Worcestershire
- Region: West Midlands
- Country: England
- Sovereign state: United Kingdom
- Post town: PERSHORE
- Postcode district: WR10
- Dialling code: 01386
- Police: West Mercia
- Fire: Hereford and Worcester
- Ambulance: West Midlands
- UK Parliament: Droitwich and Evesham

Wyre Piddle is a village and civil parish in the Wychavon district of Worcestershire, England. At the 2021 census, it had a population of 614. It is on the River Avon, near where that river is joined by the Piddle Brook - between Evesham and Pershore.

== History ==
Two archaeological excavations in the area have found evidence of late Iron Age and Roman occupation and also an enclosed pastoral settlement with four periods of occupation dating from the Middle Iron Age.

In 1967 a hoard of 219 silver coins, some from as early as 1280 and none later than 1467, was found there.

It was the home village of Claude Choules, who was born in Pershore on 3 March 1901 and became the last surviving male veteran of World War I. He moved to Australia in 1926 and died in Perth, Western Australia on 5 May 2011, aged 110.

== Amenities ==
There are two public houses situated in Wyre, The Anchor Inn and The Hotel. The Anchor Inn used to serve Wyre Piddle's locally brewed beer 'Piddle in The Hole' before the Wyre Piddle brewery was dissolved in September 2015.
