= Himbleton =

Village in Worcestershire, England

Coordinates: 52.224155°N 2.079484°W

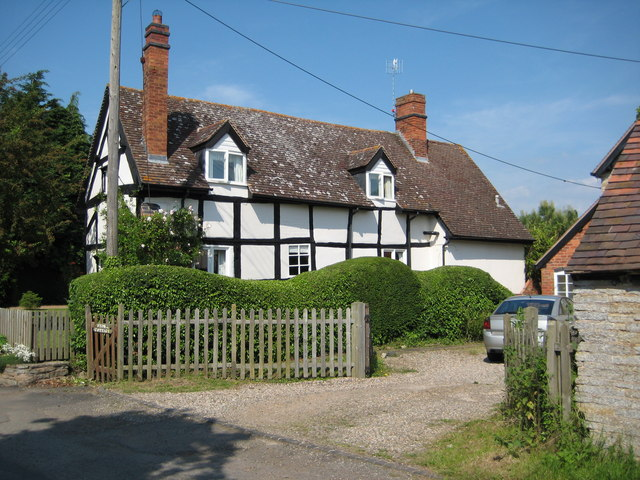
- Cottage in Himbleton

- Location within Worcestershire
- Population: 468 (2021)
- OS grid reference: SO650649
  - London: 100 mi (160 km) SE
- Civil parish: Himbleton
- District: Wychavon
- Shire county: Worcestershire
- Region: West Midlands
- Country: England
- Sovereign state: United Kingdom
- Post town: WORCESTER
- Postcode district: WR9
- Dialling code: 01905
- Police: West Mercia
- Fire: Hereford and Worcester
- Ambulance: West Midlands
- UK Parliament: Droitwich and Evesham

Himbleton is a village and civil parish in the Wychavon district, in the county of Worcestershire, England. It lies about 5 miles (8.0 km) south-east of Droitwich and 7.5 miles (12.1 km) north-east of Worcester. There is an Anglican church, dedicated to Saint Mary Magdalene. The parish includes the hamlet of Shell. In 2021 the parish had a population of 468.

The name Himbleton probably derives from the Old English hymeletūn meaning 'settlement growing with hops'.

Located on Neight Hill in the village is a primary school, Himbleton Church of England Primary School, which was opened in 1873. There is also a pub, The Galton Arms, which has featured several times in the Good Beer Guide.

The local cricket team, Himbleton Cricket Club, play in the Worcestershire County League Division 2. Himbleton has historic significance as one of the villages through which the Catholic anarchists under Guy Fawkes travelled.

On 25 March 1884 the parish was of Shell was abolished and merged with Himbleton.

== See also ==
- History of Worcestershire
