= Habershon =

Habershon may refer to:

- Ada R. Habershon, English Christian hymnist
- Matthew Habershon (1789–1852), English architect
- Samuel Osborne Habershon, English physician
- Edward Habershon, English architect
- William Habershon, English architect, son of Matthew Habershon and partner in Habershon and Fawckner
