= Eliza Sibbald Alderson =

English poet and hymn writer (1818–1889)

- Born: 16 August 1818; Kingston upon Hull
- Died: 18 March 1889 (aged 70)
- Resting place: Kirkthorpe churchyard
- Citizenship: English
- Known for: Poet and hymn writer

Eliza Sibbald Alderson (16 August 1818 – 18 March 1889) was an English poet and hymn writer.

== Biography ==
Eliza Sibbald Dykes, sister of the hymnwriter the Rev. J. B. Dykes, was born at Kingston upon Hull in the East Riding of Yorkshire, England. Eliza and her brother began composing as children while attending their grandfather's church in Hull. They sometimes collaborated, with Eliza asking John to compose a tune to accompany words she had written. She composed many hymns, a few of which were published under the title “Twelve Hymns”. Two of her most famous begin “And now, beloved Lord, thy soul residing” and “Lord of Glory who has bought us”. She also wrote poetry and painted, contributing paintings, for instance, at a grand bazaar in the corn exchange in October 1870 alongside those of the better known local artist Louisa Fennell.

On 12 September 1850, she married William Thompson Alderson, who was chaplain of the West Riding House of Correction (from 1833 to 1876) and 12 years her senior, at Wakefield Parish Church; the ceremony was performed by her ordained brothers, Thomas, curate of Holy Trinity in Hull, and John Bacchus, precentor of Durham Cathedral. She then went to live with him in his quarters at the prison. This accommodation must have been spacious and commodious inasmuch as ten years later the couple had their six children aged between 8 months and 8 years living with them, plus two of William's sisters, a visitor, and four servants. In 1871, they were still living at the prison with their three sons, one of whom, Charles Sibbald Alderson, had become a banker's clerk. A younger son, Edward, would follow suit by the time he was 20 in 1881. In that same year, at census time, Eliza was staying with her brother Edward and two of her sisters at his bank in Parliament Street, Hull.

In 1886, she composed a hymn specially for the re-opening of Filey church in East Yorkshire after its restoration. She was referred to as John Bacchus Dykes' sister. Her husband had taken a post as curate of Kirkthorpe Church, on the outskirts of Wakefield, in 1880 so that in 1881 they lived in the vicarage there until her death on 18 March 1889. She was buried in nearby Kirkthorpe churchyard.

== See also ==
Other English women hymnwriters of the 18th to 19th century include:

- Sarah Bache
- Charlotte Alington Barnard
- Sarah Doudney
- Charlotte Elliott
- Ada R. Habershon
- Katherine Hankey
- Frances Ridley Havergal
- Maria Grace Saffery
- Anne Steele
- Emily Taylor
- Emily H. Woodmansee

== Sources ==
- Julian, John (June 1907). A Dictionary of Hymnology. London: John Murray. p. 38.
- Bethany Lutheran College. "Evangelical Lutheran Hymnary Handbook — Biographies and Sources".
- Concordia Historical Institute. "Today in History March 18".
