= Frances Ridley Havergal =

British poet and hymn-writer (1836–1879)

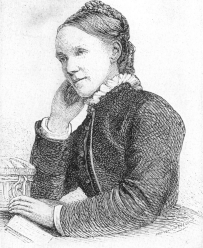
- Born: Frances Ridley Havergal; 14 December 1836; Astley, Worcestershire, England
- Died: 3 June 1879 (aged 42) near Caswell Bay, Gower Peninsula, Wales
- Resting place: churchyard, St Peter's parish church, Astley
- Education: Mrs. Teed's
- Occupations: religious poet, hymnwriter
- Writing career
- Language: English

Frances Ridley Havergal (14 December 1836 – 3 June 1879) was an English religious poet and hymnwriter. Take My Life and Let It Be and Thy Life for Me (also known as I Gave My Life for Thee) are two of her best known hymns. She also wrote hymn melodies, religious tracts, and works for children.

== Early life and education ==
Frances Ridley Havergal was born into an Anglican family, at Astley in Worcestershire, 14 December 1836. Her father, William Henry Havergal (1793–1870), was a clergyman, writer, composer, and hymnwriter. Her brother, Henry East Havergal, was a priest in the Church of England and an organist. She was baptized in Astley Church by Rev. John Cawood on 25 January 1837.

When she was five, her father moved to the Rectory of St. Nicholas, Worcester. In August, 1850, she entered Mrs. Teed's school, who had a strong influence on her. In the following year she says, "I committed my soul to the Saviour, and earth and heaven seemed brighter from that moment." A short sojourn in Germany followed. In 1852/3, she studied in the Louisenschule, Düsseldorf, and at Oberkassel. Havergal's scholastic acquirements were extensive, embracing several modern languages, together with Greek and Hebrew.

On her return to England, she was confirmed in Worcester Cathedral, 17 July 1853.

== Career ==
In 1860, she left Worcester upon her father resigning the Rectory of St. Nicholas, and resided at different periods in Leamington, and at Caswell Bay, Swansea, broken by visits to Switzerland, Scotland, and North Wales. It was during this time—1873—that she read J. T. Renford's little booklet All For Jesus, which "lifted her whole life into sunshine, of which all she had previously experienced was but as pale and passing April gleams, compared with the fullness of summer glory." She led a quiet life, not enjoying consistent good health. She supported the Church Missionary Society.

Havergal's hymns were frequently printed by J. & R. Parlane as leaflets, and by Caswall & Co. as ornamental cards. They were gathered together from time to time and published in her works as follows:— (1) Ministry of Song, 1869; (2) Twelve Sacred Songs for Little Singers, 1870; (3) Under the Surface, 1874; (4) Loyal Responses, 1878; (5) Life Mosaic, 1879; (6) Life Chords, 1880; and (7) Life Echoes, 1883.

About fifteen of the more important of Havergal's hymns, including “Golden harps are sounding,” “I gave my life for thee," “Jesus, Master, Whose I am,” “Lord, speak to me,” “O Master, at Thy feet,” “Take my life and let it be,” “Tell it out among the heathen," &c., are annotated under their respective first lines. The rest, which are in collections, number nearly fifty. These are noted here, together with dates and places of composition, from the Havergal manuscripts and the works in which they were published. Those which were printed in Parlane's Series of Leaflets are distinguished as (P., 1872, &c.) and those in Caswall's series (C., 1873, &c).

Most of these hymns are given in Snepp's Songs of Grace and Glory, and many of them are also in several other hymn-books, including Hymns Ancient and Modern, Hymns and Sacred Lyrics, Church Hymns, The Hymnal Companion, and some of the leading American collections.

== Death and legacy ==
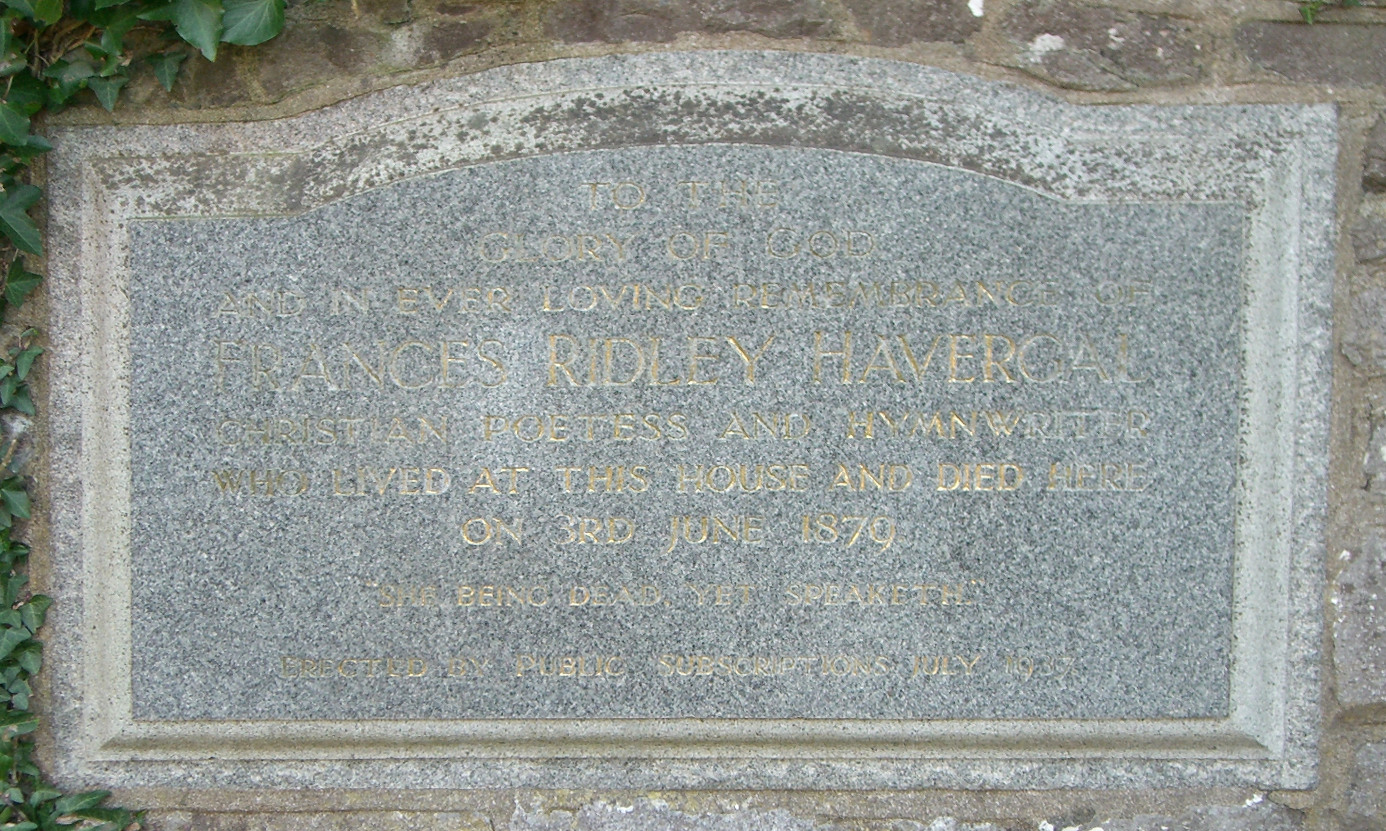
Memorial plaque situated near Caswell Bay

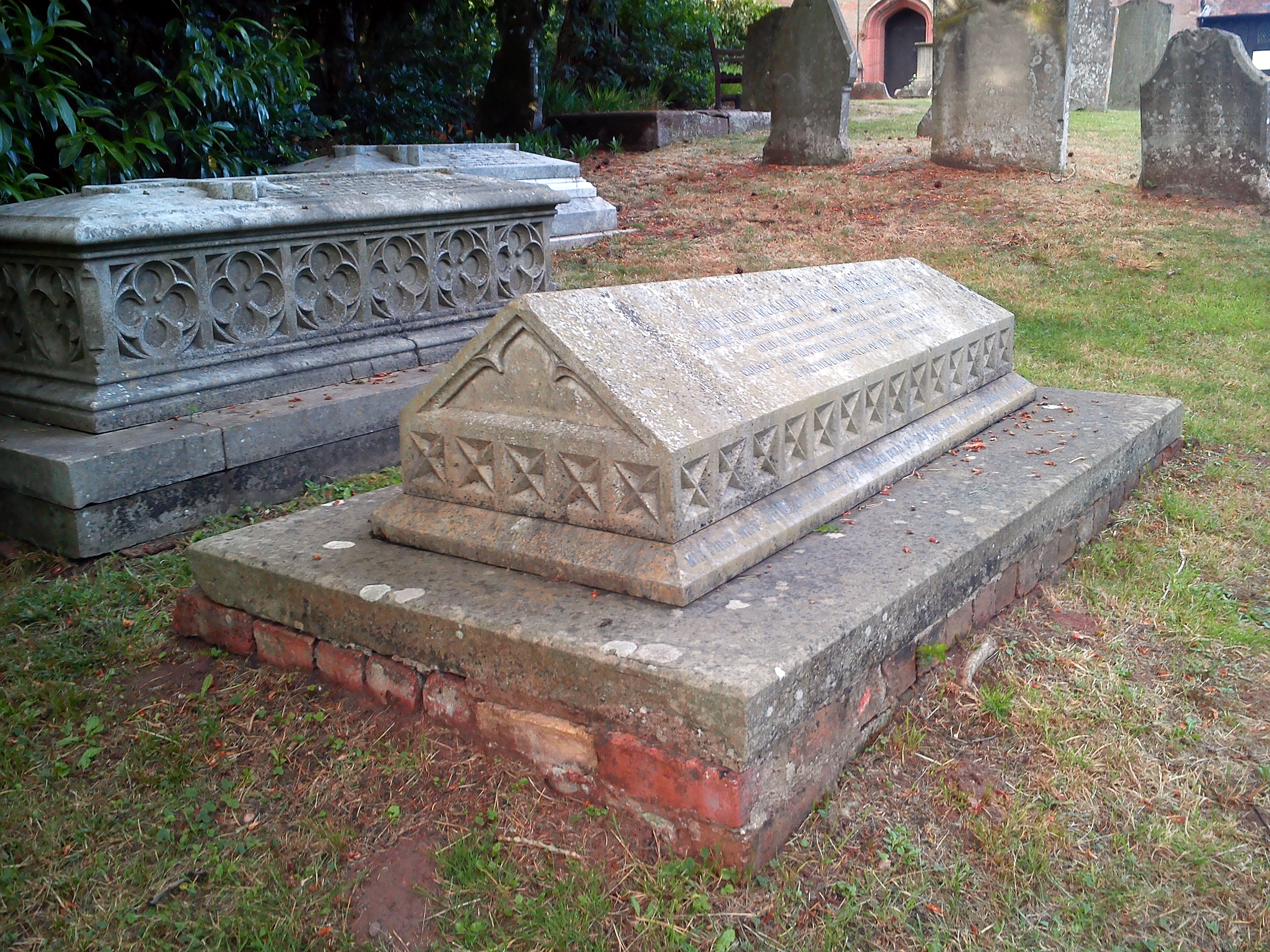
Astley, Worcestershire, St Peter's Church: grave of Frances Ridley Havergal and of her father William Henry Havergal

Havergal died of peritonitis near Caswell Bay on the Gower Peninsula in Wales at age 42. She is buried in the far western corner of the churchyard at St Peter's parish church, Astley, together with her father and near her sister, Maria V. G. Havergal.

Her sisters saw much of her work published posthumously. Havergal College, a private girls' school in Toronto, is named after her. The composer Havergal Brian adopted the name as a tribute to the Havergal family.

== Style and themes ==
Her hymns praised the love of God, and His way of salvation to this end, and for this object, her whole life and all her powers were consecrated. She lived and spoke in every line of her poetry.

Her religious views and theological bias were distinctly set forth in her poems, and may be described as mildly Calvinistic, without the severe dogmatic tenet of reprobation. The burden of her writings was a free and full salvation, through the Redeemer's merits, for every sinner who will receive it, and her life was devoted to the proclamation of this truth by personal labours, literary efforts, and earnest interest in Foreign Missions.

== Selected works ==
=== Books ===
- Ministry of Song (1870)
- Take My Life and Let It Be (1874)
- Under the Surface (1874)
- The four happy days (1874)
- Like a river glorious is God's perfect peace (1876)
- Who Is on the Lord's Side? Who will Serve the King? (1877)
- Royal Commandments (1878)
- O Merciful Redeemer
- Loyal Responses (1878)
- Kept for the Master's Use (1879) memoir
- Life Chords (1880)
- Royal Bounty (1877)
- Little Pillows, or Goodnight Thoughts for the Little Ones (1880)
- Morning bells, or, Waking thoughts for the little ones (1880)
- Swiss Letters and Alpine Poems (1881) edited by J. M. Crane
- Under His Shadow: the Last Poems of Frances Ridley Havergal (1881)
- The Royal Invitation (1882)
- Life Echoes (1883)
- Poetical Works (1884) edited by M. V. G. Havergal and Frances Anna Shaw
- Coming to the King (1886)
- Jesus, Master, Whose I am Hymns of the Christian Life 1936
- My King and His Service (1892)
- Forget Me Nots of Promise, Text from Scripture and verses by Frances Ridley Havergal, Marcus Ward&Co.

=== Hymns ===
1. A happy New Year! Even such may it be. (Occasion or theme: New Year.) From Under the Surface, 1874.
2. Certainly I will be with thee. Birthday. September 1871, at Perry Barr. (P. 1871.) Published in Under the Surface, 1874, and Life Mosaic, 1879.
3. Church of God, beloved and chosen. (Occasion or theme: Sanctified in Christ Jesus.) 1873. (P. 1873.) Published in Under the Surface, 1874, and Life Mosaic, 1879.
4. God Almighty, King of nations. (Occasion or theme: Sovereignty of God.) 1872. Published in Under the Surface, 1874, and Life Mosaic, 1879.
5. God doth not bid thee wait.. (Occasion or theme: God faithful to His promises.) 22 October 1868, at Okehampton. (P. 1869.) Published in Ministry of Song, 1869, and Life Mosaic, 1879.
6. God of heaven, hear our singing. (Occasion or theme: A Child's hymn for Missions.) 22 October 1869, at Leamington. Published in her Twelve Sacred Songs for Little Singers, 1870, and her Life Chords, 1880.
7. God will take care of you, All through the day. (Occasion or theme: The Good Shepherd.) In Mrs. Brock's Children's Hymn Book, 1881.
8. God's reiterated all. (Occasion or theme: New Year.) 1873, at Winterdyne. (C. 1873.) Published in Loyal Responses, 1878, and Life Mosaic, 1879.
9. Have you not a word for Jesus?. (Occasion or theme: Boldness for the Truth.) November 1871, at Perry Barr. (P. 1872.) Published in Under the Surface, 1874, and Life Mosaic, 1879.
10. He hath spoken in the darkness. (Occasion or theme: Voice of God in sorrow.) 10 June 1869, at Neuhausen. (P. 1870.) Published in Under the Surface, 1874, and in Life Mosaic, 1879.
11. Hear the Father's ancient promise. (Occasion or theme: Promise of the Holy Spirit.) August 1870. Published in Under the Surface, 1874, and Life Mosaic, 1879.
12. Holy and Infinite! Viewless, Eternal. (Occasion or theme: Infinity of God.) IST2. Published in Under the Surface, 1874, and Life Mosaic, 1879.
13. Holy brethren, called and chosen. (Occasion or theme: Motive for Earnestness.) 1872. of Snepp's Songs of Grace and Glory, 1876.
14. I am trusting Thee, Lord Jesus. (Occasion or theme: Faith.) September 1874, at Ormont Dessons. (P. 1874.) Published in Loyal Responses, 1878, and Life Chords, 1880. Havergal's tune, "Urbane" (Snepp's Songs of Grace and Glory, 1048), was composed for this hymn. The hymn was the author's "own favourite," and was found in her pocket Bible after her death.
15. I bring my sins to Thee. (Occasion or theme: Resting all on Jesus.) June, 1870. (P. 1870.) Printed in the Sunday Magazine, 1870, and Home Words, 1872. Published in Under the Surface, 1874, and Life Chords, 1880.
16. I could not do without Thee. (Occasion or theme: Jesus All in All.) 7 May 1873. (P. 1873.) Printed in Home Words, 1873, and published in Under the Surface, 1874, and Life Mosaic, 1879.
17. In full and glad surrender. (Occasion or theme: Confirmation.) Havergal's sister says this hymn was "The epitome of her [Miss F. R. H.'s] life and the focus of its sunshine." It is a hymn of personal consecration to God at all times.
18. In the evening there is weeping. (Occasion or theme: Sorrow followed by Joy.) 19 June 1869, at the Hotel Jungfraublick, Interlaken. "It rained all day, except a very bright interval before dinner. Curious long soft white clouds went slowly creeping along the Schynige Platte; I wrote "Evening Tears and Morning Songs." (Marg. reading of Ps. xxx. 5.)" (P. 1870.) Published in Under the Surface, 1874.
19. Increase our faith, beloved Lord. (Occasion or theme: Increase of Faith desired.) In Loyal Responses, 1878, in 11 stanzas of 4 lines, on St. Luke xvii. 5. It is usually given in an abridged form.
20. Is it for me, dear Saviour?. (Occasion or theme: Heaven anticipated.) November 1871, at Perry Barr. (P. 1872.) Published in Under the Surface, 1874, and Life Mosaic, 1879.
21. Israel of God, awaken. (Occasion or theme: Christ our Righteousness.0 May 1871, at Perry Barr. (P. 1872.) Published in Under the Surface, 1874, and Life Mosaic, 1879.
22. Jehovah's covenant shall endure. (Occasion or theme: The Divine Covenant), 1872. Published in Charles Busbridge Snepp's Songs of Grace and Glory, 1876.
23. Jesus, blessed Saviour. (Occasion or theme: New Year.) 25 November 1872, at Leamington. (P. 1873.) Printed in the Day, spring Magazine, January 1873, and published in Life Chords, 1880.
24. Jesus only! In the shadow. (Occasion or theme: Jesus All in All.) 4 December 1870, at Pyrmont Villa. (P. de C. 1871.) Published in Under the Surface, 1874, and in Life Mosaic, 1879.
25. Joined to Christ by [in] mystic union. (Occasion or theme: The Church the Body of Christ.) May, 1871, at Perry Barr. (P. 1872.) Published in Under the Surface, 1874, Life Mosaic, 1879.
26. Just when Thou wilt, 0 Master, call. (Occasion or theme: Resignation.) In Loyal Responses, 1878, in 5 stanza of 4 lines, and Whiting's Hys. for the Church Catholic, 1882.
27. King Eternal and Immortal. (Occasion or theme: God Eternal.) Written at Perry Willa, Perry Barr, 11 February 1871, and published in Snepp's Songs of Grace and Glory, 1876; Under the Surface, 1874; and Life Mosaic, 1879.
28. Light after darkness, Gain after loss. (Occasion or theme: Peace in Jesus, and the Divine Reward.) In Sankey's Sac. Songs and Solos, from her Life Mosaic, 1879.
29. Like a river glorious, Is God's perfect Peace. (Occasion or theme: Peace.) In her Loyal Responses, 1878, in 3 stanzas of 8 lines, with the chorus, "Stayed upon Jehovah." In several collections.
30. Master, speak! Thy servant heareth. (Occasion or theme: Fellowship with and Assistance from Christ desired.) Sunday evening, 19 May 1867, at Weston-super-Mare. Published in Ministry of Song, 1869, and Life Mosaic, 1879. It is very popular.
31. New mercies, new blessings, new light on thy way. (Occasion or theme: New Life in Christ.) 1874, st Winterdyne. (0. 1874.) Published in Under His Shadow, 1879, Life Chords, 1880.
32. Not your own, but His ye are. (Occasion or theme: Missions.) 21 January 1867. (C. 1867.) Published in Ministry of Song, 1869; Life Mosaic, 1879; and the Hyl. for Church Missions, 1884.
33. Now let us sing the ' song. (Occasion or theme: Christmas.) In her Life Mosaic, 1879; and W. R. Stevenson's School Hymnal, 1880.
34. Now the daylight goes away. (Occasion or theme: Evening.) 17 October 1869, at Leamington. Published in Songs for Little Singers, 1870, and Life Chords, 1880. It originally read, "Now the light has gone away."
35. Now the sowing and the weeping. (Occasion or theme: Sorrow followed by Joy.) 4 January 1870, at Leamington. Printed in Sunday at Home, 1871; and published in Under the Surface, 1874, and Life Mosaic, 1879.
36. O Glorious God and King. (Occasion or theme: Praise to the Father.) February 1872. Published in Under the Surface, 1874, and Life Mosaic, 1879.
37. O Saviour, precious holy! Saviour. (Occasion or theme: Christ worshipped by the Church.) November 1870, at Leamington. (P. 1870.) Published in Under the Surface, 1874, and Life Mosaic, 1879.
38. 0 thou chosen Church of Jesus. (Occasion or theme: Election.) 6 April 1871. Published in Under the Surface, 1874, and Life Mosaic, 1879.
39. 0 what everlasting blessings God outpo His own. (Occasion or theme: Salvation everlasting.) 12 August 1871, Perry Barr. (P. 1871.) Published in Under the Surface, 1874, and Life Mosaic, 1879.
40. Our Father, our Father, Who dwellest in light. (Occasion or theme: The blessing of the Father desired.) 14 May 1872. Published in Under the Surface, 1874, and Life Mosaic, 1879. Miss Havergal's tune, Tertius, was composed for this hymn.
41. Our Saviour and our King. (Occasion or theme: Presentation of the Church to the Father.) (Heb. ii. 13.) May, 1871, at Perry Barr. (P. 1871.) Published in Under the Surface, 1874, and Life Mosaic, 1879.
42. Precious, precious blood of Jesus. (Occasion or theme: The precious Blood.) September 1874, at Ormont Dessons. (C.) Published in Loyal Responses, 1878, and Life Chords, 1880.
43. Sing, 0 heavens, the Lord hath done it. (Occasion or theme: Redemption.) In The Life Mosaic, 1879, and the Universal H. Bk., 1885.
44. Sit down beneath. His shadow. (Occasion or theme: Holy Communion.) 27 November 1870, at Leamington. (P. 1870.) Published in Under the Surface, 1874, and Life Mosaic, 1879.
45. Sovereign Lord and gracious Master. (Occasion or theme: Grace consummated in Glory.) 22 October 1871. (P. 1872.) Published in Under the Surface, 1874, and Life Mosaic, 1879.
46. Standing at the portal of the opening year. (Occasion or theme: New Year.) 4 January 1873. Published in Under the Surface, 1874, and Life Chords, 1880.
47. To Thee, 0 Comforter divine. (Occasion or theme: Praise to the Holy Spirit.) 11 August 1872, at Perry Barr. Published in Under the Surface, 1874, and Life Mosaic, 1879. Miss Havergal's tune, Tryphosa, was written for this hymn.
48. True-hearted, whole-hearted, faithful and loyal. (Occasion or theme: Faithfulness to the Saviour.) In her Loyal Responses, 1878, and the Universal Hymn Book, 1885.
49. What know we, Holy God, of Thee!. (Occasion or theme: God's Spirituality.) 1872. Published in Under the Surface, 1874, and Life Mosaic, 1879.
50. Who is on the Lord's side!. (Occasion or theme: Home Missions.) 13 October 1877. Published in Loyal Responses, 1878, and Life Chords, 1880.
51. With quivering heart and trembling will. (Occasion or theme: Resignation.) 10 July 1866, at Luccombe Rectory. (P. 1866.) Published in Ministry of Song, 1869, and Life Mosaic, 1879.
52. Will ye not come to Him for life?. (Occasion or theme: The Gospel footation.) 1873. Published in Snepp's Songs of Grace and Glory d: G., 1876.
53. Worthy of all adoration. (Occasion or theme: Praise to Jesus as the Lamb upon the throne.) 26 February 1867, at Oakhampton. Published in Ministry of Song, 1869, and Life Mosaic, 1874. It is pt. iii. of the "Threefold Praise," and was suggested by the "Worthy is the Lamb," the "Hallelujah" and “Amen "choruses in Handel's Messiah.
54. Ye who hear the blessed call. (Occasion or theme: The Invitation of the Spirit and the Bride.) March, 1869, at Leamington. (P. 1869.) Published in Ministry of Song, 1869, and Life Mosaic, 1879. Suggested by, and written for, the Young Men's Christian Association.
55. Yes, He knows the way is dreary. (Occasion or theme: Encouragement.) 1867. Published in Ministry of Song, 1869.

== Gallery ==
=== Covers and inscriptions ===
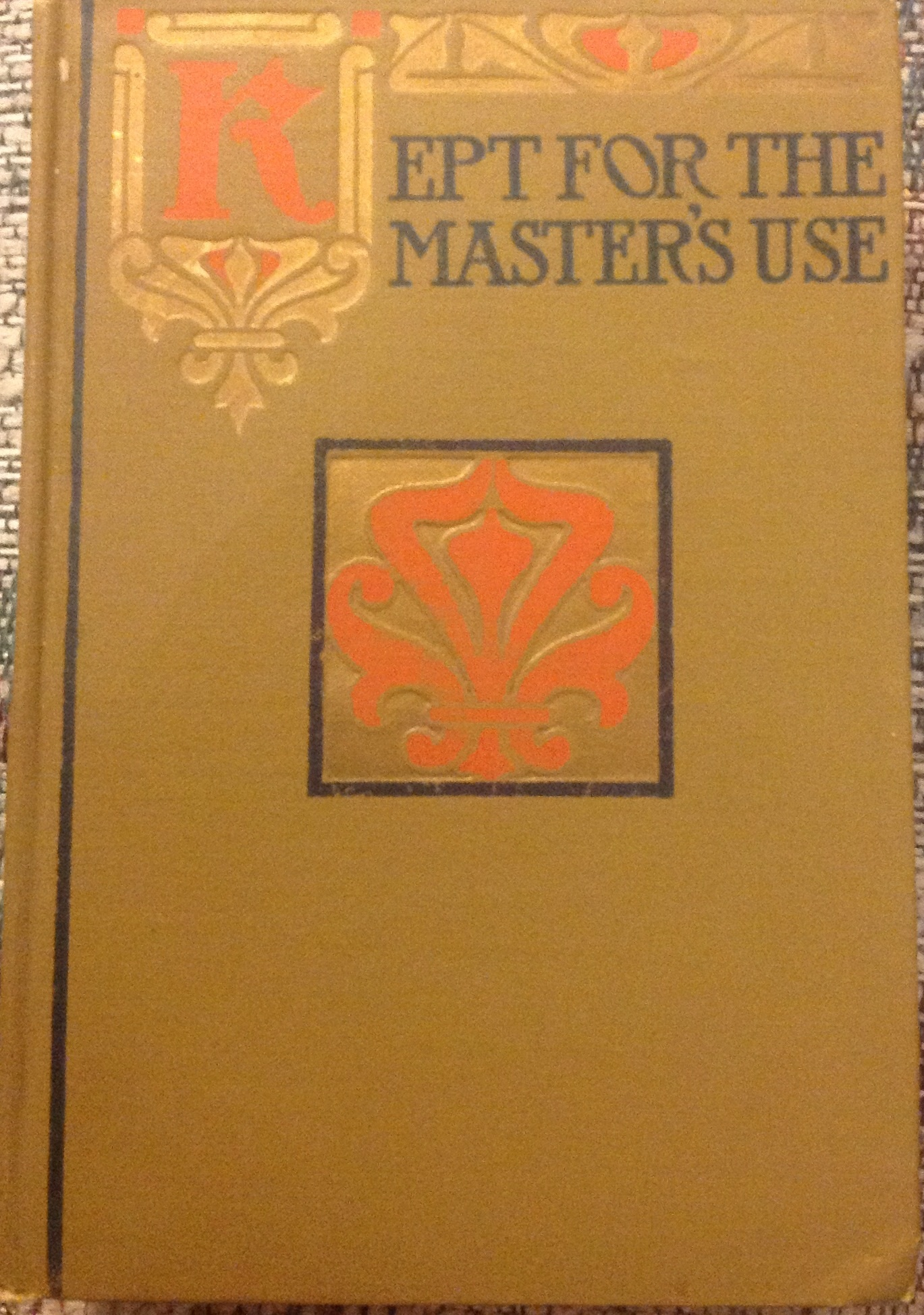
Memoir, 1876

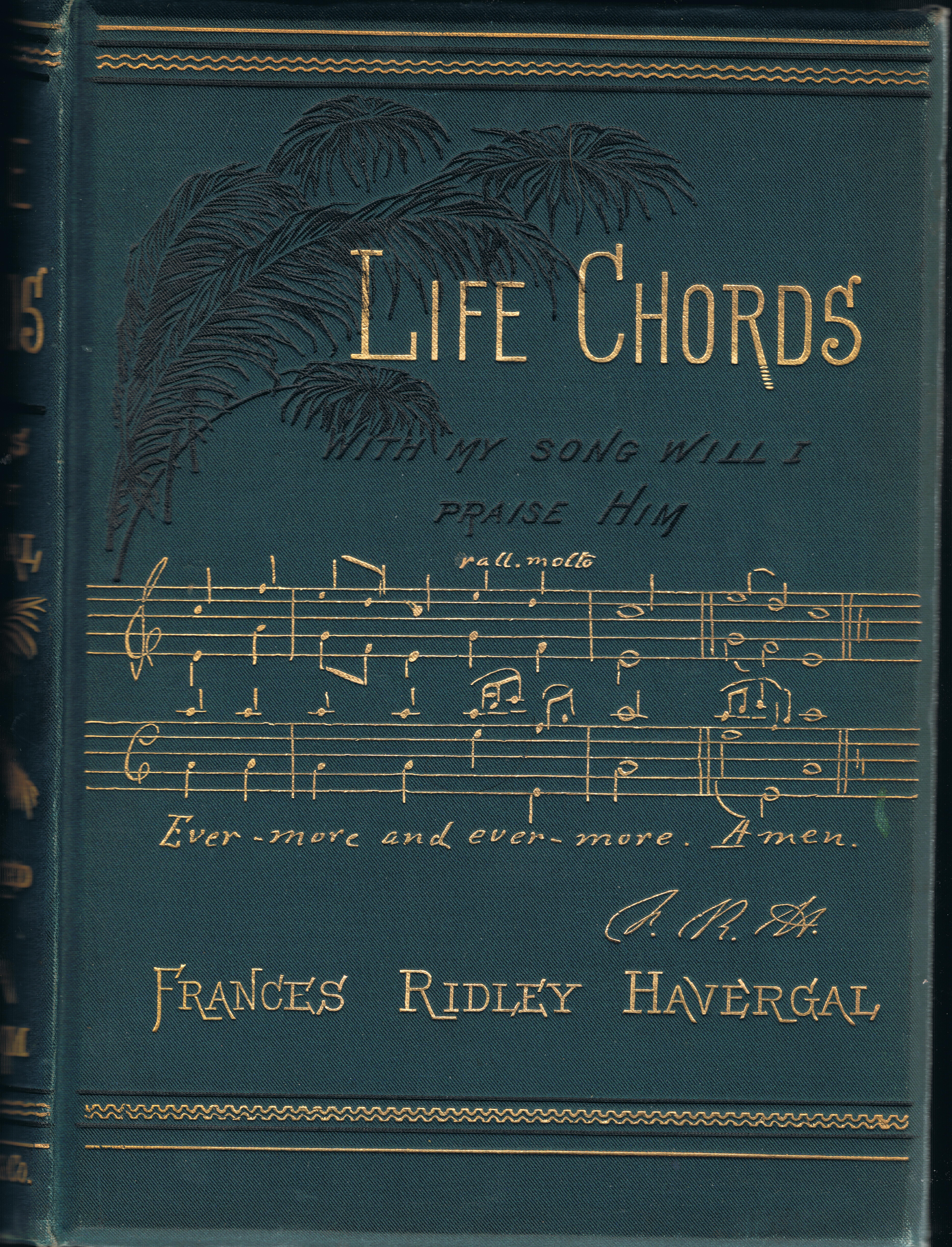
Life Chords, c. 1880

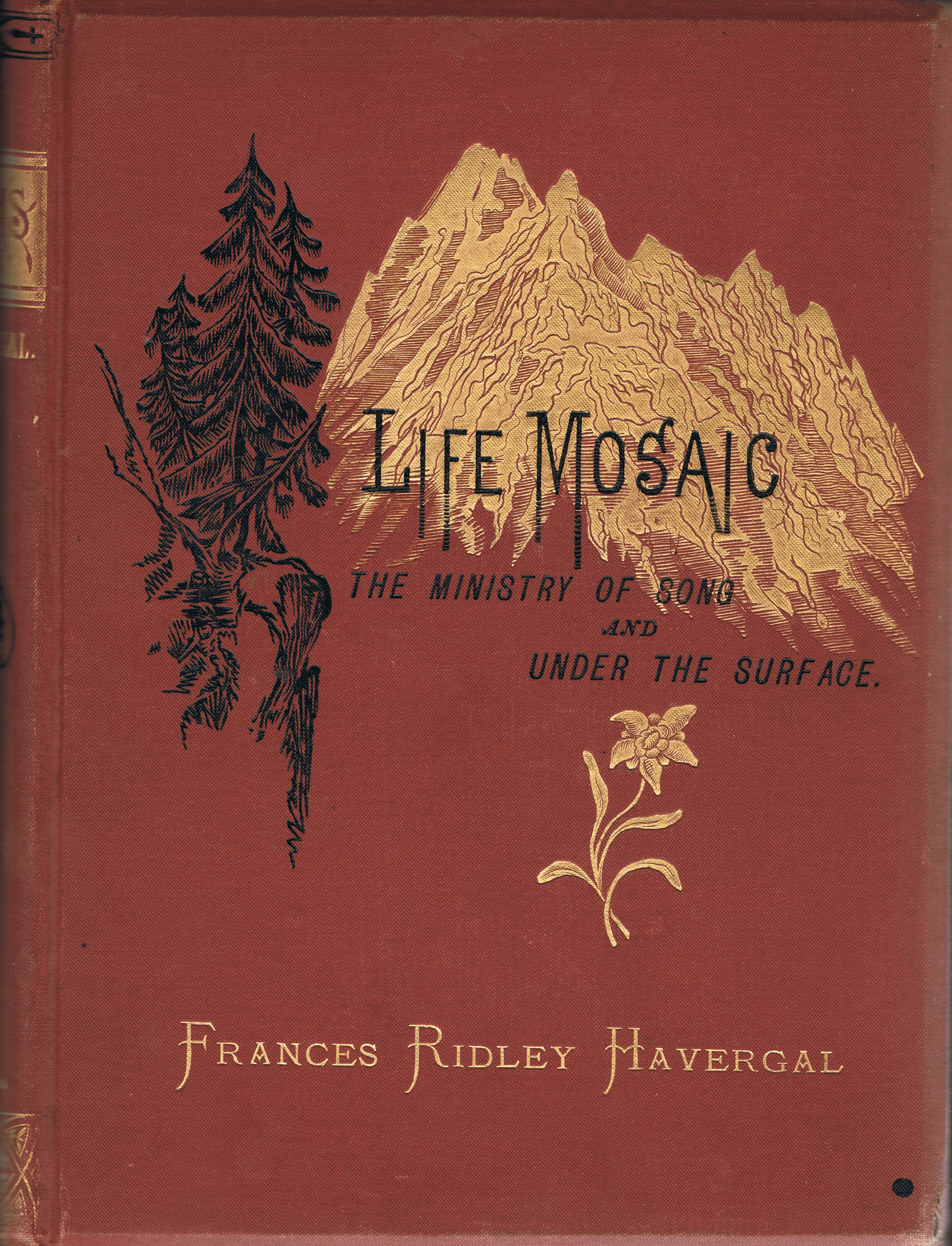
Life Mosaic, The Ministry of Song and Under the Surface, 1878

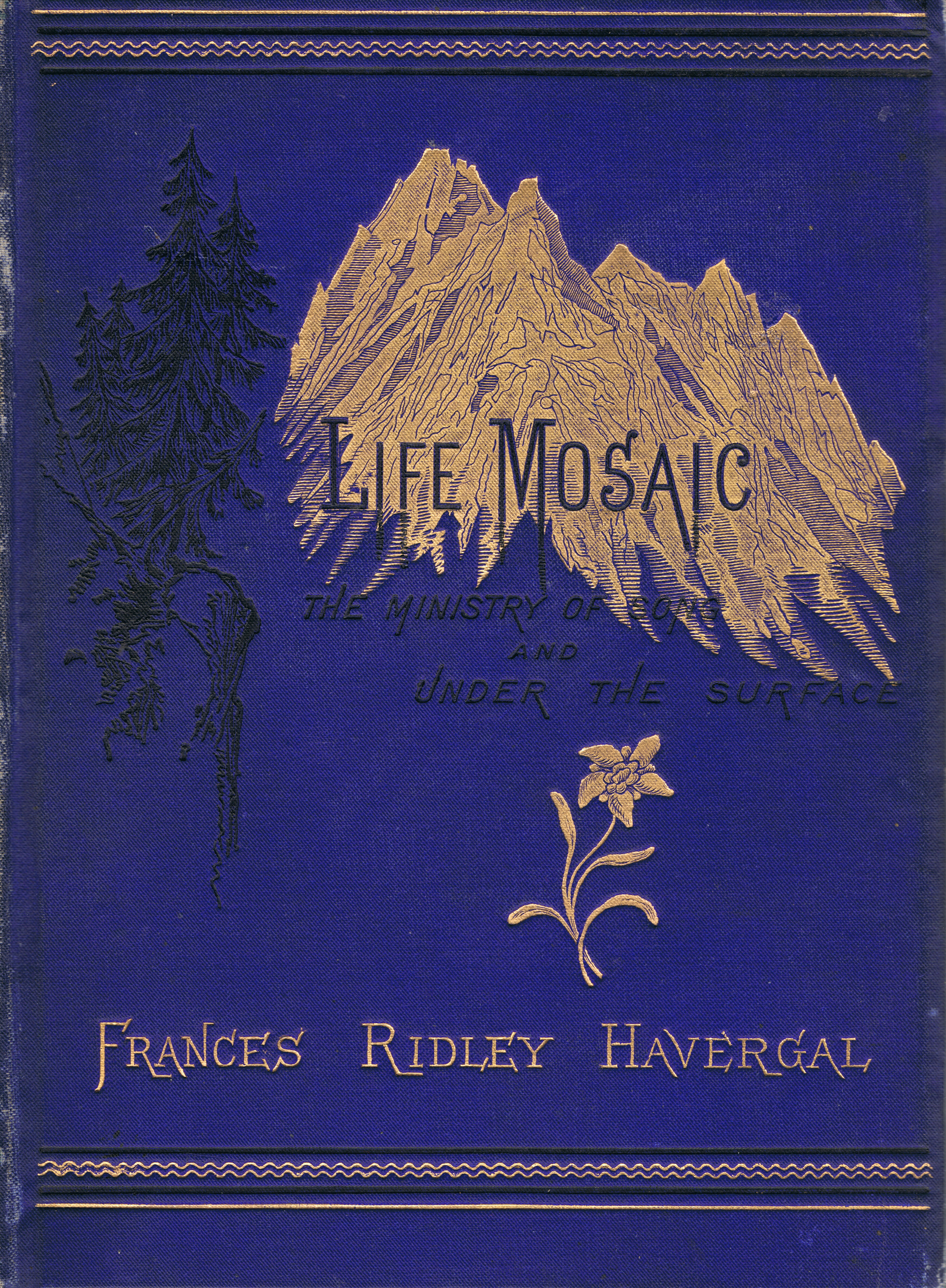
Life Mosaic, The Ministry of Song and Under the Surface, 3rd edition, 1879

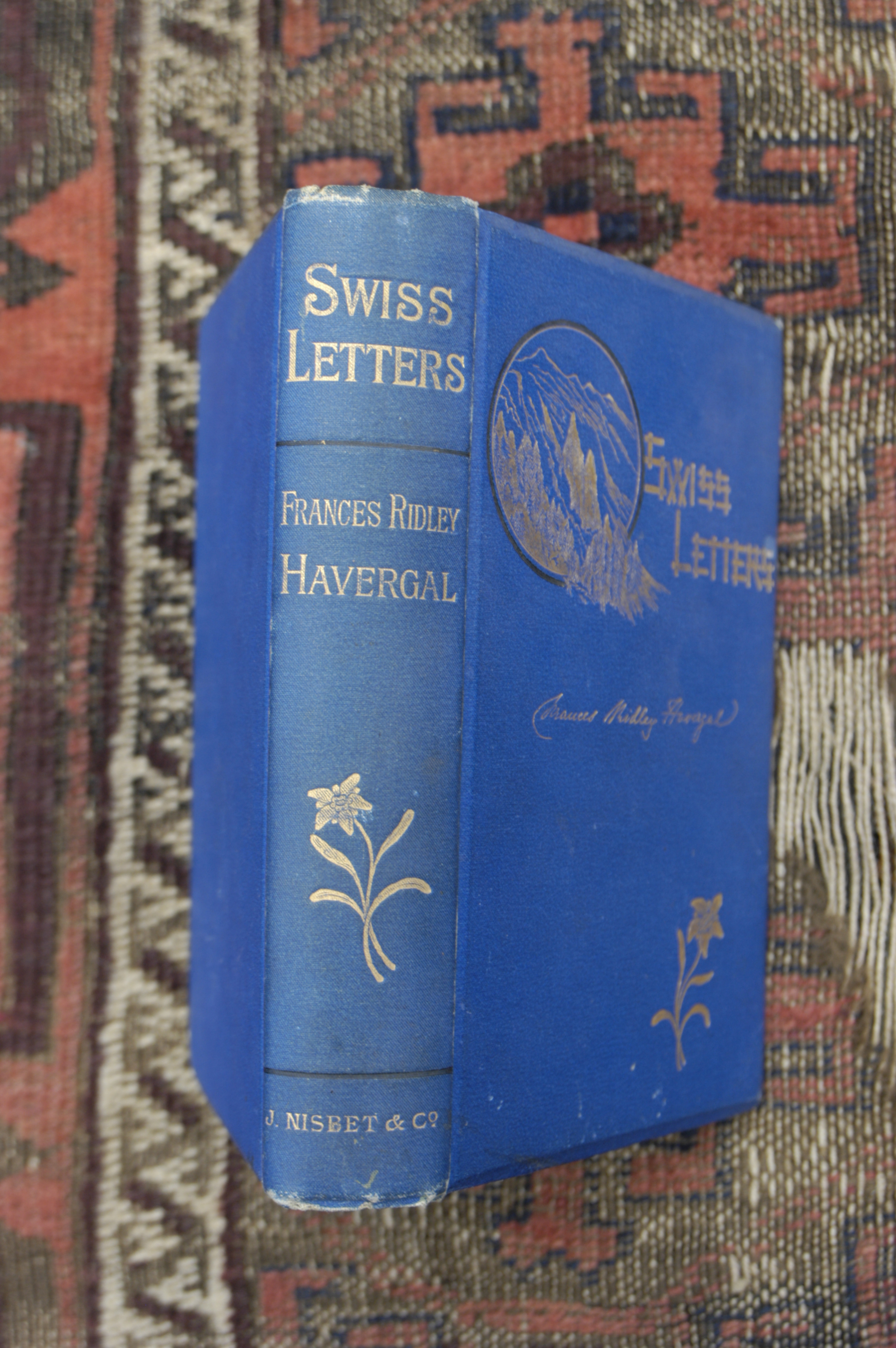
Swiss Letters, 1881

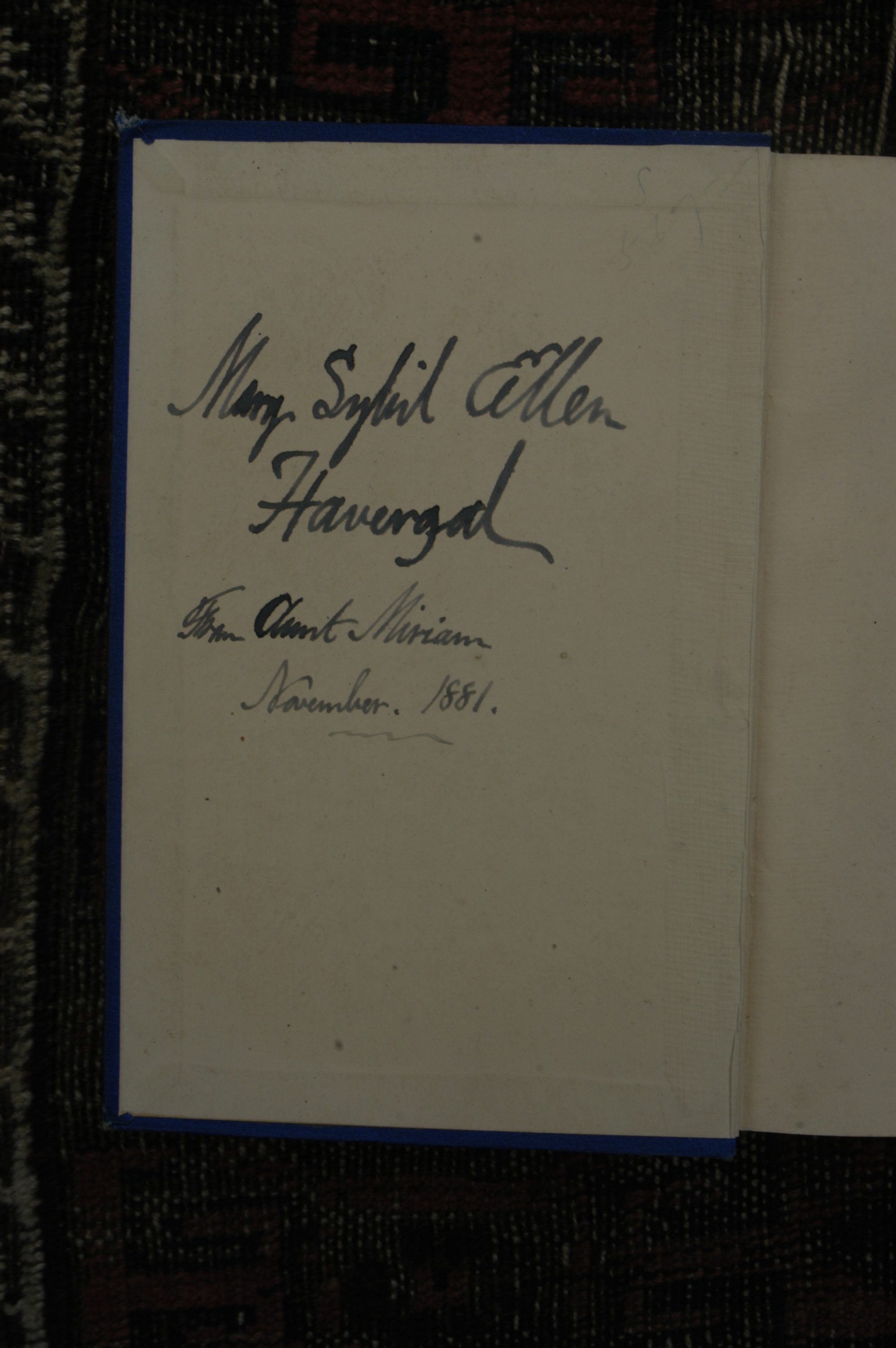
Inscribed and signed copy of Swiss Letters, 1881.

=== Illustrations ===
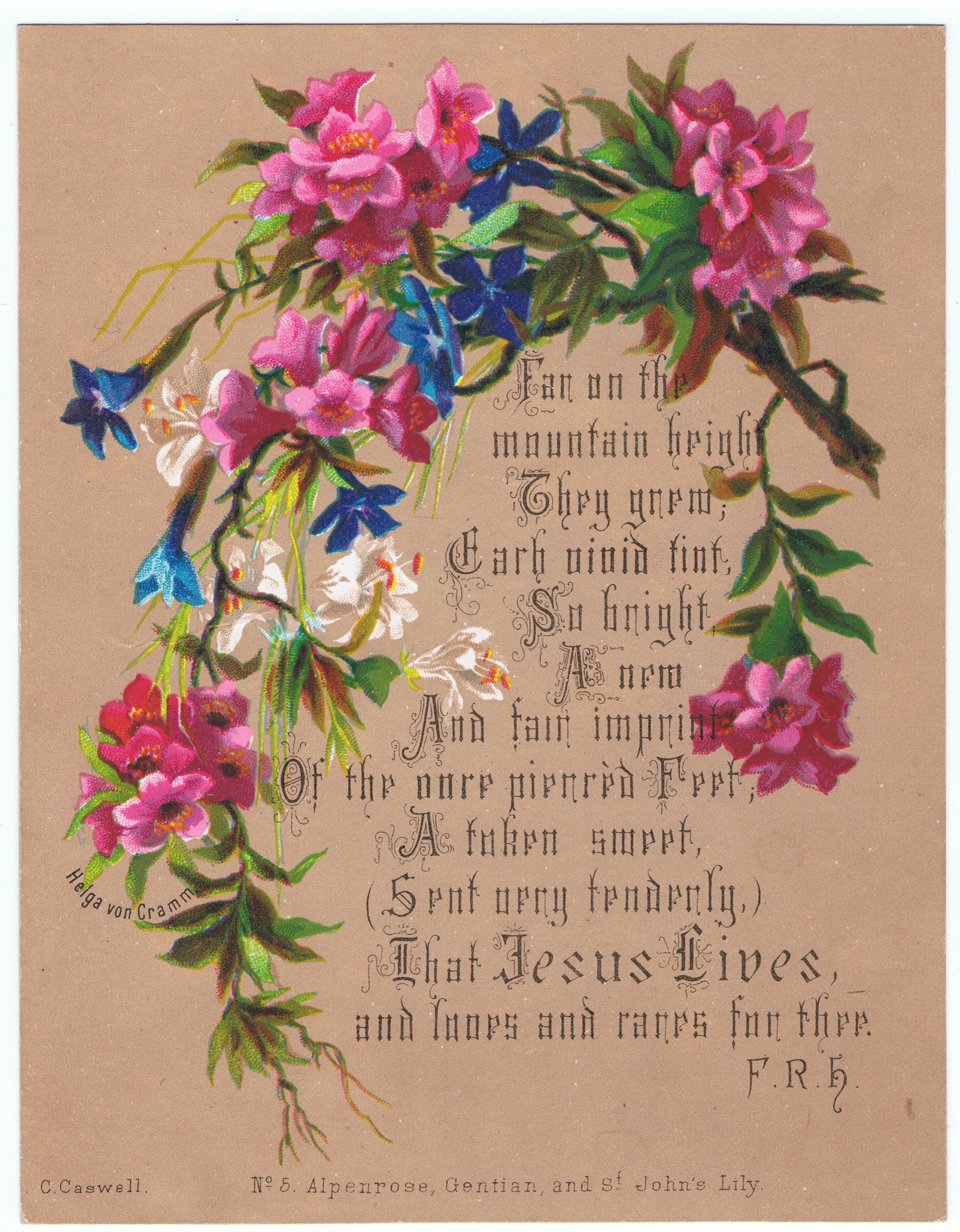
Havergal prayer on a Helga von Cramm chromolithograph, (No. 5. Alpenrose, Gentian, and St. John's Lily).

Bright be thy Christmas tide! Carol it far and wide, ..., words by F.R. Havergal, floral design by Helga von Cramm, c. 1880.

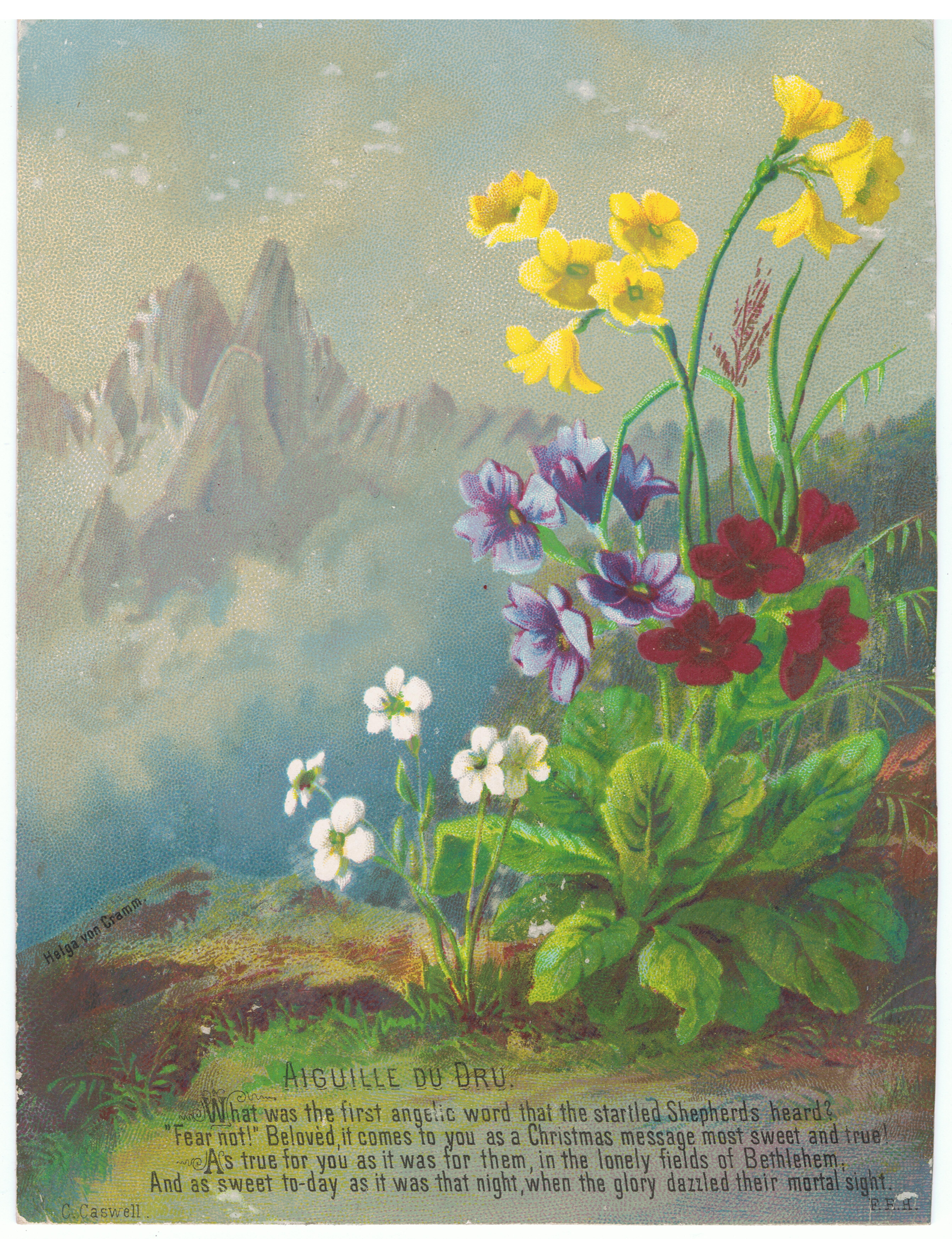
Aiguille du Dru, chromolithograph by Helga von Cramm, with F.R. Havergal verse, 1870s.

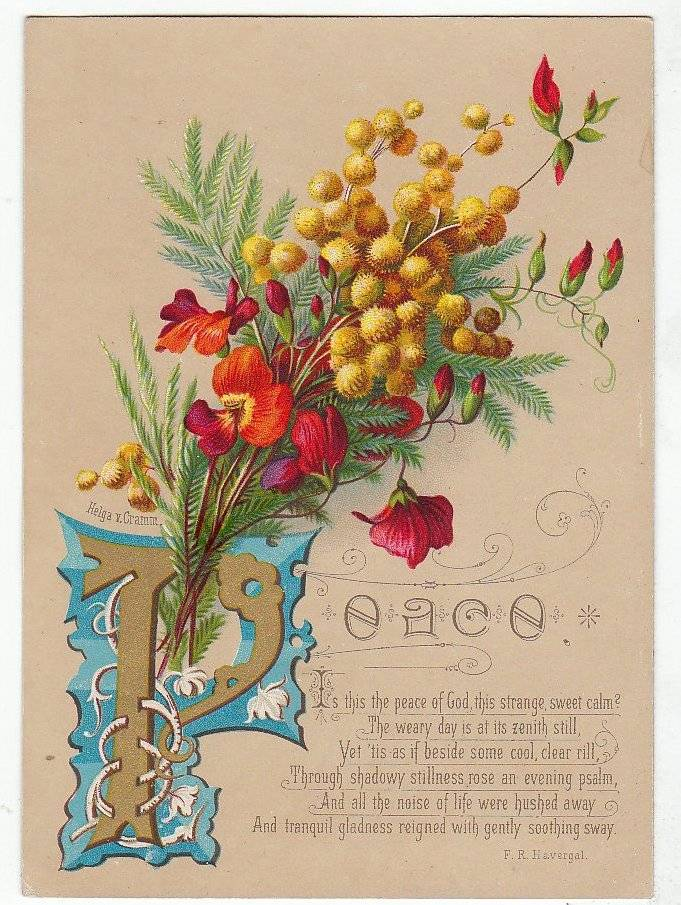
Peace.

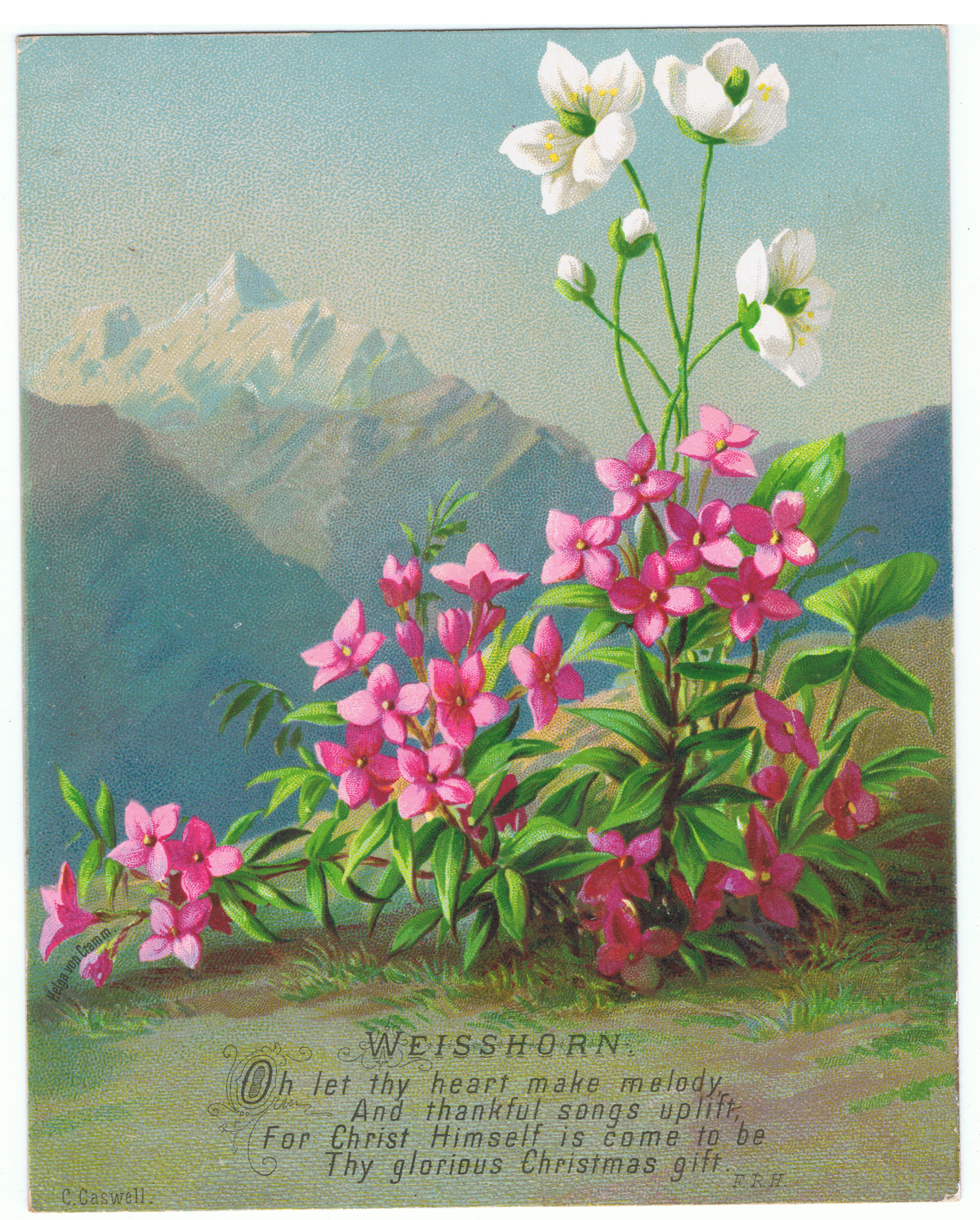
Weisshorn and flowers.

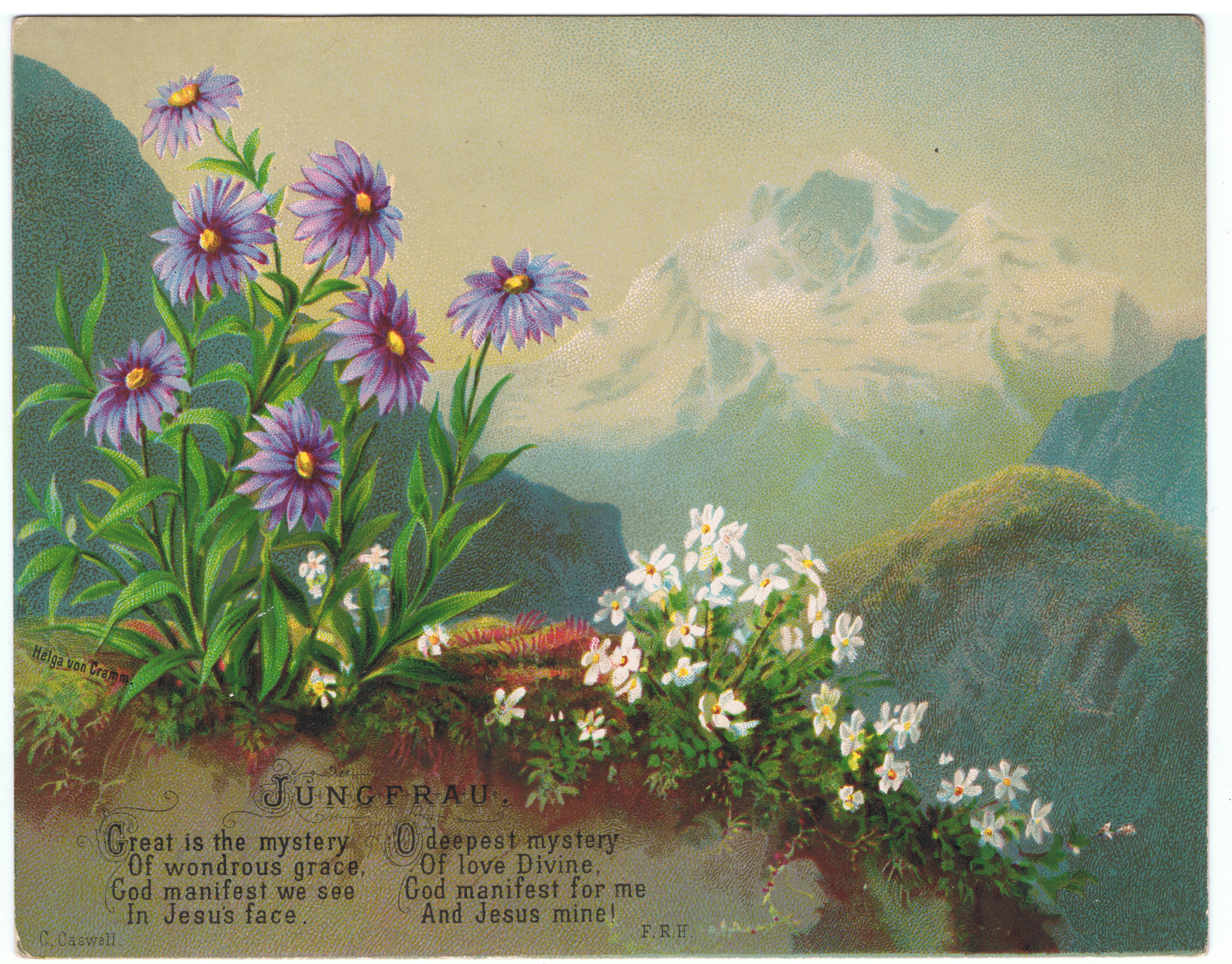
Jungfrau.

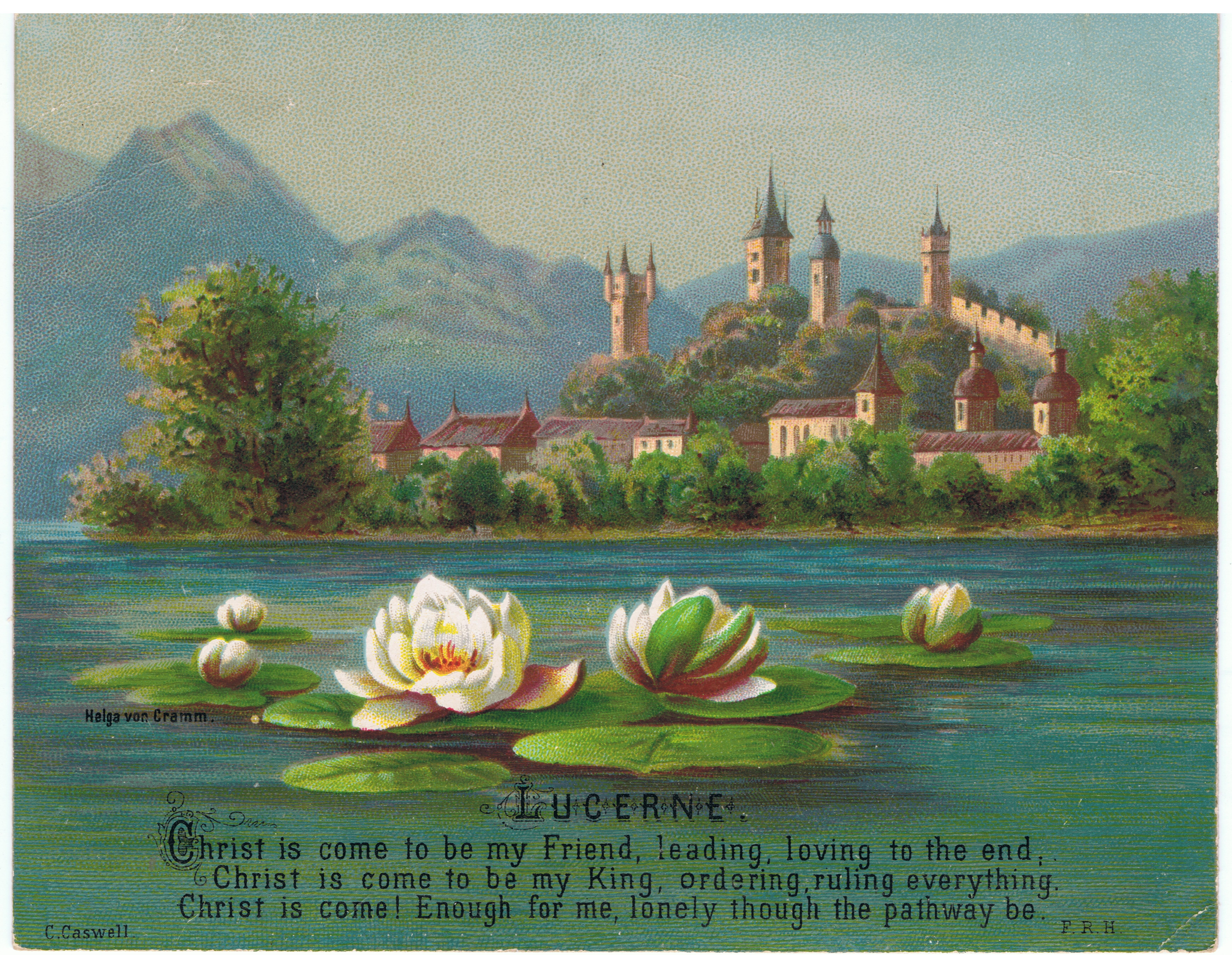
Lucerne.

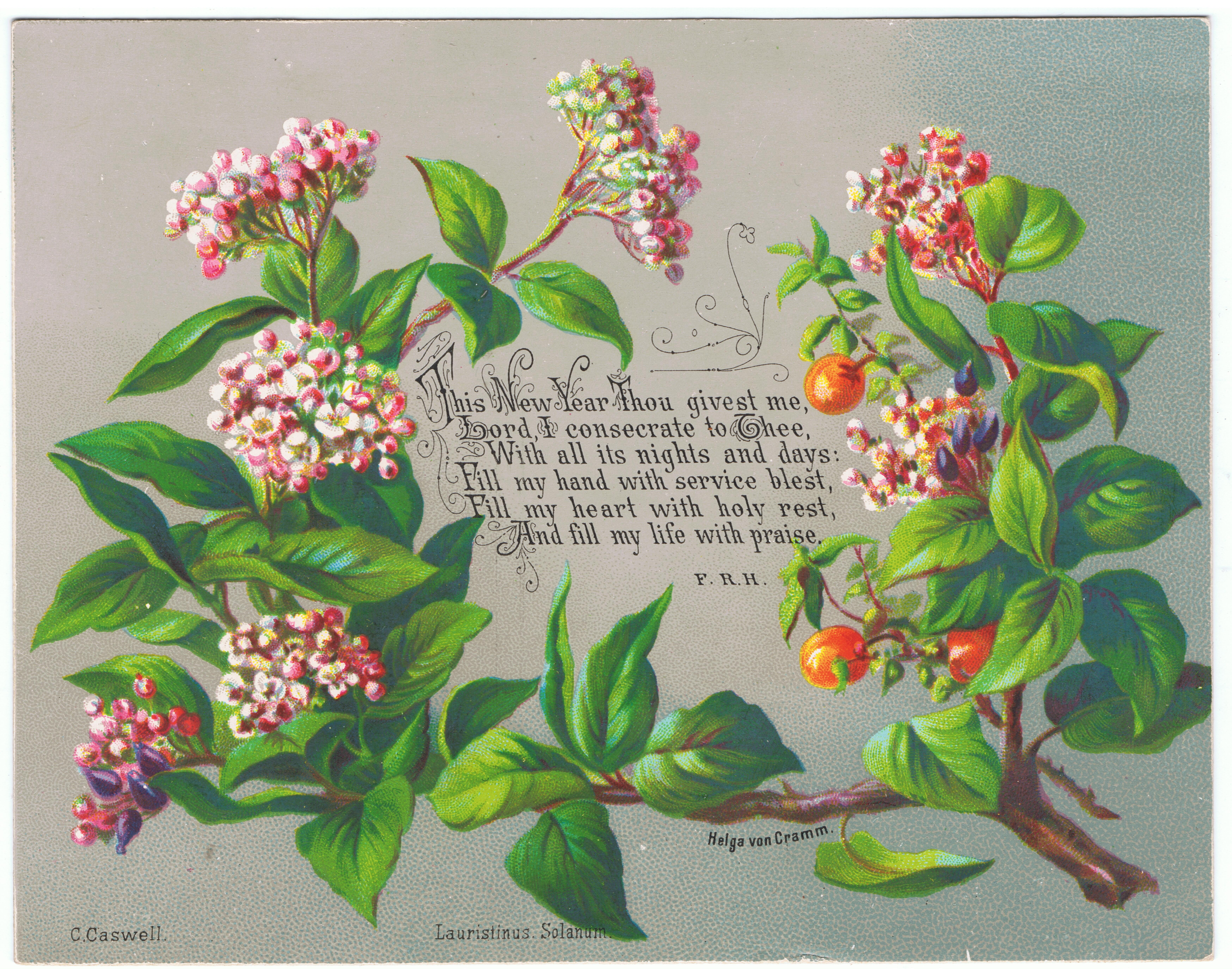
New Year card featuring a Lauristinus (Viburnum tinus) and Solanum.

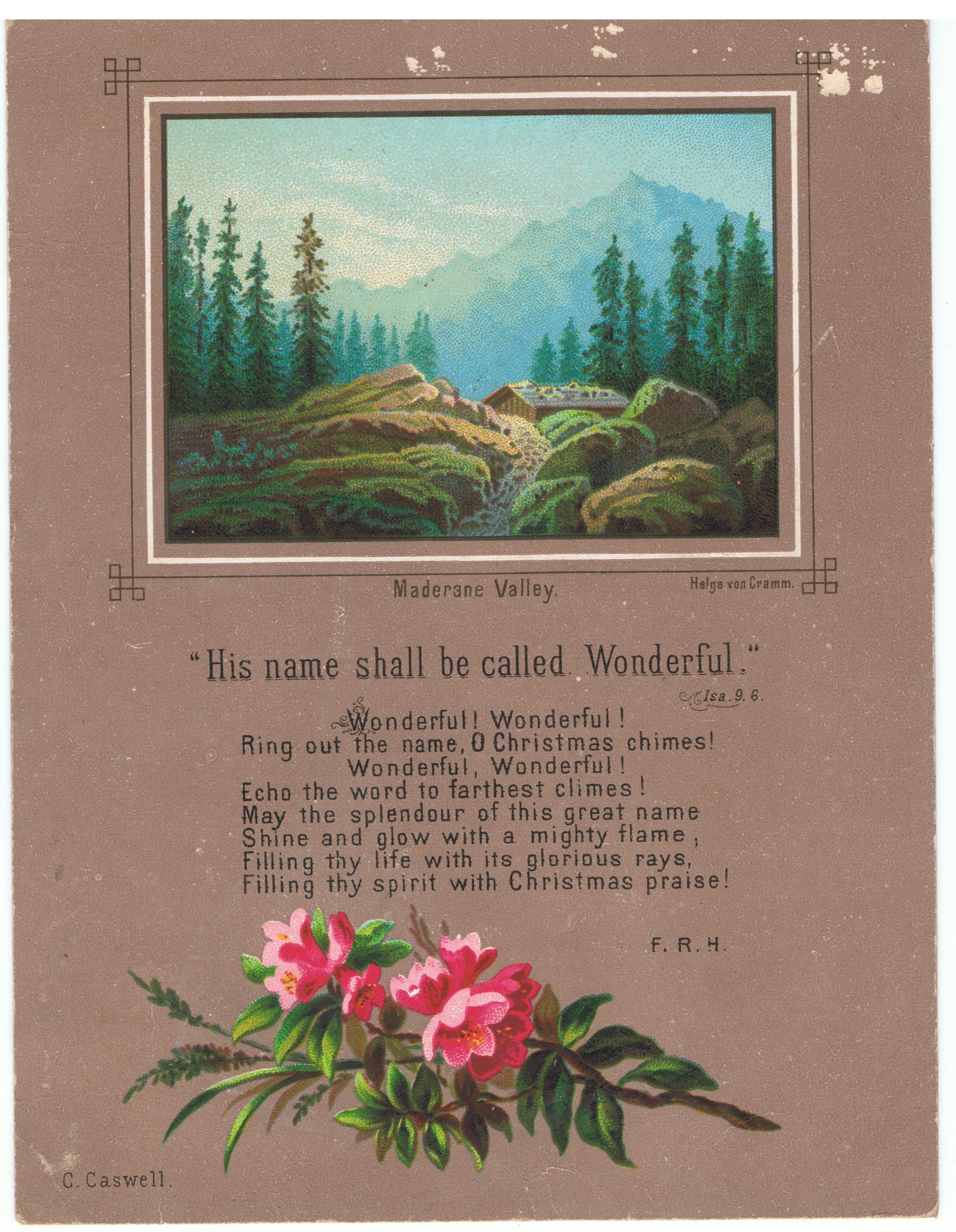
Maderane Valley, Christmas card.

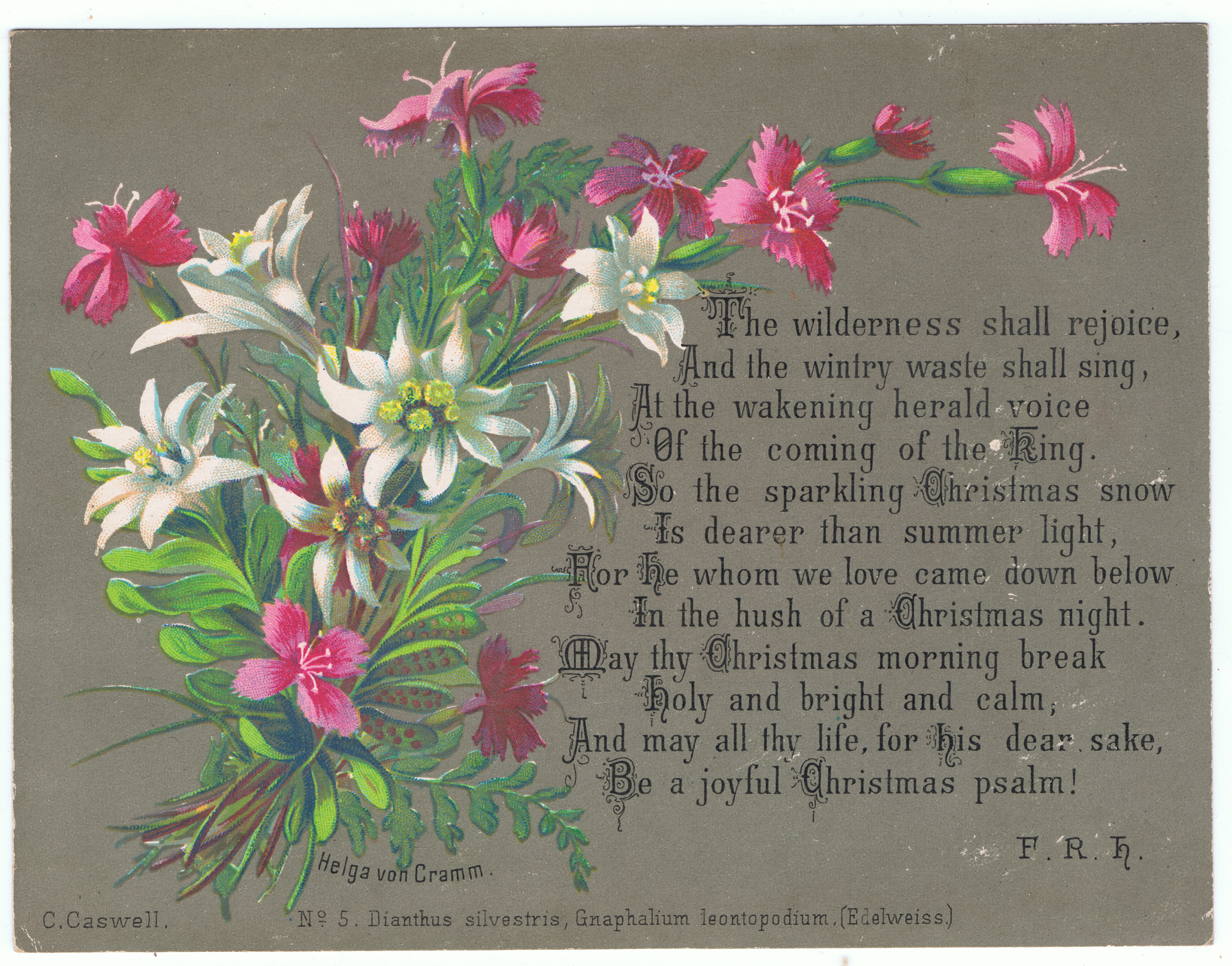
Havergall prayer, circa 1877.

== See also ==
English women hymnwriters (18th to 19th-century)

- Eliza Sibbald Alderson
- Sarah Bache
- Charlotte Alington Barnard
- Sarah Doudney
- Charlotte Elliott
- Ada R. Habershon
- Katherine Hankey
- Maria Grace Saffery
- Anne Steele
- Emily Taylor
- Emily H. Woodmansee
