= Anne Steele =

English Baptist hymnwriter and essayist

- Born: 1717; Broughton, Hampshire, England
- Died: 11 November 1778 (aged 60–61); Broughton
- Resting place: St John the Baptist's Church cemetery
- Occupations: hymnwriter, essayist
- Writing career
- Pen name: Theodosia
- Language: English
- Subject: Christianity

Anne Steele (pen name, Theodosia; 1717 – 11 November 1778) was an English Baptist hymnwriter and essayist. For a full century after her death, she filled a larger place in United States and British hymnals than any other woman.

At an early age, Steele showed a taste for literature, and would often entertain her friends with her poetical compositions. To a fervour of devotion, which increased as she got older, she developed a fondness for sacred literature, which led her to compose a considerable number of pieces in prose and verse. These works were published using the pseudonym, "Theodosia". Portions of these spiritual lyrics soon found their way into collections, while the diffidence of the author because of her pen name, left her comparatively unknown beyond the circle of her personal friends.

In 1760, two volumes, appeared under the title of Poems on Subjects chiefly Devotional, by Theodosia. After her death, which occurred in 1778, a new edition was published with an additional volume and a Preface by the Rev. Dr. Caleb Evans of Bristol (Bristol, 1780). In the three volumes, there are 144 hymns, 34 Psalms in verse, and about 30 short poems. They were reprinted in one volume by D. Sedgwick, 1863. Steele's hymns were first made available for congregational use in 1769, 62 of them being then introduced into the Bristol Baptist Collections of Ash & Evans, the letter T for "Theodosia" being affixed; 47 were also given in Dr. Rippon's Selections, 1787, and 26 in Dr. W. B. Collyer's Collections, 1812. The original edition of "Theodosia"'s works are kept in the Library of the Baptist College, Bristol.

== Early years ==
Anne ("Nanny") Steele was born at Broughton, Hampshire, in 1717. She was descended from a family of Puritans. Her father, William Steele, was the minister of a community of Baptists, and he himself was descended from preachers. At an early age, Steele manifested a pious disposition, and at the age of fourteen, had become a member of the church of which her father was pastor. Owing to an accident in childhood, she was always an invalid, and often confined to her chamber.

== Career ==
Steele discovered in early life her love of the Muses, and often entertained her friends with her poetical and pious writing. But it was not without extreme reluctance that she finally submitted any of them to be read by the public. Her father's diary mentions Steele's first publication in 1757:— "1757, Nov. 29. This day Nanny sent a part of her compositions to London to be printed." Again: "Her brother brought with him her poetry, not yet bound." Steele's stepmother, the second Mrs. Steele, shared the father's admiration, but they were anxious that any public expression of Steele's abilities as a writer should not injure her character. They prayed that she would remain humble. It was not till she was 44 that she consented to the publication of her hymns, that they might be available for public use.

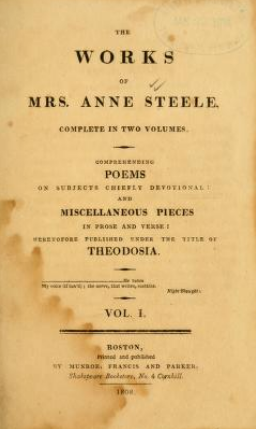
"The works of Mrs. Anne Steele", 1808

In 1760, she published Poems on Subjects Chiefly Devotional under the name Theodosia. This book had a second edition (3 vols. Bristol, 1780), for which Caleb Evans wrote a preface. Her complete works were published in one volume by Daniel Sedgwick (London, 1863), as Hymns, Psalms, and Poems by Anne Steele, with a memoir by John Sheppard. It comprised 144 hymns, thirty-four metrical psalms and fifty moral poems. Some of them, e.g. "Father of mercies, in Thy word," have found their way into the collections of other churches. She has been called the Frances Ridley Havergal of the 18th century. Several of Anne Steele's hymns appear in the Sacred Harp. In 1780, a new edition of the Poems, comprising a third and posthumous volume of Miscellanies, was published by Dr. Caleb Evans, the profits of which were to be given to the "Bristol Education Society", also known as the Baptist College of Bristol, of which he was at that time President; to that volume, the Editor prefixed a biography of "Mrs. Steele", as she was more commonly called.

A Selection of Hymns for Public Worship, a hymn book compiled by William Gadsby and first published in 1814, includes twenty-seven of the hymns by Anne Steele. This book is used mainly by some of the Calvinistic Strict Baptist churches in England. Steele, like the Welsh poet, William Williams Pantycelyn, wrote missionary hymns before modern missionary and Bible societies were established. She also wrote a well-known Sunday school hymn before Sunday schools were established.

== Personal life ==
It has often been written that the drowning of her betrothed, Robert Elscourt, a few hours before the time fixed for her marriage, deeply affected an otherwise quiet life. However, modern research refutes the details of this story. One man did ask for the hand of Anne Steele, in 1742. This was Benjamin Beddome, but she turned him down, and remained unmarried.

Steele loved the retirement of her Hampshire home. A quiet life suited her best. She said of herself:— "I enjoy a calm evening on the terrace walk, and I wish, though in vain, for numbers sweet as the lovely prospect, and gentle as the vernal breeze, to describe the beauties of charming spring; but the reflection how soon these blooming pleasures will vanish, spreads a melancholy gloom, till the mind rises by a delightful transition to the celestial Eden—the scenes of undecaying pleasure and immutable perfection." She sometimes wrote hymns on creation and providence; and although these lack the powerful originality of those of classical hymnists, they were full of warm, tender, thankful feeling.

Always of a delicate constitution, it appears that Steele's habits were very reclusive. For many years, she was confined to her room because of illness, during which period, she was engaged in writing essays, principally of a religious nature, in prose and verse. In 1769, Steele's father died, and it is said that she never recovered from the shock. After the death of her father, she spent the remaining nine years of her life in the house of her brother, William, which he had built very near the old family home. Unlike most authors of her day, Steele was in a financial position which enabled her to devote the profits of her books to religious and charitable uses, and the same course was pursued by her surviving relatives.

No portrait of Steele was ever made. She died in her native village, on 11 November 1778, at the age of 62, and was interred in the family vault at Broughton Church cemetery.

== Style ==
Steele's hymns included class religious terms, which had a charm to those familiar with them, and who belonged to the "favoured" class, but had an unpleasant technical character to the ordinary reader. For example, the words 'dear' and 'dearest' were used till they seemed weak, and wearied the reader.

== Themes ==
Steele's hymns, which were much used by Baptists, emphasized the less optimistic phases of Christian experience. Among Baptist hymnwriters, Steele stood at the head, if regarded either by the number of her hymns which found a place in the hymnals of the nineteenth century, or the frequency with which they were sung. Although few of them could be placed in the first rank of lyrical compositions, they were almost uniformly simple in language, natural and pleasing in imagery, and full of genuine Christian feeling. Steele may not inappropriately be compared with Frances Ridley Havergal. In both, there was the same evangelic fervour, in both the same intense personal devotion to Jesus. But whilst Steele seemed to think of Him more frequently as her "bleeding, dying Lord"—dwelling on His sufferings in their physical aspect, Havergal more often referred to His living help and sympathy, recognized with gladness His present claims as "Master" and "King," and anticipated almost with ecstasy His second coming. Looking at the whole of Steele's hymns, there is a wider range of thought than in Miss Havergal's compositions. Steele treats a greater variety of subjects.

== Selected works ==
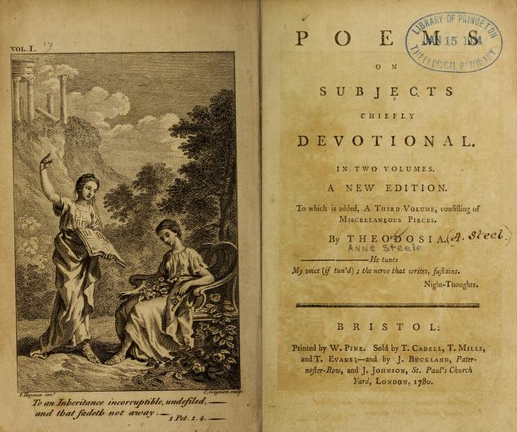
"Poems on subjects chiefly devotional" (vol.1, 1780)

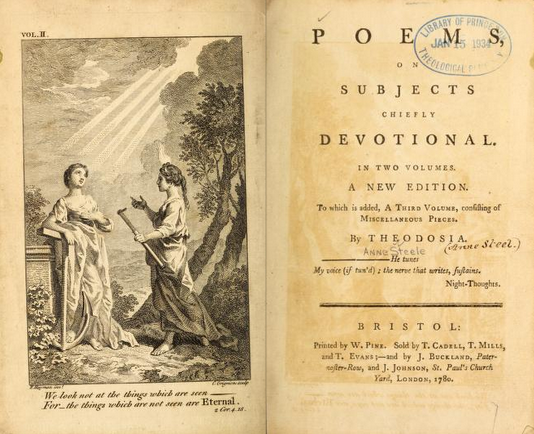
Poems on subjects chiefly devotional (vol. 2, 1780)

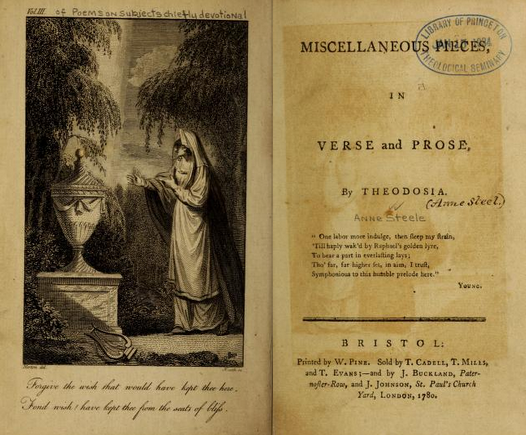
Miscellaneous Pieces in Verse and Prose by Theodosia

- Poems on subjects chiefly devotional, 2 volumes
- Miscellaneous Pieces in Verse and Prose by Theodosia
- The works of Mrs. Anne Steele

== See also ==
English women hymn-writers (18th to 19th-century)

- Eliza Sibbald Alderson
- Sarah Bache
- Charlotte Alington Barnard
- Sarah Doudney
- Charlotte Elliott
- Ada R. Habershon
- Katherine Hankey
- Maria Grace Saffery
- Emily Taylor
- Emily H. Woodmansee
