= Emily H. Woodmansee =

American poet

Emily Hill Woodmansee (March 24, 1836 – October 18, 1906) was an English-born American Mormon poet and hymnwriter. Although only one of her hymns "As Sisters In Zion" is included in the 1985 LDS English language edition of the LDS Church's hymnbook, previous LDS Church hymnbooks have included more of her works.

== Early life ==
Emily Hill was born at Warminster, Wiltshire, England and was introduced to the Church of Jesus Christ of Latter-day Saints (LDS Church) when she was twelve. Among those who she would walk to church with at this point was Edward Tullidge. Her family initially opposed her joining the church but through the efforts of John Halliday they were reconciled with the notion enough for her to be baptized.

Portrait of Emily Woodmansee and her sister, Julia Hill Ivins

In 1856 Emily and her sister Julia sailed for the United States aboard the Thornton in the Latter-day Saint company under James G. Willie. The Hill girls crossed the plains in the Willie Handcart Company.

== Marriage and children ==
In 1857, Emily married Dr. William G. Mills. He later left on a mission to England. After returning to the United States with money he had raised from church members in England, he denounced the church and abandoned his families; Emily never saw him again.

In 1864, she married Joseph Woodmansee. They had eight children together and one adopted daughter named Allie Bray.

== Pursuits ==
Woodmansee wrote a "Hand-cart Song" that captured the cheerful mood of the Saints as they started westward. Woodmansee wrote a poem about the sufferings in the handcart experience, drawing from her firsthand knowledge, in 1881. Woodmansee wrote a poem for the "Mormon" Women's Protest of March 6, 1886 against the Edmunds–Tucker Act. Woodmansee wrote the Jubilee hymn for the Sunday School. Her works were published in the Improvement Era, the Young Woman's Journal and the Women's Exponent.

She served as the treasurer for the Women's Cooperative Store and was involved in the Women's Suffrage Movement. Woodmansee was involved in the real estate business in Salt Lake City, Utah.

== Legacy ==
- The 1927 LDS Church hymnbook contained eight of Woodmansee's hymns. One of these was "O the Daughters of Zion, The Friends of the Poor".
- One of her poems was featured in the 1941 Relief Society Centennial Anthology of Verse by Latter-day Saint women.
- The 1948 hymnal had two hymns by Woodmansee, "Up! Arouse Thee, O Beautiful Zion" (with music by Leroy J. Robertson) and "When Dark and Drear the Skies Appear". "As Sisters in Zion" (with music by Janice Kapp Perry) was for the first time published as a hymn in 1985.
- A compilation of Woodmansee's poetry was published in 1986.
- In 2004, some of her poems were republished in Discoveries: Two Centuries of Poems by Mormon Women published by the Joseph Fielding Smith Institute for Latter-day Saint History at Brigham Young University.

== See also ==
English women hymnwriters (18th to 19th-century)

- Eliza Sibbald Alderson
- Sarah Bache
- Charlotte Alington Barnard
- Sarah Doudney
- Charlotte Elliott
- Ada R. Habershon
- Katherine Hankey
- Frances Ridley Havergal
- Maria Grace Saffery
- Anne Steele
- Emily Taylor
