= Sarah Doudney =

English novelist and hymnwriter (1841–1926)

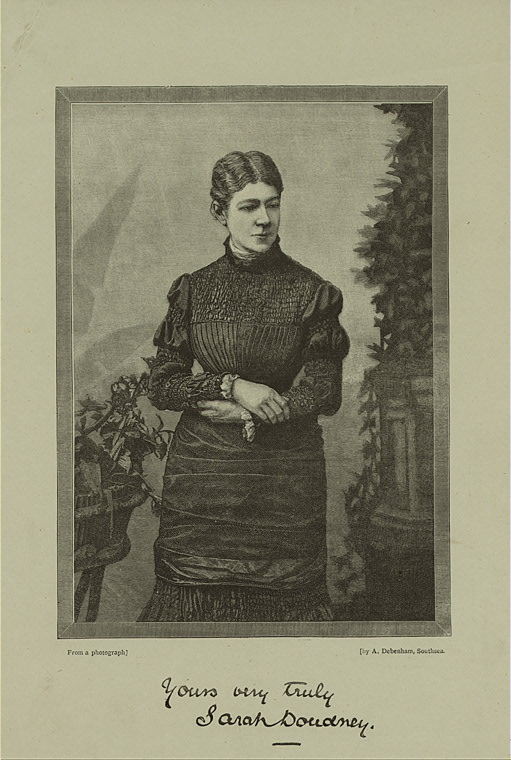
Sarah Doudney (an inscription signed by Doudney appears beneath the portrait engraving).

Sarah Doudney (15 January 1841, Portsea, Portsmouth, Hampshire – 8 December 1926, Oxford) was an English fiction writer and poet. She is best known for her children's literature and her hymns.

== Family and life ==
Doudney's father ran a candle and soap-making business. One of her uncles was the evangelical clergyman David Alfred Doudney, editor of The Gospel Magazine and Old Jonathan. Doudney was educated at a school for French girls, and started to write poetry and prose as a child. "The Lesson of the Water-Mill", written when she was 15 and published in the Anglican Churchman's Family Magazine (1864), became a well-known song in Britain and the United States. Doudney continued to live with her parents near Catherington until she was 30.

Doudney's first novel, Under Grey Walls, appeared in 1871. Success came with her third, Archie's Old Desk, in 1872. In the 1881 census Doudney described herself as a "Writer for Monthly Journals". She contributed poetry and fiction to periodicals that included Dickens's All the Year Round, the Churchman's Shilling Magazine, the Religious Tract Society's Girl's Own Paper, The Sunday Magazine, Good Words and The Quiver. By 1891, when she described herself in the census as a novelist, she had written about 35 novels. Most of these were written for young girls, but she also wrote some for adults. Many of them end tragically, but look forward to happiness after death. Anna Cavaye, or, The Ugly Princess tells of a dying child comforted by knowing she has brought other people together.

Doudney's hymns include The Christian's Good Night, set by Ira D. Sankey in 1884 and sung at Charles Spurgeon's funeral.

Sarah's mother Lucy Doudney died in 1891 and her father in 1893. Sarah Doudney then moved to Oxford, where she died in December 1926.

== Selected works ==
- The Angels of Christmas, 1870
- Harvest Hymn, 1870
- Psalms of Life, 1871. A collection of 60 hymns.
- Under Gray Walls, 1871
- Faith Harrowby: Or the Smugglers' Cave, 1871
- Archie's Old Desk, 1872
- Self-pleasing. A New Year's Address to Senior Scholars, 1872
- The Beautiful Island, and Other Stories (the other stories by other authors), 1872
- Loser and Gainer, 1873
- Janet Darney. A Tale of Fisher-life in Thale Bay, 1873
- Wave upon Wave, 1873
- Marion's Three Crowns, 1873
- The Cottage in the Woods, and other tales, 1874
- Miss Irving's Bible, 1875
- Oliver's Oath, and How He Kept It, 1875
- The Great Salterns, 1875
- Nothing But Leaves, 1875
- The Pilot's Daughters, 1875
- Brave Seth, 1877
- Stories of Girlhood, or the Brook and the River, 1877
- Monksbury College: A Tale of Schoolgirl Life, 1878
- Faith's Revenge, 1879
- The Scarlet Satin Petticoat, 1879
- While It Is Day. A New Year's Address to Senior Scholars, 1879
- A Story of Crossport, and Other Stories, 1879
- Old Anthony's Secret, and Other Stories, 1879
- Stepping Stones, a Story of our Inner Life, 1880
- Strangers Yet. A Story, 1880
- A Child of the Precinct, 1880
- Stepping-Stones: A Story of Our Inner Life, 1880
- Anna Cavaye; or, the Ugly Princess, 1882
- Michaelmas Daisy. A Young Girl's Story, 1882
- What's in a Name?, 1883
- Miss Stepney's Fortune, 1883
- Nelly Channell, 1883
- A Woman's Glory, 1883
- The Strength of Her Youth, 1884
- A Long Lane with a Turning, 1884
- When We Two Parted. A Tale, c. 1884
- Prudence Winterburn, 1885
- Who Is the Enemy? and How He Was Discovered. A tale, 1886
- When We Were Girls Together, 1886
- The Missing Rubies, 1887
- A Son of the Morning, 1887
- Thy Heart's Desire. A Story of Girls' Lives, 1888
- Miss Willowburn's Offer, 1888
- The Vicar of Redcross; Or, Till Death Us Do Part, 1888
- Under False Colours, 1889
- Where the Dew Falls in London. A Story of a Sanctuary, 1889
- Christmas Angels (in verse), 1890
- The Family Difficulty: The Story of a Young Samaritan, 1891
- Godiva Durleigh, 1891
- Where Two Ways Meet, etc., 1891
- Drifting Leaves (poems), 1892
- My Message (poem), 1892
- Voices in the Starlight (poem), 1892
- The Love-Dream of Gatty Fenning. A Tale, 1892
- Through Pain to Peace, 1892
- A Romance Of Lincoln's Inn, 1893
- Violets for Faithfulness (verse), 1893
- Louie's Married Life, 1894
- Katherine's Keys. A Tale, 1896
- A Vanished Hand, 1896
- Bitter and Sweet. A Story, 1896
- Pilgrims of the Night, 1897
- 'Where Swallows Build' at the Wayback Machine (archived 26 October 2009), Girl's Own Paper, XX, 1898
- Lady Dye's Reparation, 1901
- Silent Strings, 1904
- One of the Few, 1904
- A Cluster of Roses, 1906
- Shadow and Shine, 1906
- When My Ship Comes Home, 1906
- Thistle-Down
- My Wish for Thee (single poem)
- The Lesson of the Water Mill (with Bond Andrews)

== See also ==
English women hymnwriters (18th–19th centuries)

- Eliza Sibbald Alderson
- Sarah Bache
- Charlotte Alington Barnard
- Charlotte Elliott
- Ada R. Habershon
- Katherine Hankey
- Frances Ridley Havergal
- Maria Grace Saffery
- Anne Steele
- Emily Taylor
- Emily H. Woodmansee
