= Katherine Hankey =

English evangelist, poet and hymnwriter

Arabella Katherine Hankey
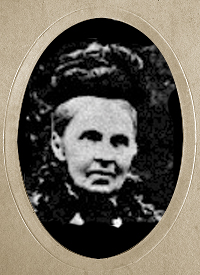
- Arabella Katherine Hankey
- Born: 12 January 1834; London, England
- Died: 9 May 1911 (aged 77)
- Occupations: Missionary, Nurse, Poet
- Notable work: "The Old, Old Story"

Arabella Katherine Hankey (12 January 1834 – 9 May 1911) was an English missionary and nurse who is best known for being the author of the poem The Old, Old Story, from which the hymns "Tell me the old, old story" and "I Love to Tell the Story" were derived.

== Biography ==
Hankey was born in 1834, the daughter of a prosperous banker in London. Her family were devout Anglicans and members of the Clapham Sect. She was inspired by the Methodist revival of John Wesley and organised and taught in Sunday schools in London. She then did missionary work as a nurse in South Africa, assisting her brother.

In 1866, she had a serious illness and was bedridden for a long convalescence. During this time, Hankey wrote her long poem, titled Tell me the Old, Old Story of unseen things above, with 50 verses in two parts: The Story Wanted and The Story Told. Hankey's masterpiece was put to music by the American composer William Howard Doane.

She recovered from the illness and lived to the age of 77, dying in 1911.

== See also ==
English women hymnwriters (18th to 19th-century)

- Eliza Sibbald Alderson
- Sarah Bache
- Charlotte Alington Barnard
- Sarah Doudney
- Charlotte Elliott
- Ada R. Habershon
- Frances Ridley Havergal
- Maria Grace Saffery
- Anne Steele
- Emily Taylor
- Emily H. Woodmansee
