= Emily Taylor =

English hymnist and author (1795–1872)

Emily Howson Taylor
- Born: 7 April 1795; Banham, Norfolk, England
- Died: 11 March 1872 (aged 76); St Pancras, London, England
- Occupations: Schoolmistress, writer
- Relatives: Edgar Taylor (brother)
- Writing career
- Language: English

Emily Taylor (7 April 1795 – 11 March 1872) was an English schoolmistress, poet, children's author, and hymnist. She wrote numerous tales for children, chiefly historical, along with books of instruction and some descriptive natural history.

== Early life and education ==
Emily Howson Taylor was born in 1795, in Banham, Norfolk. She was the daughter of Samuel Taylor, of New Buckenham, Norfolk, a niece of John Taylor, of Norwich, a hymn writer, and a great-granddaughter of Dr John Taylor, a Hebraist. Her brother Edgar Taylor was also a writer and translator. Her mother died shortly after she was born, so that she was brought up by her father, five brothers, one sister and two aunts. At the age of seven, she caught scarlet fever. As a result, she became partly deaf after and could not attend formal schooling.

== Career ==
When she moved with her father to nearby New Buckenham, she started a school for some 30 children, which laid emphasis on singing, partly because Taylor had become friendly with Sarah Ann Glover, a musical theorist who had developed the Norwich sol-fa system.

In 1825, she published The Vision of Las Casas, and Other Poems. The title poem, about a vision of the dying Bartolomé de las Casas, has an anti-slavery theme. Las Casas' vision ends with his being granted a prophetic glimpse of the abolitionist movement in Taylor's own time, with specific mentions of Thomas Clarkson and William Wilberforce.

Taylor moved up to London in 1842, to live with a widowed sister and continued to teach. Taylor wrote numerous historical tales, works of instruction for children, and popular biographies, including The Ball I Live On, or, Sketches of the Earth and Chronicles of an Old English Oak, or Sketches of English Life and History. Works of hers appeared in the Monthly Repository among other publications. Originally a Unitarian, she joined the Church of England under the influence of English theologian Frederick Denison Maurice.

Taylor's other publications include Letters to a Child on Maritime Discovery(1820), Poetical Illustrations of Passages of Scripture (1826), Tales of the Saxons (1832), Tales of the English (1833), Memoir of Sir T[homas] More (1834) and The Boy and the Birds (1835). In addition she edited Sabbath. Recreations (1826) and Flowers and Fruit in old English Gardens (1836), and contributed to the Magnet Stories (1860) and the Rainbow Stories (1870).

=== Hymn-writer ===
Taylor also wrote many hymns that remained popular through the 19th century, including 14 contributed anonymously to a Unitarian hymnal published in 1818. Taylor's other hymns appeared as follows:

To the Unitarian Collection of Psalms & Hymns for the Renshaw Street Chapel, Liverpool (1818) she contributed anonymously:

1. "Come to the house of prayer" – an invitation to public worship sometimes given as "O come to the house of Prayer"
2. "God of the changing year Whose arm of power" – lessons of the changing year
3. "O Father, though the anxious fear" – for Sunday
4. "O here, if ever, God of love" – for Holy Communion

These and the following six hymns were contributed anonymously to the second edition of the Norwich Unitarian Hymn Book, 1826:

1. "Here, Lord, when at Thy Table met" – Holy Communion.
2. "O not for these alone I pray" – Holy Communion, sometimes as "No, not for these alone I pray"
3. "The Gospel is the light" – the worth and power of the Gospel, sometimes as "It is the one true light"
4. "Thus shalt thou love the Almighty God [Lord]" – self-consecration to God
5. "Who shall behold the King of kings?" – purity
6. "Who that o'er many a barren part" – missions, sometimes beginning with the second stanza "Thy kingdom come! The heathen lands"

Of these, No. 6 belongs to a longer poem in her Poetical Illustrations of Passages of Scripture (1826), which also contains:

1. "O Source of good around me spread" – seek, and ye shall find
2. "Truly the light of morn is sweet" – early piety
3. "When summer suns their radiance fling" – resignation with praise

Rev. John Relly Beard's Collection of Hymns for Public and Private Worship (1837) repeats several of these and also has:

1. "If love, the noblest, purest, best" – Communion with Jesus

Of these 14 hymns, ten recur in Dr James Martineau's Hymns (1840) and nine in his Hymns (1873). Several appear in other collections, such as William Garrett Horder's Congregational Hymnody (1884) and in some American and other hymn books.

Emily Taylor died on 11 March 1872 in St Pancras, London.

== See also ==
English women hymnists (18th to 19th century)

- Eliza Sibbald Alderson
- Sarah Bache
- Charlotte Alington Barnard
- Sarah Doudney
- Charlotte Elliott
- Ada R. Habershon
- Katherine Hankey
- Frances Ridley Havergal
- Maria Grace Saffery
- Anne Steele
- Emily H. Woodmansee
- Sarah Fuller Flower Adams
