= Charlotte Alington Barnard =

British composer and hymnwriter (1830–1869)

Charlotte Alington Pye Barnard (23 December 1830 in Louth, Lincolnshire – 30 January 1869 in Dover) was an English poet and composer of ballads and hymns, who often wrote under the pseudonym Claribel. She wrote over 100 songs as well as two volumes of verse, and became the most commercially successful balled composer managed by her publishers Boosey's, with whom she established one of the first royalty arrangements.

== Life ==
Charlotte Alington Pye was the daughter of Henry Alington Pye, a solicitor, and Charlotte Yerburgh. In 1854, she married Charles Cary Barnard. Though he was parson of St Olaves in Ruckland, Lincolnshire, the couple lived at The Firs in Westgate, Louth, Lincolnshire. After Charlotte's presentation at court in 1856, the couple moved to Pimlico. Among their neighbors was the conductor Michael Costa. In London she studied music with the pianist W.H. Holmes and the singer Charlotte Sainton-Dolby.

On 8 July 1847, Charlotte laid the foundation stone of Louth railway station. During a visit back to Louth in 1862, Charlotte published a collection of poetry entitled Twenty Spring Songs, and sang some of her own compositions at a concert held to clear the debt on the new east window of St James' Church, Louth. A stained glass window in her memory now stands at the west end of the church.

By 1864, she had moved to Kirmington rectory as her husband had been appointed Rector of Brocklesby with Kirmington.

A prolific balladeer and hymn-writer, Barnard had her first public success as a composer in 1859 with the ballad 'Janet's Choice', written for Charlotte Sainton-Dolby. She is probably best known for 'I Cannot Sing the Old Songs', 'Bide A Wee', 'Won't You Tell Me Why, Robin?' (1861), 'Five O'Clock in the Morning' (1862), 'Mountain Mabel' (1865) and 'Come Back to Erin' (1866). She was also the composer of the hymn tune 'Brocklesby'.

In 1868 it was discovered that her much respected father had been systematically stealing money left in his care and trust. He fled to Belgium with his second wife. Charlotte joined him there with her husband but returned to England at the beginning of 1869 for a holiday, when she became ill and died after a short illness from typhoid fever.

== In popular culture ==
- "Come Back to Erin" is one of the songs performed by Michigan J. Frog in the Warner Bros. cartoon One Froggy Evening.
- "Come Back to Erin" is sung by Maureen O'Hara in the 1952 film The Quiet Man.
- A excerpt of "Come Back to Erin" appears in the medley "Songs My Mother Sang" (1918) by Australian composer Harry Taylor

== Selected works ==
Poetry and Prose

- Spring Songs (Louth, 1862)
- Fireside Thoughts, Ballads, Etc. (London, 1865)
- Verses and Songs (London, 1870)
- Thoughts, Verses and Songs (London, 1877)

Hymn Tunes

- BARNARD (Give of Your Best to the Master)
- BROCKELSBY (BROCKELSBURY)
- HALL
- PILGRIMAGE

Ballads and Songs

- "Age"
- "All Along the Valley"
- "Always"
- "Always Speak Kindly" (with SATB chorus, words by Caledon)
- "At Her Window Ho! (Hungarian Love Song)"
- "Blind Alice"
- "Children's Voices"
- "Come Back to Erin"
- "Day Dreams" (duet)
- "Do You Remember?"
- "Dream Land"
- "Far Away in Bonnie Scotland"
- "Farewell to Erin"
- "Firelight"
- "Five O'Clock in the Morning"
- "Friends For Ever"
- "Friendship and Love"
- "Give Him My Last Goodbye" (words by Samuel Callan)
- "Give of Your Best to the Master" (words by Howard Benjamin Gross)
- "Golden Days"
- "Half Mast High"
- "Hidden Voices"
- "Hope" (words from "Recit d'une soeur," adapted by Henry Savile Clarke)
- "Hussar's Parting"
- "I Cannot Sing the Old Songs"
- "I Cannot Wed Another" (words by Samuel Callan)
- "I Leaned Out the Window" (words by Jean Inglelow)
- "I Remember It"
- "Is This All?" (words by Dr. Bonar)
- "I've Found a Home" (words by Dexter Smith)
- "Jamie"
- "Janet's Bridal"
- "Janet's Choice"
- "Kathleen's Answer" (Reply to "Come Back to Erin")
- "Lingering at the Gate" (words by George Birdseye)
- "Little Bird, Little Bird on the Green Tree"
- "Lowland Mary"
- "Maggie's Secret (Oh Many a Time I am Glad at Heart)"
- "Maggie's Test"
- "Maggie's Welcome" (Answer to "Maggie's Secret")
- "Maiden Fair, Maiden Fair"
- "Marion's Song"
- "Milly's Faith"
- "Mountain Mabel"
- "My Brilliant and I"
- "My Heart, My Heart is Over the Sea"
- "Norah's Treasure"
- "November Flowers"
- "O Willow-Tree!"
- "Oh Many a Time I Am Sad at Heart (Maggie's Secret)"
- "Old House on the Hill"
- "Only a Lock of Hair"
- "Only a Year Ago"
- "Our Bud Hs Bloomed in Heaven"
- "Out at Sea"
- "Out on the Rocks" (words by Claribel, music by Madame Sainton Dolby)
- "Poet's Love"
- "Pray For Her" (Priez Pour Elle)"
- "Riding Thro' the Broom"
- "Robin Redbreast"
- "Roses and Daisies"
- "Second Love"
- "Secrets"
- "Silver Chimes"
- "Something to Love"
- "Song of a Boat"
- "Sorrow"
- "Spring-Time" (companion to "Dream Land")
- "Strangers Yet"
- "Susan's Story"
- "Swallow Come Again"
- "Sweet Name of Love" (words by T.W. Henshaw)
- "Take Back the Heart"
- "Tell It Not"
- "The Bells' Whisper"
- "The Blue Alsatian Mountains" (words by Claribel, music by Stephen Adams)
- "The Day of Rest"
- "The Blue Ribbon"
- "The Broken Sixpence"
- "The Brook" (words by Tennyson)
- "The Chimes of St. Mary" (duet for two mezzo-sopranos)
- "The Highland Lassie's Love-Test"
- "The Life Boat"
- "The Love Test"
- "The Old Pink Thorn"
- "The Orphan's Dream"
- "The Passing Bell"
- "The Rose of Erin" (words by Claribel, music by Jules Benedict)
- "The Sailor Boy"
- "The Snow Lies White"
- "The Strife is Over Now"
- "The Two Nests"
- "There's a Silver Lining to Every Cloud"
- "Three O'Clock in the Morning" (temperance song; words anonymous, music by Claribel)
- "Through the Jessamine"
- "Tide Time (Spring Song)" (words by Claribel, music by M.G. Dixon)
- "Voices Holy"
- "Walter's Wooing"
- "We'd Better Bide a Wee"
- "Weep No More, Darling"
- "What Need Have I the Truth to Tell?" (Robin's Reply to "Won't You Tell Me Why?")
- "When I Was Young and Fair"
- "Wherever Thou Art Would Seem Erin To Me"
- "Won't You Tell Me Why, Robin?"
- "Why Can I Not Forego, Forget"
- "Yes, We Must Part"
- "You and I" ("We Sat by the River, You and I")
- "You Came to Me"

Collections

- Sixteen Sacred Songs and Hymns. Words by Dr. H. Bonar, Rev. F Whitefield, Claribel, and others. Music by Claribel. Arranged for one or four voices, pianoforte, harmonium, or organ. (Boosey & Co., 1866)
- The Christmas Rose. Twelve Ballads. (Boosey & Co., 1868)
- Twelve New Ballads. (Boosey's Musical Cabinet, No. 158)
- First Juvenile Album: Sixteen Airs by Claribel and Sullivan easily arranged for the Pianoforte. (Boosey: Cavendish Music Books, No. 14)

== Contemporaries with similar names ==
- Claribel J. Barnard was an American composer. Her compositions for solo piano include "Pansy Blossom Waltz" and "Echoes from Wausepi (Waltz)."
- American songwriter James C. Macy (1845–1918) wrote under various pseudonyms, including "Rosabel." As Rosabel, Mr. Macy authored many sentimental songs and short works for solo piano.

== See also ==
English women hymnwriters (18th to 19th-century)

- Eliza Sibbald Alderson
- Augusta Amherst Austen
- Sarah Bache
- Sarah Doudney
- Charlotte Elliott
- Ada R. Habershon
- Katherine Hankey
- Frances Ridley Havergal
- Maria Grace Saffery
- Anne Steele
- Emily Taylor
- Emily H. Woodmansee
