= Charlotte Elliott =

English poet and hymn writer (1789–1871)

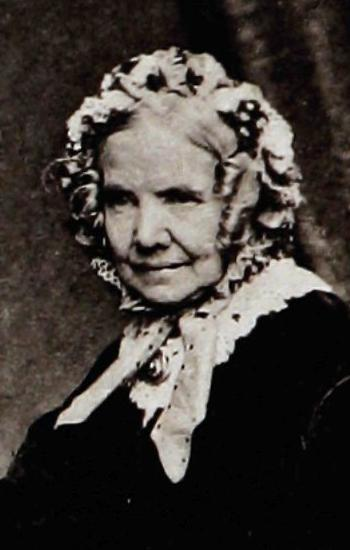
- Born: 18 March 1789; Brighton, Sussex, England
- Died: 22 September 1871 (aged 82); Brighton, Sussex, England
- Resting place: St Andrew's Church, Hove
- Occupations: Poet; hymn writer; editor
- Relatives: Henry Venn Elliott (brother); Edward Bishop Elliott (brother); E. S. Elliott (niece); Henry Venn
- Writing career
- Language: English
- Notable works: "Just as I Am"; "Thy will be done"

Charlotte Elliott (18 March 1789 – 22 September 1871) was an English evangelical Anglican poet, hymn writer, and editor. She is best known by two hymns, "Just as I Am" and "Thy will be done".

Elliott edited Christian Remembrancer Pocket Book (1834–1859) and The Invalid's Hymn book, 6th edition, 1854. To this latter collection, she contributed 112 hymns including "Just as I Am, without one plea", a hymn dated 1836, which was translated into almost every living language of the day. Unsure of her relationship with Christ, she penned words of assurance about Jesus loving her "just as I am." William B. Bradbury composed music for her lyrics and published the song in 1849. The hymn was translated into many languages, with tens of thousands of people committing their lives to Christ during the playing of it. She also published "My God and Father while I stray" (1834) in the same collection. Elliott was the author of Hymns for a week, 1837, 40th thousand, 1871; Hours of Sorrow, 1836 and many later editions, Poems by C. E., 1863. An invalid for many years, her life was filled with deeds of beneficence. She shrank from everything ostentatious, nearly all her books having been issued anonymously.

== Early life and education ==
Elliott was born on 18 March 1789 at Westfield Lodge, Brighton. Her maternal grandfather, Henry Venn of the Clapham Sect, of Huddersfield and Yelling, England, was a clergyman. He wrote The Complete Duty of Man (1763), and was one of that band of ministers, whose labours and writings brought about and promoted the Great Awakening of the 18th century, among the churches of Great Britain. He married (1757) a daughter of Thomas Bishop, a cleric in Ipswich. Their eldest daughter, Eling, often addressed in Venn's Memoirs, married on 30 December 1785 Charles Elliott, a silk merchant, of Clapham and Brighton. Of their six children, Charlotte was the third daughter. Her siblings were Henry Venn Elliott and Edward Bishop Elliott, who were members of the clergy and engaged as assistants to the vicar, rector and parish priest of St Mary the Virgin Church and St Mark's Church, Brighton respectively. Henry Venn Elliott was also the founder of St Mary's Hall in Brighton. There was also a sister, Eleanor.

Elliott's childhood was passed in a circle of great refinement and piety. She was highly educated, and developed, at an early age, a great passion for music and art.

== Career ==
Elliott spent the first 32 years of her life in Clapham. As a young woman, she was gifted as a portrait artist and a writer of humorous verse.

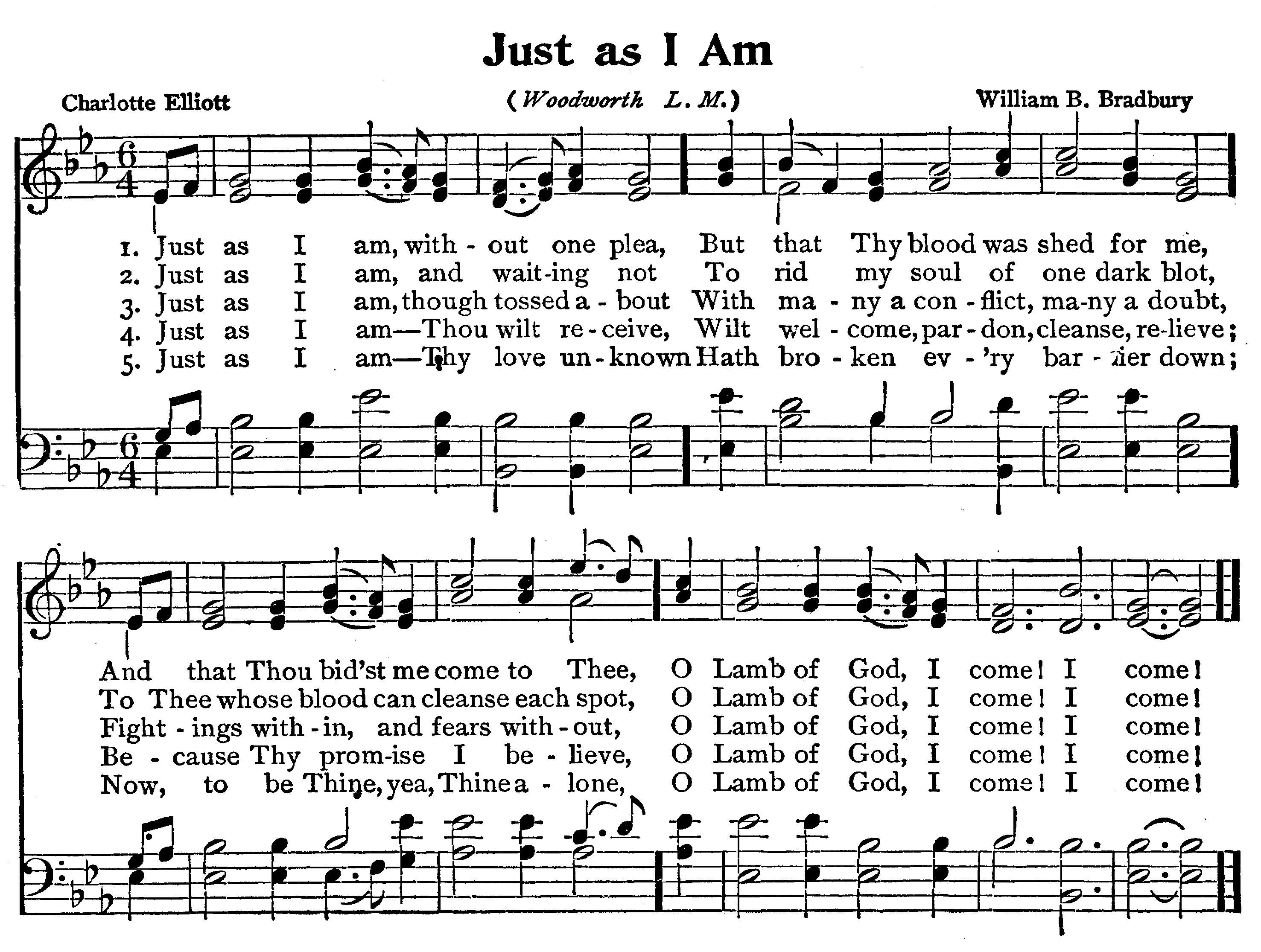
The hymn, "Just as I Am", with music by William Batchelder Bradbury

She became a favourite in social circles where religion was not mentioned, but a severe sickness in 1821 removed her from these companions and led her to feel a need for a personal Saviour. About this time, the Rev. Dr Cesar Malan of Geneva, who was on a visit to her father's Clapham residence, Grove House, asked her whether she was at peace with God, a question she resented at the time and refused to talk about that day, but a few days later she called on Dr. Malan and apologised, saying she wanted to cleanse her life before becoming a Christian. Malan answered, "Come just as you are," and she committed her life to Christ on that day. A letter from Malan, dated 18 May 1822, closed, "Dear Charlotte, cut the cable, it will take too long to unloose it; cut it, it is a small loss; the wind blows and the ocean is before you – the Spirit of God and eternity." This friendship became lifelong. Its beginning on 9 May 1822 was always regarded, according to her sister, as "the birthday of her soul to true spiritual life and peace".

Elliott's health was improved by a visit the following year to Normandy. But in 1829 she once more became an almost helpless sufferer, with only occasional intervals of relief. In 1833, her father died. She undertook in 1834 the editorial supervision of The Christian Remembrancer Pocket Book, an Annual, and in 1836 of the Invalid's Hymn Book – works previously conducted by a friend, Harriet Kiernan, who was then in the last stages of consumption. The annual she edited for 25 years and many of her poems appeared in it. To the edition of the Invalid's Hymn Book that she enlarged and edited anonymously in 1836 she contributed 115 hymns, among them the noted "Just as I am, without one plea". She contributed several hymns also in 1835 to a selection of Psalms and Hymns by her brother, Henry V. Elliott. She also published, in 1836, Hours of Sorrow Cheered and Comforted. Her Morning and Evening Hymns for a Week, was printed privately in 1837, and published in 1842.

Visits to Scotland in 1835 and to Switzerland in 1837 benefited her considerably. Her sister-in-law, Henry's wife, died in 1841. Her mother, after a year's severe illness, died in April 1843. Two of her sisters soon followed. So her home was broken up, and in 1845 she and a surviving sister followed a summer's sojourn on the European continent by fixing their home in Torquay. After 14 years, however, she returned to Brighton.

== Later years and death ==
Elliott was a member of the Church of England. In later years, when she was not able to attend public worship, she wrote, "My Bible is my church. It is always open, and there is my High Priest ever waiting to receive me. There I have my confessional, my thanksgiving, my psalm of praise, and a congregation of whom the world is not worthy – prophets, and apostles, and martyrs, and confessors; in short, all I can want I find there."

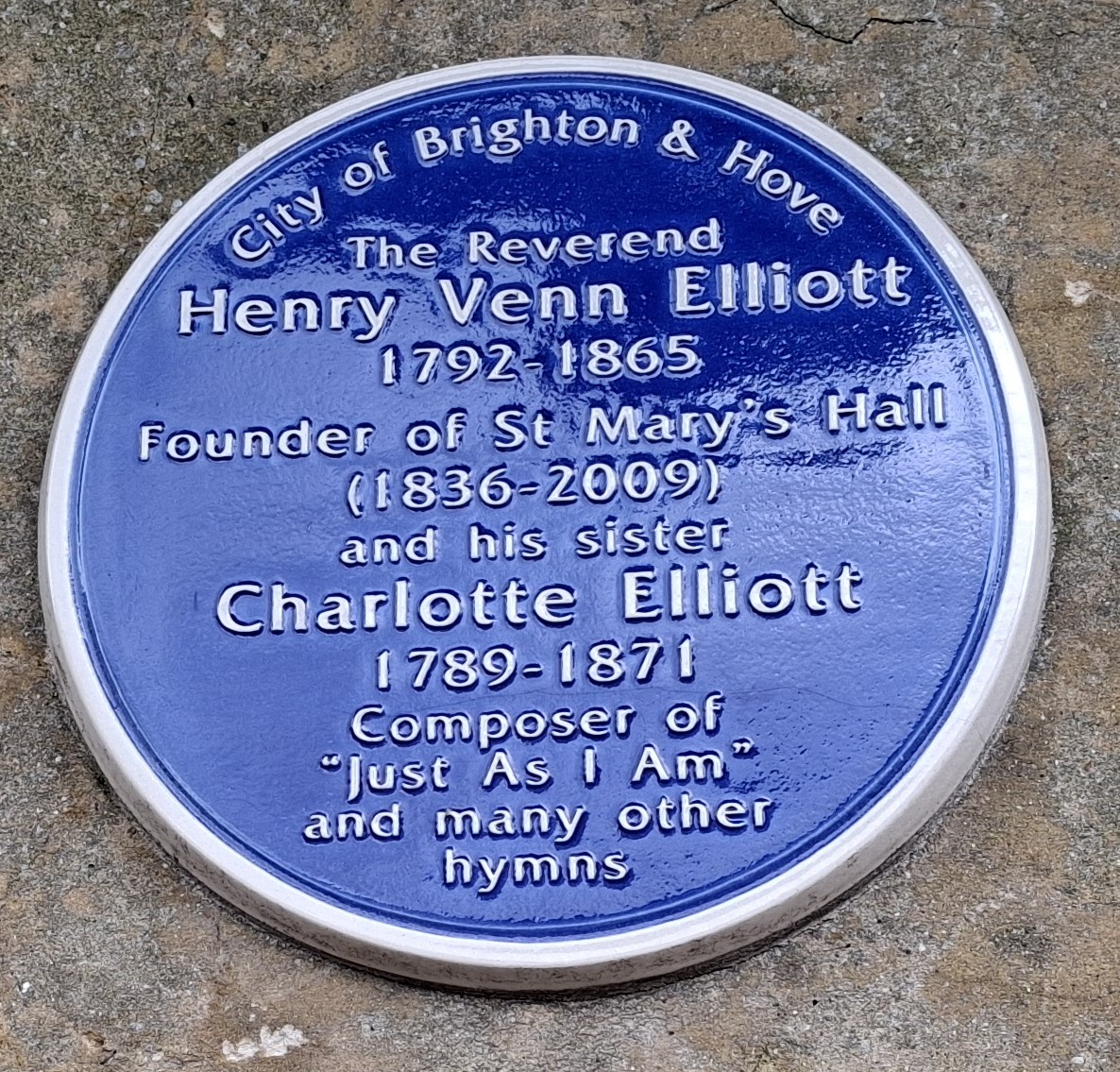
Blue Plaque on the wall outside St Mary's Hall on Eastern Road, Brighton

A volume of Poems appeared in 1863, and her brother Henry died in that year. Once only, in 1867, did she venture again from home, spending a few weeks in a neighboring village. In 1869, she fell seriously ill but managed to recover. She died at 10 Norfolk Terrace, Brighton, on 22 September 1871, and was buried alongside her brothers in the churchyard of St Andrew's, Hove.

Elliott was a distant relative of Virginia Woolf.

== Reception ==
Elliott wrote about 150 hymns and many poems, some of which were printed anonymously, with Just as I Am probably the best known. Evangelist Billy Graham wrote that his team used this hymn in almost every one of their crusades, since it presented "the strongest possible Biblical basis for the call of Christ." The historian of hymnody Kenneth Osbeck wrote that Just as I Am had "touched more hearts and influenced more people for Christ than any other song ever written." Lorella Rouster called it "an amazing legacy for an invalid woman who suffered from depression and felt useless to God's service."

== See also ==
English women hymnwriters (18th to 19th century)

- Eliza Sibbald Alderson
- Sarah Bache
- Charlotte Alington Barnard
- Sarah Doudney
- Ada R. Habershon
- Katherine Hankey
- Frances Ridley Havergal
- Maria Grace Saffery
- Anne Steele
- Emily Taylor
- Emily H. Woodmansee
