= Sarah Bache =

English hymn writer (1771?–1844)

Sarah Bache /beɪtʃ/ (1771? – 23 July 1844), was an English hymn writer. She was born at Bromsgrove, but brought up at Worcester by relatives named Laugher, members of the Rev. Thomas Belsham's congregation. Rev. Timothy Laugher, of Hackney (d. 1769), was her uncle, and she was a cousin of Joshua Tilt Bache.

She moved to Birmingham (before 1791, for she had attended the ministry of Joseph Priestley) and for many years kept the Islington School, in conjunction with a half-sister, Miss Penn. Another half-sister, Anna Penn, married the Rev. Lant Carpenter, LL.D. She was the author of the hymn See how he loved, which first appeared in the Exeter collection in 1812, compiled by Dr. Carpenter. She died at Birmingham on 23 July 1844, at the age of 74.

== See also ==
English women hymnwriters (18th to 19th-century)

- Eliza Sibbald Alderson
- Charlotte Alington Barnard
- Sarah Doudney
- Charlotte Elliott
- Ada R. Habershon
- Katherine Hankey
- Frances Ridley Havergal
- Maria Grace Saffery
- Anne Steele
- Emily Taylor
- Emily H. Woodmansee
