= Maria Grace Saffery =

English Baptist poet and hymn-writer

Maria Grace Saffery (1773–1858) was a Baptist poet and hymn-writer from England.

== Early life ==
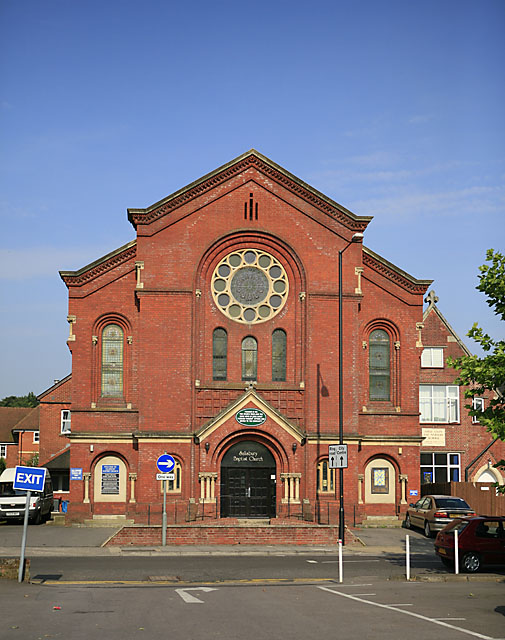
There is still a church in Brown Street in Salisbury although this building is more recent

Maria Grace Andrews was born in 1773 in the Westbury district of Wiltshire, England. Saffery was possibly the daughter of William Andrews of Stroud Green, Newbury, Berkshire although other sources differ. She was baptized on 30 November 1774. At the age of fifteen, she started writing her first big piece and showed great abilities in doing so. Her first poem was about Chait Singh, the Raja of Benares who was in dispute with Warren Hastings in India. Saffery was originally brought under the personal influence of Thomas Scott, the bible commentator.

== Personal and family life ==
Maria had a sister named Anne, who was also a writer. Maria married John Saffery, pastor of the Baptist church at Brown Street in Salisbury, becoming his second wife, in 1799. They had six children; the eldest, Philip John Saffery, succeeded to the office of pastor of the church at his father's death in 1825. Saffery also created a girls' school in Salisbury. In 1835 she retired to Bratton, also in Wiltshire, where the rest of her life was spent with her daughter. She died on 5 March 1858 and was buried in the graveyard of the baptist chapel there.

== Major works ==
=== Poems ===
- Cheyt Sing. A Poem. By a Young Lady of Fifteen (1790)

=== Hymns ===
- Tis the Great Father we adore (1828)
- Poems on Sacred Subjects (1834)
- God of the sunlight hours, how sad (1834)
- There is a little lonely fold (1834)
- Fain, O my child, I'd have thee know (1844)

=== Novels ===
- The Noble Enthusiast (1792)

== See also ==
English women hymnwriters (18th to 19th-century)

- Eliza Sibbald Alderson
- Sarah Bache
- Charlotte Alington Barnard
- Sarah Doudney
- Charlotte Elliott
- Ada R. Habershon
- Katherine Hankey
- Frances Ridley Havergal
- Anne Steele
- Emily Taylor
- Emily H. Woodmansee
