= Louisa Fennell =

English watercolour painter (1847–1930)

Louisa Fennell (1847–1930) was an English watercolour painter. She was best known as a painter of landscapes and townscapes of the towns and cities of the West Riding of Yorkshire, particularly the County town of Wakefield, its surrounding area, and the city of York.

== Biography ==
Louisa Fennell was born in the Wakefield area of the West Riding of Yorkshire in 1847. She died in 1930.

Fennel was a watercolourist who exhibited widely in the North of England, e.g. her watercolour entry to the 1884 Spring exhibition in Derby was singled out by the local newspaper as "particularly noticeable".

In 1881 she departed from her usual subject-matter and published an album of 12 lithographs on The Life of Saint Paul in Rome, which a reviewer in the Magazine of Art described as "not very well done" in a round-up of what leading women artists had been working on.

A set of print reproductions of her watercolours was issued in 1900, described as "well known" and reproduced in the 1950s. The Hepworth Wakefield has a collection of her works, described as "a much loved part of The Wakefield Permanent Art Collection", and sells modern reproductions of them as prints and notecards. Between 1876 and 1882 she exhibited 11 works, mostly views of Rome, at the Royal Society of British Artists in London. Between 1869 and 1894, Fennell showed nine works at the Society of Women Artists. She also had work included in the Yorkshire Jubilee Exhibition (1887) and the Glasgow International Exhibition of 1888.

Fennell is known for her watercolour paintings of local Wakefield scenes including Wakefield Cathedral and Wakefield Chantry Chapel at the turn of the 20th century (1898–1904). Also Sandal Castle painted in 1876, prints of which were donated by the owner to Wakefield City Art Gallery and more recently to the Hepworth Gallery. Later Fennell painted views of other cities, in particular Micklegate and Monk Gate in the city of York.

A retrospective exhibition of her work was held at Wakefield City Art Gallery in September 1936. In March 1950 an exhibition of her paintings was opened by the provost of Wakefield at the gallery.

After her death, nine of her Wakefield scenes were donated by her family to Wakefield City Art Gallery, in addition to a copy of The Life of Saint Paul in Rome and her original illustrations. Seventeen of her works are now the property of Wakefield City Metropolitan District Council.

== Views of Wakefield ==
The set of seventeen scenes of Wakefield consist of the following sixteen watercolour paintings and one black and white drawing:

1. Northgate, Wakefield, 1898 — Looking up Northgate, the cathedral can be seen in the background.
2. Almshouse Lane, Wakefield, 1898 — Almshouse Lane shown with a gate, before it was paved. This area was later demolished and became the site of the Ridings Shopping Centre in 1983.
3. Old houses on Westgate, Wakefield, 1899 — Three timber-framed houses, possibly Medieval and long since demolished.
4. Bread Street, Wakefield, 1900 — Bread Street looking towards the cathedral.
5. Marygate, Wakefield, 1900 — Marygate, at the junction of Wood Street and Westgate. This area has changed considerably.
6. Wakefield Cathedral from the east, 1900 — The cathedral (4) from the east. (Kirkgate to the left, and Teall Street to the right).
7. The Six Chimneys, Wakefield, 1900 — This timber-framed building on Kirkgate, said to date back to the time of John of Gaunt, collapsed in 1941 due to careless structural alteration.
8. Cross Square, Wakefield, 1900 — Cross Square in 1900. (Marygate is to the left and Silver Street to the right). The old house was demolished that year.
9. Warrengate and the Springs, Wakefield, 1900 — Warrengate and the Springs looking up the hill towards the cathedral, which can be seen in the distance. (Warrengate was once one of the entrances to parkland belonging to the Earls of Warren)
10. The Market Cross, Wakefield, painted c. 1900 — The Market Cross in Cross Square with the cathedral in the background. The cross built in 1707 by public subscription, was used for public meetings and for the sale of eggs, butter and poultry, and demolished, despite public protest, in 1866.
11. The Shepherd's Rest, Wakefield, c. 1900 — This public house was off George Street, near what was once the Cattle Market. Now demolished, the old public house pictured here was still much the same up to the 1950s.
12. The Old Bakehouse, Westgate, Wakefield, c. 1900 — A watercolour painting of the old bakehouse, showing the gable end of the building at the front of the picture, with two doors and four chimneys.
13. The Old Bakehouse, Westgate, Wakefield, around 1900 — A black and white drawing very similar to the last painting.
14. The Chantry Chapel on Wakefield Bridge, 1901 — The bridge Chapel (5) is one of only three surviving in the UK, and was built in 1357, a hundred years before the Battle of Wakefield. The bridge had been erected in 1342.
15. The Shambles, Wakefield, 1902 — The Shambles from the Bull Ring. This was situated between Cross Square and the Bullring.
16. Westgate Bridge, Wakefield, 1903 — Now part of Westgate End, Westgate Bridge was once a real bridge across Alverthorpe Beck and Balne Beck, which run under Westgate, before joining the River Calder at Thornes.
17. The newspaper shop in Butcher Row, Wakefield, 1904 — Butcher Row, off Cross Square, Wakefield, since demolished. The painting shows a view looking up Butcher Row towards the corner of Westgate, Silver Street and Wood Street.

Other paintings of Wakefield include:

1. Man And Child On A Lane With A View Of Wakefield Beyond
2. Distant View of Wakefield in Yorkshire
3. SANDAL CASTLE PAINTED IN 1876

== Other scenes ==
In addition to watercolour paintings of Wakefield, Louisa also painted many other landscapes and townscapes, including these:

- Burnsall Church
- Rievaulx Abbey
- The Steps at Haddon Hall, Derbyshire
- A Village Green with Figures Hanging Out Washing Beside a Church
- On the Rhoen (Bedford, Bedfordshire (GB))
- Micklegate, York
- Monkgate, York
- York Street Scene with Figures
- Street Scenes
- City Walls, York
- Byland Abbet (Watercolour)
- Ripon Cathedral (Watercolour)
