= Samuel Osborne Habershon =

English physician

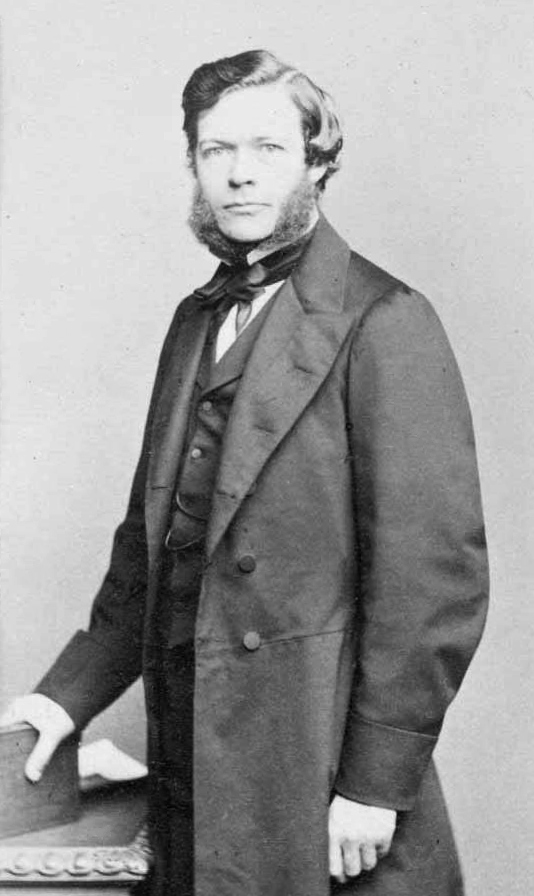
Samuel Osborne Habershon

Samuel Osborne Habershon (1825 – 22 August 1889) was an English physician.

Habershon was born at Rotherham in 1825, and studied medicine (from 1842) at Guy's Hospital, London. He gained numerous scholarships at the university of London, where he graduated M.B. in 1848 and M.D. in 1851. After being appointed in succession demonstrator of anatomy and of morbid anatomy and lecturer in pathology, he became assistant physician in 1854, and in 1866 full physician to Guy's. He lectured there on materia medica from 1856 to 1873, and on medicine from 1873 to 1877. Having been a member of the Royal College of Physicians of London from 1851, and fellow from 1856, he was successively examiner, councillor, and censor, and in 1876 Lumleian lecturer, in 1883 Harveian orator, and in 1887 vice-president of the college. He was president of the Medical Society of London in 1873.

In November 1880, being then senior physician to Guy's, he resigned his post, together with John Cooper Forster, the senior surgeon. Habershon died on 22 August 1889 from gastric ulcer, leaving one son and three daughters, including hymnwriter Ada R. Habershon; his wife had died in April of the same year. As a physician Habershon had a high reputation, especially in abdominal diseases, which he did much to elucidate. He was the first in England to propose the operation of gastrostomy for stricture of the œsophagus, which Cooper Forster performed on a patient of Habershon's in 1858. He was one of the founders of the Christian Medical Association.

Habershon wrote, besides twenty-eight papers in 'Guy's Hospital Reports,' from 1855 to 1872, and others in various medical transactions and journals:

- 'Pathological and Practical Observations on Diseases of the Abdomen,' 1857; fourth ed. 1888; American editions 1859, 1879.
- 'On the Injurious Effects of Mercury in … Disease,' 1859.
- 'On Diseases of the Stomach,' 1866; third ed. 1879; American ed. 1879.
- 'On Some Diseases of the Liver' (Lettsomian Lectures), 1872.
- 'On the Pathology of the Pneumogastric Nerve' (Lumleian Lectures), 1877, 2nd edit. 1885; Italian translation, 1879.
