= Ada R. Habershon =

English Christian hymnist and writer

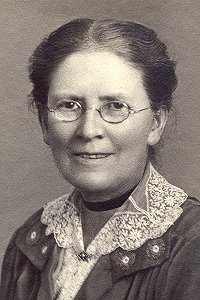
- Ada R. Habershon

Background information
- Born: 8 January 1861; Marylebone, Middlesex, England
- Died: 1 February 1918 (aged 57) Marylebone, London, England
- Genre: Christian hymns
- Occupation: Songwriter
- Years active: 1899-1918

Ada Ruth Habershon (8 January 1861 – 1 February 1918) was an English Christian hymnist and writer, best known for her 1907 gospel song "Will the Circle Be Unbroken?" for which the tune was composed by Charles H. Gabriel.

== Biography ==
=== Early life and ministry ===
Ada Ruth Habershon was born in Marylebone, England, on 8 January 1861. She was the youngest of four children. Her father, Samuel Osborne Habershon, was a noted physician; her mother was Grace Habershon. She was raised in Chelsea, London, in a Christian home. Her parents were part of the Plymouth Brethren movement, although they also worshipped regularly at the Metropolitan Tabernacle. The pastor of the Tabernacle, Charles Spurgeon, became a close family friend. Spurgeon wrote to Habershon several times when her parents both died in 1889.

Habershon was educated at a boarding school in Dover, and later studied at the Female School of Art in South Kensington for three and a half years. After leaving the School, she became involved in a number of Christian ministries. Between 1883 and 1899, she joined her parents working at the ragged school at Gray's Yard, James Street, which provided education to children from poor backgrounds. In 1884, she met Dwight L. Moody and Ira D. Sankey during their evangelistic mission in London, where she sang two songs with Sankey: "Let the Master In" and "He is Abundantly Able to Save." After her parents' deaths in 1889, Habershon explored further avenues for service. She took part in two voyages with the Royal National Mission to Deep Sea Fishermen in 1891 and 1892. She also worked with the London YWCA as finance secretary, raising donations towards the construction of the association's headquarters.

=== Teaching and publishing ===
In the 1890s, Habershon began writing and teaching on the Bible. At the request of D. L. Moody, who she met again at the 1892 Keswick Convention, she visited the United States to deliver lectures on the Old Testament. Her time in the United States lasted a number of months through the second half of 1895. Initially, she stayed with Moody in Northfield and taught female students at Northfield Seminary. She later travelled to Chicago, teaching at the Moody Bible Institute and the Moody Church. Some of this material was published in 1898 as Types in the Old Testament.

For a while after her American tour, Habershon had an itinerant teaching ministry. This included delivering talks about the Tabernacle, using a specially commissioned model. When illness prevented her from continuing in her speaking ministry, she focussed on writing and publishing. She wrote a number of further books related to the Bible. Several of these were about typology, outlining how Old Testament people and events prefigured the work of Christ. Her studies of the New Testament also focussed on the Parables, the miracles of Jesus and the Book of Revelation. Her books included prefaces by noted evangelical leaders, such as Sir Robert Anderson and James Martin Gray, and were reviewed in periodicals such as The Churchman and The Expository Times. At the time, it was common for Christian women to publish semi-anonymously under initials, but Habershon always wrote under her name.

Commenting on her work, Brian Irwin notes that "Habershon's work is everywhere systematizing and analytical"; she took a topical approach in her books, rather than working through the Bible sequentially. As an example, the chapters in her 1923 book, The Study of the Parables cover topics such as "The Trinity in the Parables" and "Pictures of Men in the Parables", rather than looking at each individual Parable in turn. In her discussions of connections between Old and New Testament, Habershon was often thorough; in her Study of the Types, she mentions over 120 parallels between Joseph and Christ.

=== Hymn writing ===
Habershon began writing poetry and hymns in 1901. In 1905, Charles M. Alexander and R. A. Torrey toured the United Kingdom, and Alexander asked Habershon to write hymns for use during this evangelistic tour. She provided further hymns for Alexander's 1906 campaign with John Wilbur Chapman. Habershon ultimately sent Alexander almost a thousand hymns. A number were included in a collection of hymns from the Alexander's missions, published around 1910.

In 1907, a collection of her hymns was published, in collaboration with Robert Harkness, under the title Twelve Sacred Songs. Her most reprinted hymns include "When I Feel My Faith Will Fail", "There are Loved Ones in the Glory", "Soon Will Our Saviour from Heaven Appear" and "A Saviour Who Died Our Salvation to Win". She is best-known today for her 1907 song "Will the Circle Be Unbroken?", which was accompanied by a tune written by Charles H. Gabriel. This was popularised by singer-songwriter A. P. Carter. Her hymn "When I Feel My Faith Will Fail" received renewed popularity in 2013, when it was set to new music with an additional verse by Matt Merker.

=== Later life and death ===
In 1912, Habershon founded the Women's Branch of the Society for the Investigation of Prophecy. The society held twice-yearly conferences, where Habershon presented papers alongside others. She was its honorary secretary until her death.

Habershon died in Marylebone on 1 February 1918, at the age of 57. Her autobiography, A Gatherer of Fresh Spoils, was compiled by her sister and published in 1918.

== Works ==
- Types in the Old Testament, 1898
- Vorbilder: Christus im alten Testament, 1899
- The Study of the Types (London: Morgan & Scott, 1898)
- The Study of the Parables (London: Nisbet, 1904)
- The Bible and the British Museum (London: Morgan & Scott, 1904)
- The Priests and Levites, a Type of the Church; a Bible Study, 1908
- A Sevenfold Method of Studying the Epistles to the Seven Churches, 1914
- Hidden Pictures: Or, How the New Testament is Concealed in the Old Testament (Edinburgh: Oliphants Ld, 1916)
- The Day of Atonement in Its Prophetic Aspect, 1916
- A Gatherer of Fresh Spoil; an Autobiography and Memoir, 1918
- I Am a Prayer and Other Poems, 1918
- Israel’s Exodus: Past and Future, 1918
- Outline Study of the Tabernacle
- The Victorian Handbook of Types
- Study of the Miracles
- The Titles of the Lord of Glory, 1910 (with a preface by Sir Robert Anderson)
- Exploring in New Testament Fields
