= Middle Littleton Tythe Barn =

Middle Littleton Tithe Barn
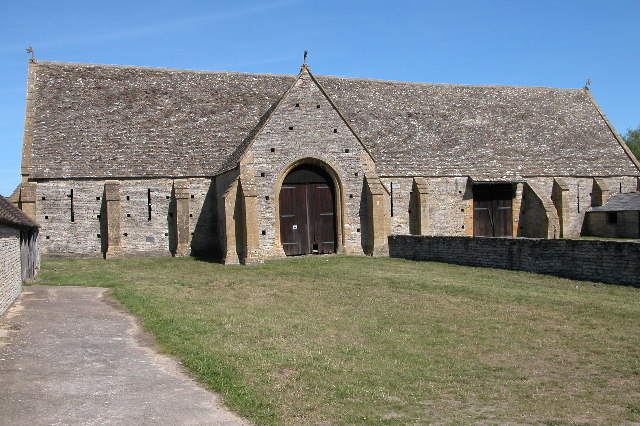
- Interactive map of the Middle Littleton Tithe Barn area

General information
- Type: Tithe Barn
- Location: Middle Littleton, Evesham, Worcestershire, England
- Coordinates: 52.12185°N 1.88473°W
- Construction started: 12th or 13th century
- Owner: National Trust

Height
- Height: 40 feet (12 m)

Dimensions
- Other dimensions: 130 feet (40 m) long, 42 feet (13 m) wide

Design and construction
- Designations: Grade I listed

Website
- www.nationaltrust.org.uk/middle-littleton-tithe-barn/

Middle Littleton Tythe Barn, also known as Middle Littleton Tithe Barn, is a grade I listed 13th or 14th-century tithe barn in the village of Middle Littleton, near Evesham in Worcestershire. It is one of the largest and most notable tithe barns in England. The barn is constructed of a mixture of Blue Lias and Cotswold stones, with a stone tile roof. It was originally built for Evesham Abbey, which was the third largest abbey in England. It is now owned and operated by the National Trust.

== History ==
There is some uncertainty about when the barn was built. The National Trust describes it as 13th-century, whereas English Heritage describe it as 14th-century; the discrepancy may be the result of a radiocarbon date of around 1250 conflicting with evidence that the barn was built in 1376 by Abbot John Ombersley of Evesham Abbey.

The barn was built to hold tithes collected for Evesham Abbey, which was the third largest abbey in England before the Dissolution of the Monasteries. The size of the barn is an indication of the importance of the abbey at this time. Also remaining from the Benedictine Evesham Abbey are two churches, a bell tower, a cloister arch and the Almonry.

== Architecture ==
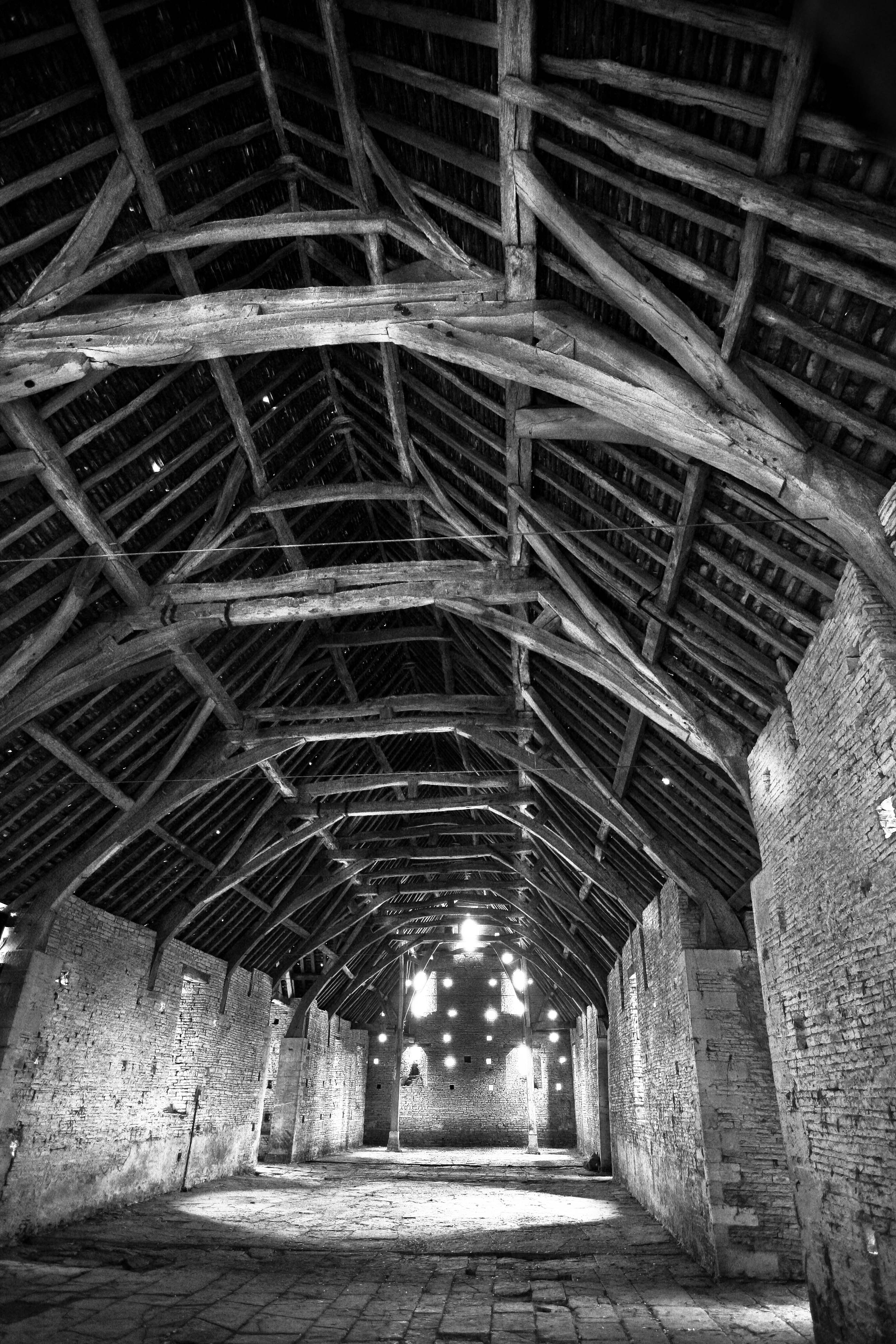
Middle Littleton Tithe Barn, Evesham, Worcestershire

The barn is constructed of Blue lias stone with Cotswold stone dressings. It has a triple purlin roof which is tiled in stone. The building has had several modifications; a pair of gables on each side of the building were destroyed during the Victorian period and additions made to both sides. Smaller gables with ornate clover-leaf finials and many buttresses remain.

== Protection ==
The barn was granted Grade I listed status on 30 July 1959.

== Operations ==
The barn is owned by the National Trust and is open to the public.
