= Evesham Bell Tower =

Detached bell tower in Evesham, Worcestershire

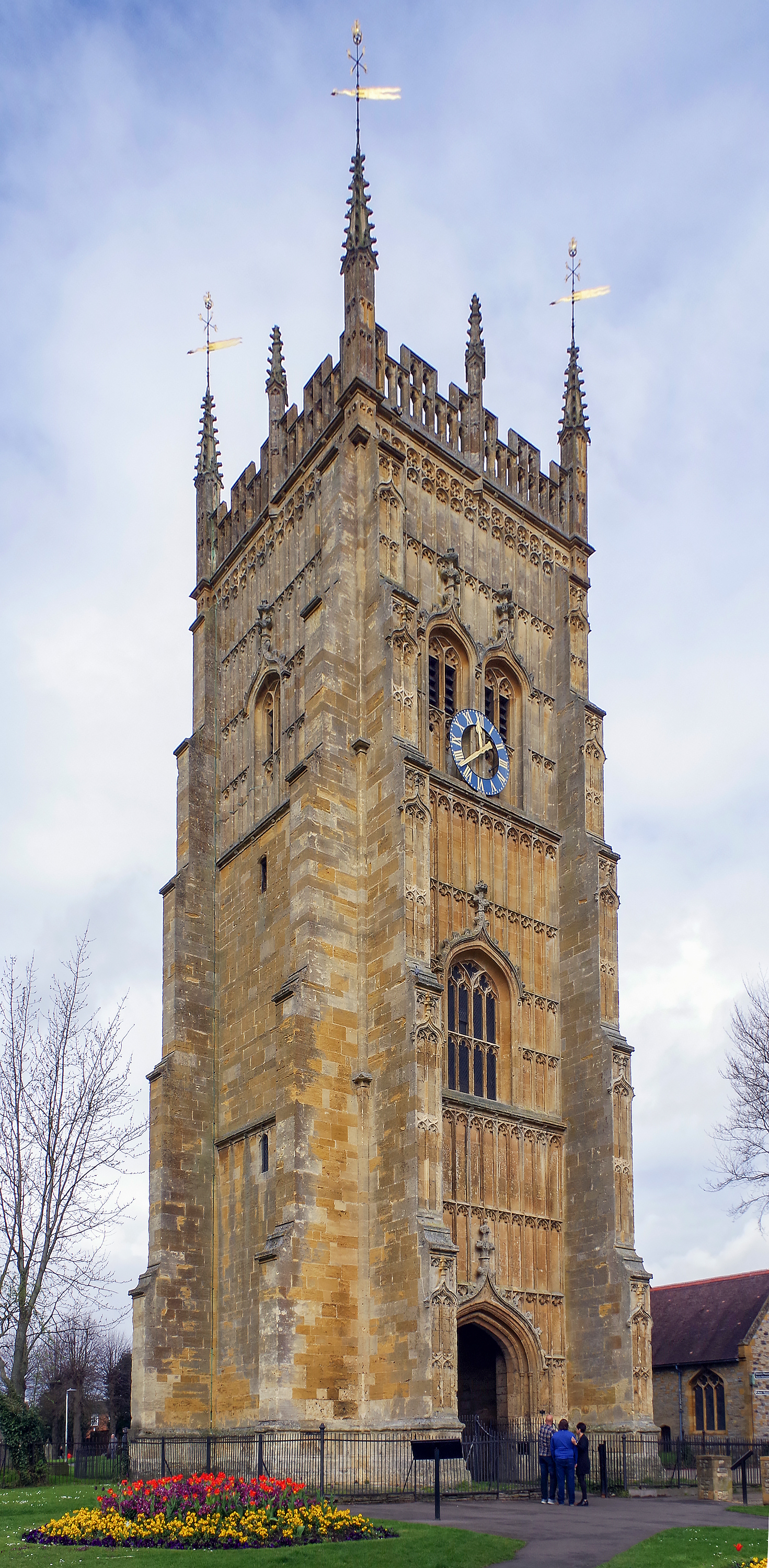
- The Bell Tower from the southeast in April 2022

- Location in Worcestershire
- Location: Evesham, Worcestershire, England

History
- Founded: c. 1207
- Founders: Adam Sortes (first tower); William of Stow (second tower); Roger Zatton (third tower); Clement Lichfield (present tower)

Architecture
- Heritage designation: Grade I
- Designated: 7 May 1952
- Style: Perpendicular Gothic
- Years built: 1524−1532

Evesham Bell Tower is the freestanding belfry for the town of Evesham, Worcestershire. Originally founded in 1207 by Adam Sortes, the present tower, the fourth to stand on the same site, was founded and built by Clement Lichfield, Abbot of Evesham, as the bell tower for Evesham Abbey in the 16th century. It is the only part of the abbey complex to survive wholly intact.

Considered one of England's finest medieval belfries, the tower sits in the centre of Abbey Park, alongside the parish churches of All Saints and St Lawrence. Since the Dissolution of the Monasteries, during which Evesham Abbey was almost entirely demolished, the tower has served as the belfry for the town's churches. The tower is the town's most significant landmark and is designated a Grade I listed building on the National Heritage List for England, the highest rating.

The tower has been widely celebrated for its architecture, being possibly the largest and most complete example of a late medieval belfry in the country. The author and historian James Lees-Milne said the tower is "one of the nation's architectural treasures".

== History ==
=== Previous towers ===
==== First tower (1207−1291) ====
The construction of the first recorded freestanding bell tower (campanile) at Evesham Abbey took place at the start of the 13th century, when Thomas of Marlborough, Prior of Evesham, gave money towards the building of a bell tower that "Master Sortes had begun", in approximately 1207.

Whilst it is unknown when this tower was completed, the bell tower or 'campanile de Evesham' as it was then known, was struck by lightning in 1261, the resulting fire causing significant damage. Repairs to the tower are not recorded until 1278−1279.

In 1291, the majority of the tower collapsed in a storm, referenced in John Leland's Antiquarii de rebus britannicis collectanea. A passage in Leland's collection reads: tam de materia quam de plumbo, 'both of matter and of lead'. This implies a feature of Sortes' tower was a lead-lined spire which topped the tower and that the majority collapsed.

==== Second and third towers ====
From 1319−1320, William of Stow, at the time the Abbey's sacrist, is recorded as building a new detached bell tower, the cost of which he subsidised by twenty marks. No further records of Stow's tower exists.

Between 1379 and 1395, Roger Zatton, Abbot of Evesham, contributed to the construction of a bell tower built in stone. During his time as Abbot, Zatton undertook many projects to the improvement of the abbey and its estates. The causes of the replacement of Stow's tower or events following the construction of the third tower are unknown.

=== Present tower ===
==== Early history ====
In 1524, Clement Lichfield, Abbot of Evesham, began construction of a large stone freestanding bell tower, replacing Zatton's tower. Lichfield, like Zatton, undertook a great deal of work on the abbey and estate, including on the neighbouring churches of St Lawrence and All Saints and it is implied both from contemporary sources and an inscription on the eastern tower arch that the bell tower was intended to be his crowning achievement.

Construction lasted from 1524 to 1532 and the building fund was supplemented by donations and bequests, both from the population of Evesham and from further afield, one such example being a donation from John Molder, vicar at Little Wolford, Warwickshire.

Before the Dissolution of the Monasteries, which demolished Evesham Abbey, Lichfield's tower, and indeed all three which came before it, stood on the north side of the Abbey complex, close to the north transept of the abbey church. The tower's principle facades look east and west, over the monk's graveyard and parish graveyard respectively. The tower was built not only to act as a bell tower for the abbey and the two churches, but also as a gateway between the two cemeteries. The tower was built with a portal, as the distinction between the burial ground for the monks and that for the townspeople was important.

During the Dissolution of the Monasteries, the abbot of Evesham, now Philip Hawford since Lichfield's resignation in 1538, petitioned Henry VIII to save the abbey by converting it into a royal collage. The petitions failed, however, and the abbey was surrendered and then dissolved in January 1540. Demolition progressed quickly and by October of the same year, the majority of the abbey had been reduced to piles of stone.

==== Post dissolution ====
In August 1541, Philip Hoby, a member of the royal household, was granted a twenty-one year lease of the monastery site in a letter from Henry VIII. However, the letter makes reference to the fact that the bells and tower were excluded from this lease, keeping them for the profit of the crown. The tower was unable to be demolished until the bells within it were sold for profit. However, in John Scudamore's accounts (acting as receiver for Staffordshire, Shropshire, Herefordshire and Worcestershire), he makes note of the fact there is still one bell in the tower. In 1553 or 1554, Mary I granted the one remaining bell to the town, describing the tower as a "clock house", thus saving it from demolition.

At a meeting of the town council in May 1674, it was reported that the pinnacles on the west side of the tower were decaying and that to fund their repair, a levy could be ordered. Further repairs were necessary in 1754 when the canopy was repaired, repainted and renewed, and in 1820, to the internal woodwork.

==== Modern era ====
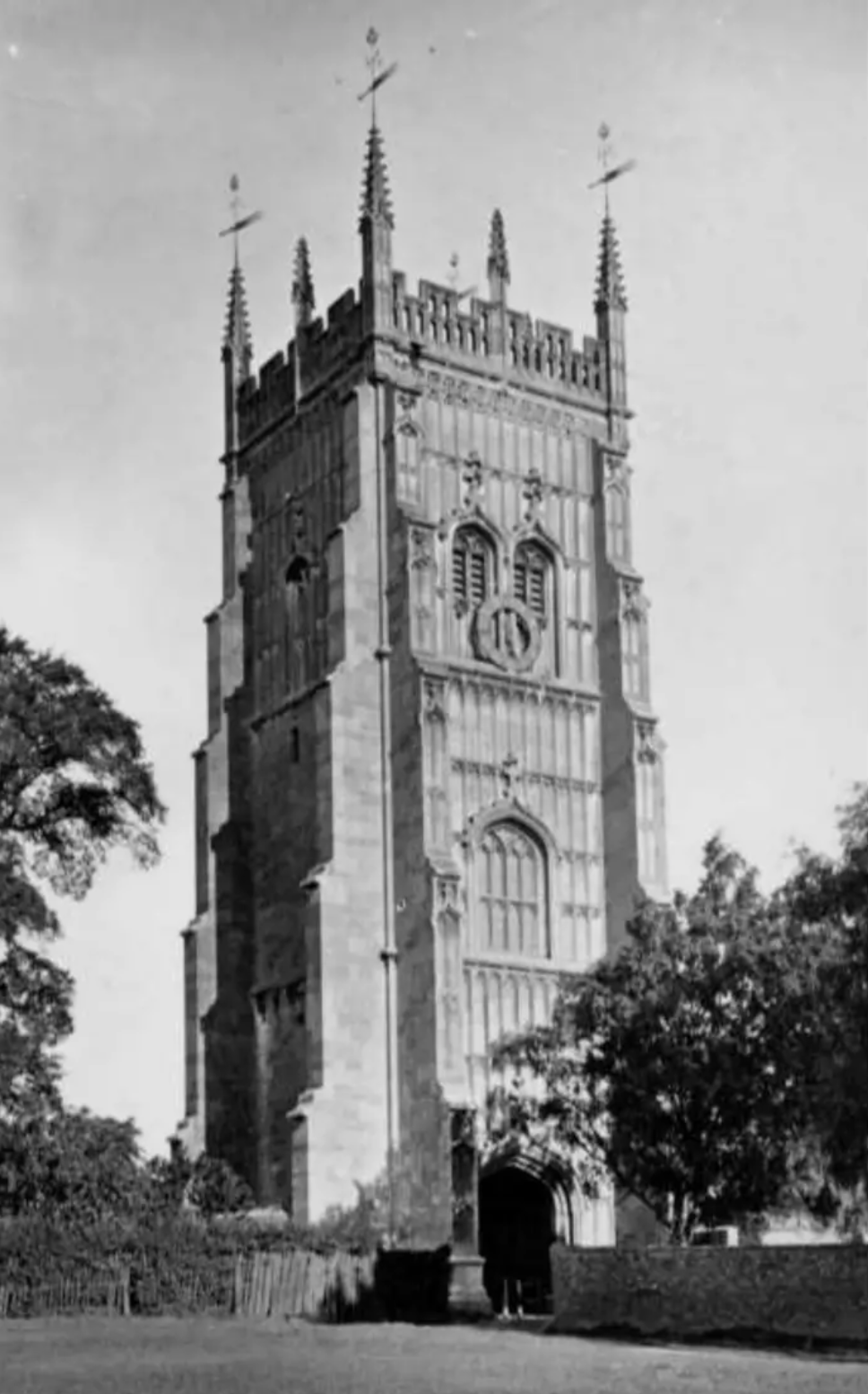
Evesham Bell Tower in 1875

The church accounts show that regular repair work to the tower and the bells were necessary, most notably in 1848 when the stonework was repointed and the roof renewed, requiring scaffolding to be erected. The pinnacles were strengthened with iron clamps and the weathervanes on those pinnacles reset. The tower roof was repaired again in 1875 together with new internal floors and the regilding of the clock faces.

No further work was carried out to the tower itself until 1937 when concern began to mount about the condition of the stonework. The firm of architects Ellery Anderson Roiser & Falconer was commissioned to produce a detailed report on the fabric, and their findings were that the pinnacles were in particularly poor condition, suffering both the full force of the prevailing wind and damage from within by the iron clamps. The iron clamps had rusted and forced apart the stonework, causing it to crack. Though work was recommended, the outbreak of the Second World War in 1939 stopped the work before it could begin.

It was not until 1947 that Roiser returned and provided a new report, in which they mention that the condition of the tower had deteriorated further. They did, however, suggest that the incomplete fan vaulted ceiling over the tower gateway could be completed as part of the work to restore the tower. The parish did not have the funds for such a large and expensive restoration, so a 'Bell Tower Restoration Committee' was formed to raise the funds, chaired by the Mayor of Evesham. The scope of the work, which lasted until 1952, included repairs to the stonework, repairing the clock and chiming mechanisms as well as recasting the bells. The total scheme, upon its completion in 1953, had cost £8,475, well over the cost estimated in 1947 of £6,000.

During August 2012, some large pieces of stonework fell from the tower, resulting in inspections on the condition of the structure. The inspections report in February 2013 showed that the tower needed an estimated £500,000 of repairs. Following a successful Heritage Lottery Fund application, which awarded £45,000 in November 2013, and further fundraising, the work was undertaken between April 2015 and February 2016. The stonework on each level of the tower was cleaned and restored, the weathervanes regilded and the clock faces repaired. To complete the project, a commemorative stone plaque was placed on the tower.

== Architecture ==
The tower is virtually unaltered from its original appearance in the 16th century, which makes it a rare survivor of the medieval period. Replacement of stonework has been confined to the pinnacles and parapet, but in facsimile, preserving its appearance. The only physical alterations have been the replacement of the clock dials and the removal of the jacks. The only other difference is the lack of the original white limewash, which has faded over time and is now no longer visible except for in isolated patches on the eastern side of the tower.

The tower is 28 feet (8.5 m) square and 110 feet (34 m) high to the top of the pinnacles. The design follows a square plan with off-set stepped corner buttresses. Designed and constructed in the late Perpendicular Gothic period, the tower bears similarities with other church towers in the Midlands of a similar age, most notably the central towers of Gloucester and Worcester cathedrals, the former in the pinnacles and the latter with the stone panelling. The tower is constructed from oolite limestone.

The tower is formed of three stages, each separated by a deep band of stonework that acts as a sill to the windows:

- At ground level, a large arch pierces the tower in its eastern and western faces. The arches are elaborately moulded with crocketted ogee decoration rising to a crocketted pinnacle over the centre. The eastern and west faces of the lower two stages have extensive stone panelling. The interior of the first stage contains corbels supporting an unfinished fan vault.
- The second stage contains two large four-light traceried windows in the Perpendicular Gothic style, one each in the western and eastern faces. Like the arch below it, it has an ogee dripstone and a crocketted pinnacle, and like the lowest stage, is extensively panelled. The north and south faces are plainer, each one containing one larger round headed window at the top, the south face also containing three smaller slit windows for lighting the staircase.
- The third or belfry stage contains a pair of windows on all except the south face, again with ogee dripstone and crocketted pinnacle. Each window is divided into two vertical segments by mullions, and two horizontal segments, by transoms. The lowest half of each opening is stone panelled, the upper half containing louvres; the clock faces are situated in this lower panelled section. The south face of this stage contains only one window, rather than the pair seen on the other faces of the tower; it also lacks a clock face.
- The tower is crowned with an openwork trefoil parapet featuring crocketted pinnacles on each corner and one smaller one in the centre of the parapet.
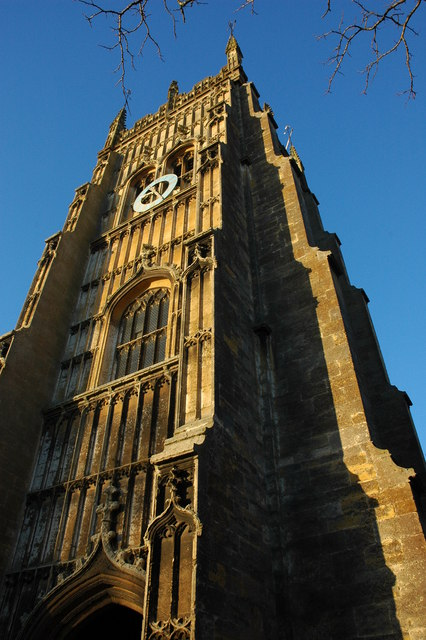
Detail on corner buttresses

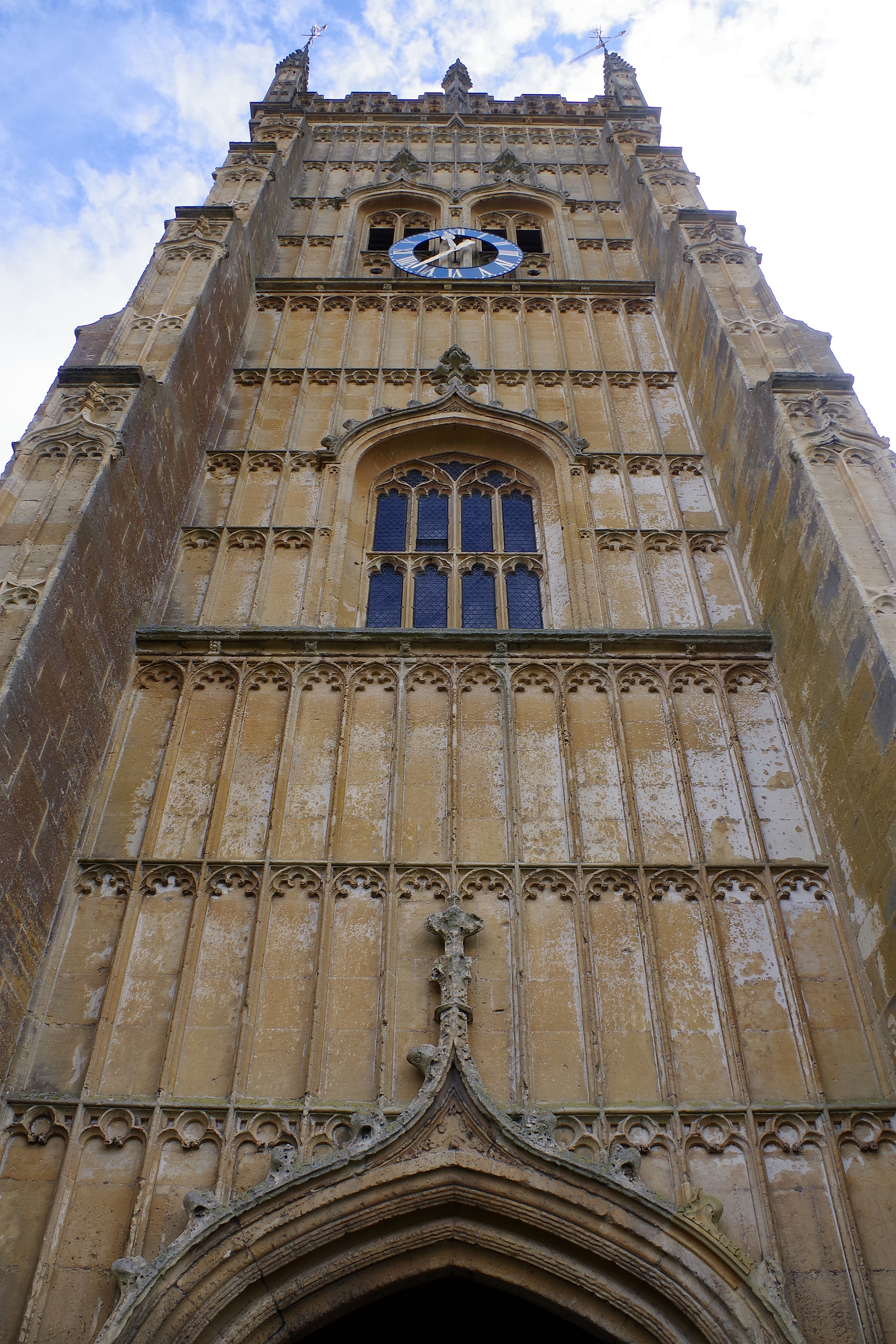
Eastern face detail, showing remaining patches of limewash

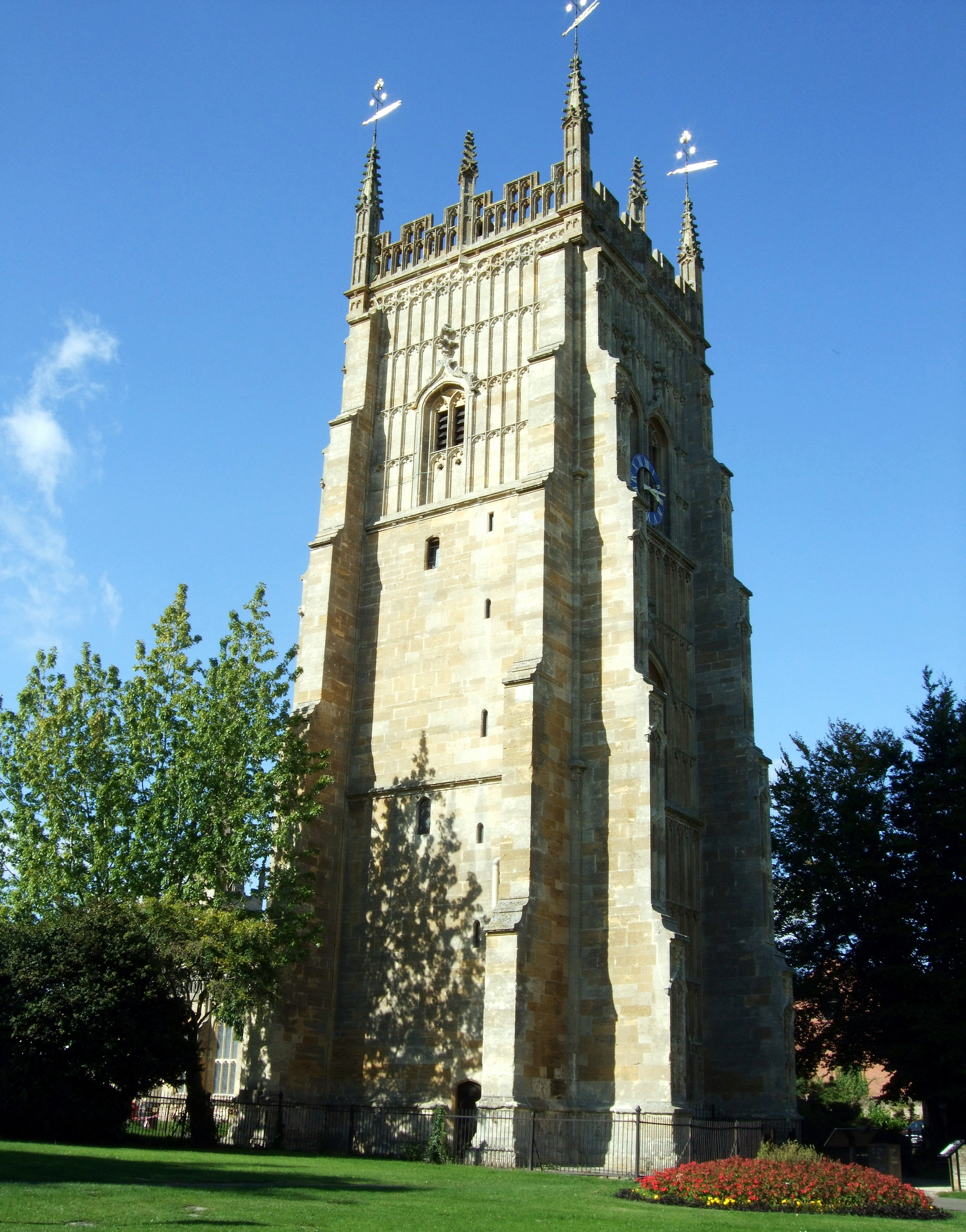
South face, showing slit windows for staircase

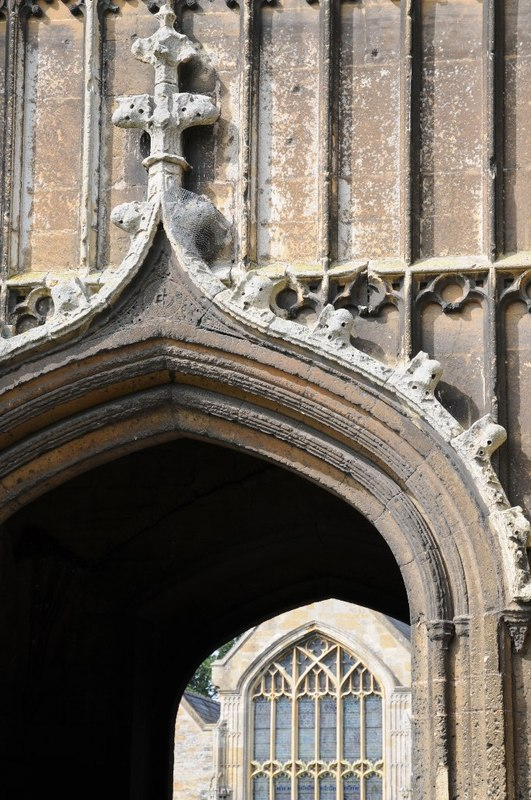
Detail on eastern portal

== Bells ==
=== Early bells ===
Though Lichfield's bell tower is the fourth to stand on the site, the first written record of any bells is in 1540, when shortly after the dissolution of the abbey, John of Alcester surveyed the contents of the abbey and found six bells within the bell tower. By October 1540, much of the abbey complex including the main structure of the church, had been demolished, leaving the bell tower as the principle monument. In order for the bell tower to be demolished, the bells within it had to be surveyed, removed and sold. A survey in 1546 found one bell remaining in the tower, listed as weighing approximately 30 long cwt (1,524 kilograms (3,360 lb).

In 1631, the 'great bell', likely the single bell mentioned in 1546, was recast by George Oldfield of Nottingham, to a slightly lighter weight of 29 long cwt 0 qrs 13 lb (1,480 kilograms (3,260 lb). In 1664, the bells in the churches of All Saints and St Lawrence were used to augment the bells in the bell tower. Two of the bells were sent directly into the tower, the remaining three were recast by Henry Bagley of Chacombe, Northamptonshire. These five bells augmented the single bell in the bell tower to a ring of six.

=== 18th and 19th centuries ===
Apart from regular minor maintenance each year, the next major work to the bells occurred in 1741. The second bell, which had cracked the previous year, was recast by Abel Rudhall of Gloucester, along with every bell in the tower other than George Oldfield's tenor bell. Rudhall also cast two new lighter bells to make a ring of eight and hung them on new fittings in a new frame. In 1820, during work to the frame by the townsman John Jarrett, the tenor bell fell from its hanging and cracked. The bell was recast by Thomas Mears of Whitechapel, London, at a cost of £238 but by 1824, the bill had still not been paid. The weight of the new tenor was slightly larger, at 31 long cwt 0 qrs 21 lb (1,584 kilograms (3,492 lb).

During 1875, Whites of Appleton rehung the bells in a new timber frame that had been provided by George Vale, a local craftsman. A few full peals were attempted on the bells following this rehanging but were unsuccessful due to the difficulty of ringing them. The first peal in the tower was eventually scored on 27 December 1889 but with considerable difficulty, for it required three men to ring the tenor.

This was the only full peal scored on those bells, and by the following year, the bells were condemned due to concerns about the ability of the frame to support their weight. This was confirmed in an inspection by John Taylor & Co in 1898 who said they had "never seen such a thin frame for such heavy bells". They proposed a full rehang in a new frame but due to the financial situation of the parish, this never occurred. Instead, an Ellacombe chiming apparatus was installed for £20 to allow all 8 bells to be chimed by a single ringer.

=== 20th century ===
In 1909, a quote by James Barwell & Co of Birmingham was accepted for £104 to rehang the bells in a new cast-iron frame. The following year, two donors gave enough money to allow the bells to be augmented to ten with two new lighter treble bells, also cast at Barwell's foundry. The bells were tuned and the larger bells had their canons removed, reducing the weight of the tenor to 29 long cwt 2 qrs 2 lb (1,499 kilograms (3,305 lb). The total cost of the rehang and augmentation was £600. The bells were rededicated by Huyshe Yeatman-Biggs, Bishop of Worcester, on 25 June 1910.

During the late 1930s, the condition of the tower itself was causing concern and a restoration scheme was mooted. Compared to the rings being cast by John Taylor & Co of Loughborough and Gillett & Johnston of Croydon at the time, Evesham's bells were considered inferior so the restoration plans included the recasting of the bells. However, the restoration of both the tower and the bells had to be put on hold due to the outbreak of the Second World War in 1939. It would not be until 1947 that the newly-formed 'Bell Tower Restoration Committee' were in a position to consider the plans again.

=== Modern recasting ===
In 1948, Gillett & Johnston and John Taylor & Co were both invited to tender for the complete recasting and rehanging of the bells, to include the casting of two new trebles to provide up to a ring of twelve bells. Gillett and Johnston's quote of £2,700 was recommended by the committee to be accepted. However, in 1949, Mears & Stainbank of Whitechapel were also invited to quote for the job. Due to the condition of the tower, it was decided to postpone the recasting of the bells until such time that the tower had been restored, so in 1950, following its restoration, Gillett & Johnston and John Taylor & Company were invited to tender again.

Gillett & Johnston's quote was £2,880 and John Taylor & Co's was £2,944. The quote from Taylor's was favoured despite the slightly higher cost due to the neater frame design, layout and the slightly lower height at which the bells would be hung in the tower. The faculty for the recasting of the bells was granted by the Diocese of Worcester on 5 February 1951, with Taylor's receiving the contract. The bells, frame and their fittings were removed from the tower in the spring of 1951 and sent to their foundry on Freehold Street in Loughborough, Leicestershire.

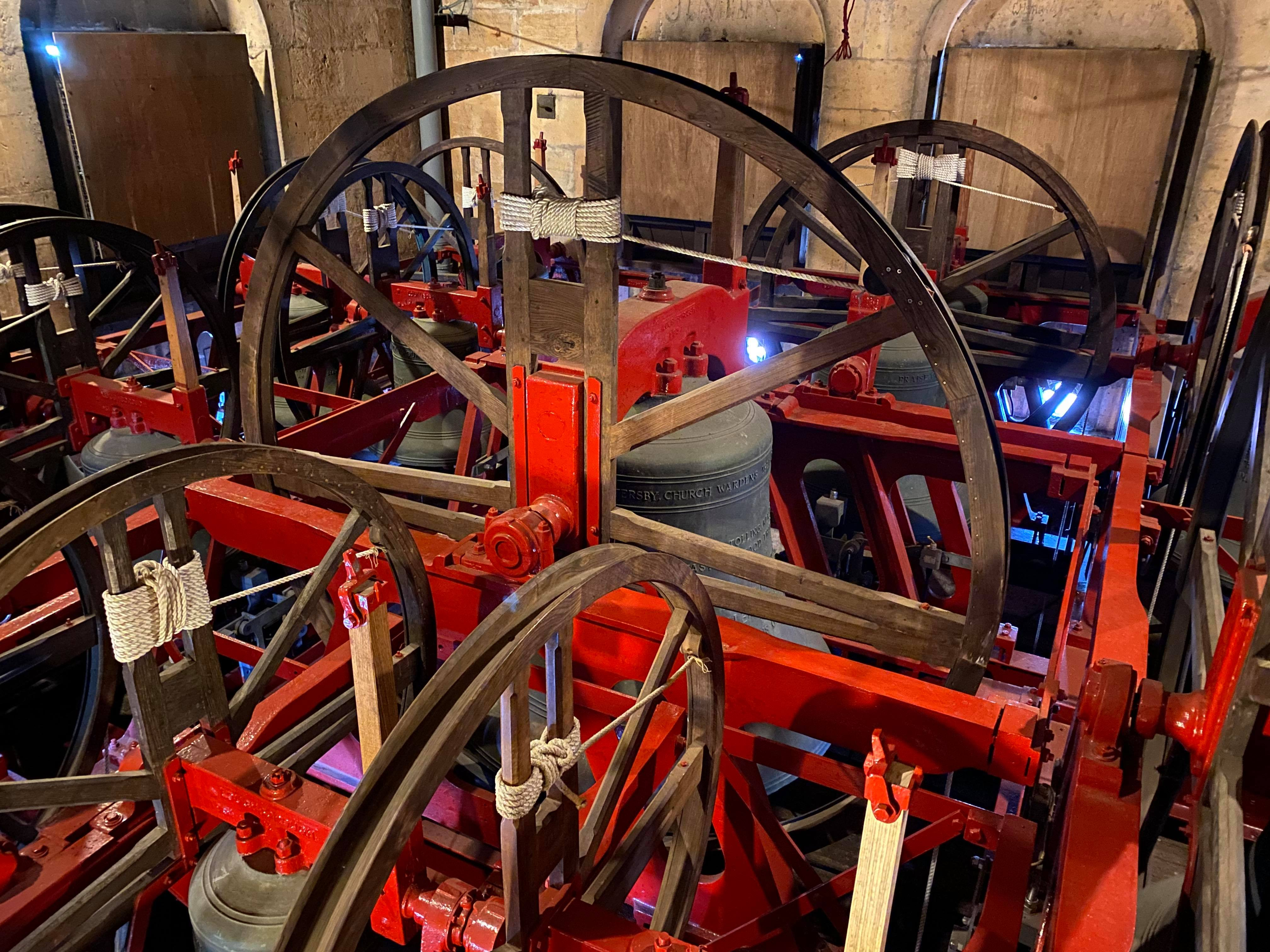
The bells in the belfry following frame repainting in 2017. Tenor bell centre.

The bells were recast by John Taylor & Co in 1951, with additional metal, to make a slightly heavier ring of twelve. The size and scale of the bells were based upon the 11th of the ring of twelve at Worcester Cathedral, which had all been cast by Taylor's in 1928. The 11th at the cathedral weighs 34 long cwt 3 qrs 4 lb (1,767 kg or 3,896 lb) and has a diameter of 56.88 inches (144.5 cm); the new tenor bell for Evesham weighs 35 long cwt 2 qrs 20 lb (1,813 kg or 3,996 lb) and also has a diameter of 56.88 inches; both bells strike the note C^{#}.

The bells were hung in a new cast-iron frame for 13 bells, allowing for the future casting of a semitone bell. Uniquely, the frame featured an independent space for the new tenor bell in the centre of the tower, not touched by any other part of the frame, so that the tenor bell would not be affected by the forces generated by the other bells in the tower. The bells were dedicated by William Wilson Cash, Bishop of Worcester, on 8 December 1951, giving Worcestershire its second ring of twelve, after Worcester Cathedral. The new bells were described in the Ringing World as "the finest peal of twelve in a radius of many, many miles". The tenor bell has a reputation amongst ringers for the ease at which it can be rung. The total cost of the recasting and rehanging was £3,250.

=== Recent developments ===
In 1976, Walter Wornick, a New Yorker, funded the addition of a semitone bell to sit between the 6th and 7th bells in the frame; Taylor's had anticipated this occurring and thus had left a space for it in 1951. The semitone bell, called a flat sixth, was cast in 1976 at Taylor's in memory of Wornick's father. The bell was dedicated on 4 December 1976. This flat sixth bell, when substituted for the natural sixth, allows a lighter octave to be rung, using the 2nd bell as the treble and the 9th bell as the tenor. The 9th weighs 14 long cwt 2 qrs 26 lb (748 kg or 1,650 lb), less than half that of the tenor, which makes teaching new ringers easier.

At the same time, the ringing room was split into two sections, an upper and a lower room, by the addition of a new floor. Since then, the ringing room has been on the upper section, the lower section is empty.

In 1992, Wornick funded the addition of a 14th bell, another semitone, to sit between the treble and the tenor in the frame. Called an 'extra treble', this bell augments the lighter eight to a lighter ten, by using the extra treble and normal treble in addition to those used for the lighter eight. Like the other bells in the tower, this bell was also cast by Taylor's.

Following the restoration of the tower from 2015 to 2016, the bells received major maintenance by Taylor's, which included the repainting of the frame and the checking/replacement of moving parts. The bells are popular with visiting ringers and they are considered amongst both the finest products of the Taylor foundry and the finest rings of bells in the world.

== Clock and chimes ==
=== History ===
The first reference to a clock at Evesham Abbey is in 1546 when the aforementioned survey mentions "one bell remaining in the clocke house". Details of this clock are unknown, but given that the tower was completed in 1532, it is likely the tower was designed with, or built with, a clock. The tower is called the 'clocke house' several times in surviving documents from the 16th century, but the first time any details appear is in John Leland's Antiquarii de rebus britannicis collectanea, in which he records that the clock dial not only shows the hour of the day, but also the phases of the moon.

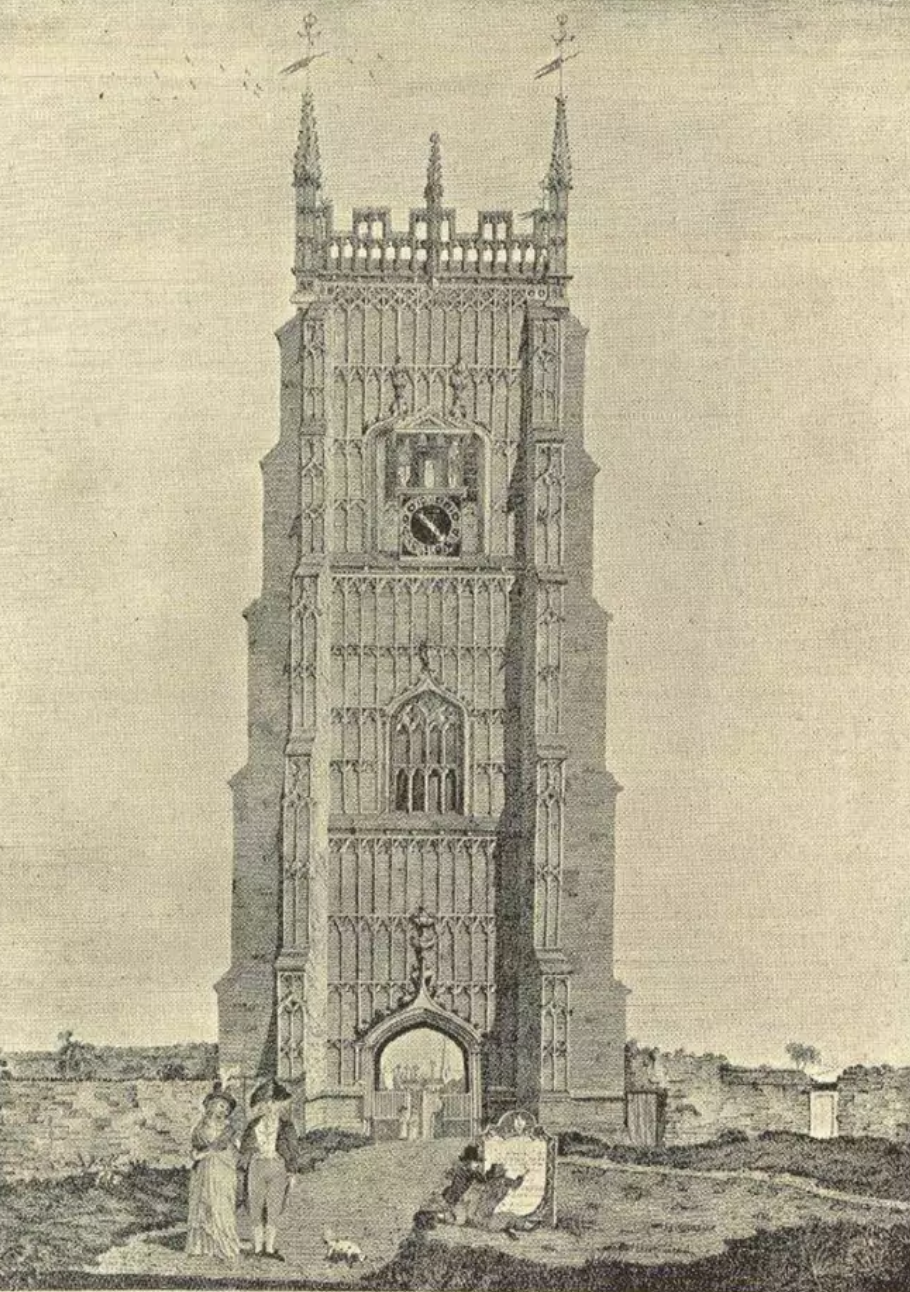
Evesham Bell Tower as it appeared in 1794, showing the clock

The first recorded image of the tower is a drawing by Thomas Dingley between 1670 and 1680, where a clock face, supported by jacks, obscures one of the sets of belfry windows. The maker of the clock is unknown. The next reference to the clock is in the church accounts, dated 14 April 1731, when the moon dial of the clock face was repaired by William Harley, at a cost of 1 shilling. The clock was overhauled again by Harley, this time in 1740 when he also repaired the chimes. This is the earliest record of the chimes themselves. In 1742, the clock and the chimes were replaced by John Steight of Pershore, reflecting the augmentation and recasting of the bells the previous year. That work cost £27.10s.

By 1774, the clock needed repairs, and at a parish meeting on 17 August, the parish employed Thomas Perkins and John Field to remove the clock, repair it and re-erect it on the tower. The meeting also mentions that the wooden figures or 'jacks', suited in armour, placed on the tower to strike the bells with hammers, needed restoration. The clock that was removed in 1774 was found to not be in a good enough condition to repair, so a new clock was installed by William Worton of Birmingham. The chimes were not reinstalled until 1777. The clock face on the eastern side of the tower was replaced again in 1809.

In 1845, the first mention of the suggested removal of the wooden jacks appears, in George May's survey of Evesham. May describes their appearance as a piece of "carved absurdity", obscuring the tracery of the belfry windows. This appears to have made some impression, for in October 1848, Solomon Hunt removed the clock dials, jacks and canopy from the belfry windows. Two new clock faces, made by C. J. Husband, were installed in August 1848 by John Dones from Worcester. The jacks now reside in the Almonry Heritage Centre.

The clock and chimes were renovated again in 1877, this time by Gillett & Bland of Croydon (predecessors of Gillett & Johnston). The work, which lasted until 1878, included a new movement and mechanism for the clock, and a carillon to play tunes on the bells. The clock faces were regilded. Gillett & Johnston overhauled the carillon in 1906.

During the restoration of the bells by Barwell & Co in 1910, J. B. Joyce & Co of Whitchurch, Shropshire, overhauled the clock and the chimes for £70, and added an additional 7 tunes to the carillon machine. The clock and chimes would be restored again as part of the 1947−1953 restoration of the tower. In 1949, it was agreed by the committee that five firms would be invited to tender for the replacement of the clock and chimes, and to include the addition of a third clock face on the south side of the tower. Smiths of Derby won the contract to overhaul the clock and chimes, which they did by replacing the clock mechanism and providing two new chiming barrels to play tunes on the newly recast bells.

During the late 20th century, the carillon slowly deteriorated in condition, to the point where it no longer played any recognisable tunes, and had to be dismantled. A new clock and chime mechanism was installed in 2002 by Joyce of Whitechurch, using a Smiths of Derby-provided control system which featured 54 pre-programmed tunes played at three hour intervals during the day. The cost of the project to replace and renew the equipment in 2002 cost £35,000. The clock and chimes were dedicated by Dr. Peter Selby, Bishop of Worcester, in March 2002.

==== Tunes ====
There are 54 tunes installed in the carillon machine, arranged into 9 weekly groups depending on the season of the church calendar. The tunes include "Abide with Me", "Amazing Grace", "Away in a Manger", "Ding Dong Merrily on High", "Hark! The Herald Angels Sing", "In the Bleak Midwinter", "Loch Lomond" and "Love Divine All Love's Excelling". There is also the ability to place a local tune, called "Evesham Andante", composed by Edward Elgar for a group of musicians in the town. The tune is regularly played in his memory. The carillon is temporarily disconnected when the bells are rung full circle by ringers.

== Similar towers ==
During the Middle Ages, many monasteries and cathedrals in the British Isles had detached or freestanding bell towers. Using freestanding bell towers had several advantages; it allowed the towers in a large church to be used as a lantern, by opening up the floors and allowing light to enter the building, and also protected the bells in the event one of the main towers collapsed. Collapses were a relatively common occurrence, with both Hereford and Worcester cathedrals suffering tower collapses, the latter twice.

However, many of these detached bell towers have been demolished, leaving Evesham as a rare example of a medieval freestanding bell tower. Examples of other medieval freestanding bell towers are at:

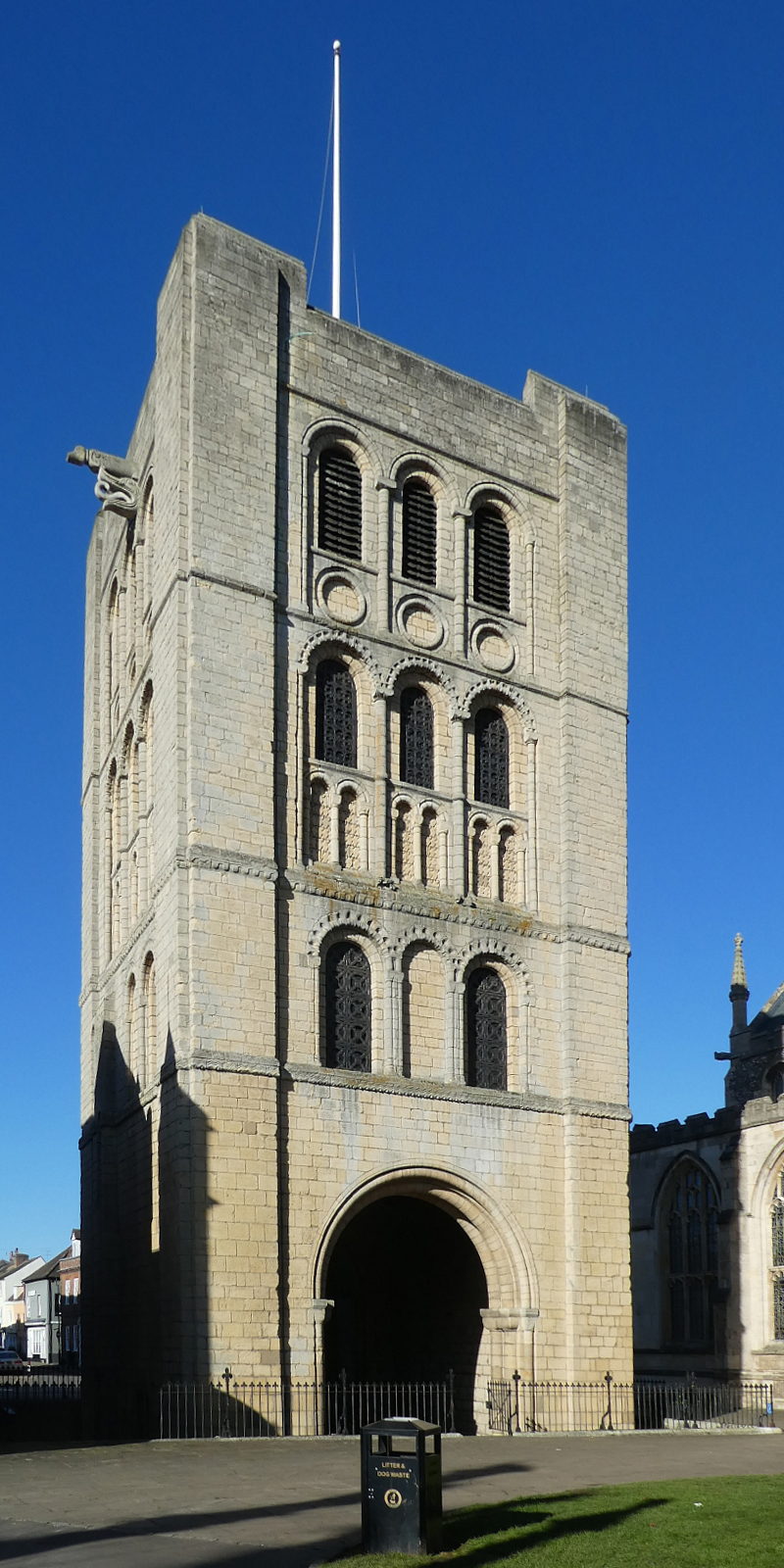
The Norman Tower, Bury St Edmunds

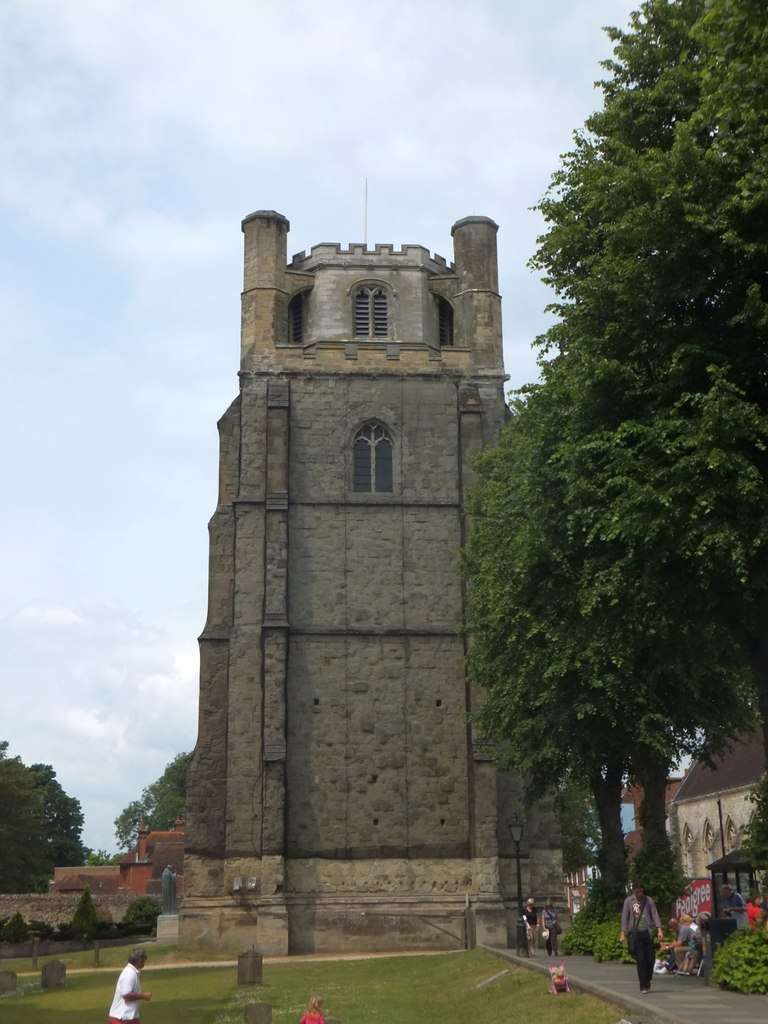
Chichester Cathedral

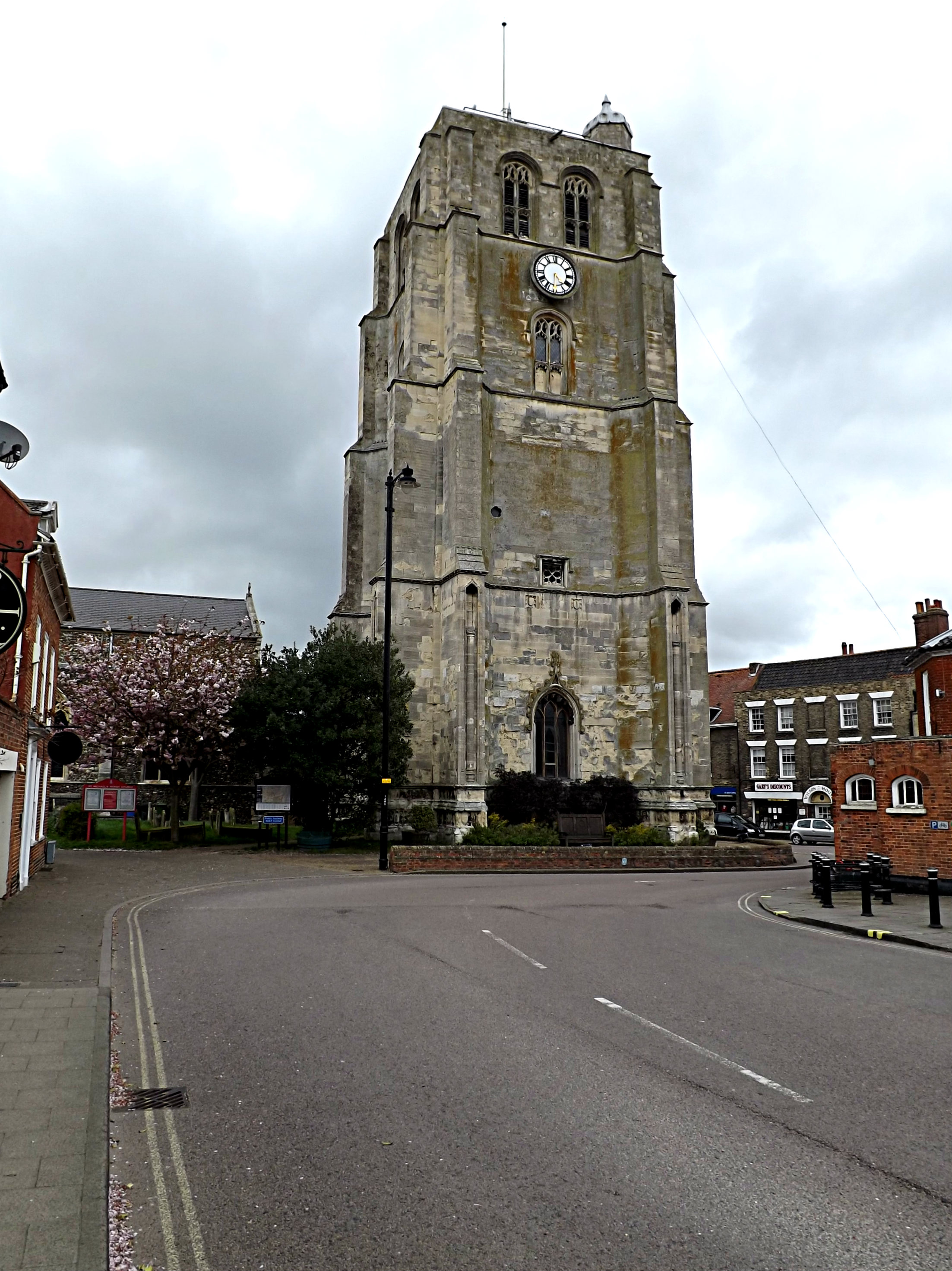
Beccles Bell Tower

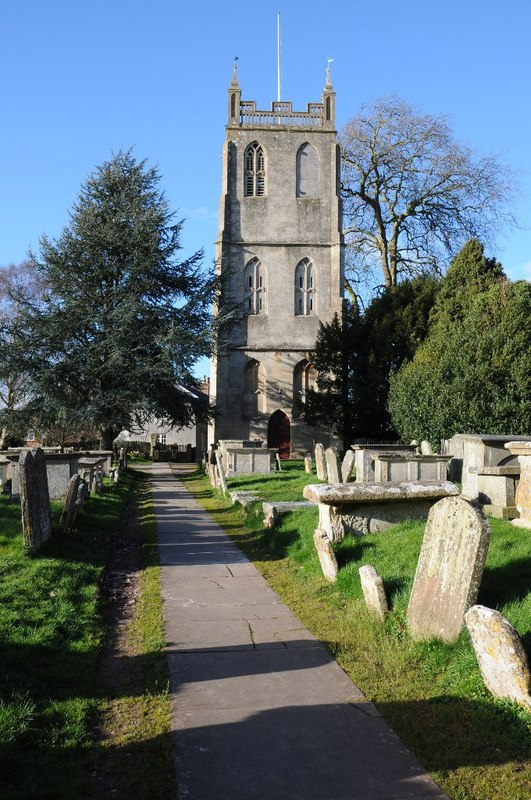
Berkeley, Gloucestershire

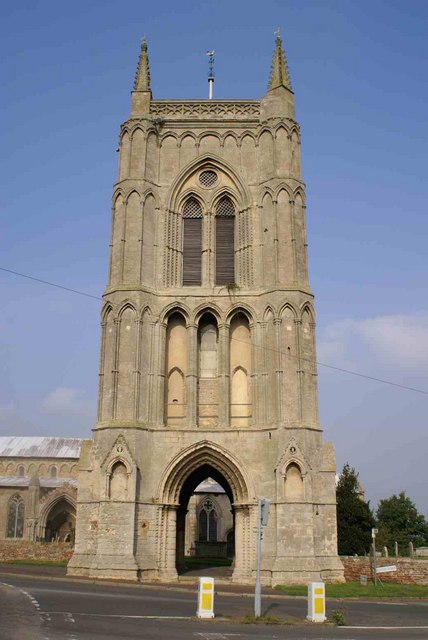
West Walton, Norfolk
