= Evesham =

Historic market town in Worcestershire, England

Coordinates: 52.092°N 1.947°W

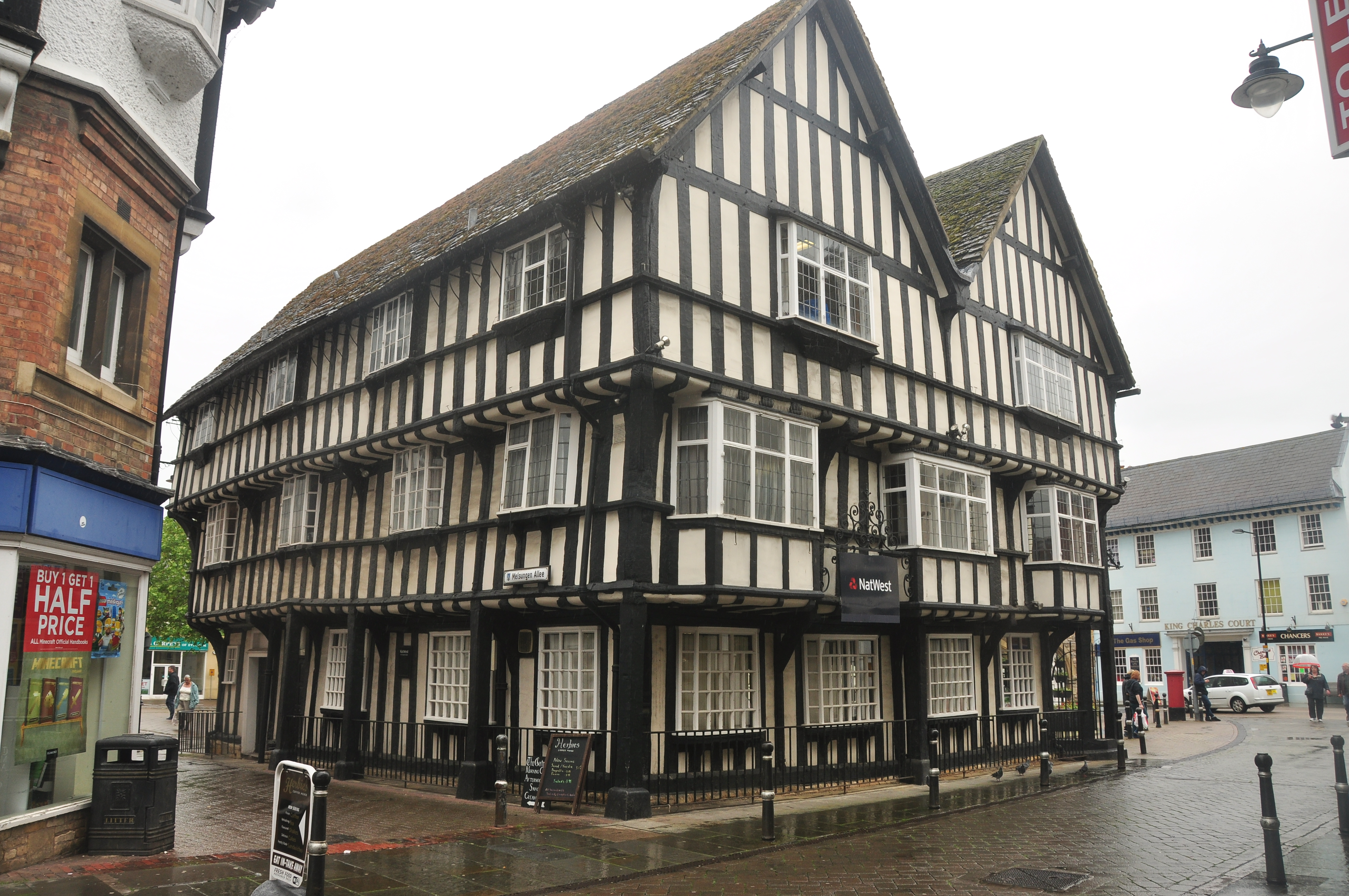
- An historic building in Evesham

- Location within Worcestershire
- Population: 27,684 (2021 Census)
- OS grid reference: SP0343
- District: Wychavon
- Shire county: Worcestershire
- Region: West Midlands
- Country: England
- Sovereign state: United Kingdom
- Post town: EVESHAM
- Postcode district: WR11
- Dialling code: 01386
- Police: West Mercia
- Fire: Hereford and Worcester
- Ambulance: West Midlands
- UK Parliament: Droitwich and Evesham

Evesham (/ˈiːv(ɪ)ʃəm, ˈiːsəm/) is a market town and civil parish in the Wychavon district of Worcestershire, in the West Midlands region of England. It is located roughly equidistant between Worcester, Cheltenham and Stratford-upon-Avon. It lies within the Vale of Evesham, an area comprising the flood plain of the River Avon, which has been renowned for market gardening.

The town was founded around an 8th-century abbey, one of the largest in Europe, which was destroyed during the dissolution of the monasteries in the 16th century, with only Abbot Lichfield's Bell Tower remaining. During the 13th century, one of the two main battles of the Second Barons' War took place near Evesham, marking the victory of Prince Edward, who later became Edward I of England; this was the Battle of Evesham.

The town centre, situated within a meander of the river, is subjected regularly to flooding. The 2007 floods were the most severe in the town's history. As at the 2021 census, Evesham has a population of 27,684.

== History ==
=== Toponymy ===
Evesham is derived from Old English homme or ham, and Eof, the name of a swineherd in the service of Egwin, third Bishop of Worcester. It was originally named Homme or Haum; it was recorded as Eveshomme in 709 and Evesham in 1086. The second part of the name (homme or ham) typically only signifies a home or dwelling but, in Worcestershire and Gloucestershire, it was commonly applied to land on the sides of a river, generally in bends of a river, which were liable to flooding. (Note: Some sources, notably Tindal, incorrectly cite 'holm' as a source for the town's name, but this was due to lack of knowledge of early forms of the name. Some sources (such as Rudge, Tindall, Lewis, May) give the name of the swineherd as Eoves; it should be Eof, as explained in 1920 by historian O. G. Knapp: "It is impossible that Eoves should have been the Swineherd's name for several reasons. In the first place the letter 'V' is not found in the Saxon alphabet, having been brought to this country by the Normans; so that Eofeshamme, given in one of the charters, indicates the older and better form of the name... But even if Eofes is older and more accurate than Eoves it cannot be the original form of the name. A moment's reflection will show that if Evesham means the meadow of some person, the name of that person must be in what Grammarians call the Genitive (or Possessive) Case, Singular. This in modern English is nearly always denoted by 's placed at the end of the word; the apostrophe showing that a vowel has dropped out of the termination. Anglo-Saxon had a larger selection of endings for the Genitive Case, but the one in –es (the original form of our modern 's) belonged to what are called 'strong' Masculine nouns, which usually ended in a consonant. Eofes, therefore, would be the natural Genitive of a man's proper name, Eof. Ferguson suggests that the original form of the name might have been Eofa, but such a name would correspond to the 'weak' nouns which made their Genitive by adding not –es but –an; in which case the name of the town would have been Eofanham, as is shown in the case of Offenham, the Ham of Offa or Uffa. We may therefore take it as certain that the real name of the Swineherd was not Eoves, Eofes, or even Eofa, but Eof. And this is not a mere theoretical reconstruction, for Eof was actually a Saxon name... The form Eoves, though current for many centuries, is a mere blunder.")

=== Abbey ===
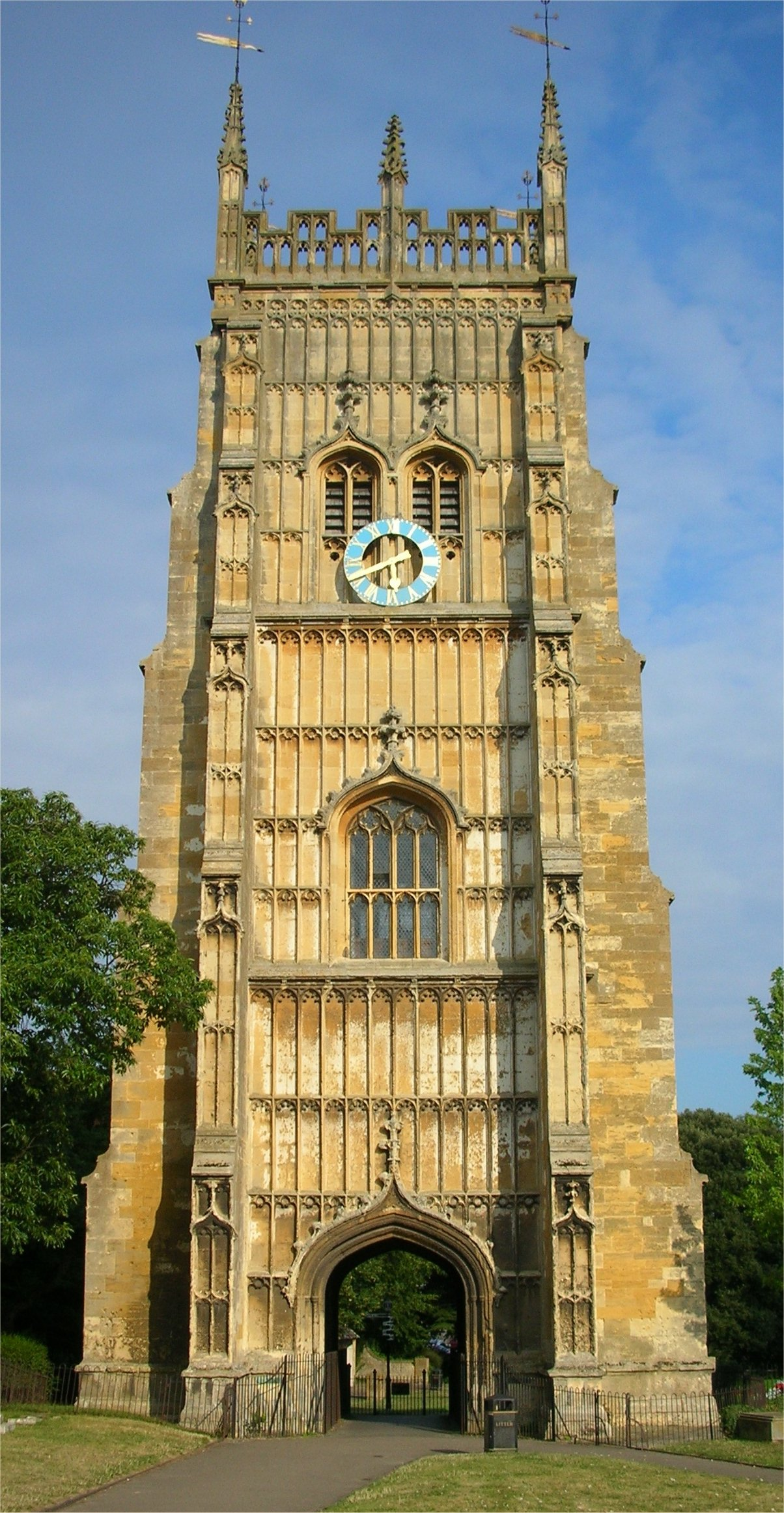
Evesham Bell Tower

Evesham Abbey, which became possibly the third-largest in England, was founded by Egwin of Evesham, the third Bishop of Worcester (now venerated as a saint in the Catholic Church) about AD 701, following the vision of the Virgin Mary to a local swineherd or shepherd named Eof.

An entry in the Domesday Book of 1086 lists Evesham, mentioning: "Two free men; Two radmen; Abbey of St Mary of Evesham; Abbey of St Mary of Pershore; Edmund, Abbot of St Mary of Pershore; Walter, Abbot of St Mary of Evesham; Aethelwig, Abbot of St Mary of Evesham; King William as donor; Odo, Bishop of Bayeux; Ranulph; Turstin, Abbot of St Mary of Pershore; Walter Ponther; Westminster, Gilbert Crispin, Abbot of St Peter."

The abbey was redeveloped and extended after the Norman Conquest, employing many tradesmen and significantly contributing to the growth of Evesham. Income for the abbey came from pilgrims to the abbey to celebrate the vision and visitors to the tomb of Simon de Montfort. As a result of Henry VIII's dissolution of the monasteries, Evesham Abbey was dismantled in 1540 and sold as building stone, leaving little but the Lichfield Bell Tower. The abbey remains are a Scheduled Ancient Monument (no. WT253); parts of the abbey complex, Abbot Reginald's Wall (registered monument) and the ruins of Abbot Chryton's Wall (Grade II), are listed buildings managed by English Heritage. The abbey's coat of arms is used as the crest of Prince Henry's High School. Two surviving buildings with links to the abbey are the Middle Littleton Tythe Barn and the Almonry Museum and Heritage Centre, which is housed in the old almonry of the abbey and also displays artefacts from excavations there.

=== Battle ===
Following the Battle of Lewes on 14 May 1264, where Simon de Montfort had gained control of Parliament, the Battle of Evesham on 4 August 1265 was the second of the two main battles of the Second Barons' War. It marked the victory of Prince Edward, who led the 8,000-strong army of his father, Henry III, over the 6,000 men of de Montfort and the beginning of the end of the rebellion. The battle was a massacre; de Montfort's army were trapped in the horseshoe bend of the river, Although Simon de Montfort and his son were killed, Prince Edward's victory was not decisive towards the King's hold on the country and the struggle continued until 1267; after which the Kingdom of England returned to a period of unity and progress that was to last until the early 1290s. During the battle, the royal army wore the Saint George's Cross as their distinguishing mark. It is believed that the Battle was one of the first times that the cross was used to officially represent England. According to the chronicler William Rishanger, when de Montfort saw the advance of the royal troops, he exclaimed that "They have not learned that for themselves, but were taught it by me."

=== Town ===
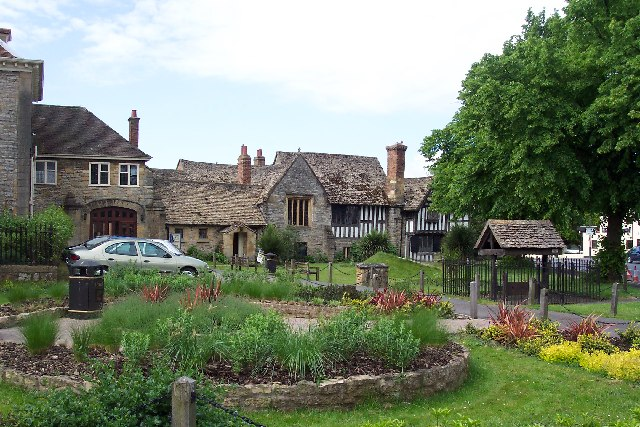
The Almonry, originally part of Evesham Abbey

The medieval town developed within the meander of the River Avon, while Bengeworth developed to the east on the opposite bank of the river. In 1055, a market was granted to the Saxon town by King Edward. In the 11th century, Leofric, Earl of Mercia, had a hunting lodge at Bengeworth. Leofric founded Holy Trinity Church with his wife Godifu (Lady Godiva). Godifu, who died in around 1067, is possibly buried at the abbey. During the reign of Stephen, King of England, William de Beauchamp erected an adulterine castle at Bengeworth, whose occupants vied for control of the town and abbey. When Abbot William had the castle destroyed between 1149 and 1159, he consecrated the site as a graveyard to prevent the castle being rebuilt. Evesham was a borough and market town in the hundred of Blackenhurst, in Worcestershire; after 1837, head of the Evesham Poor Law Union, which took responsibility for the administration and funding of the Poor Law, built a workhouse for that area.

== Governance ==
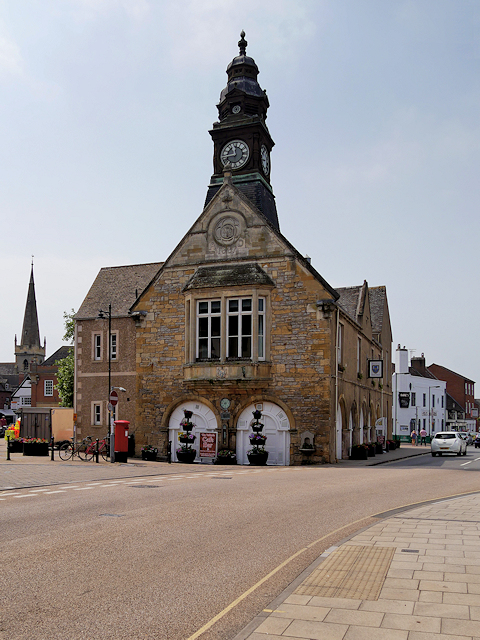
Evesham Town Hall

Evesham Borough Council, which was based at the town hall, administered the town until 1974, when Wychavon District Council became the local authority. It is now a town and civil parish, governed at the lowest tier of local government by Evesham Town Council, part of the Wychavon District of the County of Worcestershire. Residents in the eight council electoral wards are represented by 24 elected members. The wards, based on streets, are represented by elected councillors: Abbey (1 councillor), Avon (2), Bengeworth (5), Fairfield (1), Great Hampton (3), Little Hampton (5), South (5) and Twyford (2). The council is chaired by a mayor and has a Town Clerk, who acts as chief officer.

== Geography ==
Evesham is situated on a horseshoe-shaped peninsula, almost completely surrounded by water in a meander of the River Avon between Stratford-upon-Avon and Tewkesbury. The modern town encompasses Bengeworth and Greater and Little Hampton, which were originally independent villages on the opposite bank of the river. The town is linked to Bengeworth by Workman Bridge and Hampton by Abbey Bridge, or New Bridge, the first completely structural concrete bridge in the country. The Cotswold hills stretch from the east to the south-west; to the west, the area is bounded by the Malvern Hills. To the north, the land is flat with gentle undulations. The Avon, a tributary of the River Severn, is navigable but mainly used by leisure traffic and there is a marina, providing moorings.

The River Avon at Evesham has always been susceptible to heavy flooding, which is well documented from the 13th century. In May 1924, floods at Evesham ranked fifth in the annual flood list 1848 to 1935. In May 1998, Evesham was one of the towns worst hit by record flooding along the River Avon. The river rose 19 feet (5.8 m) in just a few hours, sinking tethered narrowboats, flooding areas of Bengeworth and threatening the 19th-century Workman Bridge, as static homes from a riverside caravan site broke up and became wedged in its arches. In July 2007, Evesham had its heaviest rainfall for 200 years, reaching more than 320% of the average in some areas. In the Severn catchment, it caused some of the heaviest floods recorded; in Evesham, the flooding was the worst in its recorded history.

=== Climate chart ===
Evesham

Climate chart (precipitation, max. and min. temperature)
J	F	M	A	M	J	J	A	S	O	N	D
38 7 3	25 8 2	24 11 3	32 13 5	27 17 7	36 19 10	31 22 12	39 22 12	40 18 10	44 14 8	37 10 5	33 7 3
- █ Average max. and min. temperatures in °C
- █ Precipitation totals in mm
Imperial conversion
J	F	M	A	M	J	J	A	S	O	N	D
1.5 45 37	1 46 36	1 51 38	1.3 55 42	1.1 62 45	1.4 67 50	1.2 72 54	1.5 71 53	1.6 65 50	1.7 58 46	1.4 50 41	1.3 45 37
- █ Average max. and min. temperatures in °F
- █ Precipitation totals in inches

== Demography ==
At the 2001 UK census, Evesham had a total population of 22,304. For every 100 females, there were 96.7 males. The average household size was 2.3. Of those aged 16–74 in Evesham, 57.5% had no academic qualifications or one General Certificate of Secondary Education (GCSE), above the figures for all of the Wychavon district (44.2%) and England (45.5%). According to the census, 2.4% were unemployed and 9.4% were economically inactive. 20.1% of the population were under the age of 16 and 7.7% were aged 75 and over; the mean age of the people of the civil parish was 38.2. 69.9% of residents described their health as "good", similar to the average of 69.1% for the wider district.

== Economy ==
Due to its exceptionally fertile soil, market gardening is carried out on a commercial scale in the surrounding area; the Vale of Evesham is known for its production of fruit and vegetables. A distinctive form of leasehold tenure, known as the Evesham Custom, still regulates market garden tenancies in the area. A decline in the second half of the 20th century resulted in the closing of Evesham's Smithfield Market, while the Central Market stopped being used for produce auctions.

Between 1983 and 2008, Evesham was home to computer manufacturer Evesham Micros, later renamed Evesham Technology. It was a significant contributor to the United Kingdom's domestic computer and digital television market. At its peak, the company employed up to 300 people with a chain of 19 retail stores in towns and cities throughout the UK. It went into liquidation in 2008.

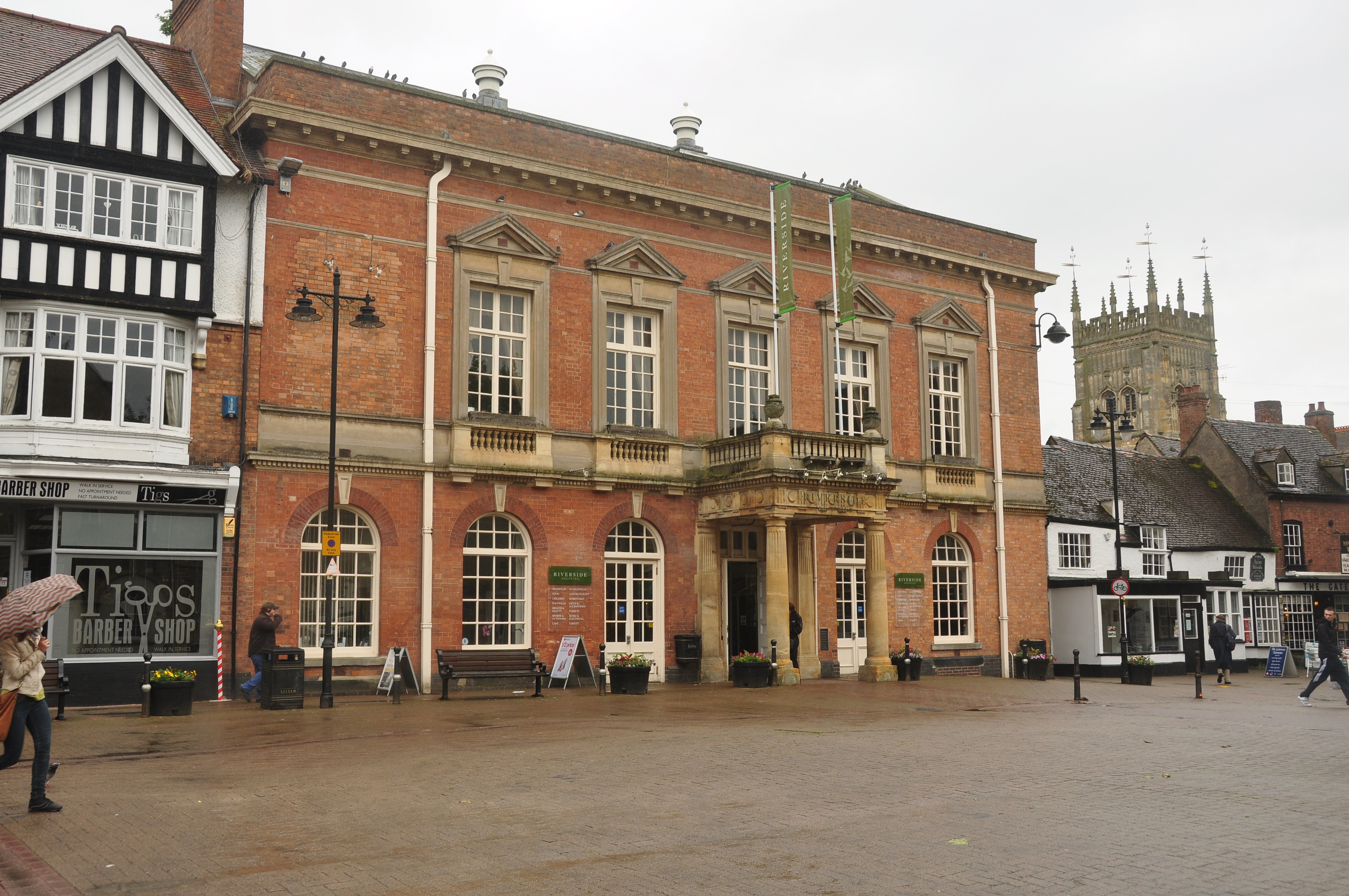
The Riverside Shopping Centre

Evesham's town centre provides a number of food outlets and some retail along its traditional high street and the Riverside Shopping Centre, though the latter is struggling with only 9 of the 40 units being occupied as of May 2024.

Evesham is home to several out-of-town retail parks that draw shoppers away from the centre; these include Four Pools Lane Retail Park, Evesham Shopping Park, the Sinclair Retail Park, Charity Crescent Retail Park and The Valley. The Valley formerly Evesham Country Park, is a large retail and leisure park with a diversity of stores, restaurants and cafés. The Vale includes the Evesham Vale Light Railway miniature railway.

== Transport ==
=== Railway ===
Evesham railway station lies on the Cotswold Line, which connects Oxford and Hereford. Great Western Railway operates generally hourly services to London Paddington, with hourly services in the other direction to Worcester Shrub Hill, Worcester Foregate Street, Great Malvern or Hereford.

=== Buses ===
Several bus routes serve Evesham, including:

- Stagecoach Midlands run services towards Stratford-upon-Avon
- First Midlands runs services towards Worcester
- Diamond Bus runs services towards Tewkesbury and Redditch
- N N Cresswell runs services towards Broadway.

=== Roads ===
In 1728, the London-to-Worcester road through Evesham was turnpiked, as was the road to Alcester in 1778, improving communications in the area. Evesham is at the junction of the A46 and A44 trunk roads – the 4-mile (6 km) £7 million, A46 single-carriageway bypass to the east of the town opened in July 1987 as the A435.

Work began in September 2013 to replace the Abbey Bridge, which was completed in March 2014.

The nearest motorway is the M5, which signs Evesham from junction 6 southbound (with the A449 at Worcester), as well as from junction 9 northbound (with the A435 at Tewkesbury).

=== Water ===
The River Avon is a navigable waterway linking the River Severn at Tewkesbury to the Stratford-upon-Avon Canal at Stratford-upon-Avon. The river between the town and Stratford is managed by the Upper Avon Navigation Trust and below by the Lower Avon Navigation Trust, reflecting the administration of the river since the Restoration, when the lower Avon required only modest repairs, but significant investment was required above the town. The historic and ancient Hampton Ferry links the town to Hampton.

== Education ==
Schools in Evesham follow the three-tier education model of first school (ages 5–10), middle school (ages 10–13), and high school (ages 13–18) adopted by Wychavon District Council 1974 and completed by 1977. Twelve first (primary) schools which include state non-denominational schools, as well as Church of England Bengeworth Academy and Roman Catholic school, feed four middle schools.

The middle school send pupils to complete their secondary education at The De Montfort School and Prince Henry's High School, which originated as a grammar school established by the monastery and was re-founded by Henry VIII after the Dissolution.

The Vale of Evesham School, operated by Worcestershire County Council, caters for children from the area aged 2 – 19 with special needs, and learning disabilities.

Further education is provided by Evesham College, part of the Warwickshire College Group following the merger with South Worcestershire College (previously known as Evesham and Malvern Hills College) which caters mainly for students studying at the NVQ and BTEC level or undertaking practical vocational courses.

The nearest higher education providers are the University of Worcester and the University of Gloucestershire. A University of the Third Age was established in 2003, which had 600 members in 2010.

== Places of worship ==
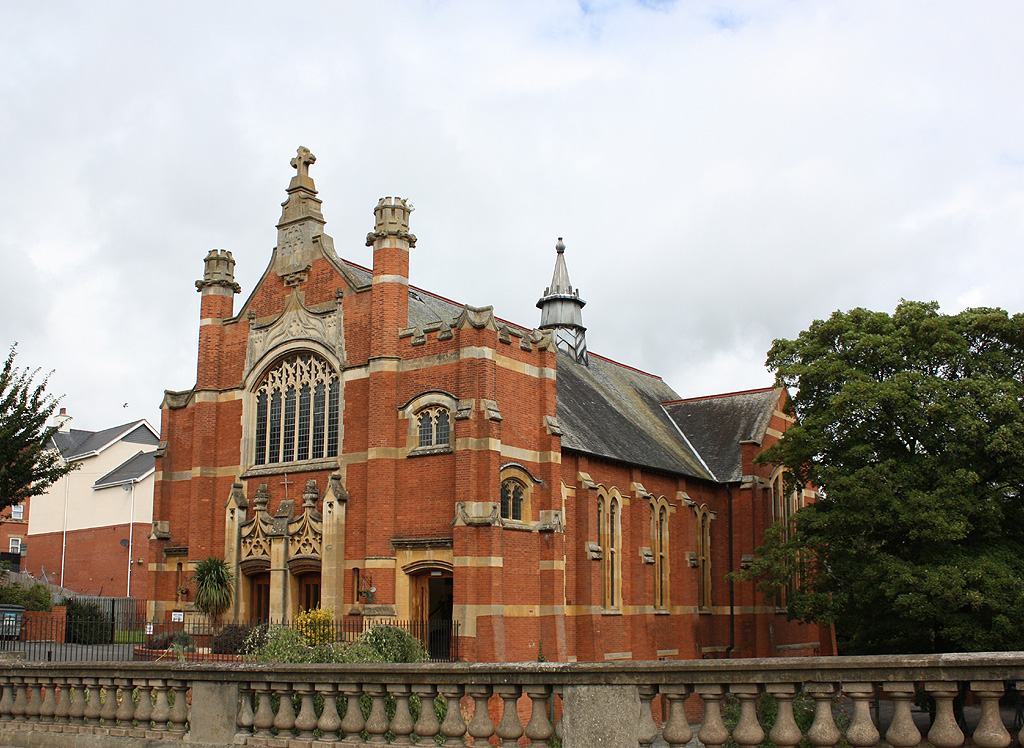
The 1906 sandstone and red brick Evesham Methodist Church on the banks of the River Avon

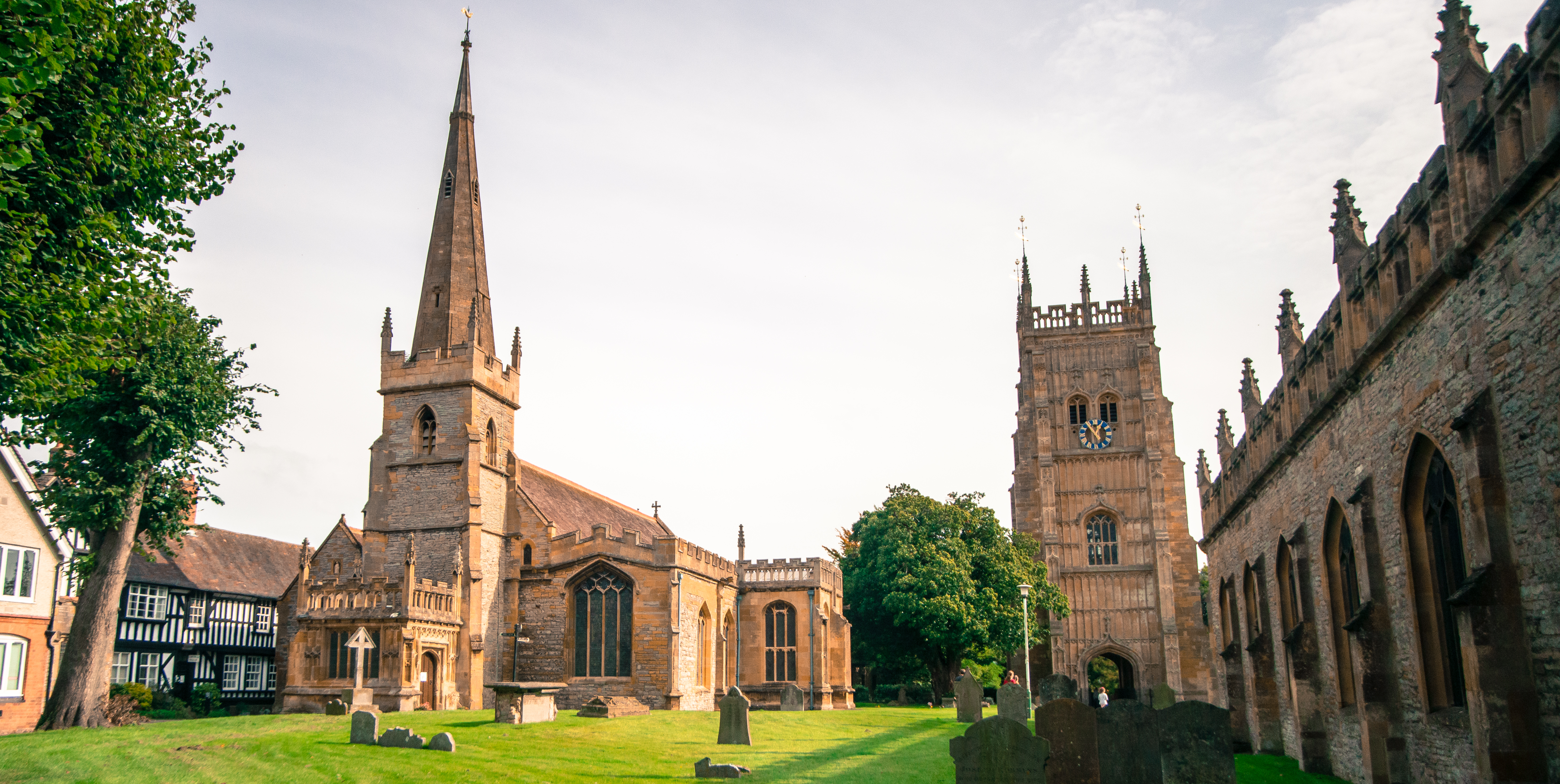
All Saints Church

It is possible that the 8th-century Anglo-Saxon Minster Church of Evesham Abbey was founded on the site of an even older church. The medieval town had two parish churches, All Saints and St Lawrence, built within the abbey precinct. Religious establishments in Evesham include All Saints Church, Evesham Baptist Church, Evesham Evangelical Church, Evesham Methodist Church, St Andrew's C of E Church, St Mary & Saint Egwin's Church, St Peter's Church, Vale Of Evesham Christian Centre, the Unitarian Chapel in Oat Street and a Quaker meeting place.

== Culture, media and sport ==
=== Culture ===
Evesham had a distinctive dialect, which locals called "Asum Grammar", or "Asum Grammer". The editor of the local newspaper quoted extracts from a fictitious dictionary of the language. In 1891, a glossary was published of words and phrases in south-east Worcestershire, comprising the district around Evesham and Pershore; this publication was itself built on that of an 1882 author identified only as "Mrs Chamberlain". Prior to the 1882 book, little attention had been paid to the dialect of "the old Worcestershire folks", despite it being "interesting and peculiar". A decline in the dialect was already being noted, attributed at that time to standardisation of English schooling, something noted also by later writers on English dialects. The dialect continues to decline, but is stronger in older generations. More recent factors in its decline are attributed to changes in the market gardening scene, where the dialect was to be heard at its fullest, and the impact of television. In the local dialect, "Asum" is a contraction of the town's name. Asum was an ale produced by the now defunct Evesham Brewery. "Eve-shum" is the more common phonetic pronunciation, but "Eve-uh-shum" is not uncommon.

The Henrician Evesham was built in 1979; it is staffed and operated by volunteers and managed by The Prince Henry's Evesham Arts Theatre Trust. It provides a venue for professional and amateur performance. Events hosted include drama, stand-up comedy, brass bands, orchestras, pantomime and ballet. The centre has a raked 312-seat auditorium, full technical facilities and film projection and a 60-seat studio space for smaller productions. The centre's foyer it is an exhibition space for local artists. The centre was managed by the Evesham Arts Association until 2020. The Henrician Evesham is now managed by Prince Henry's Evesham Arts Theatre Trust, a registered charity.

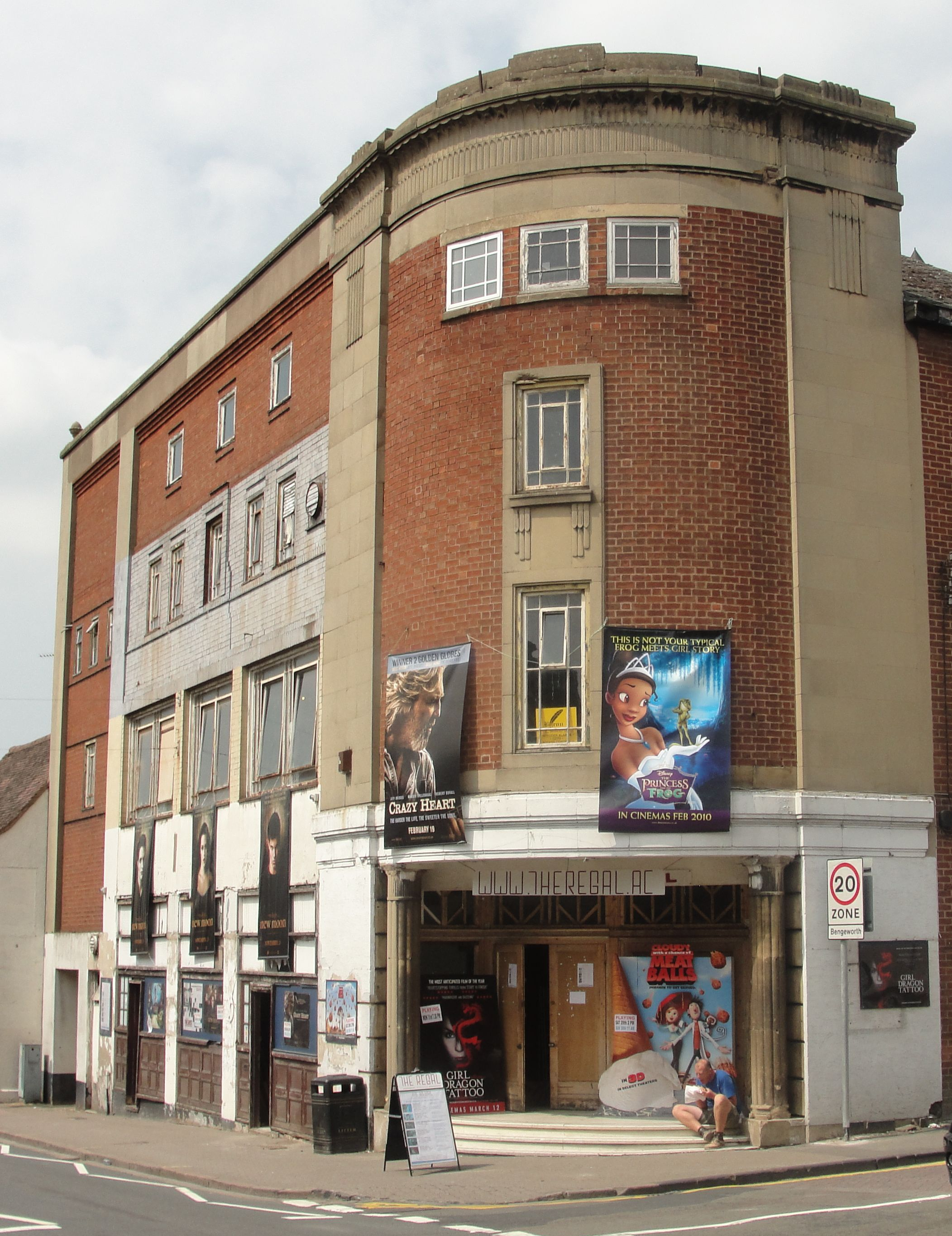
The art deco Regal Cinema

The Regal Cinema reopened in December 2009. Its Grade II listed building was designed in 1932 by architect Hurley Robinson, who was responsible for several public buildings in classical and Art Deco styles, including 55 other cinemas; the Regal is the most important surviving example. In 2009, the cinema signed a contract to show all Universal Studios films. It also serves as a community arts centre, offering a programme of music and stand-up comedy.

The other public Art Deco building in the town is the former Plough, which replaced an 18th-century public house on the Market Place in 1936. Since then, it became a bar and grill under a variety of different names and has been recently refurbished.

Medieval Evesham and the Earl of Evesham inspired a novel Winning His Spurs by the historical fiction author G. A. Henty. A more recent novel by M.C. Beaton, entitled Agatha Raisin and the Wizard of Evesham, takes place largely in Evesham and two of the main characters visit the local sights, with descriptions. Local folklore is provided for by the Legend of Evesham surrounding the life of Eof, an 8th-century swineherd credited with the founding of the town, and St Egwin the Bishop of Worcester who founded the abbey and whose feet had been fettered and the key thrown in the River Avon. According to the legend, the key turned up in Rome inside a fish. On returning to Evesham, Egwin declared that a monastery be built on the spot where the key had been cast in the river. A major landmark is the statue of Eof by the Scottish sculptor John McKenna that was funded by the townsfolk and unveiled in the market place in June 2008.

=== Paintings ===
The Almonry Museum has an 1825 oil painting by William Robert Earl (1806–1880), which shows a distant view of the town as seen from Greenhill, site of the battle of Evesham. More local views by George Willis-Pryce are on show in the town hall. Dating from the 1890s, they include the gateway to Market Square, the entrance to the town across Workman's Bridge, and the former Hampton Ferry across the Avon. Elsewhere there is an Avon-side painting by Edward Stott in the style of Bastien-Lepage; this is titled "Feeding the Ducks" and dates from 1884, when Stott shared a cottage in North Littleton with fellow painters Walter Osborne and Nathaniel Hill.

=== Media ===
Evesham local news has been served since 1860 by the Evesham Journal, which is now part of the Newsquest (Midlands South) Ltd., a subsidiary of Gannett; it is predominantly a weekly free newspaper that is distributed over four counties. In 2007, the weekly free newspaper Evesham Observer was launched by the Midlands-based Observer-Standard series of newspapers, now the family-owned Bullivant Media.

Local news and television programmes are provided by BBC West Midlands and ITV Central. Television signals can be received from either the Sutton Coldfield or Lark Stoke TV transmitters.

BBC Hereford & Worcester broadcasts on 104 FM and 94.7, while commercial radio stations include Hits Radio Herefordshire & Worcestershire on 96.7 FM and Greatest Hits Radio Herefordshire & Worcestershire on 107.2 FM.

=== Sport ===
The Evesham Leisure Centre comprises two swimming pools, a climbing wall, a 100-station fitness room and a health & beauty salon.

Football is represented by Evesham United F.C., which plays in the Southern Football League Division One South & West. Evesham Utd also run over 20 youth teams, several girls' and women’s teams, several Disability teams and a Walking Football team.

In Rugby Union, there are senior and youth sections at Evesham Rugby Club. There is also a cricket ground. The town also has a pétanque team and a cycling club, Evesham & District Wheelers, which was founded in 1947.

The town is home to various watersports, due to its location on the river, including Evesham Rowing Club, Kayaking & Canoeing provided by the Evesham Paddle Monsters club and Evesham Sailing Club. It has two golf courses: Evesham Golf Club, which is situated outside Fladbury, and Twyford Golf Club, sited just outside Lenchwick. Evesham Vale Running Club holds its 10K race event annually.

== Amenities ==
Evesham Library, managed by Worcestershire Libraries & Learning division of Worcestershire County Council, is located in the town centre and was completely modernised following a closure for refurbishment in January 2011. It offers community services that include an online catalogue, wi-fi internet access, public internet terminals and a mobile library.

The Almonry Museum and Heritage Centre is a local museum that was opened in 1957 and is funded by the council. The museum and the Tourist Information Centre are housed together in a 14th-century half timbered building that was the home of the almoner of Evesham Abbey. Exhibits include many items of local interest including an exhibition themed on the battle of Evesham.

Evesham has a 97-bed community hospital in Waterside, outside the town centre, used mainly by the elderly and for convalescence, although consultants from major Worcester National Health Service hospitals hold clinics there. The hospital maintains a Minor Injuries Unit. The town has three health centres, providing general practitioner first care services, and a dental centre. Evesham also has several nursing and retirement homes for the care of senior citizens. The area is covered by the Midlands Air Ambulance service, which has operated from the site of Strensham motorway services since 1991.

== Notable people ==
- Alfred John Agg, Australian colonial public servant and commissioner of railways in Victoria, originally from Evesham.
- John Aldridge, a professional English and international cricketer who also played for Worcestershire, born in Evesham in 1935.
- Rob Austin, Evesham-born former racing driver who competed in the British Touring Car Championship.
- Adam Weaver, an Evesham-based British Touring Car Championship team owner of Power Maxed Racing.
- Molly Badham was a co-founder of Twycross Zoo. She trained the chimpanzees, who appeared on the famous Brooke Bond PG Tips television advertisements. Born in Evesham in 1914.
- Jim Capaldi, songwriter and founding member of Traffic, was born and raised in Evesham.
- Muzio Clementi was a celebrated classical composer, pianist, pedagogue, conductor, music publisher and piano manufacturer. He spent his final years in Evesham, where he died in 1832.
- Sir Henry Fowler, chief mechanical engineer of the Midland Railway and subsequently the London, Midland and Scottish Railway, was born in Evesham, on 29 July 1870.
- Alex Gregory, schooled in Evesham, later double Olympic gold winning rower at London 2012 and Rio 2016
- Luther Grosvenor, guitarist for Mott the Hoople and Spooky Tooth, was born and raised in Evesham.
- Harry King, a professional footballer, began his career at Evesham Star F.C.
- Robert Lanchbury is a former England cricketer who played for Gloucestershire and Worcestershire in the early 1970s. Born in Evesham in 1950.
- Alistair McGowan, impressionist and actor; born in Evesham on 24 November 1964.
- Edmund Hort New, an artist who was born and grew up in Evesham.
- Andy Preece, professional English footballer and manager. He began his career as a junior with Worcester City and subsequently played for Evesham United. Born in Evesham in 1967.
- P. J. Proby, American pop singer, lives in Evesham.
- Edward Righton was an Evesham-born cricketer who played for Worcestershire between 1911 and 1913.
- Simon de Montfort, leader of the Second Barons' War against the Crown, died at the Battle of Evesham and was buried in Evesham Abbey.
- C. H. Waddington, biologist born in Evesham in 1905.
- John Watson was born in Evesham around 1491; he was Bishop of Winchester and Chancellor of St Paul's Cathedral, London. Today's Evesham Hotel is a Tudor mansion that he built as the family home.
- John Watson, born at Bengeworth, 17th-century Bluemantle Pursuivant at the College of Arms.
- Guy Whittingham is a retired professional footballer, with over 450 appearances for a number of English clubs; born in Evesham in 1964.
- Maud H. Yardley, novelist, died in Evesham in 1954.

== Twin towns ==
Evesham is twinned with:

- Dreux, Centre-val de Loire, France
- Melsungen, Hesse, Germany
- Evesham Township, New Jersey, United States.
