= St Lawrence's Church, Evesham =

Coordinates: 52.0914°N 1.9476°W

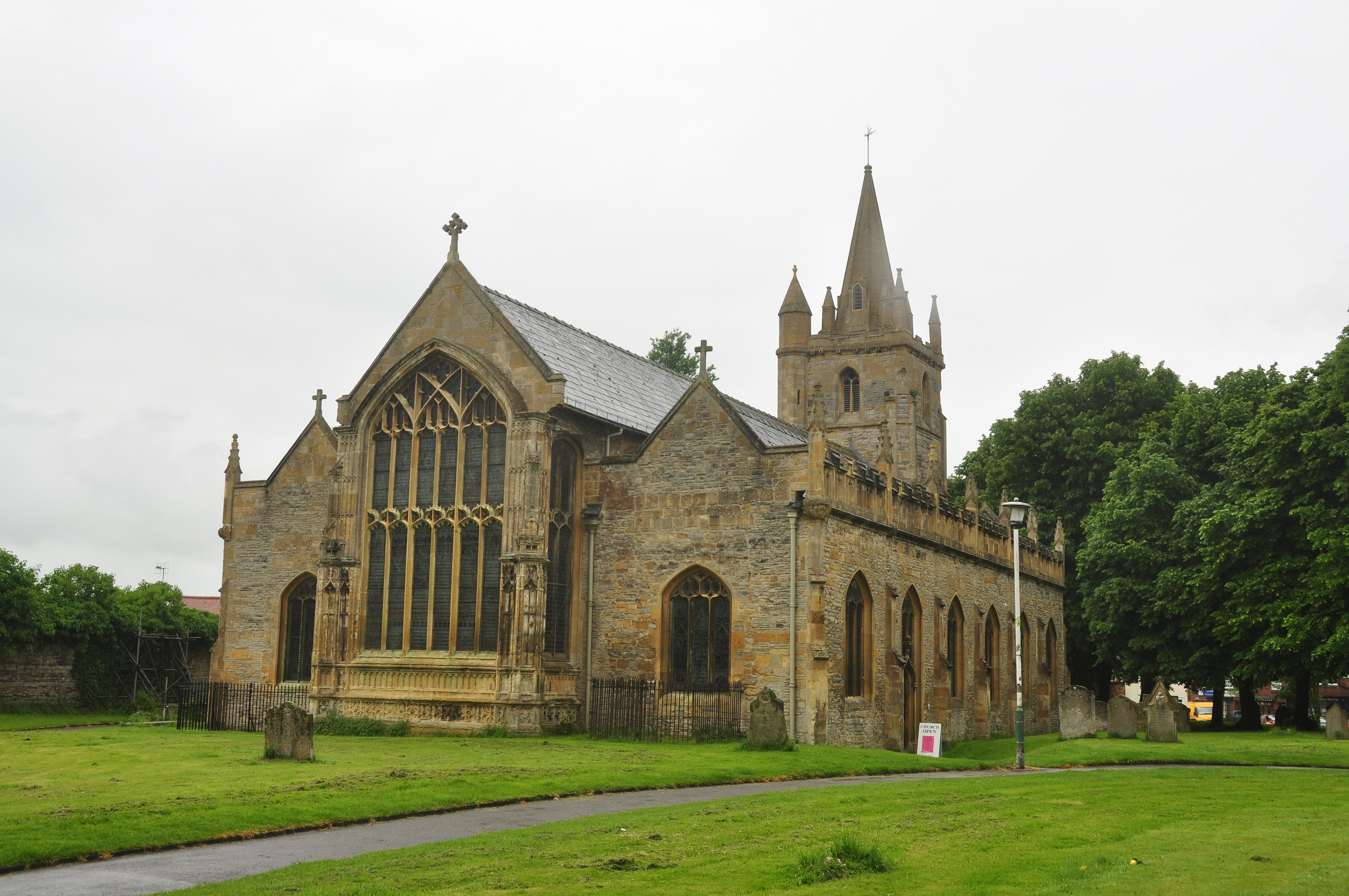
- St Lawrence's Church, Evesham, from the northeast

- Location in Worcestershire
- OS grid reference: SP 036 436
- Location: Evesham, Worcestershire
- Country: England
- Denomination: Anglican
- Website: Churches Conservation Trust

History
- Dedication: Saint Lawrence
- Dedicated: 1295

Architecture
- Functional status: Redundant
- Heritage designation: Grade II*
- Designated: 7 May 1952
- Architect: Harvey Eginton
- Architectural type: Church
- Style: Gothic, Gothic Revival
- Groundbreaking: 12th century
- Completed: 1837

Specifications
- Materials: Stone, slate roofs

St Lawrence's Church is a redundant Anglican church in the centre of the town of Evesham, Worcestershire, England. It is recorded in the National Heritage List for England as a designated Grade II* listed building, and is under the care of the Churches Conservation Trust. It stands close to All Saints Church, and to the bell tower of the former Evesham Abbey.

== History ==
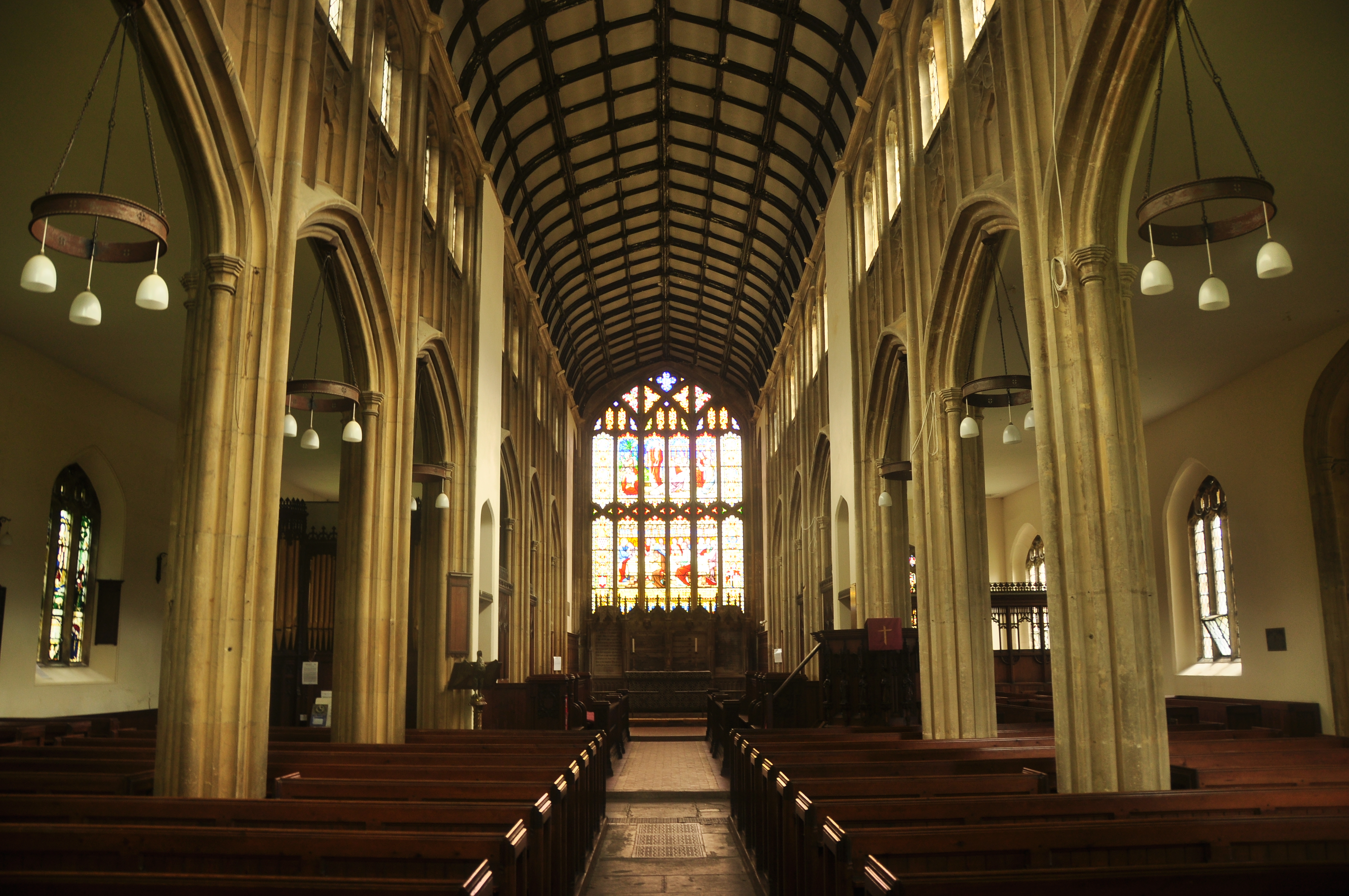
The nave of the church

St Lawrence's Church and its neighbour All Saints were built by the Benedictine monks of Evesham Abbey in the 12th century. The first documentary evidence of the church is in 1195, and it was dedicated by the Bishop of St Asaph in 1295 (probably a re-dedication following the Battle of Evesham in 1265). The church was significantly rebuilt in about 1470, replacing the earlier church. From 1659, it ceased to have its own vicar and was served by the clergy of All Saints. The fabric of the church deteriorated and by the winter of 1718 it had become unusable. Repairs started in 1737, but these were done badly, and the roof collapsed in 1800. The church was abandoned. In the early 19th century, Edward Rudge commissioned the architect Harvey Eginton, who carried out a major re-building in 1836–37. This included adding a north aisle in a similar style to the south aisle, and rebuilding the roof. During the 20th century, the size of the congregation declined. In 1978, the parish of St Lawrence united with that of All Saints, and St Lawrence's was declared redundant. It was vested in the Churches Conservation Trust the following year.

== Architecture ==
=== Exterior ===
The church is constructed in stone with slate roofs. Its plan consists of a four-bay nave with a clerestory and north and south aisles, and a two-bay chancel. The aisles are almost as wide as the nave and continue beside the chancel, with the east end of the chancel protruding beyond them to form a short sanctuary. At the west end is a tower with a porch, and there is a chapel on the south side. The tower has diagonal buttresses, and a stair turret to its southeast. On the west side is a Perpendicular doorway, over which is a large four-light window. The top stage contains two-light bell openings. At the top of the tower is a parapet with pinnacles, and it is surmounted by a short spire. The Perpendicular east window is large, with six lights, almost filling the east wall of the chancel. There are gables at the east and west ends of both aisles, which contain three-light Perpendicular windows. In the north aisle are three-light Perpendicular windows, an ogee-arched crocketted doorway, a pierced parapet, and crocketted finials. The chapel projects from the south side of the church, with diagonal buttresses, a pierced parapet, and a five-light transomed south window.

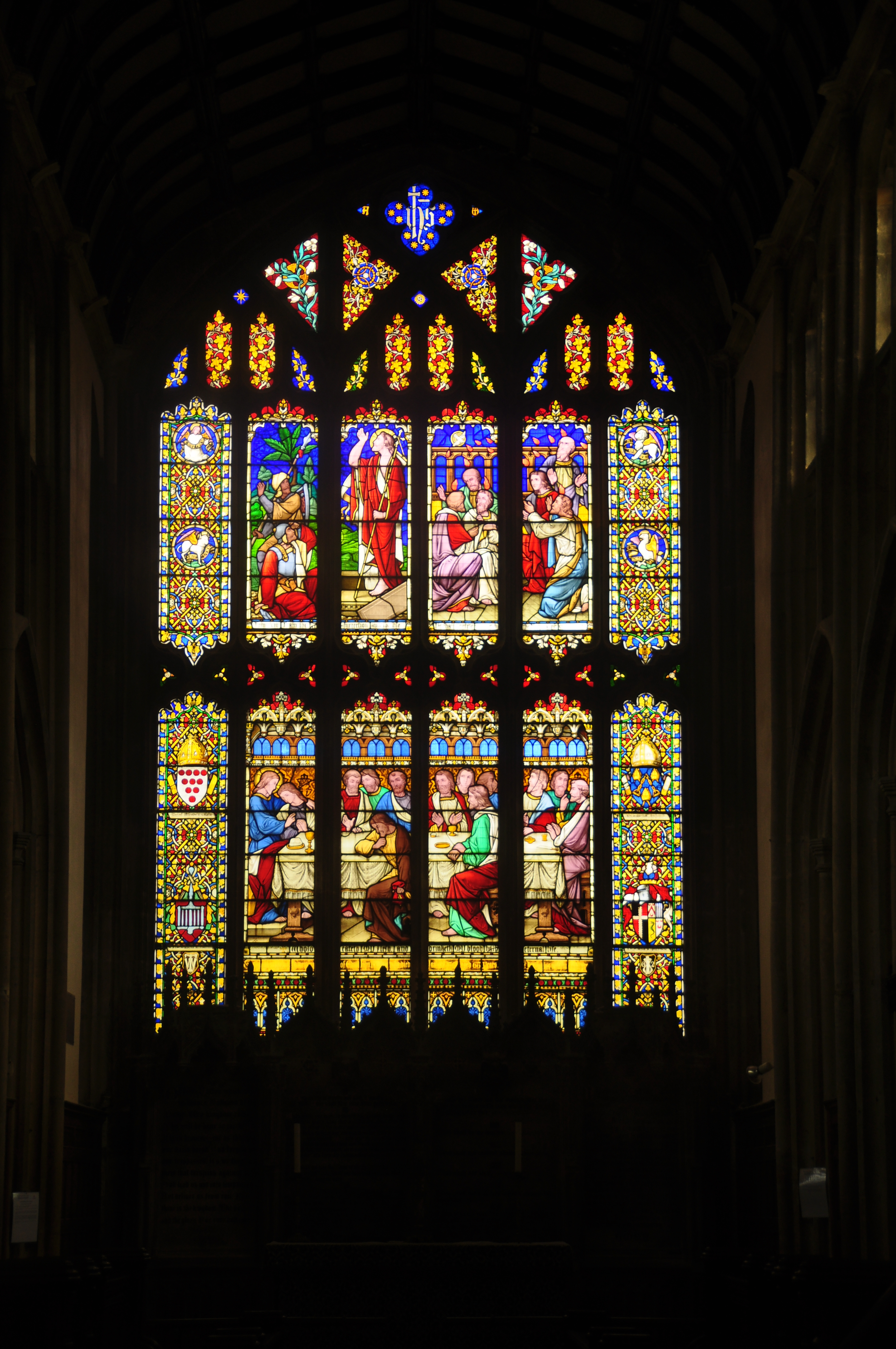
The stained glass window at the east end of the nave was created by Thomas Willement in 1862.

=== Interior ===
There is no chancel arch. Between the nave and the aisles are four-bay arcades, with Tudor-style arches carried on lozenge-shaped piers, and there is a three-bay arcade between the chancel and the chancel chapels. The stone reredos dates from 1838 and consists of canopies over inscriptions of the Creed, the Lord's Prayer and the Ten Commandments. There are carved screens between the chancel and the aisles dating from about 1900. The Jacobean communion table was donated to the church in 1610. The wooden pulpit is polygonal. It dates from 1906, and contains carved figures of the Four Evangelists, Bishop Egwin, and Saint Lawrence. The font is medieval and consists of an octagonal bowl on an octagonal stem. The south chapel has a stone fan vaulted rood and a floor of encaustic tiles. It contains a copy of the medieval font. In the east window is stained glass of 1862 by Thomas Willement, which includes depictions of the Resurrection, the Last Supper, and coats of arms. The windows in the north and south sanctuary walls are by Gibbs. The east window in the south aisle dated 1847 is by O'Connor, and the east window in the chapel is by Hardman & Co. In the north aisle are three windows from the early part of the 20th century by Geoffrey Webb, and there are other windows from later in the 20th century by Evans and Co. of Smethwick, Paul Woodroffe of Stroud, A. L. Wilkinson and Francis Skeat. The two-manual organ was made by Nicholson of Worcester in 1867.

== Notable burials ==
- Anne Rudge (1761–1836), botanical illustrator, wife of Edward Rudge
- Edward Rudge (1763–1846), botanist and antiquary

== See also ==
- List of churches preserved by the Churches Conservation Trust in the English Midlands
