= Evesham Cricket Club Ground =

Cricket ground in Evesham, Worcestershire, England

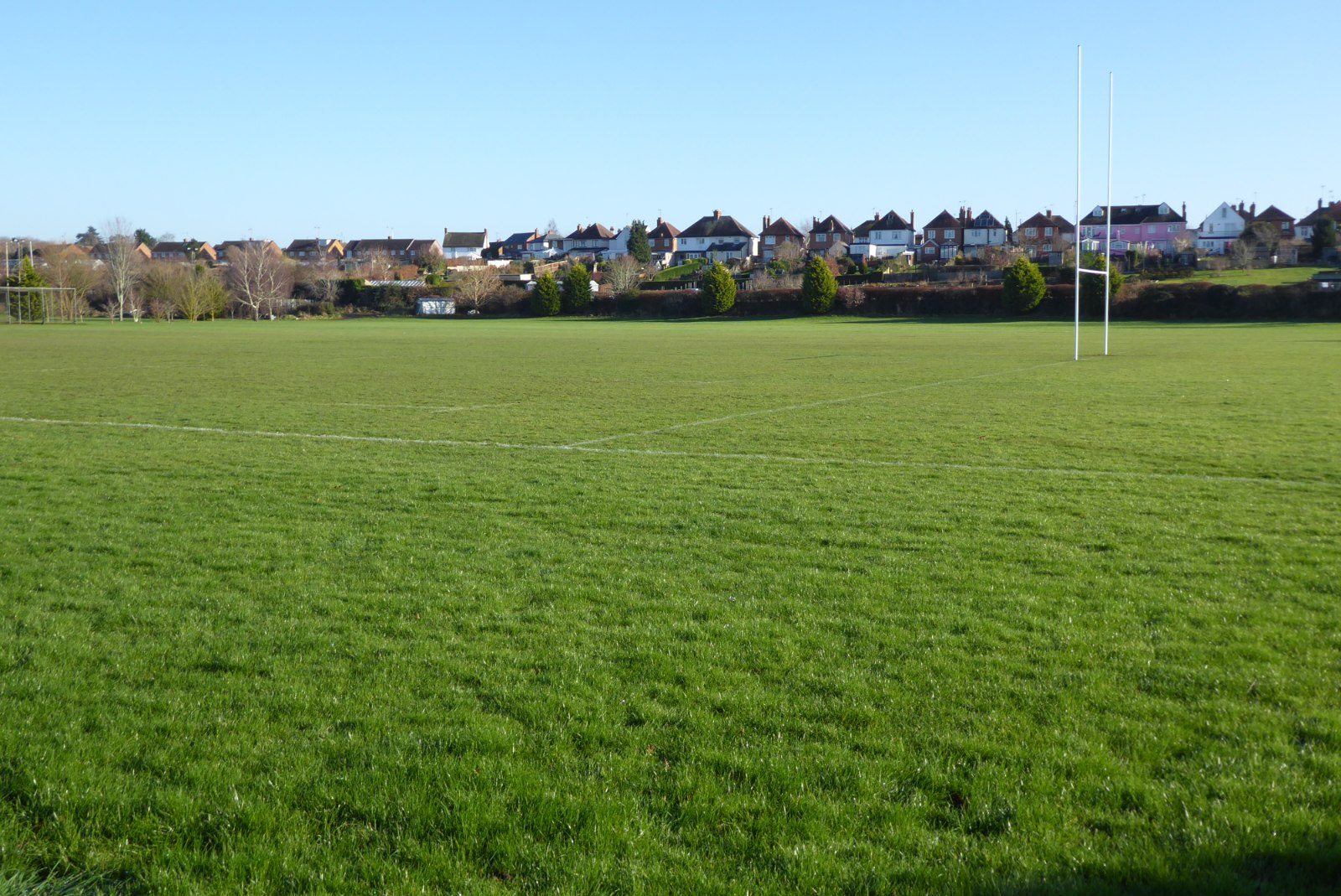
- Interactive map of Evesham Cricket Club Ground

Ground information
- Location: Evesham, Worcestershire
- Country: England
- Coordinates: 52.096°N 1.955°W
- Establishment: 1875 (first recorded match)

Team information
Worcestershire	(1951)
- As of 15 August 2025; Source: Ground profile

The Evesham Cricket Club Ground in Evesham, Worcestershire was used for first-class cricket by Worcestershire County Cricket Club on a single occasion: a County Championship match against Gloucestershire in 1951, which Worcestershire won by six wickets. Edwin Cooper made 122 for the home side, while Reg Perks took 7–65 in the first innings.

The ground was also used for two of the county's Second XI games, in 1968 and 1978.

== Bibliography ==
- Evesham Cricket Club Ground from CricketArchive. Retrieved 9 December 2006.
