= Vale of Evesham School =

Location
- Four Pools Lane; Evesham, Worcestershire,, WR11 1BN; England
- 52.0838°N 1.9386°W

Information
- Type: Special school; Academy
- Department for Education URN: 148347 Tables
- Ofsted: Reports
- Headteacher: Tina Partridge
- Gender: Coeducational
- Age: 3 to 19
- Enrolment: approx. 147
- SURN: SCO43049
- Website: https://valeofeveshamschool.org/

Vale of Evesham School in Evesham, in the county of Worcestershire, England, is a special education school for around 150 mixed gender pupils aged 3 to 19 of whom approximately 35 are in the 6th form. It caters for children with special educational needs and also accommodates 15 pupils as boarders on a weekly basis.

Pupils follow a curriculum based on National Curriculum core subjects together with activities that offer education for pupils having special moderate to severe learning difficulties that include a wide range of disabilities from autism, behavioural, emotional and social problems. The school was granted specialist status for cognition and learning and awards include Investors in People, Careers Education and Guidance Quality Mark, ArtsMark, Eco School and the Healthy School Award. The school converted to academy status in April 2013.

A December 2009 Ofsted report classed the school with a Grade 2 (good), with several points at Grade 1 (outstanding).

In November 2019 Ofsted report classed the school as Inadequate listing "serious, widespread failings in safeguarding children" finding staff members employed with criminal records unbeknown to senior leaders, students accessing and administering medication unaccompanied, and defective fire doors and lack of regular risk assessments.
