= Almonry =

Place where alms were distributed in churches

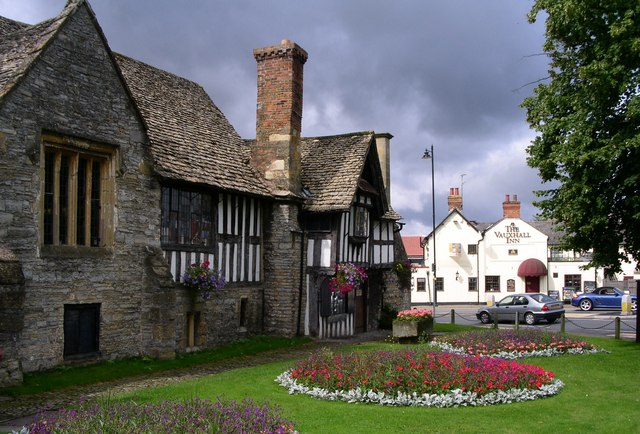
Evesham Almonry in Worcestershire

An almonry (Lat. eleemosynarium, Fr. aumônerie, Ger. Almosenhaus) is the place or chamber where alms, (money, food, or other material goods), were distributed to the poor in churches or other ecclesiastical buildings. The person designated to oversee the distribution was called an almoner.

== Examples in England ==
At Worcester Cathedral the alms are said to have been distributed on stone tables, on each side, within the great porch.

In some case, the duty to take in the poor and the sick was met by setting up an hospitium (inn) or spital (hospital) outside the gate in which about a dozen elderly or sick persons were maintained at the expense of the almoner, who had land allotted to his use from the monastery's estates. At Reading Abbey, the abbey's hospitium, or dormitory for pilgrims, known as the Hospitium of St. John was founded in 1189. The abbey school, which was founded in 1125, moved into the hospitium in 1485 as the Royal Grammar School of King Henry VII.

In large monastic establishments, as at Westminster Abbey, it seems to have been a separate building of some importance, either joining the gatehouse or near it, so that the establishment might be disturbed as little as possible. Close to the sanctuary, and adjoining its western side, was the eleemosynary or almonry, where the alms of the abbey were daily doled out to the poor and needy. The almonry was a building, analogous to our more prosaic modern alms-houses, erected by King Henry VII and his mother, the Lady Margaret, to the glory of God, for twelve poor men and poor women.

The almonry at Evesham was a separate building that was home to the almoner of the Benedictine Abbey of St. Mary and St. Ecgwine.

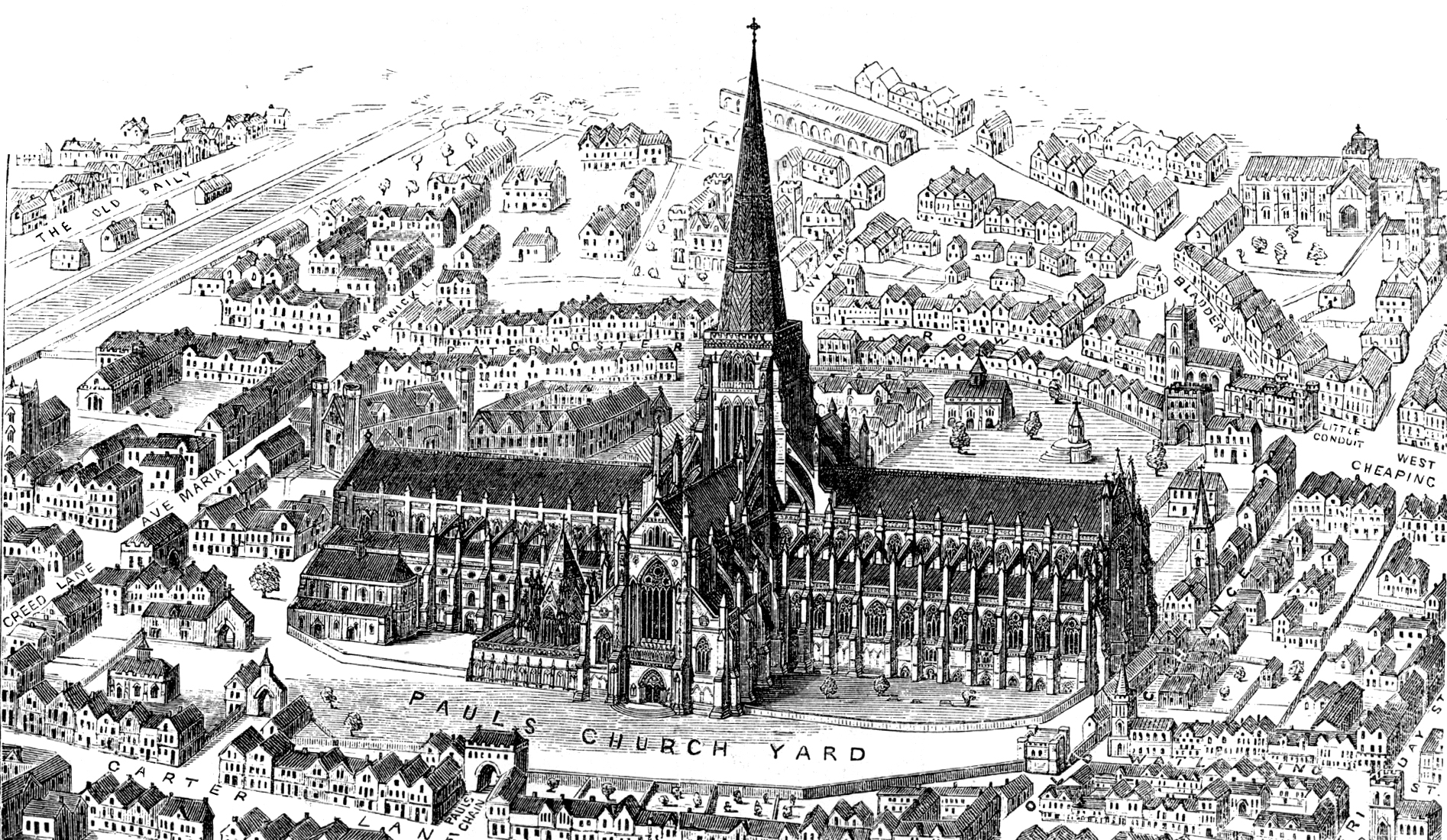
Old St Paul's Cathedral in London, with almonry left of main entrance and St. Gregory's far left

An almonry school was a medieval English monastic charity school supported by a portion of the funds allocated to the almoner. The practice began in the early 14th century when a form of scholarship was established that provided attendance at the cathedral school, housing, and food for boys at least 10 years old who could sing and read. An almonry education could prepare boys for a variety of careers, as well as university.

The almonry at Old St Paul's Cathedral in London was built along the south wall of the nave, not far from the parish church of St Gregory. The choir master was also the almoner, and the almonry housed boy choristers. It also served as a playhouse, in which the boys performed.

At the Palace of Whitehall the office of the Royal Almonry was located in Middle Scotland Yard. The Hereditary Grand Almoner, a position instituted by Richard I, distributed alms on the occasion of a coronation. The duties of the High Almoner were more general and included visiting the sick, poor widows, and prisoners and reminding the king to bestow alms, especially on saints' days. A remnant of this custom may be found in the annual Royal Maundy service.
