= Almonry Museum and Heritage Centre =

The Almonry Museum and Tourist Information Centre
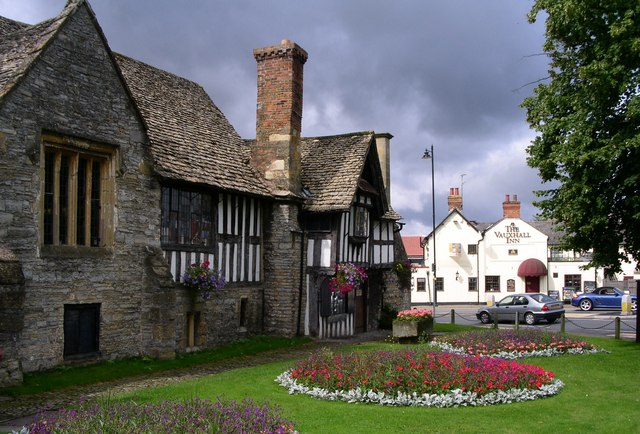
- Established: 1957
- Location: Evesham, England
- Coordinates: 52.0912°N 1.9493°W
- Website: www.almonryevesham.org

The Almonry Museum and Tourist Information Centre is a museum in Evesham in Worcestershire, England. It is also referred to as The Almonry Museum and just The Almonry. It is governed by Evesham Town Council. The focus of the museum is on the history of the town and Vale of Evesham. The museum derives its name from the original use of the building as the almonry of the 14th-century Evesham Abbey The museum opened within this building in 1957.

== History ==
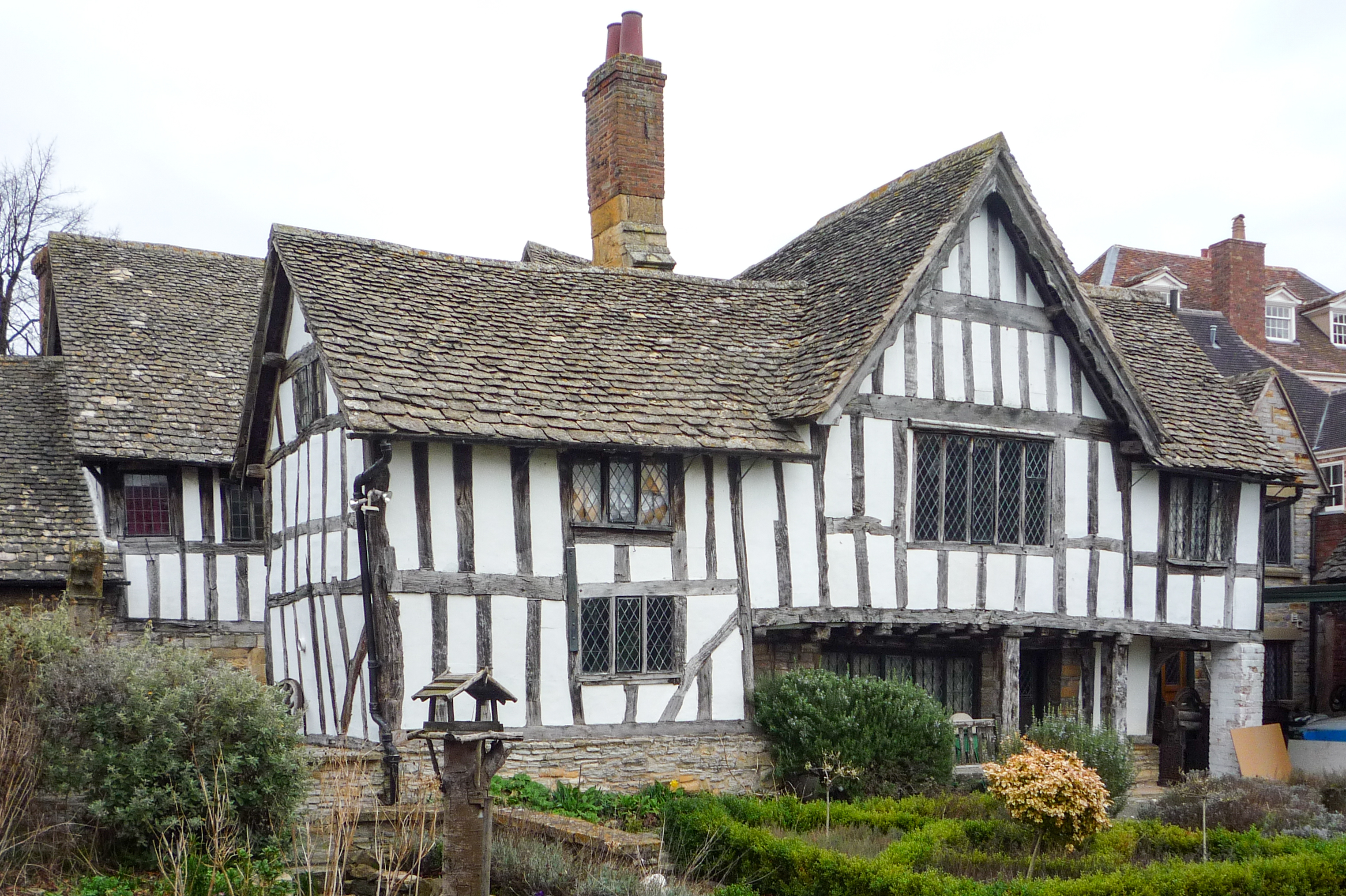
The Almonry from the rear

The Almonry Museum is housed in a 14th-century building that was formerly part of the Benedictine Evesham Abbey, the third largest abbey in England. The building is an almonry, meaning it was the home of the almoner, a monk whose role was to provide alms to the poor. Evesham Abbey was closed by Henry VIII during the Dissolution of the Monasteries, after which the Almonry became the personal home of the last Abbot, Philip Ballard. Two churches, a bell tower and a cloister arch from Evesham Abbey also survive nearby. The Almonry is a grade I listed building and was first listed in 1952. It has a part rubble and part timber-framed structure with a Cotswold stone roof. Additions to the building were made in the 15th and 17th centuries.

Following the closure of the Abbey, The Almonry has served as an ale house, offices, tea rooms and a private home. It was purchased by Evesham Borough Council in 1929 and opened as a heritage centre in 1957.

== Collections and exhibitions ==
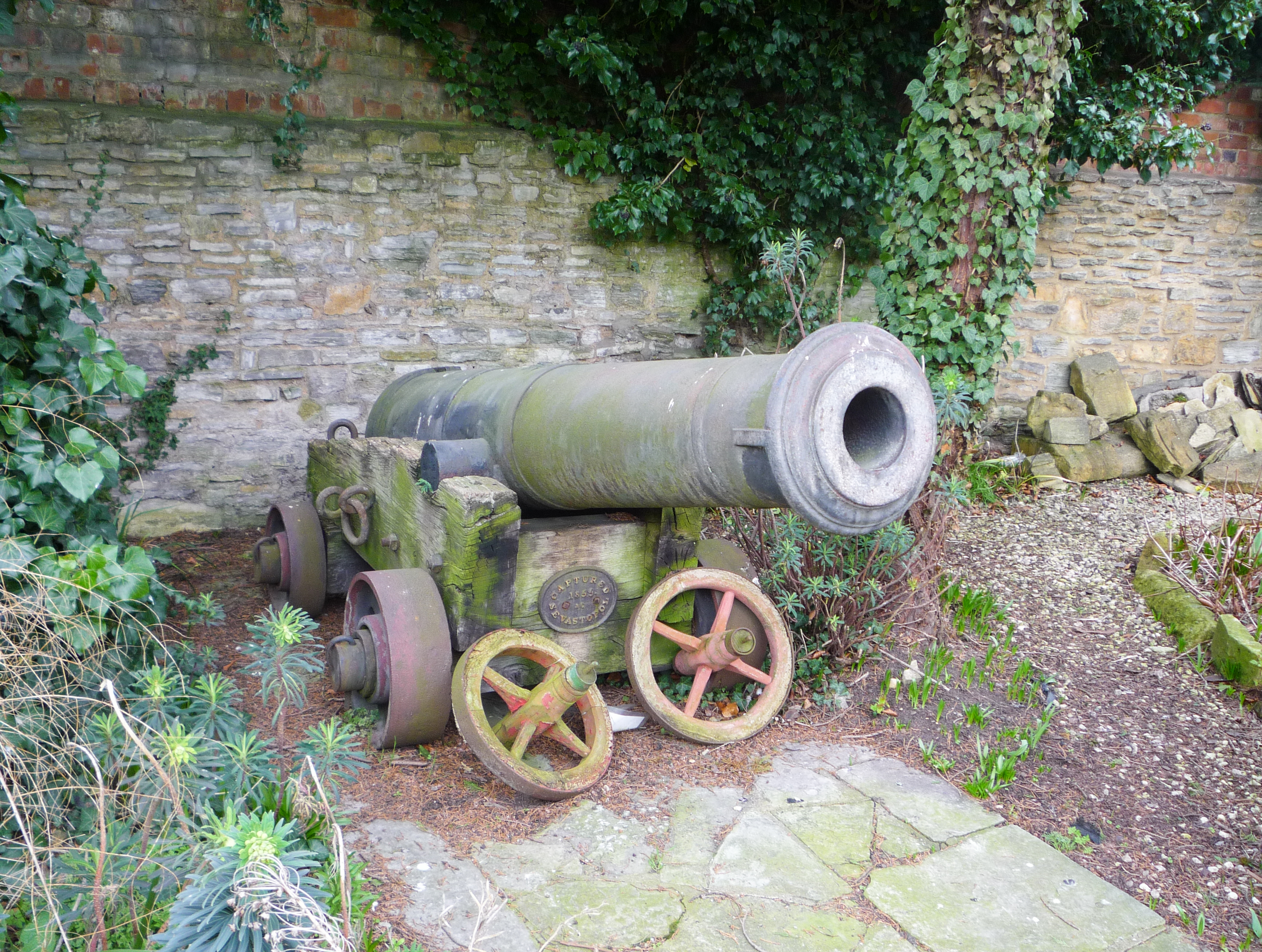
Cannon captured during the Battle of Sevastopol (Crimean War) in 1855 and later given by Queen Victoria to the town of Evesham. Now kept in the garden of the Almonry.

The museum has displays in 12 small rooms. There is a focus on the history of Evesham, with topics including Evesham Abbey, the Battle of Evesham in 1265, local agriculture, Anglo-Saxon burial treasure, 18th-century clothing and the impact of war on Evesham. The collections and displays also cover palaeontology, archaeology and history more broadly. There is also a fine art collection.

== Operations ==
The museum is owned and operated by Evesham Town Council. It shares the Almonry building with the Evesham Tourism Office. The museum is awarded Full Accreditation status by Arts Council, England.

== Future plans ==
The Great Big Almonry Project was launched in 2013 to seek funding to achieve three aims: to improve the conservation of the historic building, improve the interpretation of the exhibitions and programmes and to increase the physical accessibility of the museum In 2014 the project passed Round 1 of a Heritage Lottery Fund funding bid and was awarded £43,400 development funding towards submitting a Round 2 bid for £1,355,100.
