= Mannig =

11th-century Anglo-Saxon abbot of Evesham

- Abbot of Evesham
- Church: Evesham Abbey
- Term ended: 1058
- Predecessor: Ælfweard
- Successor: Æthelwig

Orders
- Consecration: 10 August 1044

Personal details
- Died: 6 January 1066

Mannig or Manni, also called Wulfmær, (died 6 January 1066) was an English monk and artist who became Abbot of Evesham in 1044. After suffering from paralysis, he resigned in 1058.

== Early career ==
Since he had both a Danish (Manni) and an English name (Wulfmær), Mannig is likely to have been of mixed ancestry. According to the Chronicon Abbatiae de Evesham, he was a skilled singer, writer, painter and goldsmith. He was a monk in Evesham Abbey at the time of Abbot Ælfweard. During that period, Evesham became a production centre for illuminated manuscripts under the supervision of Mannig. He also directed the making of a new shrine out of silver and gold to house the relics of Ecgwine, the founder of the abbey. The translation of the relics took place on 10 September 1040.

== Abbot ==
His election took place less than three weeks after the death of Ælfweard, a short delay which suggests he had already been designated as his successor. He was consecrated on 10 August 1044, after having been appointed by King Edward the Confessor.

Mannig remained active as an artist even after he became abbot. He produced several illuminated manuscripts and supervised the creation of shrines for the relics of Odulf and Credan. He had the abbey church rebuilt on a larger scale. The new building was consecrated on 10 October 1054 by the Bishop of Lichfield, Leofwin.

Mannig was forced to resign in 1058 after being struck with paralysis. He was succeeded by Æthelwig, who was the abbey's prior and his counsellor in matters of law and administration. He lived the rest of his days in Evesham and died on 6 January 1066.

== Citations ==
Catholic Church titles
Preceded by Ælfweard	Abbot of Evesham; 1044–1058	Succeeded by Æthelwig
