= Roger Norreis =

13th-century Anglo-Norman abbot

- Abbot of Evesham
- Church: Evesham Abbey
- Appointed: 1190
- Term ended: 1213
- Predecessor: Adam de Senlis
- Successor: Randulf

Orders
- Consecration: 1190

Personal details
- Died: between 1223 and 1225
- Buried: Penwortham Priory

Roger Norreis (Note: Sometimes known as Roger Norreys or Roger Norris.) (died between 1223 and 1225) was Abbot of Evesham in England. He was a controversial figure, installed in several offices against opposition. In his appointment to Evesham, he was accused of immoral behaviour and failing to follow monastic rules. In 1202, Norreis became embroiled in a dispute with his monks and his episcopal superior, the Bishop of Worcester; litigation and argumentation lasted until his deposition in 1213. He was then appointed prior of a subsidiary monastic house of Evesham, but was deposed within months, then re-appointed to the office five years later.

Norreis has been described by modern historians as being unsuited for the religious positions to which he was appointed and by one of being completely unsuitable to hold any kind of spiritual role. Nevertheless, even his most severe contemporary critic, Thomas of Marlborough, one of his own monks at Evesham, conceded that Norreis was energetic, entertaining, and enterprising; during his time as abbot of Evesham Abbey, he managed to complete the crossing tower of the monastic church.

Norreis died between 1223 and 1225.

== Background and early career ==
Norreis was a native of northern England and his family was probably of Norse origin. (Note: He was occasionally referred to as "from the North".) He was a monk at Christ Church Priory, the cathedral chapter of Canterbury Cathedral; when he became a monk is unknown. In 1187, he was appointed treasurer of the priory, and in that role was sent by the cathedral chapter to King Henry II of England to plead their case against Baldwin of Forde, the Archbishop of Canterbury. The archbishop and his monks were in dispute over Baldwin's plan to found a collegiate church at Hackington in honour of Thomas Becket which most of the monks opposed because they feared it would diminish the prestige of their priory.

Once Norreis reached the king, he was converted to Baldwin's side, perhaps because of the latter's appointment of Norreis as the cellarer of Christ Church while the pair were at the king's court. The monks resisted this appointment, and in September they appealed to the papacy, arguing that the appointment was against the Benedictine Rule. They also captured and held Norreis in custody, telling anyone who enquired after him that he was sick. Norreis escaped in early 1188 by travelling through the sewer and fled to the safety of the archbishop, who was then at Otford. In a mocking reference to his escape route, Norreis was occasionally known as Roger Cloacarius or "Roger the Drain-Cleaner". (Note: The monks also punned on his escape, stating that "Roger Norreis, who, since he was not necessary to us, exited, filthy, by the sewer", playing on the Latin word for sewer, necessaria.) Baldwin then tried to have Norreis installed as prior at Christ Church's dependent priory of St Martin's, Dover, but the appointment was never confirmed.

== Prior and abbot ==
King Henry died on 6 July 1189 and his son Richard I was crowned on 3 September. The succession of a new monarch eventually allowed a truce in the dispute between the Canterbury monks and their archbishop, as Henry had been a supporter of the archbishop's scheme. Before the truce could be hammered out, Baldwin appointed Norreis as prior of Christ Church in October 1189 as another move in the quarrel over the Hackington project. In November, the cathedral chapter secured a compromise that included the abandonment of the scheme and Norreis's dismissal from office. The agreement came at a council held by Richard in late November 1189 at which the monks agreed to let the king settle the dispute over the Hackington project if the archbishop would withdraw Norreis's appointment. Norreis's fellow monks considered him a traitor to their cause, and his reputation was that of someone with few morals. He was also known for ingratiating himself with those in power, including the justiciar Geoffrey fitzPeter. Many of the details concerning Norreis's career at Christ Church come from the works of Gervase of Canterbury, as well as the collection of letters known as the Epistolae Cantuarienses.

Norreis was appointed to the abbacy of Evesham Abbey in 1190 and was blessed as abbot on 13 January 1190. He owed his appointment to King Richard and to Baldwin's attempts to make the dismissal from Christ Church look less like a defeat for the archbishop. Norreis also claimed that he received the office in return for unspecified services he rendered to Richard. There was no attempt at an election by the monks, a lack which went against canon law. During his tenure of office, his monks accused him of fornication, excessive drinking, gluttony, setting up favourites, starving the monks, and appropriating monastic property for his own use. A further offence was his habit of wearing secular clothing rather than the monastic habit prescribed by the Benedictine Rule. All these charges come from one of his monks, the historian Thomas of Marlborough, who wrote much of the history of Evesham known as the Chronicon Abbatiae de Evesham. Thomas's account of Norreis's rule is biased against the abbot and is a self-aggrandising account of how Thomas single-handedly triumphed over both his and his abbey's foes. Norreis did manage some good for the abbey, as it was while he was abbot that the crossing tower of the monastic church was completed.

Early in his tenure, Norreis appears to have been somewhat circumspect and did not greatly annoy his monks. The change appears to have happened around 1195, when the monks are first recorded as appealing to a higher authority. Because Evesham had traditionally claimed to be exempt from episcopal oversight by the see of Worcester, in which it was located, the monks could only appeal to the papacy or to a papal legate. Hubert Walter, the Archbishop of Canterbury after Baldwin, held a legateship for England until July 1195, and so the monks appealed to him. Walter forced Norreis to make some compromises with his subordinates, but the truce did not last long, and the monks once again complained of their treatment. They were visited by the new Bishop of Worcester John of Coutances some time between 1196 and 1198, but Norreis succeeded in avoiding any severe sanctions by offering gifts to the bishop. The monks again appealed to Walter in about 1200, but between the archbishop's preoccupation with political affairs and Norreis's promises to reform, no solid changes occurred.

== Dispute with Mauger and his monks ==
In 1202, the new Bishop of Worcester Mauger attempted to investigate Norreis's conduct, but under the leadership of Thomas of Marlborough the monastic community refused to allow the bishop to visit, claiming that Evesham was exempt from episcopal visitation and oversight. According to Thomas, Norreis offered to renounce the abbey's claim to exemption in return for money, but the bishop refused. Norreis then fled the monastery, while the monks continued to refuse the bishop and were excommunicated, a sentence that Norreis was spared. Between early September and mid-October the dispute was heard by three ecclesiastical tribunals; Mauger was supported by Eustace, Bishop of Ely, and Giles de Braose, Bishop of Hereford. The monks and Norreis then made common cause, each vowing to stand by the other in resisting Mauger. As well as these two cases, there was a dispute between the monks and the bishop over the ownership of some properties. The monks and Norreis then obtained the right for their case to be heard by papal judge-delegates, but Mauger objected to the fact that the appointed judges were all Benedictine monks, (Note: They were abbots of Malmesbury Abbey, Abingdon Abbey, and Eynsham Abbey.) and travelled to Rome to appeal.

In 1203, Norreis, secure in his alliance with his own monks, once again began to exploit the monastery for his own profit and that of his family and friends. His monks became upset at this renewal of their exploitation and sent Thomas, along with other monks, to appropriate the harvest from some lands that had been given by Norreis to a non-member of the community. Norreis protested to King John and to Hubert Walter. Both the king and Walter summoned Thomas to appear before them separately and explain the actions of the monks. Thomas failed to persuade either man, and nothing was done about Norreis's exactions and abuse of his monks.

Norreis went to Rome in the company of Thomas of Marlborough shortly before 1205 to lay the abbey's case before the papacy. Thomas remained in Italy, but Norreis returned to England in the middle of 1205. While in Rome, Norreis and Thomas borrowed 400 marks to finance the litigation at the papal curia. (Note: 100 livres of silver went to the pope and a further 100 livres to the cardinals.) Norreis could not repay this sum and, for a while, was in danger of being imprisoned, but he managed to leave Rome without suffering the fate of one of his companions who was detained for the debt and died while imprisoned. When Norreis made it back to England, Mauger excommunicated the abbot in April 1205. The monks won a victory on the question of the abbey's exemption from episcopal visitation in 1206, but other elements of the quarrel remained unresolved, including that of the disputed churches. Later that year the monks became so annoyed by Norreis's abuse that they abandoned the abbey and did not return until they secured the abbot's confirmation of their rights.

With the question of the episcopal exemption decided in Evesham's favour, the alliance between Norreis and his monks dissolved. The monks again complained of their abbot's behaviour to the new papal legate, John of Sancta Maria. The legate ordered an investigation, the result being a written agreement between the two parties. Norreis gave gifts to the legate's nephew, refused to sign the agreement, and took revenge on his opponents by expelling Thomas of Marlborough and his allies from the monastery. Thirty monks followed Thomas into exile, and Norreis pursued them with soldiers who were defeated by the monks. A compromise was eventually reached, Norreis agreeing that the revenues of the abbey would be split with the monks, that officials of the abbey would be appointed by the abbot but with the advice and consent of the monks, and that the abbot would not admit or expel monks without taking the counsel of his monks nor dispose of the monastic property without the consent of his subordinates. (Note: This compromise was eventually confirmed by Pope Innocent III in 1216.) Although the issue of the monks' support was temporarily solved, the issue of the disputed properties between Mauger and the monastery continued. Norreis appears to have been willing to compromise with the bishop, but the monks refused. (Note: The case of the properties went into abeyance for several years and was not finally decided until 1248.)

The dispute between Norreis and his monks dragged on for years. The interdict of 1207–1213 caused further delays, but when it was lifted in 1213, the case against Norreis was finally heard. A papal legate visited the abbey and found that the monks were lacking in food, (Note: The monks chose to deprive themselves of food so that their servants might be fed, stating in the Chronicon that "without them [the servants] we cannot live".) clothes, and other necessities. The liturgy was not being performed according to the monastic rule because the monks lacked the proper clothing. Charity to the poor had ceased, the monastic buildings were dilapidated, and the monks were forced to beg for their needs. The legate found that the abbot was living well, wearing non-monastic clothes, and enjoying the company of young women in his dwelling, while his monks suffered. Norreis was deposed from the abbacy by the papal legate in 1213.

== Later life and death ==
On 27 November 1213, Norreis was appointed the prior of Penwortham Priory, a dependent priory of Evesham, partly to compensate him for the loss of the abbacy and partly to keep him from abandoning monastic life entirely. Norreis was deposed five months later owing to his continued bad morals and behaviour and again went to Rome in a bid to be restored to office. On this occasion, he was unable to secure his reinstatement, but in 1218 or 1219, he was restored to Penwortham through the influence of the papal legate Pandulf Verraccio. Norreis died on 16 July or 19 July, but there is disagreement over the year of his death. The Oxford Dictionary of National Biography states that he died in 1223, but the editors of Heads of Religious Houses: England and Wales, 940–1216 state he died in either 1224 or 1225. He was buried at Penwortham.

Thomas of Marlborough, who knew Norreis, wrote that he was "everywhere condemned as the manifest enemy of God". More modern writers echo the sentiment. John Moorman described Norreis as a man "totally unsuited to the delicate and responsible task of ruling over a company of men and directing the affairs of a wealthy corporation". David Knowles, a historian of English monasticism, wrote that Norreis was "utterly unworthy to hold spiritual office of any kind", and that Baldwin's appointment of him as prior at Christ Church "must always remain a dark stain on the archbishop's reputation". Knowles also noted that he was "a man of great practical ability". Even Thomas of Marlborough noted that Norreis was energetic, entertaining, and full of enterprise.

== Citations ==
Catholic Church titles
Preceded by Adam de Senlis	Abbot of Evesham; 1190–1213	Succeeded by Randulf
