= Odulf =

Saint Odulf
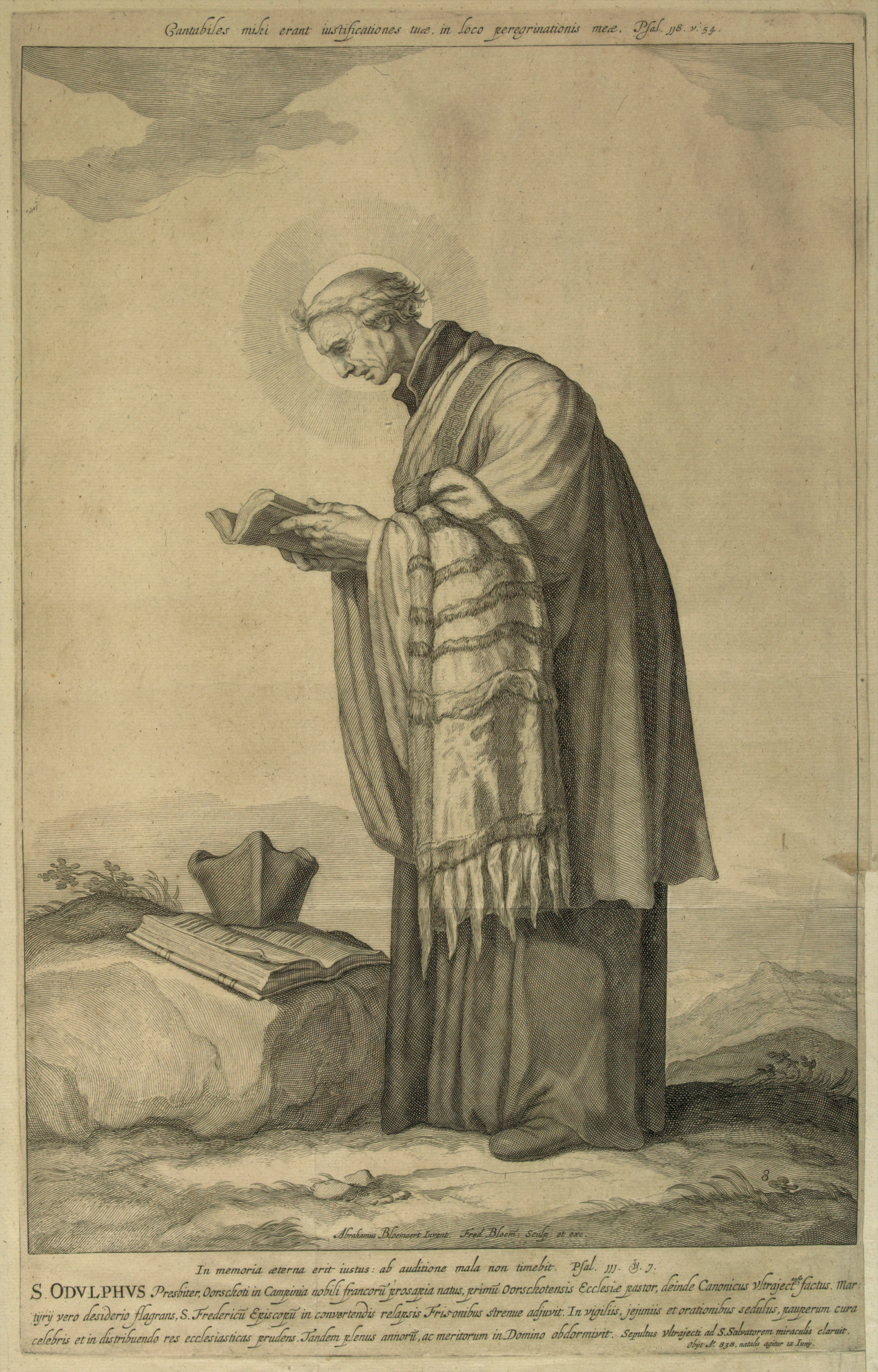
- Odulf

Missionary
- Born: Brabant
- Died: c. 855
- Canonized: Pre-congregation
- Feast: 12 June (or 18 July on some calendars)

Odwulf of Evesham (or Odulf, Odulph, Odulfo, Odulphus; died 855) was a ninth century saint, monk and Frisian missionary.

== Lives ==
Odwulf is recorded in the medieval Secgan hagiography the Medieval Hagiography of Saint Ecgwine (Note: On St. Odulf see ‘The Medieval Hagiography of Saint Ecgwine’, p.79 & p.83. This notes that Abbot Ælfweard occupied himself with increasing Evesham’s prestige, and purchased the relics of Saint Odulf.) and the Ave presul glorioseI Augustine psalter, where he is linked with Oda of Canterbury, hagiography of St Odulf, and Chronicon Abbatiae de Evesham

Odwuld died in 855 AD. He is buried in Evesham, with Saints Ecgwine and Wigstan.

== Monks of Ramsgate account ==
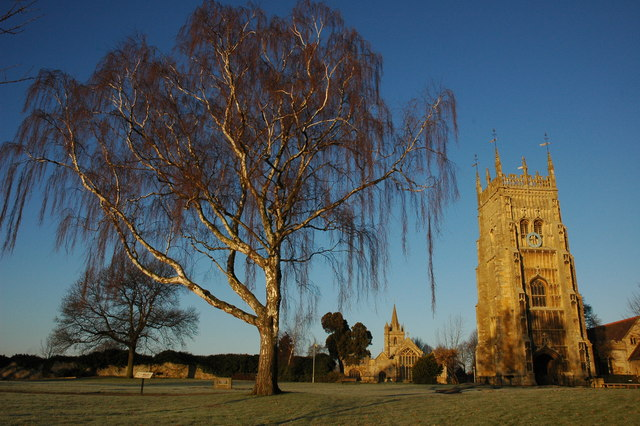
Evesham Abbey

The monks of St Augustine's Abbey, Ramsgate wrote in their Book of Saints (1921),

Odulph (St.) (12 June)
(9th cent.) A native of Brabant who, after a long and fruitful missionary life in the first half of the ninth century, passed away at Utrecht in Holland. His relics were translated to Evesham Abbey (A.D. 1034), to which the fame of the many miracles wrought by the intercession of the Saint drew numerous pilgrims.

== Butler's account ==
The hagiographer Alban Butler (1710–1773) wrote in his Lives of the Fathers, Martyrs, and Other Principal Saints under July 18,

St. Odulph, Canon of Utrecht, C.

HE was born of noble French parents, and distinguished in his youth by the innocence of his manners, and his remarkable progress in learning and piety. Being ordained priest, he was made curate of Oresscoth in Brabant. St. Frederic afterwards, by urgent entreaties, engaged him, for the greater glory of God, to be his strenuous assistant in reforming the manners of the fierce Frisons; in which undertaking it is incredible what fatigues he underwent, and what proofs he gave of heroic patience, meekness, zeal, and charity. Contemplation and prayer were the support and refreshment of his soul under his continual labours and austerities. Several wonderful predictions of things which happened long after his death, are recorded in his life.

In his old age he resided at Utrecht, and died canon of the cathedral. To his last moments he allowed himself no indulgence, and never relaxed his fervour in labour; but rather redoubled his pace the nearer he saw his end approach, knowing this to be the condition of the Christian’s hire, and fearing to lose by sloth and for want of perseverance the crown for which he fought. His fasts, his watchings, his assiduity in prayer, his almsdeeds, his zeal in instructing the people, and exhorting all men to the divine love and the contempt of all earthly things, seemed to gather strength with his years. Being seized with a fever, he with joy foretold his last moment, and earnestly exhorting his brethren to fervour, and commending himself to their prayers, he promised, by the divine mercy, never to forget them before God, and happily departed this life in the ninth age, on the 12th of June, on which day his festival was kept with great solemnity at Utrecht and Staveren.

Several churches and chapels bear his name; but the chapel at the New Bridge in Amsterdam, called Olofs-Kapel, was erected by the Danish sailors in memory of St. Olaus, king of Norway and Martyr, not of St. Odulph, as the Bollandists and some others have mistook. See the life of St. Odulph in the Bollandists, Junij, t. 2, and Batavia Sacra, p. 106.

== Sources ==
- Butler, Alban (1799), The Lives of the Primitive Fathers, Martyrs, and Other Principal Saints, J. Moir This article incorporates text from this source, which is in the public domain.
- Hornby, Emma; Maw, David Nicholas, eds. (2010), Essays on the History of English Music in Honour of John Caldwell, Boydell & Brewer, ISBN 9781843835356
- St. Augustine's Abbey, Ramsgate (1921), The Book of saints : a dictionary of servants of God canonized by the Catholic Church, London: A. & C. Black, ltd. This article incorporates text from this source, which is in the public domain.
