= Geoffrey Webb (artist) =

English stained-glass artist and designer

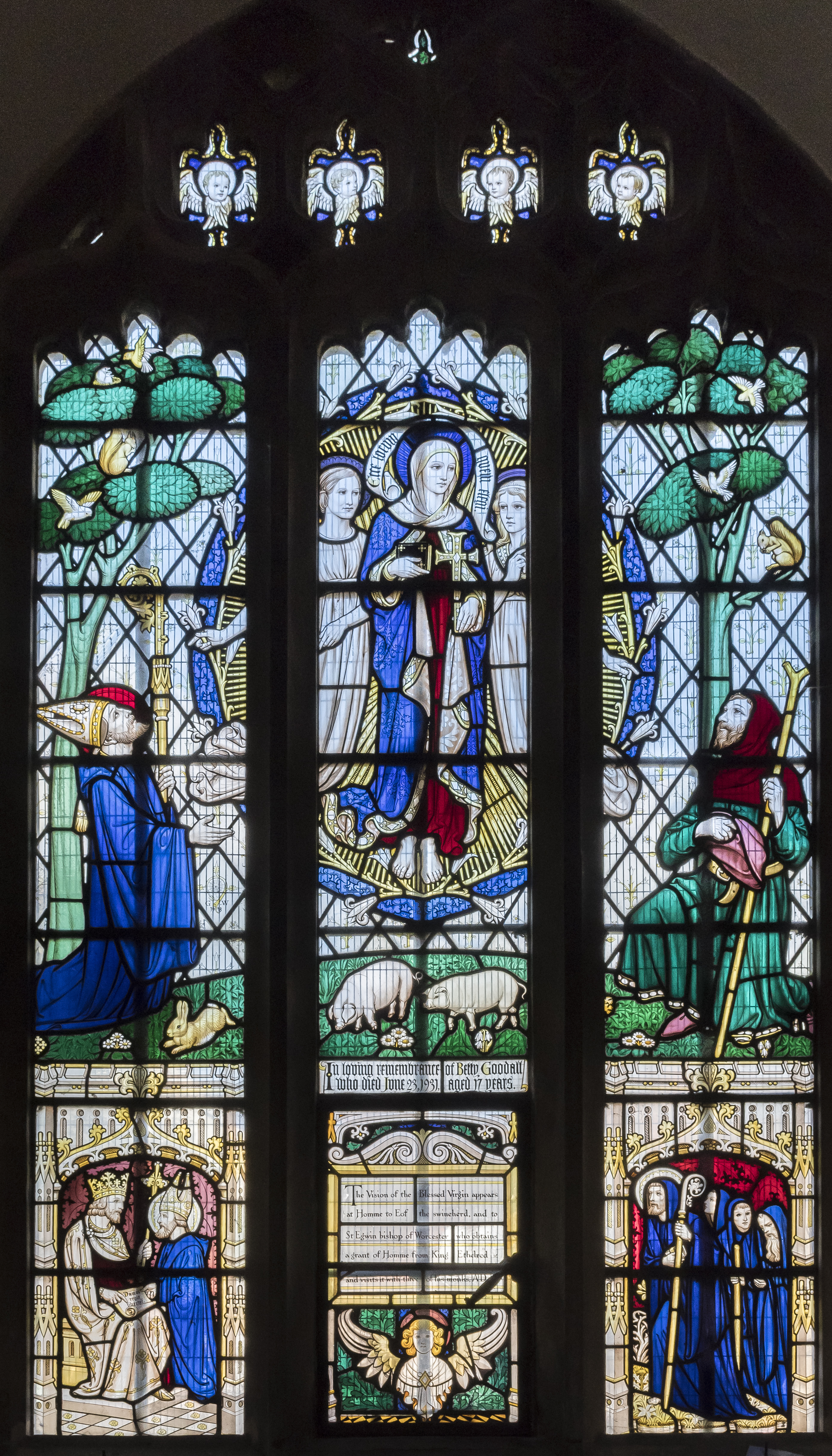
The Egwin and Eof window in St Lawrence's Church, Evesham, Worcestershire

Geoffrey Fuller Webb (5 August 1879 – 20 January 1954) was an English stained-glass artist and designer of church furnishings, based for most of his career in East Grinstead. He was a nephew of the architect Sir Aston Webb and a pupil of Charles Eamer Kempe and Sir Ninian Comper. His work, which draws on the Gothic Revival tradition, can be found in both Church of England and Roman Catholic churches, and in several cathedrals. It can be identified by his artistic signature, a spider's web.

== Ancestry and childhood ==
Geoffrey Webb was born into an artistic family of some note. His grandfather, Edward Webb, was a painter and printmaker; his uncles included Sir Aston Webb, the eminent architect; and his father, Edward Alfred Webb, was a watercolourist and antiquary who wrote a history of the Priory Church of St Bartholomew the Great in two volumes. He was born at Salisbury House, Turnham Green, London in 1879, and educated at St Germans Place School in Kidbrooke, Rugby School, and the Westminster School of Art. Webb studied stained-glass design under Charles Eamer Kempe, then considered the country's leading practitioner, and, like his brother Christopher Webb, under Ninian Comper.

== Career ==
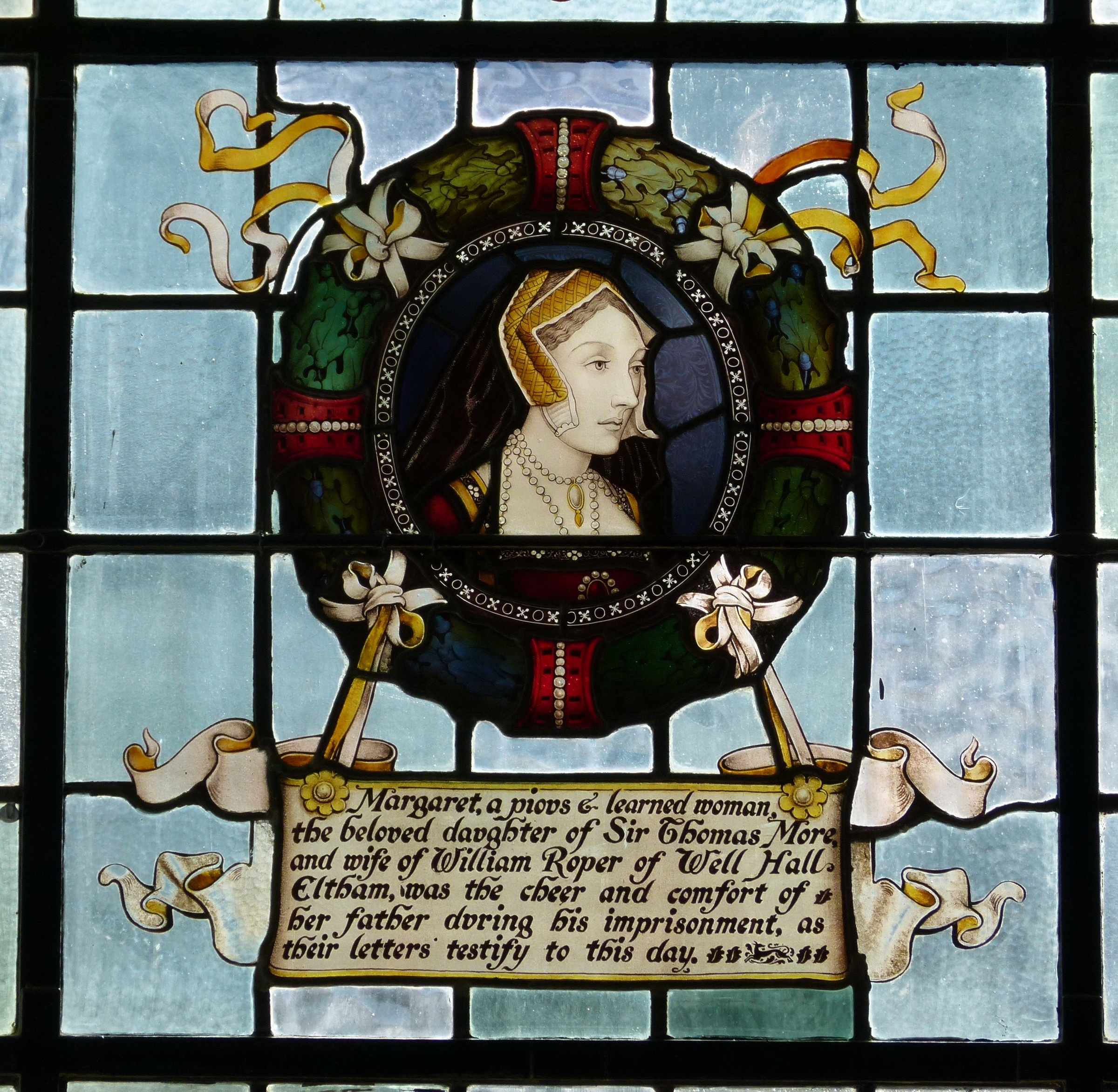
The Margaret More window in Woolwich Town Hall, London

Going into business, he worked briefly with Herbert Bryans and Ernest Heasman, perhaps in partnership, before striking out on his own. One of his earliest commissions was for Woolwich Town Hall's stained glass; this he designed in late 1904. In 1919 he moved to Sackville House, on the High Street of East Grinstead in Sussex, and established a workshop at Brooker's Yard in West Street. Here he not only designed stained glass but also restored old glass and designed church furniture and metalwork. Webb took an active part in the life of East Grinstead, co-founding its Civic League and joining its repertory company, for which he painted theatre posters. In 1933 he drew on his artistic experience and his extensive knowledge of liturgical matters to write The Liturgical Altar, a treatise on the legal and aesthetic aspects of altar design. This is considered the standard book on its subject, and it had a highly beneficial effect on Webb's career, making his name known to a large number of potential clients. Webb accepted commissions from both Anglican and Roman Catholic churches. Some of the more high-profile ones came from Brompton Oratory, Tewkesbury Abbey, Canterbury Cathedral, Manchester Cathedral, Worcester Cathedral, and Llandaff Cathedral. He also carried his reputation abroad with stained-glass windows in St Alban's Church, Copenhagen, and in two South African cathedrals, those of Johannesburg and George. He was still actively engaged in stained-glass design at the time of his death in 1954.

== Style ==
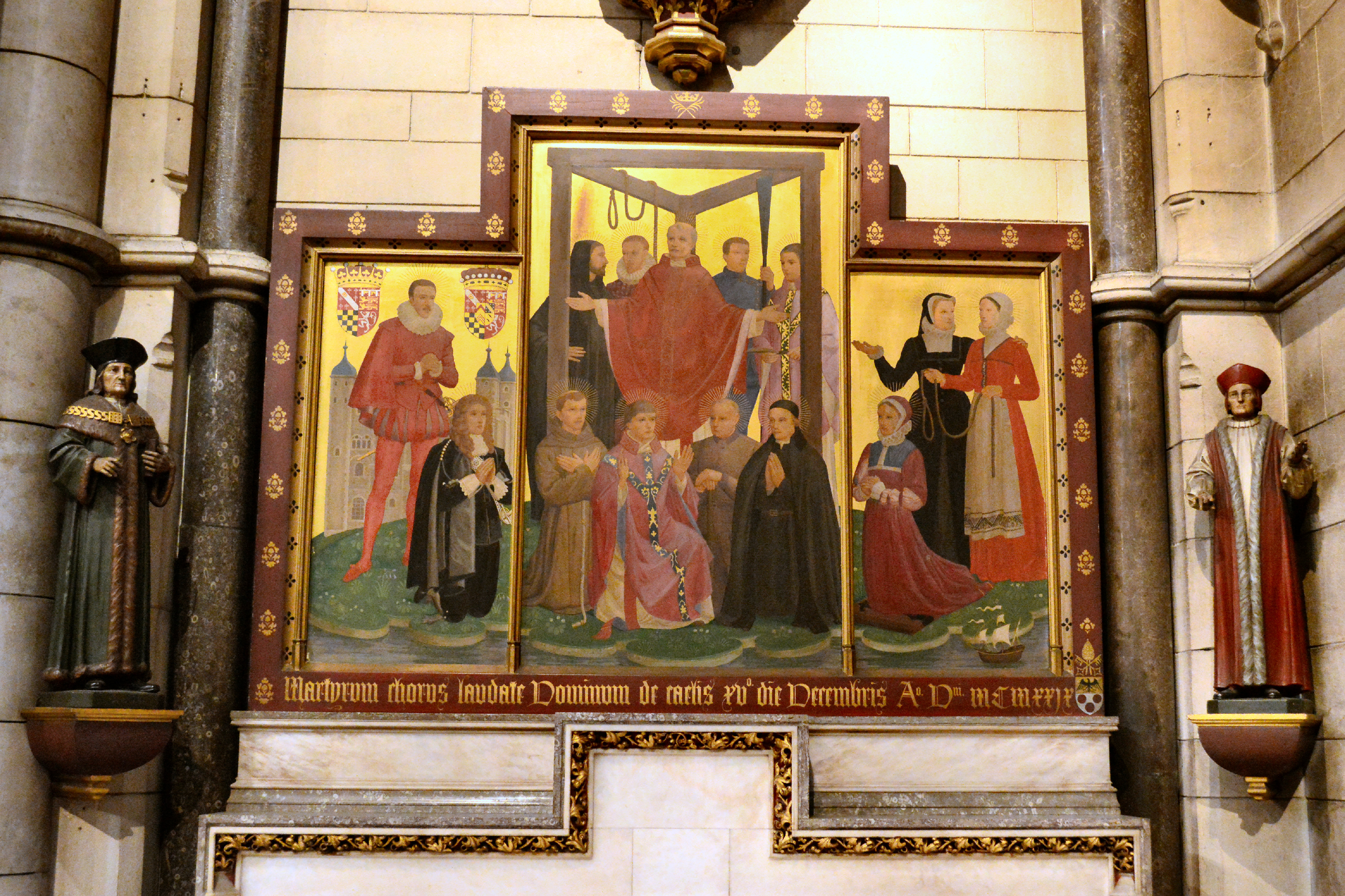
Reredos in St James's Church, Marylebone, London

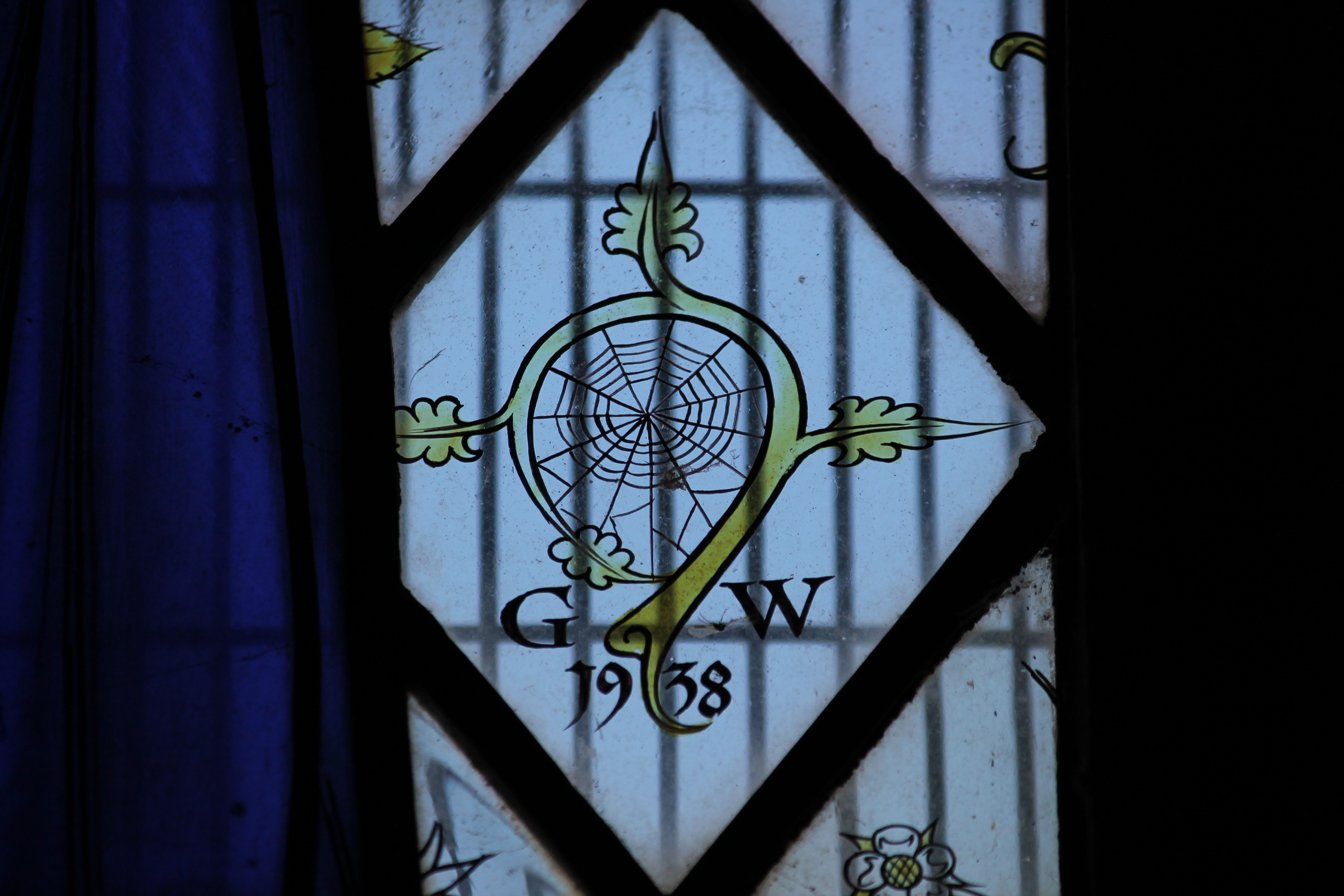
Spider's web signature

Webb was a pupil of Charles Eamer Kempe and Ninian Comper, both artists associated with the Gothic Revival, but he was much more influenced by the latter than by the former, bringing a new freshness of colour and line to the Gothic tradition. He was praised for the beautiful detail in his drawing and for his fine sense of colour. His brilliant blues are especially characteristic, as is his readiness to use a good deal of white glass, which he justified with the statement that "the first function of a window is to admit light". He often chose heraldic subjects, and he was careful to bring his designs into harmony with the surrounding architecture. His views on liturgical art were always in close conformity with the dictates of the canon law of the Catholic Church, which lays it down that "in regard to the material and form of sacred furniture it is necessary to keep to liturgical prescriptions, ecclesiastical traditions, and to the greatest extent possible to the laws of sacred art". Webb's artistic signature, a spider's web, can usually be found near the bottom right-hand corner of his windows.

== Personal life ==
Geoffrey Webb married Joan Hanbury on 10 May 1906, and they had three sons and one daughter. Though Webb came from a High Church Anglican background, he and his wife converted to Catholicism in 1913, and Catholic doctrine became an important influence on his life and thought. In 1929 he helped to form the Company of Saint Joseph, a body of Catholic artists reportedly devoted to "the regular study of liturgical rules, rubrics, and decrees", and he gave lectures in their support.
