= EOF =

EOF or Eof may refer to:

== Science and technology ==
- Electro-osmotic flow, the motion of liquid induced by an applied potential
- Empirical orthogonal functions, in statistics and signal processing
- Ethyl orthoformate, an organic compound

=== Computing ===
- End-of-file, a condition where no more data can be read from a data source
- End of frame of an Ethernet transmission
- Enterprise Objects Framework, a NeXT object-relational mapping product
- EoF, a song editing program for the free Guitar Hero clone Frets on Fire

== Other uses ==
- Eof (about 701), a swineherd who claimed to have seen a vision of the Virgin Mary in England
- End of Fashion, an Australian band
- Original French-language production (EOF), an audiovisual work eligible for broadcasting and investment quotas in France
