= Æthelwig =

11th-century Anglo-Saxon abbot of Evesham

- Abbot of Evesham
- Church: Evesham Abbey
- Term ended: 16 February either 1077 or 1078
- Predecessor: Mannig
- Successor: Walter

Orders
- Consecration: 1058

Personal details
- Born: c. 1013
- Died: 16 February either 1077 or 1078

Æthelwig (c. 1013–16 February in either 1077 or 1078) was an Abbot of Evesham before and during the Norman Conquest of England. Born sometime around 1010 or 1015, he was elected abbot in 1058. Known for his legal expertise, he administered estates for Ealdred, the Bishop of Worcester prior to his election as abbot. After his election, he appears to have acted as Ealdred's deputy, and was considered as a possible successor when Ealdred was elected Archbishop of York. Æthelwig worked during his abbacy to recover estates that had been lost to Evesham, as well as acquiring more estates.

After the Norman Conquest, in 1066, Æthelwig was one of the few Englishmen trusted by the new King William the Conqueror, and was given authority over parts of western England. As part of his duties, he was a royal judge and held important prisoners. During the Harrying of the North in 1069–1070, Æthelwig gave aid to refugees from the north of England. He also helped the king in the rebellion of 1075, preventing one of the rebels from joining the others. Æthelwig died on 16 February in either 1077 or 1078, and was memorialised in a work on his life that was later incorporated in the Chronicon Abbatiae de Evesham, a 13th-century history of the abbey and its abbots.

== Early life and election as abbot ==
Æthelwig was probably born about 1010 to 1015, and inherited a large amount of land from his family. He served as an administrator of the estates of Ealdred, the Bishop of Worcester, as well as those of Evesham Abbey. Æthelwig was also known as a legal expert. He was elected abbot in 1058, and was blessed on 23 April 1058, by Ealdred, who was the diocesan bishop for Evesham. He replaced the previous abbot, Mannig, who had become paralysed. One story has it that Ealdred asked King Edward the Confessor to give the abbacy to Æthelwig, another, in the Chronicon de Abbatiae Evesham, a history of Evesham Abbey, states that it was Mannig who asked the king to make the appointment. The Chronicon also states that the blessing took place at Gloucester, and that Ealdred was Archbishop at the time, although Ealdred did not become Archbishop of York until 1060.

During Æthelwig's abbacy, he appears to have acted as the deputy for Ealdred, as bishop of Worcester. In 1062, he was one of the candidates to succeed Ealdred as bishop, when Ealdred was promoted to Archbishop of York, but Wulfstan was chosen instead. Æthelwig also served as a judge for King Edward the Confessor, at one point hearing a case at the royal court along with Wulfstan and Regenbald, the chancellor. The abbot also led military forces in battle, and served King Edward as an advisor.

Æthelwig's relationship with Wulfstan, when Wulfstan was acting as the abbot's diocesan bishop, appears to have been tense, for on the only recorded visitation by Wulfstan to Evesham during Æthelwig's abbacy, Æthelwig was not there. Although in legal matters Wulfstan and Æthelwig were in conflict, personally, Æthelwig is said to have regarded Wulfstan as a father figure, and as the abbot's confessor. The fact that the Evesham's house chronicle appears to have been reworked after 1100 to gloss over embarrassing incidents of the abbots submitting to the bishops of Worcester makes evaluation of Æthelwig's relations with his episcopal superiors more difficult.

During Edward's reign, Æthelwig worked to recover some of the abbey's estates that had been granted to others in the past but had not been returned to the abbey's custody. He managed to restore the abbey's possession of a number of these lost estates. A large section of the description of the abbot's life in the Chronicon is concerned with a listing of estates that Æthelwig acquired or recovered. The estates listed were in the counties of Worcestershire, Warwickshire, and Gloucestershire.

== After the Conquest ==
After the Norman Conquest, Æthelwig was trusted by the new king, William the Conqueror, and given some administrative duties. Æthelwig was one of a very small number of native Englishmen trusted by the king, which group included Ealdred and Wulfstan. Probably in 1069, Æthelwig was given authority in the former lands of the Mercian kingdom. After the deposition of Godric, the abbot of Winchcombe Abbey in 1070, Æthelwig served as his jailor. In 1072, Æthelwig was acting as a royal judge in the western part of England. During the rebellion of 1075, Æthelwig kept Roger de Breteuil, the Earl of Hereford, one of the rebels, from joining up with the other rebels. In this action, Æthelwig was assisted by Wulfstan, as well as the sheriff of Worcestershire, Urse d'Abetot. Æthelwig also took the opportunity after the Norman Conquest to acquire more lands, obtaining 36 estates by redeeming loans. Æthelwig used his knowledge of English law not only on his own account, but to aid the new Norman ecclesiastics, such as Lanfranc, the Archbishop of Canterbury, and Serlo, the Abbot of Gloucester. A number of English landowners commended themselves into Æthelwig's care after the Conquest, and this led to conflicts over who owned the lands after Æthelwig's death.

Although Æthelwig was known for his loyalty to King William, he had an uncle who held land at Witton who died fighting for King Harold Godwinson, probably at the Battle of Stamford Bridge. While abbot, even after the Conquest, Æthelwig continued to build and ornament his abbey in the Anglo-Saxon style, not the Norman Romanesque which was being used in many of the other churches and abbeys. Besides his administrative and legal duties, Æthelwig was known for his care for the sick and the poor, as well as lepers. After the Harrying of the North by King William in 1069–1070, Æthelwig offered shelter to refugees from the ravaged areas. The Chronicon states that Æthelwig offered aid to the refugees because of his charitable nature, but it is possible that it was also part of his royal duties in western England.

Æthelwig also administered Winchcombe Abbey for a number of years, at first from 1066 to 1069 when a Norman monk was appointed abbot, and then again from 1075 until Æthelwig's death. Hemming, a medieval monastic writer from Worcester Priory, wrote of Æthelwig that he "surpassed everyone by his intelligence, his shrewdness and his knowledge of worldly law". The Chronicon reports that Æthelwig suffered from gout, and states that it was the cause of his death.

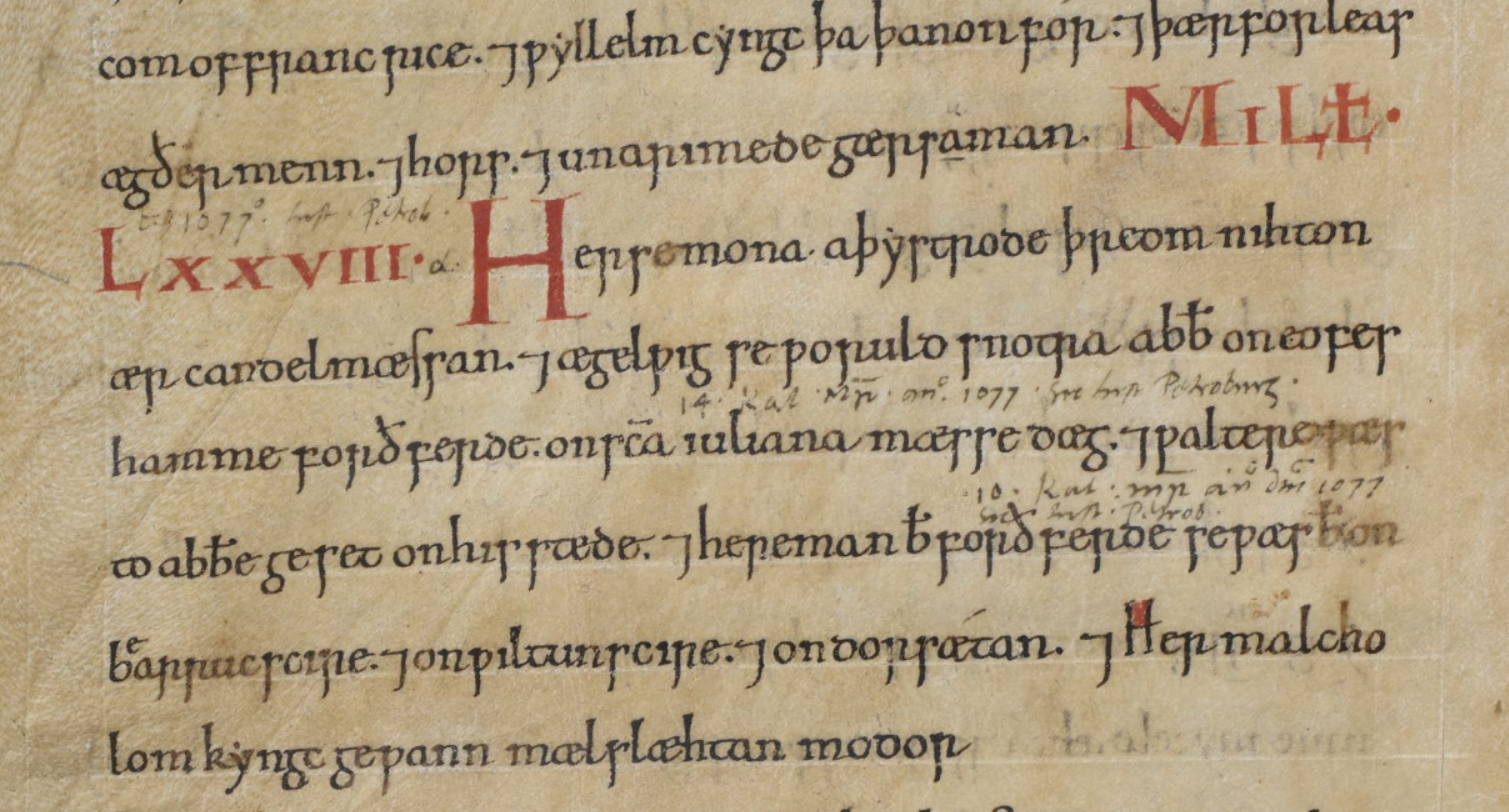
The death of Æthelwig in the Anglo-Saxon Chronicle (MS D)

Æthelwig died in either 1077 or 1078. The Chronicon gives his death date as 16 February 1077, but it is unclear if the Chronicon began its years on 1 January or in March, so the date could be 1077 or 1078.

== Writing about Æthelwig ==
A near-contemporary account of Æthelwig's life, or Vita, is included in the Chronicon Abbatiae de Evesham, the monastic chronicle for Evesham Abbey. This was a 13th-century work by Thomas of Marlborough, which was written to bolster Evesham's case for exemption from the jurisdiction of the Bishops of Worcester, in whose diocese Evensham was. To do this, Thomas incorporated earlier works dealing with Evesham's history, including the work on Æthelwig. However, because of Thomas' purpose in composing the Chronicon, he probably altered some of the texts he included, and it appears that the life of Æthelwig was first incorporated into a complete history of the abbey and then that composit work was adapted by Thomas into his Chronicon. The main evidence for this is internal stylistic evidence, where the Æthelwig material is stylistically uniform with other material dating to prior to 1077, with information after 1077 forming a separate writing style.

The historian R. R. Darlington argued that the Vita was written right after Æthelwig's death, but another historian, David Knowles, wrote that it probably was written about 1110, possibly by the prior of Evesham, Dominic. Antonia Gransden, another historian, agrees with Darlington, and finds it more likely to have been written shortly after Æthelwig's death. The work itself is not a hagiography, in that it doesn't attribute any miracles to Æthelwig, and instead is a mix of charters and narratives. Nor does it give any details on Æthelwig's early life or his selection as abbot. A large portion of the work is a detailed list of lands acquired by Æthelwig for the abbey, and concludes with a short description of the abbot's death.

== Citations ==
Catholic Church titles
Preceded by Mannig	Abbot of Evesham; 1058-c.1078	Succeeded by Walter
