= Walter (abbot of Evesham) =

- Abbot of Evesham
- Church: Evesham Abbey
- Installed: 1077/8
- Predecessor: Æthelwig
- Successor: Maurice

Orders
- Consecration: 1078

Personal details
- Born: unknown Cerisy, France
- Died: 1104

Walter, Abbot of Evesham or Walter de Cerisy, Gauthier de Cerisy was an 11th-century abbot and church leader in England under the Norman Conquest. He is known from the Domesday Book and several legal documents.

== Name ==
He is known variously as Walter de Cerisy, or more simply as Walter, a monk of Cerisy, a small village to the west of Bayeux in France. It is not known if he was born in the village or had lived in the abbey at Cerisy-la-Forêt.

== As abbot ==
Walter succeeded Æthelwig as abbot of Evesham, Worcestershire in 1077. He began the building of the new church, which had been designed by Æthelwig, and increased the number of monks. He incurred disapproval by granting abbey lands and offices to his relatives, especially by instituting a secular dean and steward, and making the office of steward hereditary within his own family.

== Legal cases ==
Walter is known for his varied legal actions, at a time that the newly established Norman kings were taking lands from the nobility and ecclesiastical estates.

=== Bishop Wulfstan ===
There was a court case between himself and Bishop Wulfstan, who pleaded before the king and established that "4 hides in Bengeworth, Worcester, and houses in the city of Worcester belonged to his holding, so that the abbot ought to do him service from them like his other tenants". The bishop also argued that

the sake and soke of Hampton, Worcestershire should belong to his hundred of Oswaldslow, so that the people of Hampton should plead there, pay geld there, do military service and the other royal services required from these hides, and pay church and burial dues there.

Wulfstan argued that these rights which Walter had refused to provide had been set in the time of Edward the Confessor. The witnesses were called, but before proceeding to trial Walter (on the advice of friends) confessed and accessed to Wulfstan.

=== Odo of Bayeux ===
In 1077 Odo of Bayeux, the brother of William the Conqueror brought an action against Walter as the Abbot of Evesham Abbey, claiming that certain lands were obtained illegally under the prior abbot, Æthelwig, whom he had recently succeeded.

Æthelwig had been a deputy of Ealdred, Bishop of Worcester, and, prior to being appointed abbot, Æthelwig had administered estates for Ealdred. Then, as abbot, Æthelwig had worked to recover estates that had been lost to Evesham, as well as acquiring more estates.

Although the charge of Æthelwig misappropriating lands is possible, Odo had already been in court actions with Ealdred over occasions where Odo had confiscated of lands held by Worcester, and this action could equally be seen as part of both the ongoing acquisition of estates by Odo and his continuing disagreement with Ealdred.

The court cases are part of a large collection of pleadings, at this time, against a process of Normanization that within a decade saw 64% of land in England consolidated into the hands of just 150 individuals, and many of the nobility deprived of their estates.

=== Urse d'Abetot ===
Walter appears to have been involved with the dispute between Urse d'Abetot, Sheriff of Worcestershire and the Bishops Wulfstan and Ealdred, of York. This dispute was also over land, in this case the misappropriation of bishopric estates by Urse, in his role as Sheriff.

== Historicity ==
Walter was a witness of a charter wherein Queen Matilda granted three hides at Garsdon in Wiltshire to Malmesbury Abbey.

He was recorded in the Domesday Book, where he is listed as a tenant-in-chief of several properties.

He was a witness to a charter of William the Conqueror that Bishop Wulfstan should "have fully his sake and soke, his services, and all the customs belonging to his hundreds of Oswaldslow".

The Domesday Book seems to indicate that, by 1088, Odo of Bayeux and Urse d'Abitôt had been successful in acquiring the lands they had claimed.

== Death ==
Walter died in 1104, according to the chronicle ascribed to Florence of Worcester.
