= Richard Bromsgrove =

Richard Bromsgrove (died 1435), was a monk of the Benedictine abbey of Evesham.

Bromsgrove, who doubtless derived his name (which is sometimes given under the form of Bremesgrave) from Bromsgrove in Worcestershire as his birthplace. He was elected Abbot of Evesham when infirmarer of the abbey, on 6 December 1418, and was consecrated in Bengeworth church by Bishop Barrow, of Bangor, who in the year previous had been Chancellor of Oxford. He died on 10 May 1435, after holding the abbacy for seventeen years, and was buried before the high altar in St. Mary's chapel in the abbey church.

The register of his acts during his abbacy is preserved in Cotton MS. Titus C. ix. (ff. 1–38). It contains articles for the reformation of monasteries which were proposed by Henry V in 1421, with modifications suggested by various abbots. It appears from this register (f. 32) that he wrote a tract, 'De fraterna correctione canonice exercenda.' A transcript of the register exists amongst the collections of James West in Lansdowne MS. 227, British Museum.

== Sources ==
- "Bromsgrove, Richard" . Dictionary of National Biography. London: Smith, Elder & Co. 1885–1900.
- Cox, D.C. (2004). "Bromsgrove, Richard". Oxford Dictionary of National Biography (online ed.). Oxford University Press. doi:10.1093/ref:odnb/3520. (Subscription or UK public library membership required.)

Attribution

This article incorporates text from a publication now in the public domain: "Bromsgrove, Richard". Dictionary of National Biography. London: Smith, Elder & Co. 1885–1900.
