= Randulf of Evesham =

13th-century Bishop of Worcester-elect

- Bishop of Worcester-elect
- Elected: 2 December 1213
- Quashed: 1214
- Predecessor: Mauger of Worcester
- Successor: Walter de Grey
- Previous post: Prior of Evesham

Orders
- Consecration: never consecrated

Personal details
- Died: 17 December 1229
- Denomination: Catholic

Randulf of Evesham was a medieval Bishop of Worcester-elect and Abbot of Evesham.

== Life ==
Randulf was a monk of Evesham Abbey before becoming Prior of Worcester on 24 December 1204. On 2 December 1213 he was elected to the see of Worcester but his election was quashed by the papal legate for England, Niccolò de Romanis, cardinal bishop of Tusculum, sometime before 20 January 1214 when Randulf was elected Abbot of Evesham.

Randulf was elected as abbot on 22 January 1214, and was blessed by the papal legate at St Mary's, York on 10 March 1214. He died 17 December 1229.

== Citations ==
Catholic Church titles
Preceded by Roger Norreis	Abbot of Evesham; 1214–1229	Succeeded by Thomas of Marlborough
Preceded by Mauger of Worcester	Bishop of Worcester; 1213–1214	Succeeded by Walter de Grey
