= Abbot of Evesham =

List of medieval abbots of Evesham Abbey in England

The Abbot of Evesham was the head of Evesham Abbey, a Benedictine monastery in Worcestershire founded in the Anglo-Saxon era of English history. The succession continued until the dissolution of the monastery in 1540.

== List ==
Abbots of St Mary of Evesham
From	Until	Incumbent	Citation(s)	Notes
fl. 692–717		Ecgwine		Founding abbot and saint
dates unclear		Æthelwold		First in Thomas of Marlborough's abbot list
dates unclear		Aldbore		Second in Thomas of Marlborough's abbot list
dates unclear		Aldbeorth		Third in Thomas of Marlborough's abbot list
dates unclear		Aldfrith		Fourth in Thomas of Marlborough's abbot list
dates unclear		Tilhberht		Fifth in Thomas of Marlborough's abbot list
dates unclear		Cuthwulf		Sixth in Thomas of Marlborough's abbot list
dates unclear		Aldmund		Seventh in Thomas of Marlborough's abbot list
dates unclear		Credan		Eighth in Thomas of Marlborough's abbot list
dates unclear		Thingfrith		Ninth in Thomas of Marlborough's abbot list
dates unclear		Aldbald		Tenth in Thomas of Marlborough's abbot list
dates unclear		Ecgberht		Eleventh in Thomas of Marlborough's abbot list
dates unclear		Ælfrith		Twelfth in Thomas of Marlborough's abbot list
dates unclear		Wulfweard		Thirteenth in Thomas of Marlborough's abbot list
dates unclear		Cynelm		Fourteenth in Thomas of Marlborough's abbot list
dates unclear		Cynath I		Fifteenth in Thomas of Marlborough's abbot list
dates unclear		Ebba		Sixteenth in Thomas of Marlborough's abbot list
dates unclear		Cynath II		Seventeenth in Thomas of Marlborough's abbot list
dates unclear		Edwine		Eighteenth in Thomas of Marlborough's abbot list
c. 970	expelled 975	Osweard		Abbey was secularised in 975, but afterwards went into the hands of one "Bishop Agelsius" (probably Æthelsige I, Bishop of Sherborne, resigned, translated or died 990 x 992), afterwards to Bishop Ælfstan (either Ælfstan, Bishop of Rochester (died 995), or Ælfstan, Bishop of London (died 995 x 996), after whose death Ealdwulf, Bishop of Worcester, established Ælfric and Ælfgar as abbots.
995 x 997	unclear	Ælfric		
997 x 1002	unclear	Ælfgar		
dates unclear		Brihtmaer		
unclear	c. 1013	Ælthelwine		Became Bishop of Wells, c. 1013
c. 1014	died 1044	Ælfweard		Became Bishop of London c. 1016, but retained abbey of Evesham until death
1044	resigned 1058	Mannig (or Wulfmær)		Suffered paralysis and resigned 1058; died on epiphany, i.e. 6 January 1066
1058	died c. 1077	Æthelwig		
1077	died 1104	Walter de Cerisy		
unclear	died 1130	Maurice		
1130	died or resigned 1149	Reginald Foliot		Uncle of Gilbert Foliot
1149	died 1159	William de Andeville		
1159	1160	Roger		
1161	died 1189	Adam de Senlis		
1190	resigned 1213	Roger Norreis		Became Prior of Penwortham, an Evesham dependency
1214	died 1229	Randulf		Previously Prior of Worcester and Bishop-elect of Worcester
1230	died 1236	Thomas of Marlborough		
1236	died 1242	Richard le Gras		Was elected Bishop of Coventry in 1241, but either declined office or died before this disputed election was resolved
1243	died or resigned 1255	Thomas of Gloucester		
1256	died 1263	Henry of Worcester		
1263	died or resigned 1266	William of Malborough		
1266	died 1282	William of Whitechurch		
1282	died 1316	John of Brockhampton		
1316	died 1344	William de Chiriton		
1345	died 1367	William du Boys		
1367	died 1379	John of Ombersley		
1379	1418	Roger Zatton		
1418	1435	Richard Bromsgrove		
1435	c. 1460	John Wykewan		
1460	1467	Richard Pembroke		
1467	1477	Richard Hawkesbury		
1477	1483	William Upton		
1483	1491	John Norton		
1491	1514	Thomas Newbold		
1514	1539	Clement Litchfield, Lychfeld or Wych		Died October 1546, buried in the southern chapel (built at his expense) of All Saints, Evesham
1539	1540	Philip Hawford (or Ballard)		
