= Thomas of Marlborough =

13th-century English abbot and writer

- Abbot of Evesham
- Elected: 1229
- Installed: 29 September 1230
- Term ended: 13 July 1236 (resigned)
- Predecessor: Mannig
- Successor: Walter

Personal details
- Born: Thomas
- Died: 12 September 1236

Thomas of Marlborough (died 1236) (sometimes Thomas de Marleberge) was a medieval English monk and writer. He became abbot of Evesham Abbey in 1230.

== Biography ==
Thomas studied civil and canon law at Paris where he studied under Stephen Langton, later Archbishop of Canterbury. He made friends with Richard Poore, later Bishop of Chichester, Salisbury and Durham, while a student. After finishing his studies, Thomas taught at Oxford University before becoming a monk around 1199 at Evesham. While at Oxford, he also studied with John of Tynemouth, a canon lawyer and later Archdeacon of Oxford.

Thomas was the author of a history of the abbots and abbey of Evesham, entitled the Chronicon Abbatiae de Evesham, or Chronicle of the Abbey of Evesham. Thomas' main purpose in writing the Chronicon was to show that Evesham was exempt from the supervision of the Bishops of Worcester. In writing his work, Thomas incorporated an earlier work on the history of the abbey. This earlier work was probably composed by Dominic of Evesham, a monk at Evesham around 1125. Most of the evidence for Thomas' incorporation of an earlier work is stylistic, but it appears likely that Thomas reworked it in order to strengthen his argument.

Thomas needed evidence to help Evesham's legal case due to the conflict between the abbey and Mauger, the Bishop of Worcester, which began when Mauger attempted to visit and inspect the abbey in 1201. Thomas was one of the leading defenders of the rights of the abbey, in what was to turn into a long drawn out legal case before the king and then the papacy. Although it was suspended with the exile of Mauger during the Interdict on England in King John's reign, it was later revived, and finally decided in 1248. However, the case against the bishop became entangled with a dispute within the abbey between the monks and the abbot Roger Norreis over the payment of the costs of the legal fight with Mauger, which eventually resulted in the expulsion of Norreis in 1213.

Thomas was previously the prior of Evesham before being elected by the monks in 1229. However, his election was not considered valid until he was admitted to the office by the pope, which occurred before he was blessed in the office around 11 July 1230. He was enthroned as abbot on 29 September 1230.

After Thomas had petitioned the papacy for permission to resign the abbacy on the grounds of old age and physical disability, the pope gave permission to the Bishop of Coventry to allow his resignation on 13 July 1236. Thomas died on 12 September 1236.

== Citations ==
Catholic Church titles
Preceded by Randulf of Evesham	Abbot of Evesham; 1230–1236	Succeeded by Richard le Gras
