= Ælfhun (bishop of London) =

11th-century bishop of London

- Bishop of London
- Appointed: between 1002 and 1004
- Term ended: 16 February 1014
- Predecessor: Wulfstan II
- Successor: Ælfwig

Orders
- Consecration: between 1002 and 1004

Ælfhun (also Alfune) was the bishop of London, consecrated between 1002 and 1004 during the reign of King Æthelred II. He may previously have been abbot of Milton Abbey and appears in contemporary sources as a royal official.

As bishop of London, Ælfhun is recorded to have received and buried the body of Archbishop Ælfheah at St Paul's Cathedral in 1012. In 1013 he accompanied the royal princes Edward and Alfred into exile in Normandy, where he may have acted as their tutor. The end of his episcopate is uncertain. Although his successor Ælfwig was consecrated in 1014, some evidence suggests that Ælfhun may have remained active thereafter. A later tradition associated him with the building of the church of St Giles-without-Cripplegate in London.

== Life ==
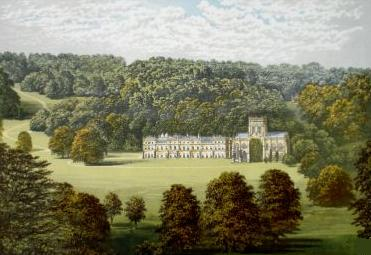
Milton Abbey, where Ælfhun may have served as abbot

Very little is known about the early life of Ælfhun, reflecting the broader scarcity of records for early medieval bishops of London. Writing in the 12th century, William of Malmesbury observed that such bishops were often so obscure that even their deeds and burial places were unknown, and that it was considered notable simply to be able to recall their names. Nevertheless, he includes Ælfhun among the succession of bishops in his Gesta Pontificum Anglorum.

Ælfhun first appeared, although not certainly identified, in the late 10th century as abbot of Milton Abbey in Dorset. He may be identifiable with an Ælfhun who appears in charters between 975 and the 990s, suggesting a longer ecclesiastical career prior to his elevation to the bishopric of London. As abbot, he is recorded at a royal assembly in Canterbury convened to resolve a dispute over the estate of Snodland in Kent. He may have acted on behalf of King Æthelred II. The settlement allowed the layholder Leofwine to retain Snodland for life, after which it was to revert to the church of Rochester.

Following his time as abbot, Ælfhun succeeded Wulfstan as bishop of London some time between 1002 and 1004. Like Wulfstan, Ælfhun appears to have had a monastic background. His status as bishop is further attested by his appearance as a witness in a charter of King Æthelred II dated to around 1000, where he is identified as a bishop (episcopus). In 1012, Ælfhun, along with Bishop Eadnoth, received and buried the body of Archbishop Ælfheah at St Paul’s Cathedral after he was killed by a raiding army at Greenwich.

Around the same period, he was accused by the hagiographer Hermann of attempting to remove the body of St Edmund of East Anglia from St Gregory’s Church in London, where it had been brought for safekeeping between 1009 and 1012. According to Hermann, the attempt failed when the bishop and his attendants were unable to move the bier. He interpreted this as a miraculous sign that Edmund did not consent to the translation of his relics, since such movements were understood to require the saint’s approval.

In 1013, during the Danish invasion of England, Ælfhun was sent overseas with the royal princes Edward and Alfred by King Æthelred II, most likely to the ducal court in Normandy. According to Florence of Worcester, he acted as tutor (magister) to the young princes, and he appears to have served as their guardian during the exile. There is no further contemporary reference to Ælfhun after this point.

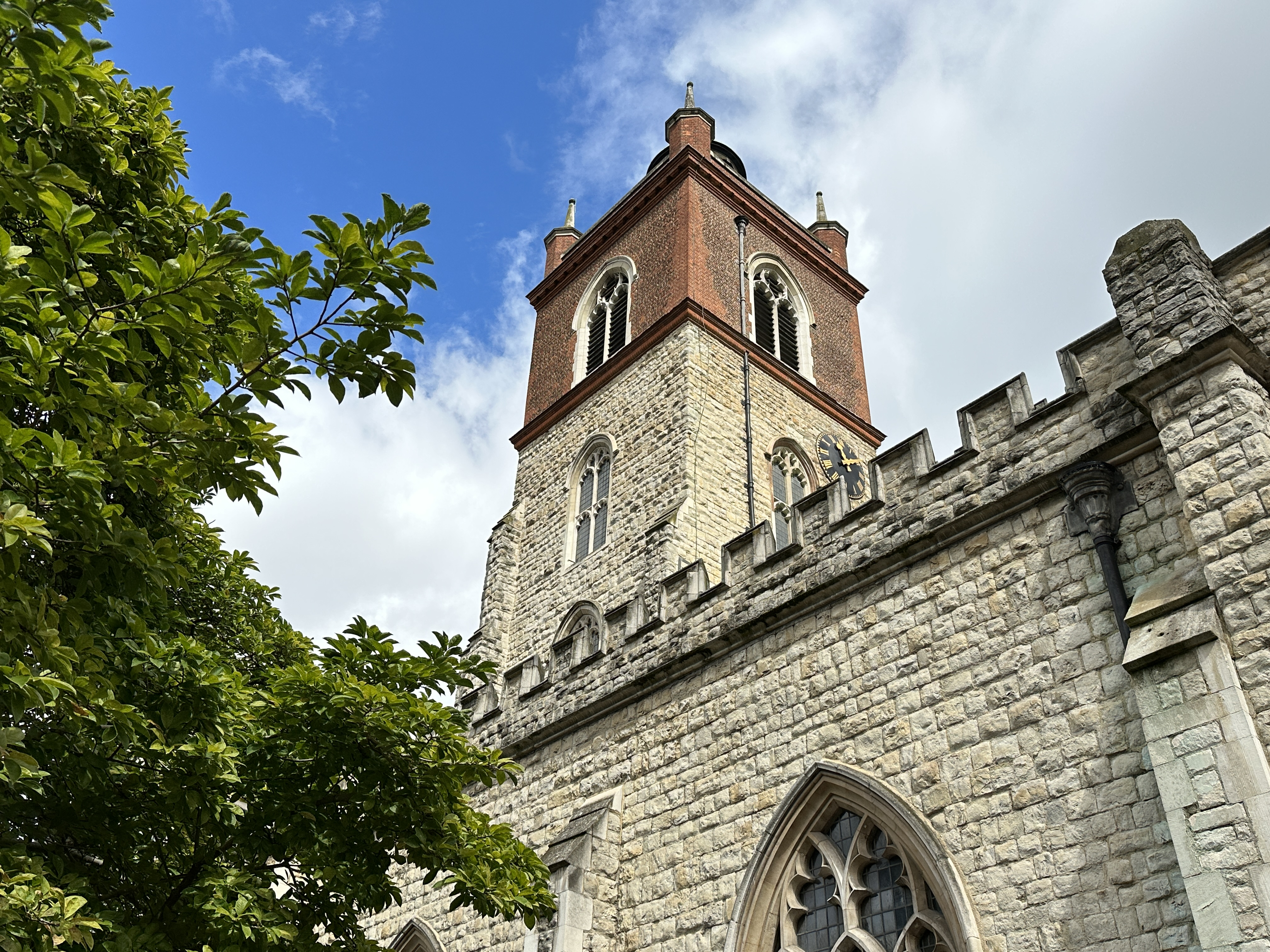
St Giles-without-Cripplegate, traditionally associated with Ælfhun

Writing in the 16th century, John Stow associated Ælfhun with the building of the parish church of St Giles-without-Cripplegate. The church's name refers to its location outside Cripplegate, one of the gates in the London Wall. He also stated that Ælfhun later served there as its first hospitaller, a religious official responsible for caring for the poor, personally collecting alms in markets. Stow dated the church’s construction to around 1090. Later accounts, drawing on parish records, likewise place the church’s completion in 1090 and associate Ælfhun with the early development of the nearby priory of St Bartholomew-the-Great. According to these accounts, following Ælfhun’s death, the church passed to one Almund, who later bequeathed it to the canons of St Paul’s Cathedral, whose dean and chapter subsequently appointed its vicars.

== Death ==
Ælfhun's date of death is unknown, and the end of his episcopate is uncertain. His successor, Ælfwig, was consecrated bishop of London on 16 February 1014, indicating that Ælfhun had ceased to hold the see by that date, either through death or resignation.

Some historians, however, have suggested that he may have returned to England after accompanying the royal princes into exile and was reinstated as bishop. This interpretation is uncertain. A charter dated to around 1015 has been taken to indicate that an Ælfhun was still active at that time, but the identification is disputed and the reference may instead belong to his successor.

== Citations ==
Christian titles
Preceded by Wulfstan II	Bishop of London c. 1003–c. 1014	Succeeded by Ælfwig
