= Ælfwig =

11th-century Bishop of London

- Bishop of London
- Province: Canterbury
- Appointed: before 16 February 1014
- Term ended: c. 1035
- Predecessor: Ælfhun
- Successor: Ælfweard

Orders
- Consecration: 16 February 1014

Personal details
- Died: c. 1035
- Denomination: Christian

Ælfwig (died c. 1035) was a medieval Bishop of London.

Ælfwig was consecrated on 16 February 1014 and acceded to the bishopric some time between 1015 and 1018. He died about 1035.

== Citations ==
Christian titles
Preceded by Ælfhun	Bishop of London; 1014–c. 1035	Succeeded by Ælfweard
