= John McKenna (sculptor) =

Scottish sculptor

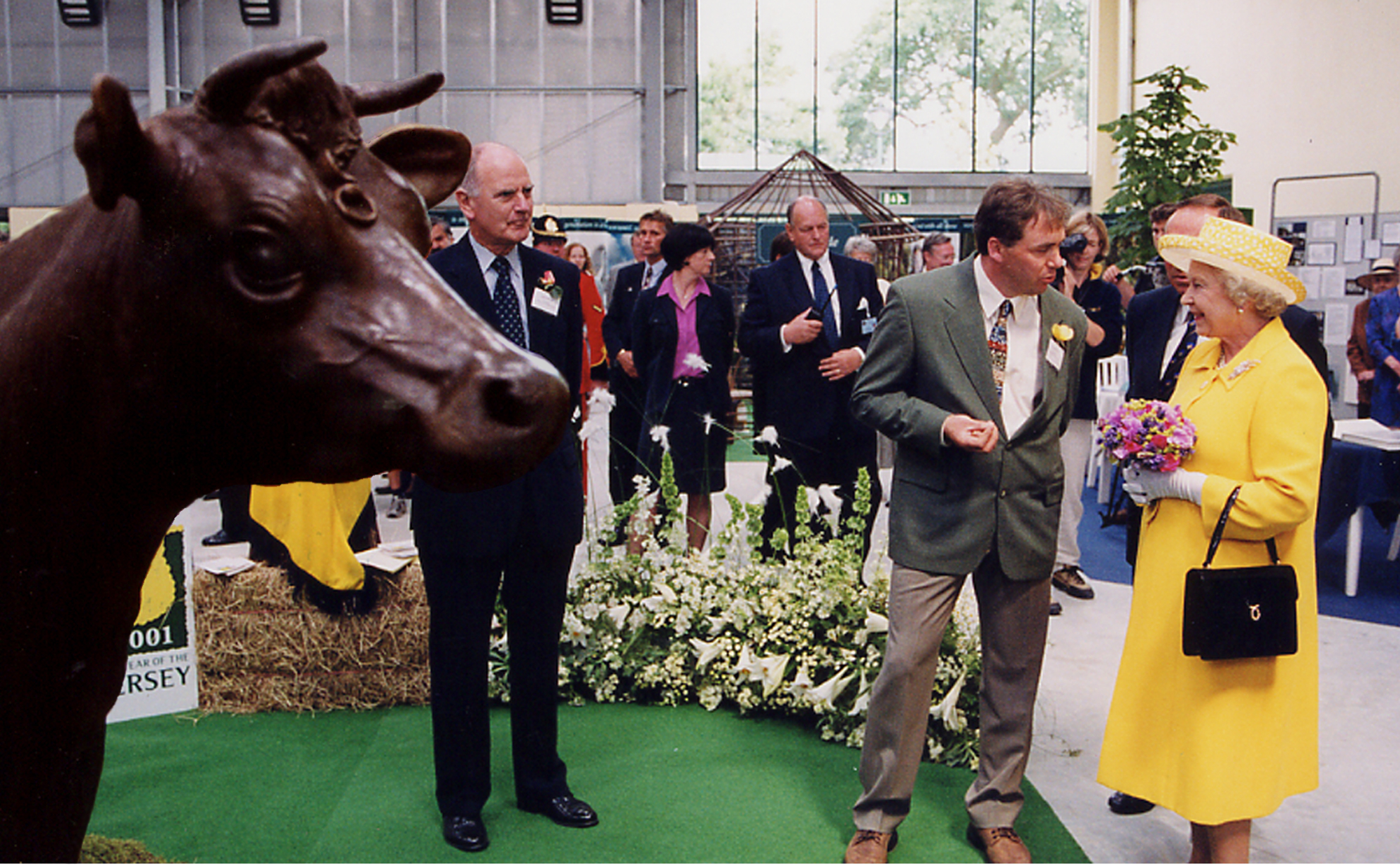
- McKenna with Queen Elizabeth II and his Jersey Cattle sculpture
- Born: 1964 (age 61–62); Manchester, England
- Education: Royal Grammar School Worcester
- Alma mater: Middlesex Polytechnic Art College
- Occupation: Sculptor

John McKenna (born 1964) is a Scottish sculptor born in Manchester. He is based in Turnberry, South Ayrshire, Scotland.

== Education and early years (1993–2002) ==
McKenna moved to Worcestershire where he attended the Royal Grammar School in Worcester. He studied at Middlesex Polytechnic Art College in north London. In 1987 he gained a bursary to study at the Sir Henry Doulton School of Sculpture. From 1990 to 1993 he lectured at Stafford College of further education in figurative classical sculpture and at Worcester College of Technology where he taught three dimensional design. He was elected a member of the Royal British Society of Sculptors in 1993 and from this point on resigned his lecturing duties to become a full-time profession public art sculptor. In 1996 McKenna sited his sculpture studio at Crown East lane, Worcester. Here he made many of his public art commissions including the 'family of instruments', commissioned by the Crown Estate for Bell Square, Worcester City and the Jersey Cattle group bronze sculpture celebrating the cattle breed 'The Year of the Jersey 2001'. This particular commission saw McKenna's work on the breed of cattle being introduced to Her Majesty Queen Elizabeth II at the opening of the Royal Jersey Agricultural & Horticultural building, Trinity, Jersey.

== Relocation to Scotland (2002) ==
By the year 2002 McKenna was commissioned to produce the main artwork on the Cunard Line transatlantic liner, Queen Mary 2, and his existing studio facilities in Worcestershire were rapidly becoming too small for the greater scale of artworks that he was starting to be commissioned for. Driven by the shortage of economically viable studio space and with the Queen Mary 2 commission contract signed, he relocated the studio to a small holding farm on the South West coast of Scotland. From the new larger studios in Scotland, McKenna was able to create much larger artworks in fabricated metals. The Queen Mary 2 Cunard commission being 20 ft by 23 ft bas-relief in sheet bronze and stainless steel, a portrait of the ship itself. McKenna later went on to create the staircase feature in the sister ship Queen Victoria, again a relief portrait of the ship itself. Both relief sculptures were carrying on the panel theme from the original Queen Mary ship built in Clydebank and launched in 1934. Back on land McKenna was commissioned to create a bronze statue of the swineherd Eof, in Evesham, Worcestershire. McKenna's design for Eof was selected in the year 1999 by public competition but it took the town several years to raise the funds to pay for the statue.

== Larger Public Art projects (2006–present) ==
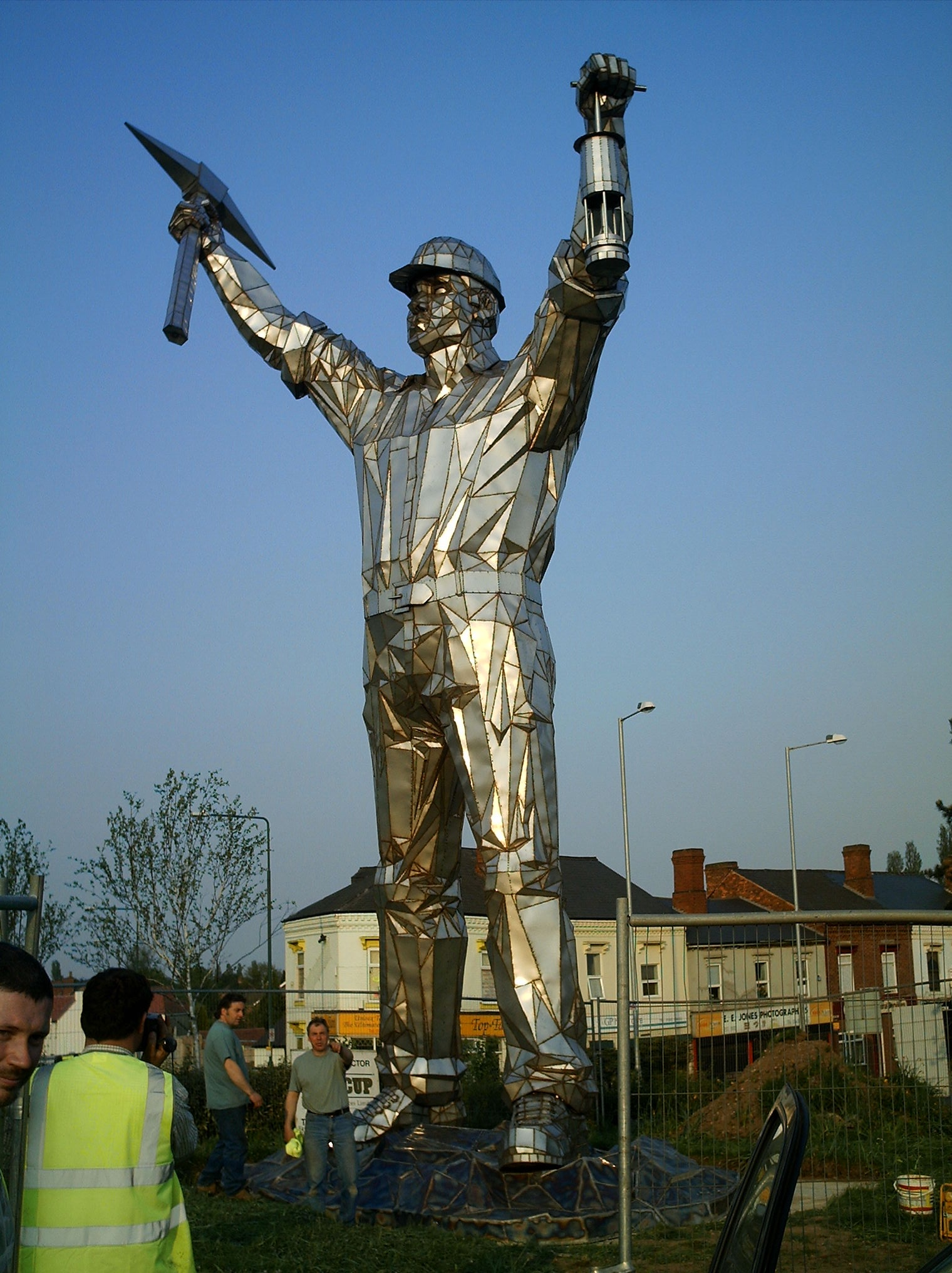
'Jigger' colossus miner statue in Brownhills

In 2006 the larger studios at the farm to which McKenna relocated enabled him to extend into fabricating larger stainless steel sculptural structures. The new facilities saw the creation of a colossal mining figure, named 'Jigger' commissioned by the Walsall Metropolitan Borough Council for a site in Brownhills. This 5 metric ton type 304 stainless steel sculpture of a miner stands approximately 13 metres (43 ft) in height, brandishing a pickaxe and lamp, a monumental tribute to the local coal mining industry of this industrial area. It became the biggest representational sculpture figure of a miner in the UK and a significant public artwork for that area of the Black Country. It was named 'Jigger' after Jack 'Jigger' Taylor, a local coal miner, who died in an industrial accident when the roof of the pit at Walsall Wood where he was working collapsed, in 1951.

In 2007 McKenna set up the A4A art for architecture studio sculpture foundry where he started casting his own bronze sculpture and statues. He also created a bronze statue The Miner of Auchengeich as a memorial in Moodiesburn near Glasgow.

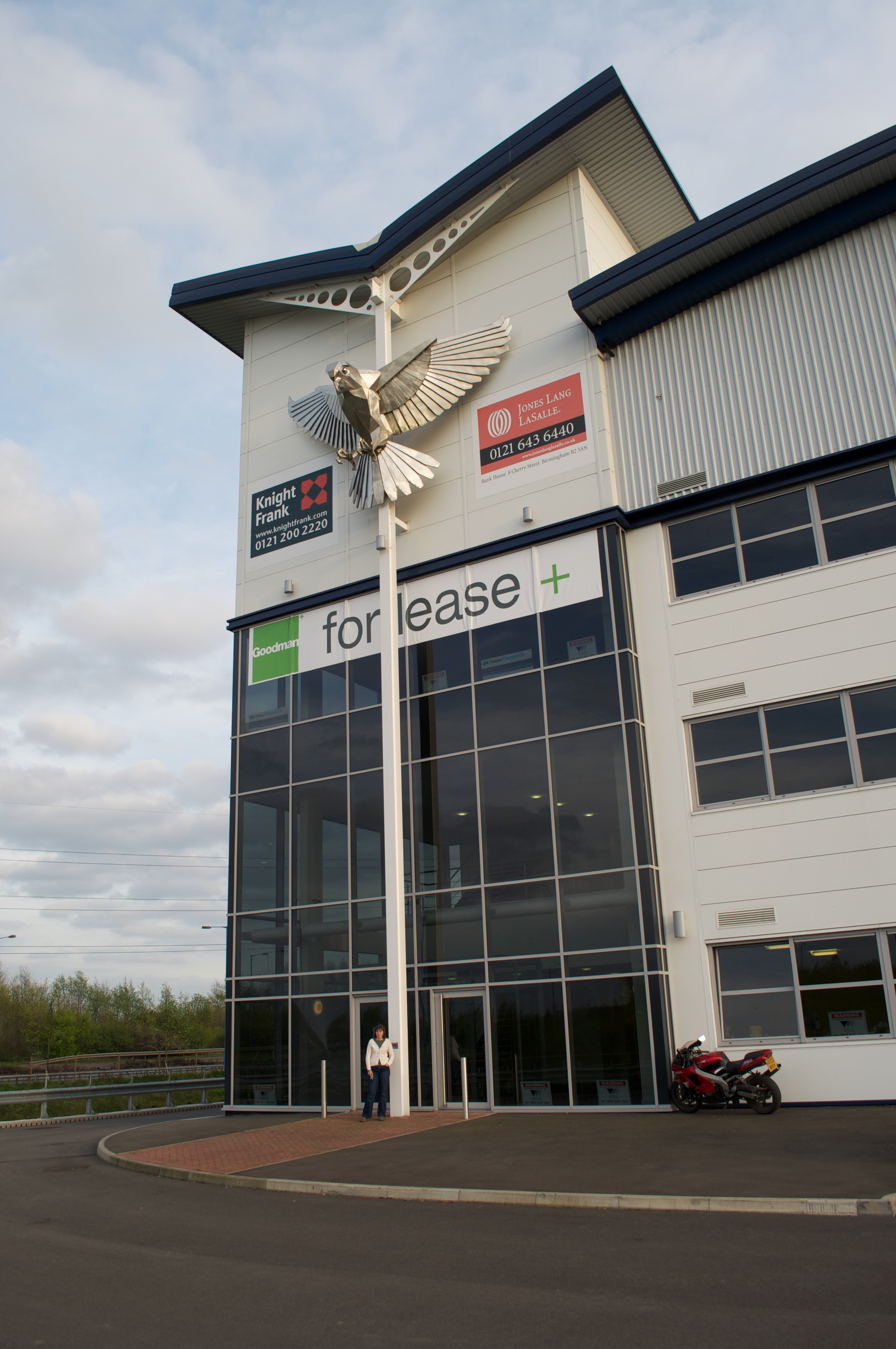
'Hovering Kestrel'

McKenna's stainless steel sculpture of a 'Hovering Kestrel' measures six metres across its wingspan by four metres high, sited on a building facade 14 metres high. The Kestrel was commissioned by the client for the Citadel Logistics Building on the Black Country Spine route, near Bilston in the West Midlands. The Kestrel concept for the artwork came about through design research work undertaken by A4A associate Steve Field drawing on Natural History information on the former site.

== Sporting Sculpture statues ==
McKenna's commissions include statues of footballers: Jock Stein at Celtic Park, Glasgow and of Jimmy Johnstone in the Jimmy Johnstone Memorial Garden, Old Edinburgh Road, Viewpark, Lanarkshire.

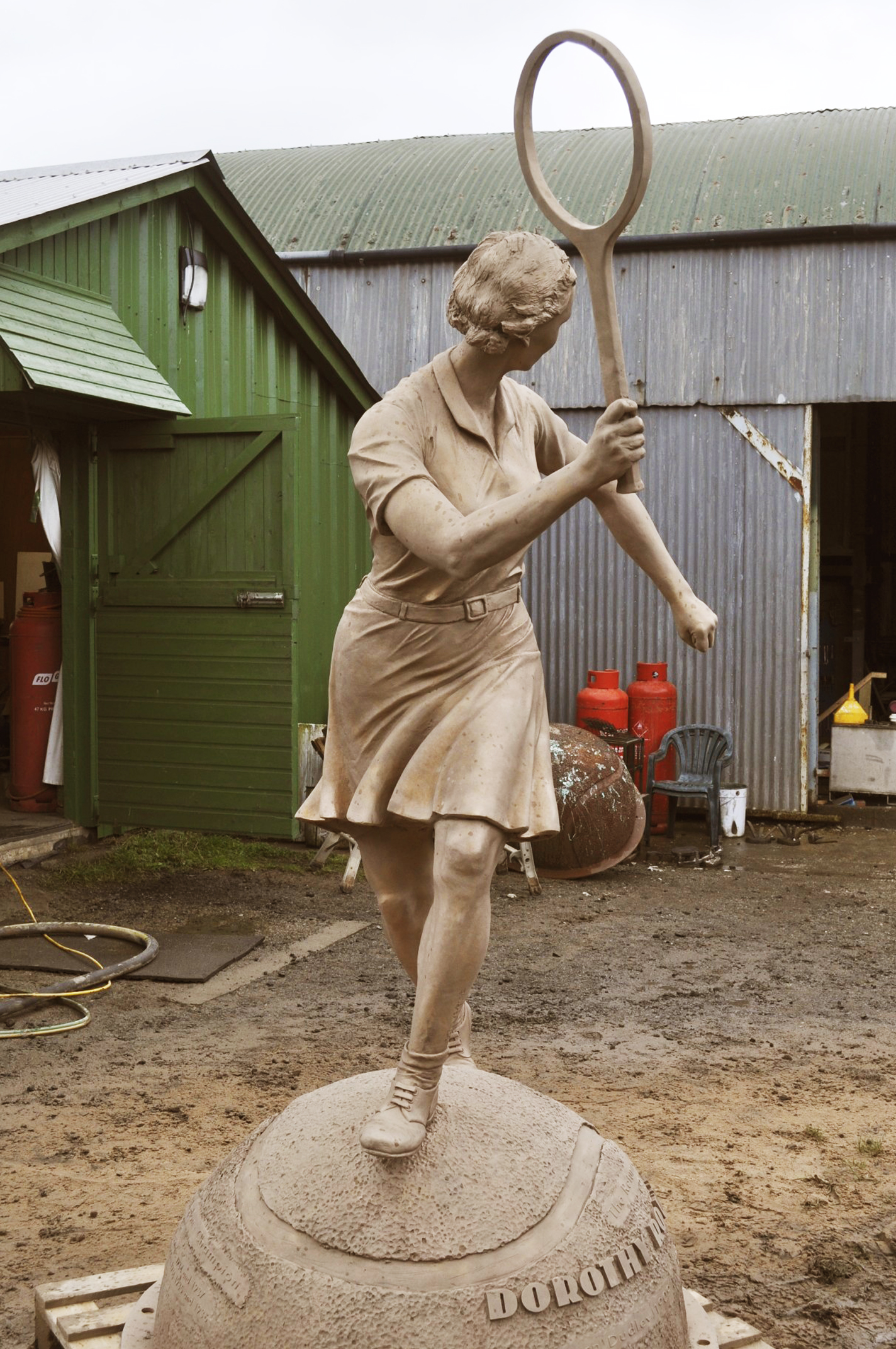
Dorothy Round Little portrait statue in bronze

On 20 September 2013 the town of Dudley commemorated the Wimbledon Tennis Champion Dorothy Round by erecting McKenna's lifesize bronze statue to her in Priory Park, Dudley. The statue was cast at the A4A studio foundry and depicts Round making a return play of the ball, based on an old photo, as conceived by Steve Field. It was unveiled by the subject's daughter.

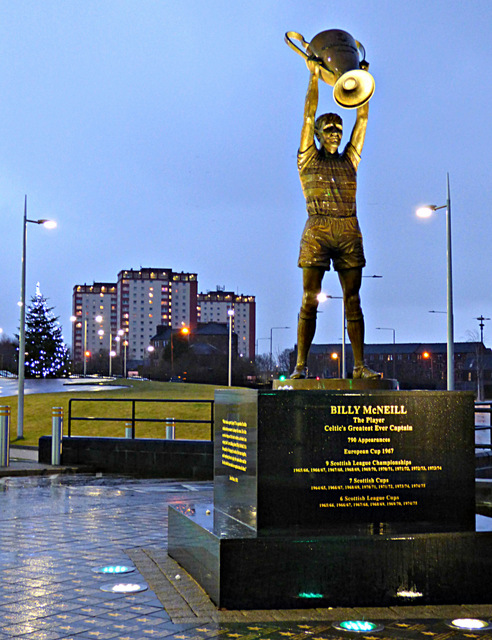
McKenna's statue of Billy McNeill outside Celtic Park

During 2015 the football club Celtic F.C. commissioned McKenna to create a lifesize statue of the Lisbon Lions captain Billy McNeill. The statue depicts the moment McNeill lifted the European Cup after Celtic won the 1967 final. The statue was unveiled outside the Parkhead stadium on 19 December 2015.

== Bon Scott ==
In 2016, McKenna's sculpture of former AC/DC frontman, Bon Scott was unveiled in his hometown of Kirriemuir. The statue has been funded via a crowdfunding which had raised over £45,000 to see the work completed.
