= Ælfweard of London =

11th-century Bishop of London

Ælfweard
- Bishop of London
- Appointed: 1035
- Term ended: July 1044
- Predecessor: Ælfwig
- Successor: Robert of Jumièges

Orders
- Consecration: 1035

Personal details
- Died: 25 or 27 July 1044
- Denomination: Christian

Ælfweard (died 1044) was a medieval Bishop of London.

A monk from Ramsey Abbey in Huntingdonshire who became the Abbot of Evesham in 1014, Ælfweard became Bishop of London but retained Evesham. He was consecrated in 1035, but when he developed leprosy he was expelled from Evesham and he returned to Ramsey. He died on either 25 or 27 July 1044.

== Citations ==
Christian titles
Preceded by Æthelwine	Abbot of Evesham; 1014-1044	Succeeded by Mannig
Preceded by Ælfwig	Bishop of London; 1035–1044	Succeeded by Robert of Jumièges
