= All Saints Church, Evesham =

Coordinates: 52.091949°N 1.947073°W

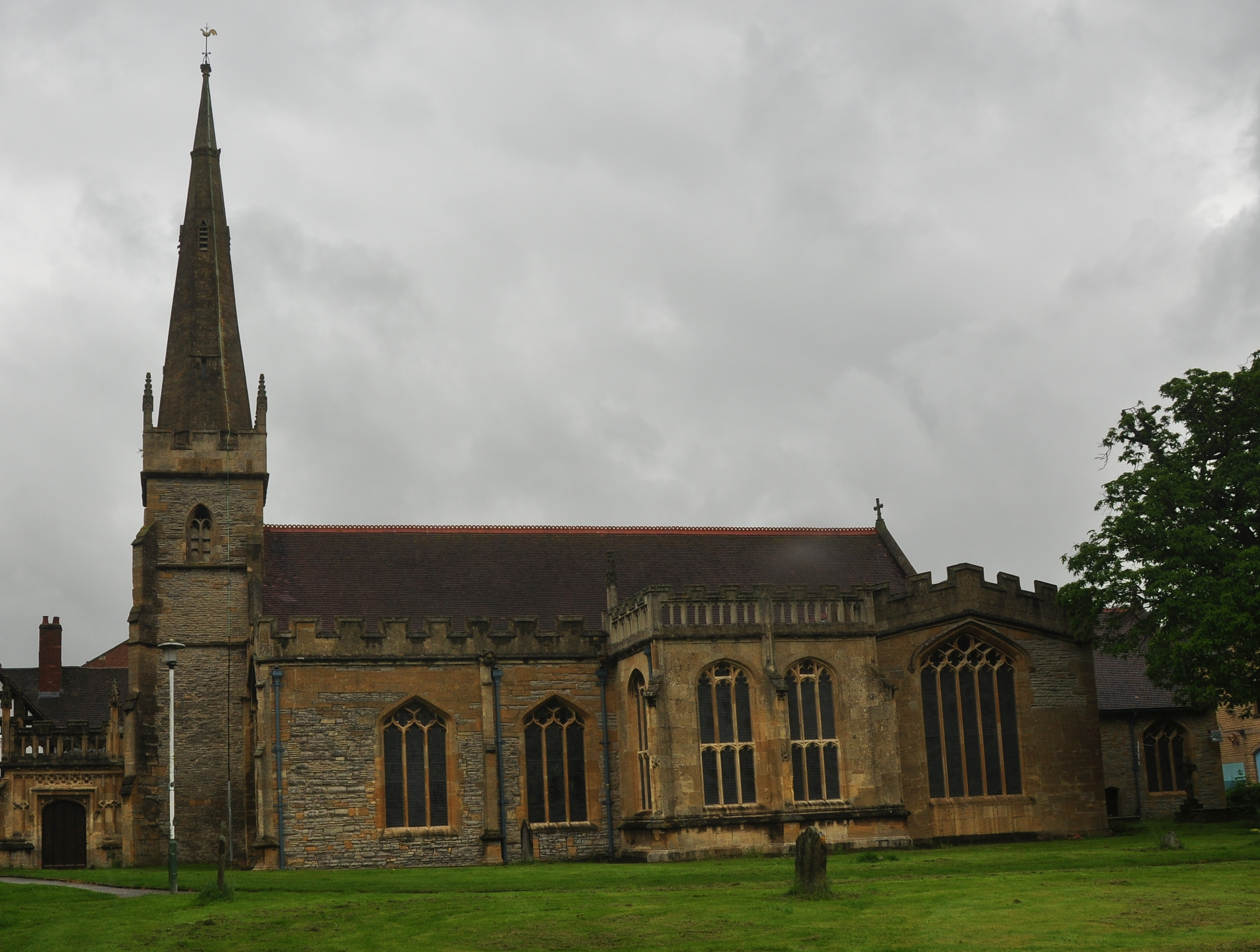
- All Saints Church, Evesham
- Location: Market Place, Evesham, Worcestershire, WR11 4RW
- Country: England
- Denomination: Church of England
- Website: Parish website

History
- Status: Active

Architecture
- Functional status: Parish church
- Heritage designation: Grade I listed
- Designated: 7 May 1952

Administration
- Diocese: Diocese of Worcester
- Archdeaconry: Archdeaconry of Worcester
- Deanery: Evesham Deanery
- Parish: All Saints Evesham with St. Lawrence Evesham

Clergy
- Vicar: The Revd Andrew Spurr

All Saints Church is an active Anglican church in the centre of the town of Evesham, Worcestershire, England. All Saints and its neighbour St Lawrence's Church were built by the Benedictine monks of Evesham Abbey in the 12th century to serve the people of Evesham. All Saints is now the town's parish church, as St Lawrence's was declared redundant in the 1970s.

It has been designated as a Grade I listed building by Historic England.

== History ==
Intriguingly, the two parish churches share the same churchyard. After the Dissolution All Saints adopted a strongly Puritan method of preaching and worship (in common with many other English churches). This style lasted until, roughly, the major Victorian restoration (1872-6) by Frederick Preedy, when All Saints moved to a high church (Anglo-Catholic) tradition of worship. Through the 1970s it became increasingly clear that the upkeep of two medieval churches, with all the attendant challenges and problems, was too great a burden for the two congregations. A series of meetings and discussions, led by the Revd Canon A. Webb, led to the decision to keep only one church: All Saints. The parish of St Lawrence, Evesham, was declared redundant on 8 December 1977. In the following year the church was vested in the Redundant Churches Fund (since 1994 called Churches Conservation Trust). and on 1 January 1978 the parishes of All Saints and St Lawrence were united. Following this amalgamation the worship at All Saints moved more to a ‘middle churchmanship’ style.

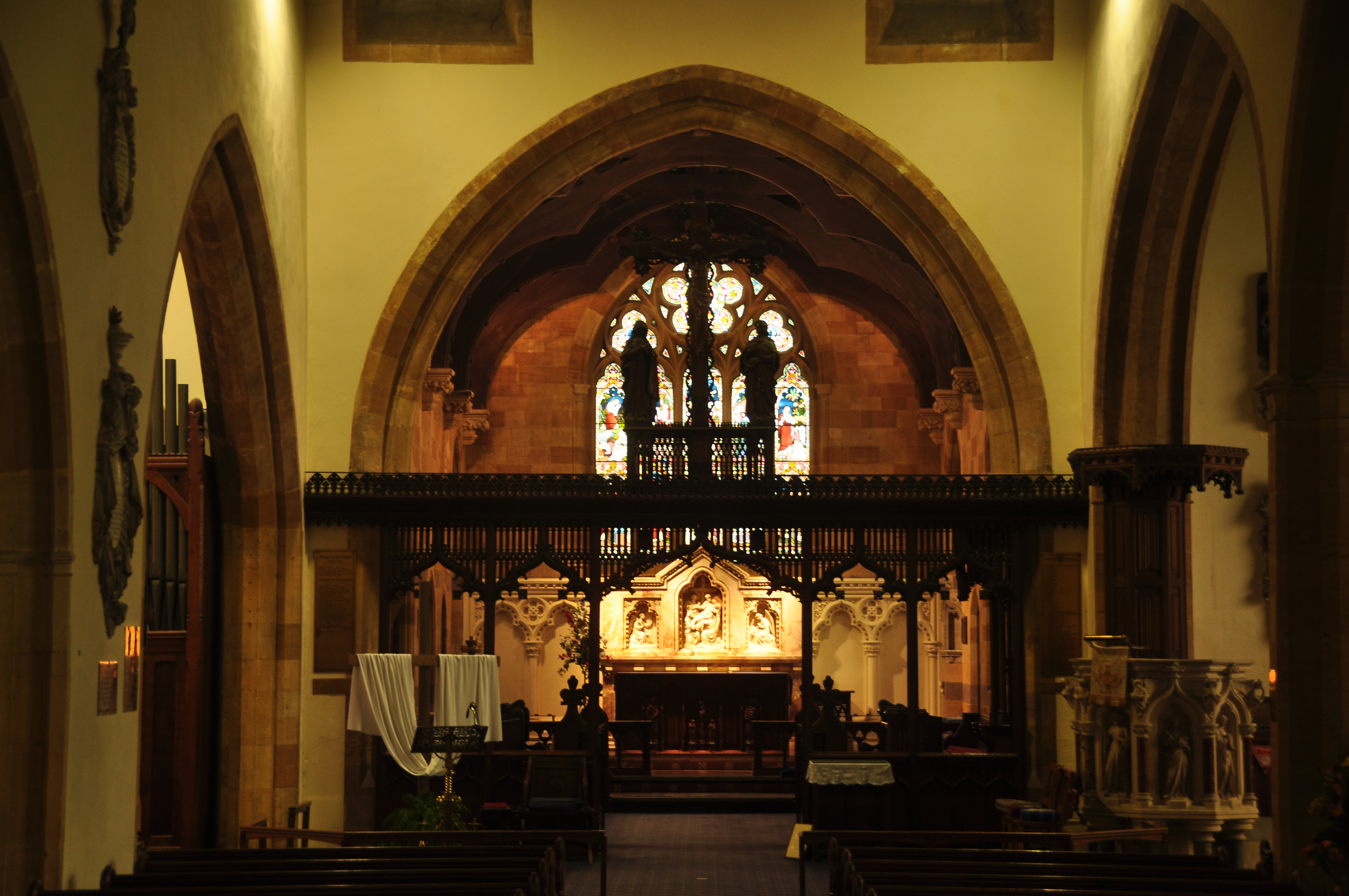
The nave of the church, looking towards the altar.

== Organ ==
The first-recorded church organ in All Saints was originally built for the Rotunda in Ranelagh Gardens, Chelsea, where it may have been played by Mozart. In 1805, after Rotunda had been broken up, the great reeds were taken out and the organ taken to Evesham. This organ was replaced as part of the Victorian restoration of the church. In 1875 a new organ, built by Nicholson with 3 manual positions and a pneumatic action, was installed in the new organ loft. In 1904, as a memorial of the foundation of Evesham Abbey (701) and the reign of Queen Victoria (1837-1901), the organ was enlarged and improved by the addition of a third manual pneumatic action and extra stops. In 1967 the organ was significantly enlarged by Nicholson. In 1991 the organ was significantly rebuilt by Nicholson, now with electronic controls and a mobile console.
