= Dominic of Evesham =

12th-century monk, Prior of Evesham Abbey, and writer

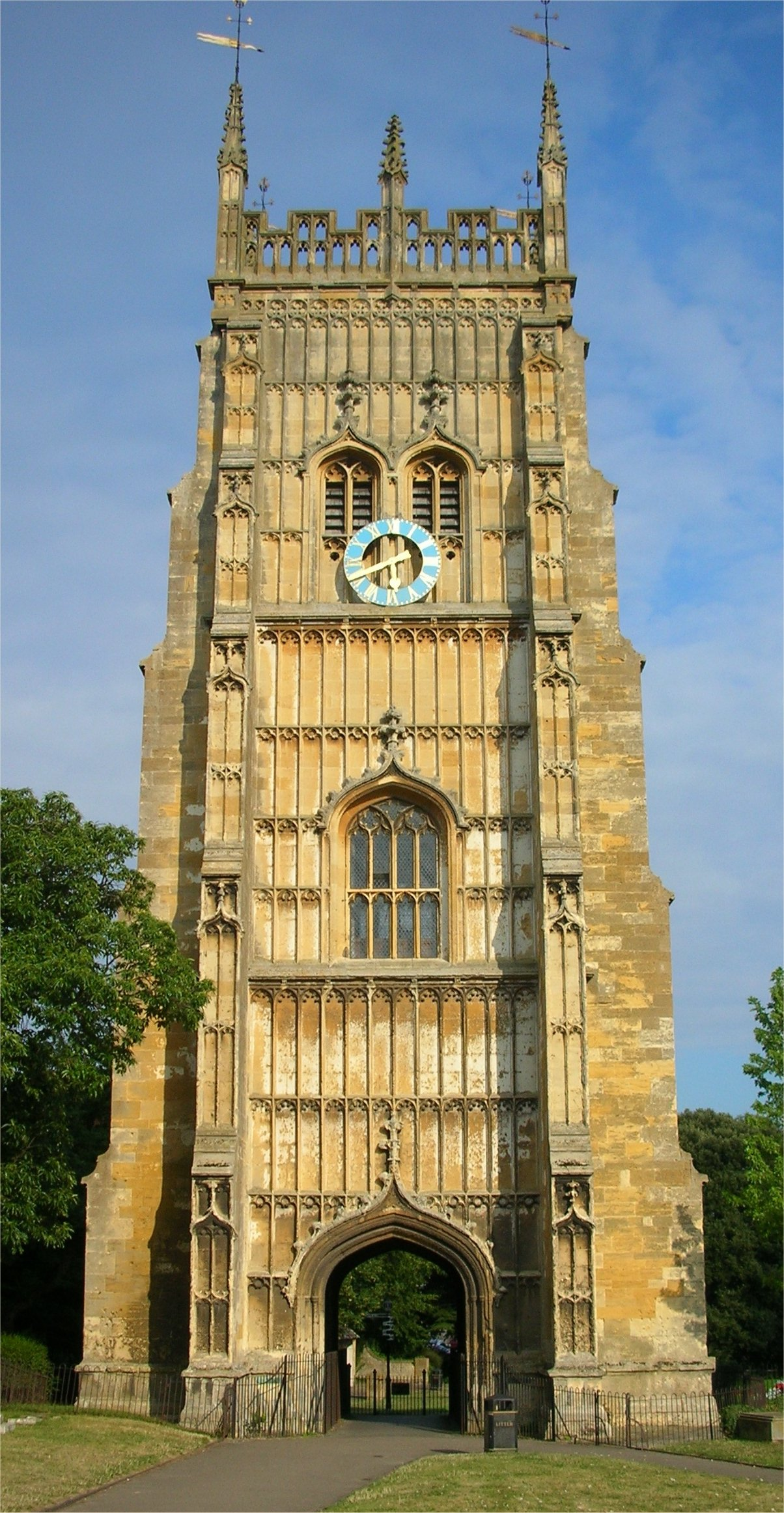
Evesham Abbey bell tower

Dominic of Evesham was a medieval prior of Evesham Abbey in England and writer of religious texts. Probably a native Englishman, there is some confusion about when he became a monk, but by 1104 he was at Evesham and by 1125 he held the office of prior. He is chiefly known for his religious works, including one on the miracles of the Virgin Mary that was an important source for later writings on the subject. Four of his works are still extant.

== Life ==
Little is known of Dominic's life. He was probably a native Englishman, based on some linguistic evidence, although this is not of such strength to make his native English status certain. He was likely born sometime before 1077 and was probably raised around the abbey. J. C. Jennings felt that he may have entered Evesham before 1077, but D. C. Cox, in the Oxford Dictionary of National Biography states that he did not enter the religious life until later than 1077. By 1104, he was a monk at Evesham, as his name appears in a document as a member of the abbey. Sometime before 1125 he became prior of the abbey, as he was named prior in an account of the consecration of Samson as Bishop of Worcester that year. He was still prior after 1130, when he witnessed two charters of Reginald Foliot, then the abbot. He may have witnessed a further charter of Foliot's in 1133, but he had been replaced as prior by 1150. The abbey celebrated his death yearly on 11 October.

== Writings ==
Dominic certainly wrote four works: Vita Sancti Egwini, Vita Sancti Odulfi, Acta Proborum Virorum, and a collection of miracles of the Virgin – Miracula Beatae Virginis Mariae. The Vita Sancti Egwini, or Life of Saint Egwin, was a history of Evesham's founder, St Egwin, and consists of two books. This work became the standard source for Egwin's life in the later Middle Ages, replacing an earlier Life written by Byrhtferth which had been Dominic's source for his first book. The Vita Sancti Odulfi gave a hagiography of St Odulf, a missionary to Brabant whose relics were enshrined at Evesham. The Acta Proborum Virorum was a miscellaneous compilation of tales and legends relating to Evesham Abbey. Dominic's work on the Virgin's miracles is one of the earliest such works. The source for his authoring these works is a 13th-century collection of several of his writings. However, the compiler, Thomas of Marlborough, admitted that he had altered each by both omitting and adding information.

The monastic historian David Knowles felt that the account of Abbot Æthelwig's death that is contained in the Chronicon Abbatiae de Evesham was written by Dominic, not by the main author of the chronicle, Thomas of Marlborough. This is challenged by D. C. Cox, who argues that the writing style is dissimilar to Dominic's and that chronological history was outside the prior's literary interests. Another possible work was a Vita Sancti Wistani (or Life of Saint Wistan), about St Wistan, a Mercian saint whose relics rested at Evesham.

Dominic's main interest seems to have been miracle stories, specifically those connected to his own abbey. His writing style, according to Cox, was "polished" and it has been praised as elegant but clear in meaning. Dominic's most influential work was the one on the miracles of Mary, which besides influencing Thomas of Marlborough, also influenced William of Malmesbury. Dominic's collection, along with William's and another by Anselm, the abbot of Bury St Edmunds Abbey, eventually formed the basis for a new genre of writings that stressed devotion to the Virgin herself, rather than to places or people connected to her.

== Manuscripts and publications ==
The main manuscripts containing Dominic's works are Bodleian MS Rawlinson A.287, Hereford Cathedral Chained Library MS P.7.vi, Balliol MS 240, and Dublin Trinity College MS 167. The Dublin manuscript only has the first book of the Vita Sancti Egwini, while the Hereford manuscript contains both books. The Dublin manuscript also contains the Miracula Beatae Virginis Mariae. The Vita Sancti Odulfi and Acta Proborum Virorum are only known from the copies made by Thomas of Marlborough.

The account of the death of Æthelwig along with the Vitas and the Acta were published in 1863 in the Rolls Series number 29, edited by William Dunn Macray. The Vita Sancti Egwini, edited by Michael Lapidge, has been published in the journal Analecta Bollandiana, which is devoted to the study of hagiography.
