= Mauger of Worcester =

12th and 13th-century Bishop of Worcester

Mauger
- Bishop of Worcester
- Elected: before 23 August 1199
- Term ended: 1 July 1212
- Predecessor: John of Coutances
- Successor: Randulph of Evesham
- Previous post: Archdeacon of Capévreux

Orders
- Consecration: 4 June 1200

Personal details
- Died: 1 July 1212
- Denomination: Catholic

Mauger was a medieval Bishop of Worcester.

Mauger was archdeacon of Capévreux and a royal clerk and physician before he was elected to the see of Worcester before 23 August 1199. His election, however, was quashed by Pope Innocent III because Mauger was illegitimate.

Against this decision he pleaded in person before the pope, who was so favourably impressed by him that he confirmed the election, issued a decretal on his behalf (Innocentii Decretalium Collectio, tit. iv.), and consecrated him at Rome on 4 June 1200. On his return to England he was enthroned at Worcester, and reverently replaced in the church the bones of Bishop Wulfstan, which had been disturbed by his predecessor, Bishop John of Coutances. Many miracles were claimed following this act. On 17 April 1202 the cathedral and other buildings were burnt. Apparently in order to raise funds to repair this disaster, the bishop and monks applied for the canonisation of Wulfstan, and satisfactory proof of the miracles having been given, their request was granted the following year.

Mauger obtained a judgment subjecting the Abbey of Evesham to his jurisdiction, but the judgment was reversed by the pope. In 1207 Pope Innocent wrote to him and to the bishops of London and Ely bidding them urge King John to submit to the see of Rome, threatening him with an interdict, which they were to publish if he would not give way. They had an interview with John, and, their entreaties being in vain, pronounced the interdict on 23 March 1208. After this Mauger fled the kingdom secretly in company with the Bishop of Hereford, and his possessions were confiscated. At the king's bidding he returned with the bishops of London and Ely in the hope of an accommodation, but failed to persuade John, and after eight weeks returned to France.

Innocent sent him and the other two bishops another letter bidding them pronounce the king's excommunication. They hesitated to obey, and sent the letter to the bishops remaining in England. Meanwhile they were blamed by some for having fled, and it was said that they lived in comfort, having left their flocks defenceless. In 1209 Mauger and the bishops of London and Ely were again sent for by the king, who commissioned the chief justiciar, Geoffrey FitzPeter, to arrange a reconciliation. The bishops landed in September, and discussed terms with the justiciar and other magnates at Canterbury. Mauger received back his manors and 100 pounds as an instalment of his losses. As, however, the king would not make full restitution, the negotiations fell through, and he and the two other bishops returned to France. He resided at the abbey at Pontigny, and died there on 1 July 1212, having before his death assumed the monastic habit.

== Citations ==
Catholic Church titles
Preceded by John of Coutances	Bishop of Worcester; 1199–1212	Succeeded by Randulph of Evesham
