= Chronicon Abbatiae de Evesham =

Medieval English chronicle written at Evesham Abbey

- Evesham Chronicle
- Author(s): Thomas of Marlborough; Dominic of Evesham
- Compiled by: Thomas of Marlborough; Dominic of Evesham
- Date: 714–1539
- Provenance: Evesham Abbey

The Chronicon Abbatiae de Evesham or Chronicle of the Abbey of Evesham, sometimes the Evesham Chronicle, is a medieval chronicle written at and about Evesham Abbey in Worcestershire in western England.

== Contents and authorship ==
It covers the history of the abbey from 714 to 1539, and the early sections from 714 to 1214 were probably mostly composed by Thomas of Marlborough, who was abbot from 1230 to 1236. An unknown continuator brought the work down to 1418. The earliest parts of the chronicle concern St. Egwin, and were probably written by a prior of the house, Dominic, sometime before 1125. Egwin was a bishop of Worcester who died in 717. Also included in the Chronicon is a narrative of the translation of the relics of St Odulph, and the life of St Wigstan.

The historian R. R. Darlington felt that the account of Abbot Æthelwig that is part of the chronicle was not written by Thomas, and instead was written shortly after Æthelwig's death, which occurred in 1077 or 1078. The historian David Knowles felt that the account of Æthelwig was written instead by Dominic, but concurred with Darlington that the section was not composed by Thomas. Yet another continuator extended the history of the abbots until 1539.

== Printing history ==
The Chronicon has been printed a number of times, once in 1863 in the Rolls Series, edited by William Dunn Macray. This edition, number 29 in the Rolls Series, is titled Chronicon abbatiae de Evesham, ad annum 1418, but it includes the continuation until 1539. Extracts from the period 1035 to 1236 were edited by Liebermann in the Monumenta Germaniae Historica. Another version, with the continuation down to 1539, was published in 1965 by the Vale of Evesham Historical Society. A new edition with facing translation by Jane Sayers and Leslie Watkiss was published in 2003.

=== Editions ===
- Sayers, Jane and Leslie Watkiss (eds. and trs.). Thomas of Marlborough: History of the Abbey of Evesham. Oxford Medieval Texts. Oxford: Clarendon Press, 2003.
- Macray, W.D. (ed.). Chronicon abbatiae de Evesham, ad annum 1418. Rolls Series 29. London, 1863. [Appendix I: Translation and miracles of St. Odulph, and Life of St Wigstan; Appendix II: Continuation]
