= John of Coutances =

12th-century Bishop of Worcester

- Bishop of Worcester
- Elected: January 1196
- Term ended: September 1198
- Predecessor: Henry de Sully
- Successor: Mauger of Worcester
- Previous post: Archdeacon of Oxford

Orders
- Consecration: 20 October 1196

Personal details
- Died: 24 or 25 September 1198
- Denomination: Catholic

John of Coutances was a medieval Bishop of Worcester.

John was a nephew of Walter of Coutances, Bishop of Lincoln and was treasurer of the diocese of Lisieux before his uncle appointed him Archdeacon of Oxford sometime before December 1184. He also was dean of Rouen, and retained the treasurership of Lisieux while archdeacon.

John was elected in January 1196 and consecrated on 20 October 1196. He died on 24 September 1198 or on 25 September. His death was commemorated on 24 September.

Peter of Blois was commissioned by a Bishop of Worcester, probably John of Coutances to write a significant anti-Judaic treatise Against the Perfidy of Jews around 1190.

John should not be confused with a different John of Coutances who, in the 11th–12th century, wrote a chronicle of the Church at Coutances, France.

== Citations ==
Catholic Church titles
| Preceded by Henry de Sully | Bishop of Worcester; 1196–1198 | Succeeded by Mauger of Worcester |
