= Eof =

Swineherd who claimed to see a vision

Eof (also Eoves) was a swineherd who claimed to have seen a vision of the Virgin Mary at Evesham in England, about 701. Eof related this vision to Egwin, Bishop of Worcester, who founded the great Evesham Abbey on the site of the apparition. Evesham means Eof's ham (homestead).

== Legend ==
The standard Lives, and Saint Egwin and his Abbey of Evesham say Eof was a swineherd. In the legend, Eof encountered three supernaturally beautiful women singing in the woods while he searched for a missing pig. He immediately shared the experience with Bishop Egwin, who returned to the site and also encountered the three women. One of the women carried and book and a gold cross and St. Egwin identified her as the Virgin Mary. According to this legend, this is how the site of Evesham Abbey was selected.

A letter, apparently written by Ecgwin, says "... primum cuidam pastori gregum ...", and the Acta Sanctorum (Lives of the Saints) states something similar: " ...pastores gregum ..." The Latin means either a shepherd or a herdsman. William Dugdale in Monasticon Anglicanum says "Eoves, a herdsman of the bishop ...". George May, the most eminent of Evesham historians, gives both herdsman and swineherd.

The story that Eof was a swineherd goes back at least to William of Malmesbury, writing in the twelfth century. The obverse of the conventual seal of Evesham Abbey clearly shows stylised pigs rather than sheep; the monks of the Abbey clearly thought Eof kept pigs.

The legend of Eof's vision has been commemorated by a bronze statue sited in the town centre paid for by public subscription and created by the British born sculptor John McKenna. The statue was unveiled in a public ceremony that took place on Sunday 15 June 2008.

== Eof vs. Eoves ==
The question of whether the swineherd was named Eof or Eoves is a long-standing question. Writing in 1920, the historian O.G. Knapp argued that the real name of the Swineherd was not Eoves, Eofes, or even Eofa, but Eof.
