= William Dunn Macray =

- Born: 1826; England
- Died: 1916 (aged 89–90); England
- Occupations: Librarian, cleric, historian
- Writing career
- Language: English
- Genre: History

William Dunn Macray (1826–1916) was an English librarian, cleric and historian.

Macray was ordained and graduated MA. He was a Fellow of Magdalen College, Oxford, and worked at the Bodleian Library from 1845 to 1905. He received the degree Doctor of Letters (D.Litt.) honoris causa from the University of Oxford in June 1902.

He is best known for his Annals of the Bodleian Library (1868), an institutional history of the library; a second edition was published in 1890.
