= Egwin of Evesham =

8th-century Benedictine bishop and saint

Saint Egwin OSB
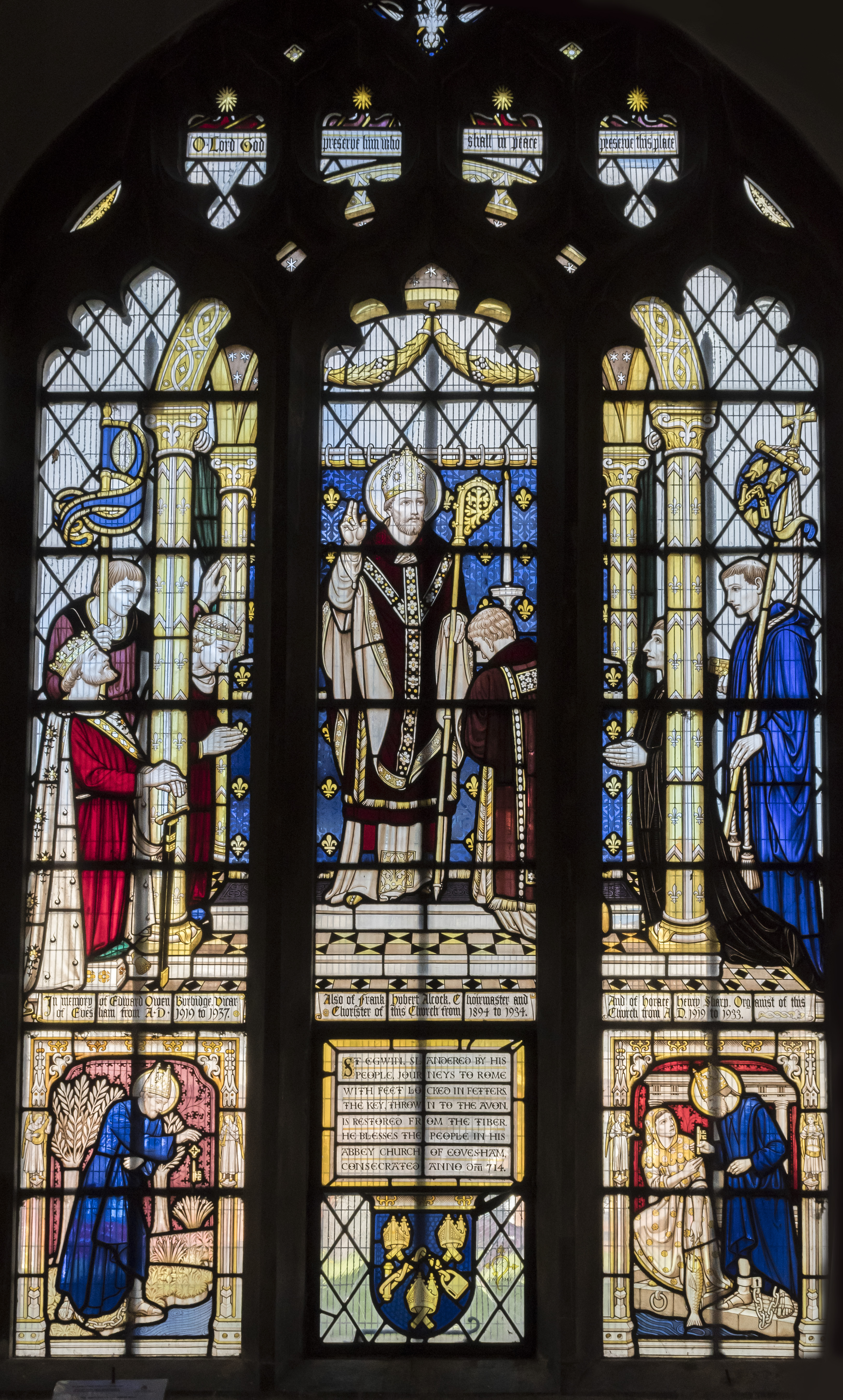
- Scenes from the life of Saint Egwin, St Lawrence's Church, Evesham

Bishop of Worcester Founder of Evesham
- Born: 7th century Worcester, Mercia
- Died: 30 December 717; Evesham Abbey, Mercia
- Venerated in: Catholic Church, Eastern Orthodox Church
- Major shrine: Evesham Abbey
- Feast: 30 December
- Attributes: bishop holding a fish and a key

Egwin of Evesham (Note: Also Ecgwin, Ecgwine and Eegwine) (died 30 December 717) was a Benedictine monk and, later, the third Bishop of Worcester in England. He is venerated as a saint in the Catholic Church and Eastern Orthodox Church.

== Life ==
Egwin was born in Worcester of a noble family, and was a descendant of Mercian kings. He may possibly have been a nephew of King Æthelred of Mercia. Having become a monk, his biographers say that king, clergy, and commoners all united in demanding Egwin's elevation to bishop; but the popularity which led him to the episcopal office dissipated in response to his performance as bishop. He was consecrated bishop after 693.

As a bishop, he was known as a protector of orphans and widows and a fair judge. He struggled with the local population over the acceptance of Christian morality, especially Christian marriage and clerical celibacy. Egwin's stern discipline created a resentment which, as King Æthelred was his friend, eventually found its way to his ecclesiastical superiors. He undertook a pilgrimage to Rome to seek vindication from the pope himself. According to a legend, he prepared for his journey by locking shackles on his feet and throwing the key into the River Avon.

According to one account, as Egwin and his companions were passing through the Alps, they began to thirst. Those among his companions who did not acknowledge the bishop's sanctity asked him, mockingly, to pray for water, as Moses once did in the desert. But others, who did believe in him, rebuked the unbelievers and asked him in a different tone, with true faith and hope. Egwin prostrated himself in prayer. On arising, they saw a pure stream of water gush from the rock.

While he prayed before the tomb of the Apostles in Rome, one of his servants brought him the very key—found in the mouth of a fish that had just been caught in the Tiber. Egwin then released himself from his self-imposed bonds and straight away obtained from the pope an authoritative release from his enemies' obloquy.

Upon his return to England, he founded Evesham Abbey, which became one of the great Benedictine houses of medieval England. It was dedicated to the Virgin Mary, who had reportedly made known to a swineherd named Eof just where a church should be built in her honour.

One of the last important acts of his episcopate was his participation in the first great Council of Clovesho. According to the Benedictine historian, Jean Mabillon, he died on 30 December 720, although his death is generally accepted as having occurred three years earlier on 30 December 717. He died at the abbey he had founded, and his remains were enshrined there.

A hagiography was written by Byrhtferth of Ramsey, a monk at Ramsey Abbey, around 1016. Another Vita Sancti Egwini, was written by Dominic of Evesham, a medieval prior of Evesham Abbey around 1130. His tomb was destroyed, along with the abbey church, at the time of the dissolution of the abbey in 1540.

== Citations ==
Christian titles
Preceded by Oftfor	Bishop of Worcester; 693–717	Succeeded by Wilfrith I
