= Evesham Abbey =

Ruined Benedictine abbey in Worcestershire England

Coordinates: 52°05′29″N 1°56′48″W

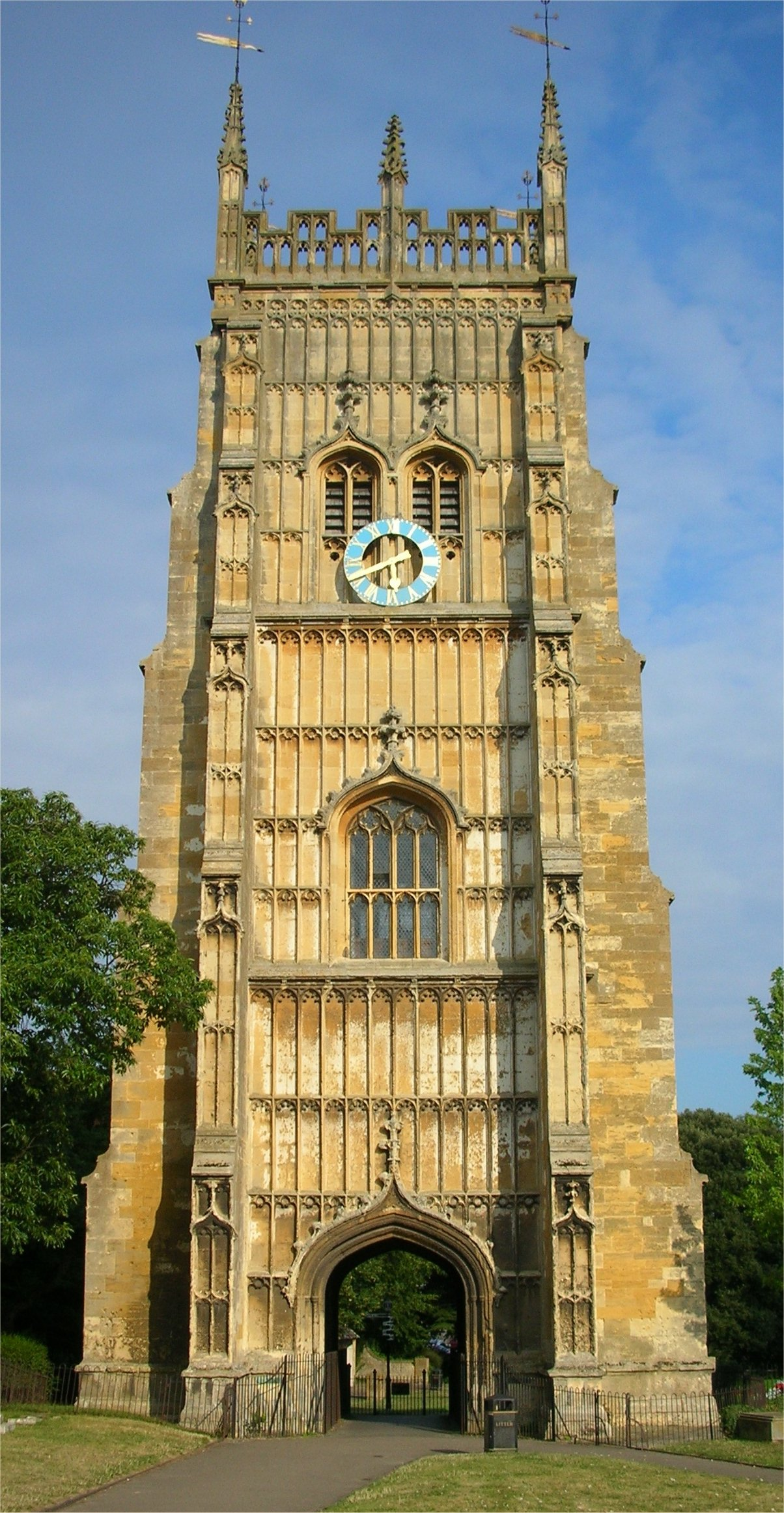
- Evesham Abbey bell tower
- Interactive map of Evesham Abbey

Monastery information
- Order: English Benedictine Congregation
- Denomination: Catholic
- Established: 700; 1326 years ago – 710; 1316 years ago
- Disestablished: 1540; 486 years ago
- Dedication: • Our Lady of Evesham • Saint Eoves • Saint Egwin
- Diocese: Worcester

People
- Founder: Saint Egwin

Architecture
- Functional status: ruined

Site
- Visible remains: Bell tower; Gatehouse; fragments of Chapter House, Almonry, and walls.
- Public access: yes

Evesham Abbey was founded by Saint Egwin at Evesham in Worcestershire, England between 700 and 710 following an alleged vision of the Virgin Mary by a swineherd by the name of Eof.

According to the monastic history, Evesham came through the Norman Conquest unusually well, because of a quick approach by Abbot Æthelwig to William the Conqueror. The abbey is of Benedictine origin, and became in its heyday one of the wealthiest in the country. Simon de Montfort (1208–1265) is buried near the high altar of the ruined abbey, the spot marked by an altar-like memorial monument dedicated by the Archbishop of Canterbury in 1965.

During the 16th-century dissolution of the monasteries, almost all of the abbey was demolished. Today, only one section of walling survives from the abbey itself, although fragments of the 13th-century chapter house, together with the almonry, the 16th-century bell tower and a gateway remain. The abbey's site is a scheduled monument and has several listed structures within it and adjacent to it, of which four are designated at the highest Grade I level.

== Foundation ==
The year of the foundation of the abbey (that is, when a monastic community was first established) is problematic. William Tindal (1794) comments that "I have a MS. but without name or reference, which says that he [i.e. Ecgwine] began his Abbey in the year 682. This is before he was made bishop, and seems improbable. Tanner [Not. Mon. p.168] says in 701. The date of Pope Constantine’s charter may decide the point as to the consecration of his Abbey, but there is reason to suppose that Egwin began to build as early as the year 702". George May gives 701 as the year that Ethelred conferred on Ecgwine the whole peninsula with the erection of the monastery commencing in the same year.

On the other hand, the year of the consecration derives from the grant of the first privilege to the abbey from Pope Constantine "written in the seven hundred and ninth year of our Lord’s incarnation." Ecgwine allegedly returned from Rome bearing this charter, which was apparently read out by Archbishop Berhtwald at a council of "the whole of England" held at Alcester, although that meeting was probably fictitious. Thomas of Marlborough records that, in accordance with the apostolic command, a community of monks was then established (meaning the foundation has also been dated to 709):

"When the blessed Ecgwine saw that longed-for day when the place which he had built would be consecrated, and a monastic order established to serve God in that place, he then abandoned all concerns for worldly matters, and devoted himself to a contemplative way of life. Following the example of the Lord by humbling himself, he resigned his bishop's see, and became abbot of the monastery."

The alleged charter of Ecgwine (purportedly written in 714) records that on the feast of All Saints "Bishop Wilfrid and I consecrated the church which I had built to God, the Blessed Mary, and to all Christ’s elect". The feast of All Saints became established in the West after 609 or 610 under Pope Boniface IV; its observance on 1 November dates from the time of Pope Gregory III (died 741). A Bishop Wilfrid was Egwin’s successor to the see of Worcester (though he is sometimes confused with Wilfrid, Bishop of York, who died c. 709).

Although the exact year of the foundation remains unclear, it has sometimes been assumed that the date of the abbey's consecration was the feast of All Saints in 709. That the consecration occurred on this feast day would provide a neat connection with All Saints' Church in Evesham. That Abbot Clement Lichfield lies buried beneath the Chantry Chapel, now known as the Lichfield Chapel in consequence, provides a link to the closing days of the life of the abbey.

== Surviving structures ==
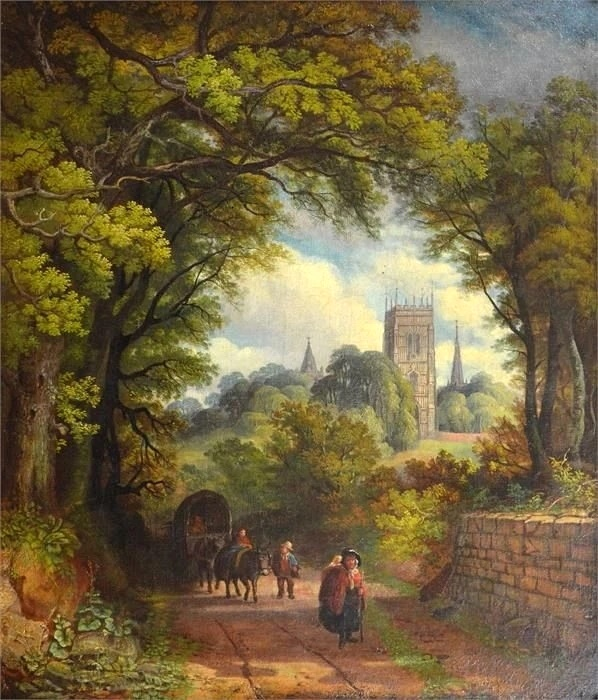
A view over the river to the abbey's tower, a 19th century oil painting

During the dissolution of the monasteries, on its surrender to the king in 1540 the abbey was plundered and razed to the ground, although the bell tower built earlier that century was saved. The tower stands 110 feet (34 m) tall and is a Grade I listed building. Other remains include:

- The abbey's almonry, from the 15th century and earlier, Grade I listed, has been restored and houses the Almonry Museum and Heritage Centre
- The L-shaped house which is now numbers 53 and 54, Merstow Green, incorporates the abbey's Great Gate from the early 14th century and a vaulted passage from the same period; Grade I listed
- Abbot Reginald's gateway and wall, c.1120 with 15th-century room above; Grade I listed
- Part of the south wall of the abbey precinct, restored, including an arched doorway
- A 13th-century archway which led to the chapter house
- Fragmentary remains of the west wall of the north transept of the abbey
- A wall, blocked arches and a window which are the remains of the abbey stables, 14th and 15th centuries; Grade II* listed

The full area of the abbey precincts, most of which is today a public park, was designated as a scheduled monument in 1949. As of 2022, the site in general and in particular the almonry and Abbot Reginald's wall, are on Historic England's Heritage at Risk register owing to their vulnerable condition.

Other buildings linked to the history of the abbey include Middle Littleton tythe barn.

== Relics of saints ==
- Saint Egwin, third bishop of Worcester and founder of Evesham Abbey
- Saint Credan, abbot of the abbey during the reign of King Offa of Mercia
- Saint Wigstan of Mercia (aka Wulstan and Wystan)
- Saint Odulf, a Frisian saint and missionary (d. 855) recorded in the Hagiographies of Secgan, 'Saint Ecgwine', and hagiography of St Odulf, the Ave presul gloriose Augustine psalter, and Chronicon Abbatiae de Evesham

== Other burials ==
- Simon de Montfort, 6th Earl of Leicester
- Henry de Montfort
- Hugh le Despencer, 1st Baron le Despencer
- Robert de Stafford
- Thomas of Marlborough

== Prints and paintings ==
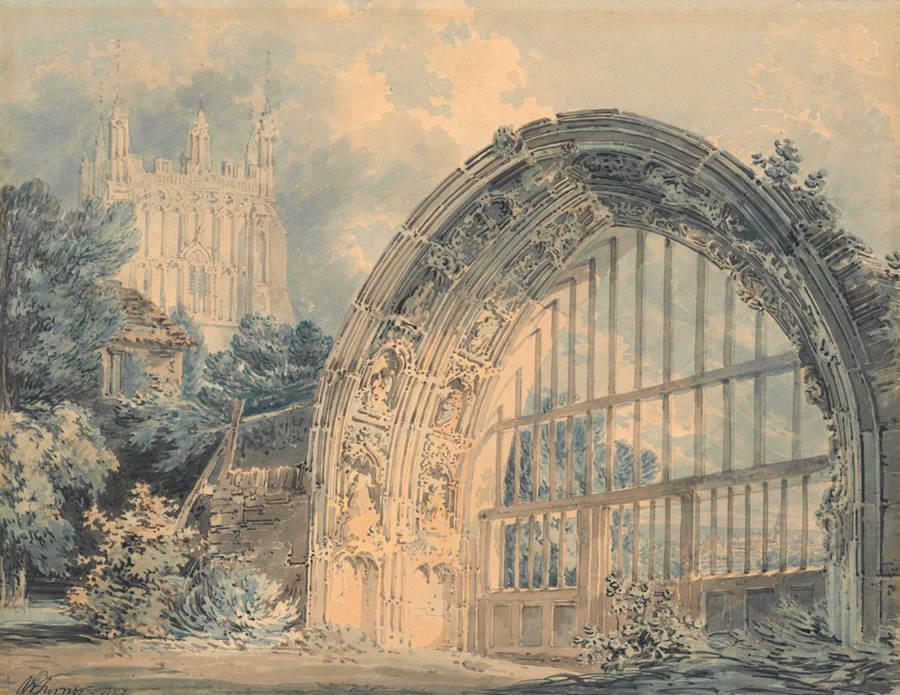
J. M. W. Turner’s watercolour of the old abbey gateway, 1793

Prints of picturesque ruins accompanied the growth of domestic tourism in Britain during the second half of the 18th century, among which can be found striking images of the remains of the abbey walls and bell tower at Evesham. These, accompanied by scenic and historical descriptions, were collected, for example, in such works as Francis Grose's Antiquities of England and Wales (1786) and, more particularly, Samuel Ireland's Picturesque Views on the Upper or Warwickshire Avon (1795). Among the visiting artists who came to paint them was J. M. W. Turner, who in 1793 made pen and wash studies of the abbey gateway and of the Church of St Laurence seen through the bell tower's arch. An anonymous artist of the period also left a panorama of the tower and churches behind it as seen from the river.

In the following century, the antiquary Edward Rudge began excavations of the abbey remains on parts of his property, between 1811 and 1834. The results were given to the Society of Antiquaries of London; illustrations of the discoveries were published in their Vetusta Monumenta with a memoir by his son, Edward John Rudge and illustrations by his wife, Anne Rudge.

== Clock and carillon ==
A new clock and carillon by Gillett, Bland and Company of Croydon was installed in 1878. The hours were struck on a bell of 36 long hundredweight (1,800 kg) with a hammer of 80 pounds (36 kg). The Westminster chimes on four other bells. The external dials were 10 feet (3.0 m) in diameter. The clock mechanism sat on a cast iron frame with a double three-legged Gravity escapement invented by Edmund Beckett, 1st Baron Grimthorpe. The pendulum was made of zinc and iron tubes to compensate for temperature changes. The whole machinery had a weight of over one ton. The carillon machine was based on the design for that installed in Worcester Cathedral a few years earlier. The tunes played every three hours day and night with a different tune for each day of the week.

- Sunday – "Bedford" (No. 153 Hymns Ancient and Modern)
- Monday – "There is nae luck aboot the hoose"
- Tuesday – "Barbara Allen"
- Wednesday – "Drink to me only with thine eyes"
- Thursday – "Bailiff's Daughter of Islington"
- Friday – "My lodging is on the cold ground"
- Saturday – "Home, sweet home"

The mechanism included an apparatus to pull the hammers off the bells simultaneously to allow the bells to be rung by hand, and also a manual keyboard to allow tunes to be played by a musician. The cost of the clock and carillon was around £2,000 (equivalent to £205,800 in 2025).

== Conservation ==
Evesham Abbey Trust, a charity and charitable incorporated organisation registered in 2016, aims to conserve, preserve and improve the abbey site and environs. Since May 2017, the trust owns the freehold of much of the site following its gifting by the Rudge family. The trust in 2019 obtained over £1m of funding from the National Lottery Heritage Fund, Historic England and other local and regional funders to begin the conservation and restoration of the abbey walls and the creation of a set of interpretive gardens. The work was completed in 2023.

== Commemoration ==
One of the Great Western Railway Star class locomotives was named Evesham Abbey and numbered 4065. It was subsequently rebuilt as a Castle class locomotive, being renumbered as 5085 while retaining the name Evesham Abbey.

== See also ==
- Abbot of Evesham, for a list of abbots
- Worcester Cathedral
- Chronicle of Evesham Abbey

== Bibliography ==
- Thomas of Marlborough (c.1190–1236) History of the Abbey of Evesham Ed. and trans. by Jane Sayers and Leslie Watkiss, Oxford University Press ISBN 978-0-19-820480-0, ISBN 0-19-820480-9
- Cox, David, The Church and Vale of Evesham 700-1215: Lordship, Landscape and Prayer Boydell Press, 2015. ISBN 978-1-78327-077-4.
- Evesham Abbey and the Parish Churches: A Guide
- Evesham Abbey and Local Society in the Late Middle Ages: The Abbot's Household Account 1456–7 and the Priors' Registers 1520–40, ed. David Cox, Worcestershire Historical Society, new ser. 30, 2021
- Walker, John A., Selection of curious articles from the Gentleman's magazine, vol. 1, 1811, Chap. LXXXV, Historical Account of the Abbey of Evesham, pp. 334–342. Accessed 31 July 2012.
