= Bengeworth railway station =

Former railway station in Worcestershire, England

Bengeworth
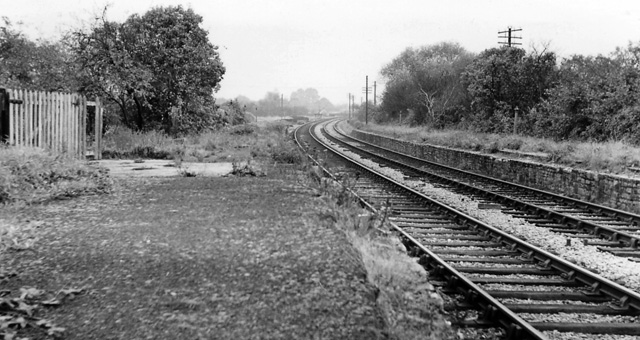
- Bengeworth railway station in 1960

General information
- Location: Hampton, Worcestershire; England
- Coordinates: 52.0856°N 1.9615°W
- Grid reference: SP027430
- Platforms: 2

Other information
- Status: Disused

History
- Original company: Midland Railway
- Pre-grouping: Midland Railway
- Post-grouping: London, Midland and Scottish Railway

Key dates
- 1 October 1864: Opened
- 8 June 1953: Closed
Location

Bengeworth railway station was a station on the Midland Railway between Ashchurch and Evesham. The precise location of the station was not in the Evesham suburb of Bengeworth itself, but one mile (2 km) away in Great Hampton. The station was named Bengeworth in order to avoid confusion over other stations in the area which also included Hampton in their names.

The station opened in 1864 and closed in 1953, but trains continued to use the line until closure in 1964. Some of the land between Hinton on the Green and south of Bengeworth station was given over to housing. The bridge that crossed the main A44 Pershore Road north of the station was removed, and the track bed beyond the road is now used as an access road to the nearby water treatment works.

== Location ==
Bengeworth station was located on the Midland Railway's line from Ashchurch to Barnt Green via Evesham and Redditch, between the stations of Evesham and Hinton. It was located in the village of Great Hampton, to the south of the Evesham–Pershore road which was previously part of the A44 and is now part of the B4084. The station was around one mile (2 km) to the west of the village Bengeworth, and its eponymous bridge across the River Avon into Evesham.

== History ==
The route between Birmingham and Bristol was completed by 1844 by the Birmingham and Gloucester, both of which became part of the Midland Railway (MR) in 1845. Because the route chosen missed several large towns in the area, notably Redditch, Evesham and Alcester, and the MR wanted a diversionary route to be available, a new loop line was constructed through those towns in 1859–1868, running between Ashchurch and Barnt Green. Bengeworth was one of the fourteen new stations constructed along the line, opening on 1 October 1864. It was reported in the local press at the time of opening that the station was to be named "Bengeworth, for Hampton", although later references only include the name Bengeworth. The decision was made to name the station Bengeworth rather than Hampton or Great Hampton, in order to avoid confusion over other stations on the Midland Railway network which also included Hampton in their names. Contemporary newspapers noted that this decision had caused "some offence" to people living in Hampton.

The station and line eventually came under the control of the London, Midland & Scottish Railway, under the Grouping of 1921, and then passed into the Western Region of British Railways under nationalisation in 1948. In 1952, British Railways proposed to close Bengeworth Station, because there was little usage by that time, and goods traffic was minimal. The railway authorities argued that buses already covered much of the route and that concentrating services at Evesham would be more efficient and cost-effective. Despite opposition by local councillors, especially those representing Hampton, the closure went ahead the closure went ahead with the last services calling at the station on 8 June 1953.

In late 1953, the station site was repurposed as a depot for vehicles used by the British Road Services. In 1964–65, the entire Ashchurch–Barnt Green line was closed and the track lifted. The site of Bengeworth station is now occupied by housing, the Hampton road Chestnut Close lying on the site. The bridge that crossed the main A44 Pershore Road north of the station was removed, and the track bed beyond the road is now used as an access road to the nearby water treatment works.

== Services ==
Preceding station	Disused railways	Following station
Hinton; Line and station closed	London, Midland and Scottish Railway; Evesham loop line	Evesham; Line closed, station open
