= Sedgeberrow =

Village in Worcestershire, England, near Evesham

Coordinates: 52.047°N 1.966°W

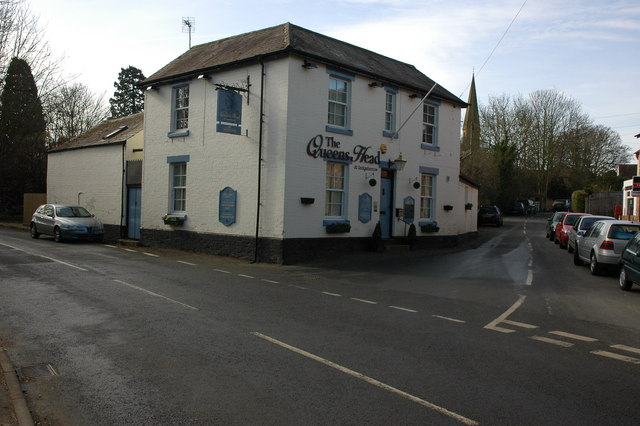
- The Queens Head

- Location within Worcestershire
- OS grid reference: SP0238
- Civil parish: Sedgeberrow
- District: Wychavon
- Shire county: Worcestershire
- Region: West Midlands
- Country: England
- Sovereign state: United Kingdom
- Post town: Evesham
- Postcode district: WR11
- Dialling code: 01386
- Police: West Mercia
- Fire: Hereford and Worcester
- Ambulance: West Midlands
- UK Parliament: Mid Worcestershire
- Website: Sedgeberrow Parish Council

Sedgeberrow is a village and civil parish in the Wychavon district of Worcestershire, England, about 3 miles (4.8 km) south of Evesham. It stands beside the River Isbourne, a tributary of the River Avon.

== History ==
The name Sedgeberrow derives from the Old English Secgbearu meaning 'Secg's grove'.

The Toponymy has evolved through forms including Secgesbearawe in the 10th century, Seggesbereg or Shegeberwe in the 13th century and Seggeberugh in the 14th century. Other forms of the name from different periods are cited in the course of the history of the manor.

Sedgeberrow is an ancient manor. In AD 777 King Offa of Mercia granted Segcgesbearuue or Secgesbearuue to King Ealdred, of Hwicce, which was part of the Kingdom of Mercia. Ealdred in turn granted Sedgeberrow to the Bishop of Worcester. In 1086 the Domesday Book recorded that Seggesbarwe was held by the monks of Worcester Priory. In 1539-40 the Crown dissolved the Priory and in 1542 it granted Segebarowe to the Dean and Chapter of Worcester Cathedral. After the English Civil War the Commonwealth of England sold off Sedgborowe manor house in 1651 and its lands in 1654. In 1660 the Stuart monarchy was restored and Sedgeberrow was restored to the Dean and Chapter. In 1859 the manor was transferred to the Ecclesiastical Commissioners, who continued to hold it until the 20th century.

The Church of England parish church of Saint Mary the Virgin was consecrated in 1331. It has a small western bell tower with a spire and three bells. The oldest was cast in 1623 by Godwin Baker of Worcester, the next by Henry Bagley of Chacombe in 1665 and the last by Abraham Rudhall of Gloucester in 1718. The church was restored in 1868 and a vestry was added in 1900, but its original 14th-century form is largely unchanged. The parish is now part of the Benefice of Hampton with Sedgeberrow and Hinton-on-the-Green.

A 17th century half-timbered cottage in the southern part of the village includes the remains of an earlier stone building. The remains include two gothic windows, from which the authors of the Victoria County History concluded that the building was probably a chapel.

After the dissolution of the monasteries, Worcester Priory's manor house in Sedgeberrow was demolished and a half-timbered court house was built on the site. A chimney stack on one side of the house bears the date 1572. Several half-timbered cottages in the village from the 17th century also survive.

Sedgeberrow is on the main road between Evesham and Cheltenham. In the 18th century this road was improved as the Cleeve and Evesham Turnpike. In 1923 the road was classified as part of the A435. More recently the part of the A435 between Teddington, Gloucestershire and Alcester has been reclassified as part of the A46 road. The main road now passes Sedgeberrow on a bypass slightly north of the village, crossing the Isbourne on a new bridge.

On 20 July 2007 the Isbourne burst its banks and flooded the village. The Environment Agency has flood defences for the village but they were overwhelmed. There was an estimated £1 worth of damage.

== Amenities ==
Sedgeberrow has a Church of England First School.

The village has a public house, the Queen's Head. In 2007 It was acquired by the Hook Norton Brewery.

Sedgeberrow has a Women's Institute that meets at the village hall. Although the village has always been in Worcestershire, the WI belongs to the Gloucestershire Federation of Women's Institutes.

== Sources ==
- Victoria County History: A History of the County of Worcester: Volume 3. 1913. pp. 518–521.
