= Bengeworth =

Coordinates: 52.083333°N 1.933333°W

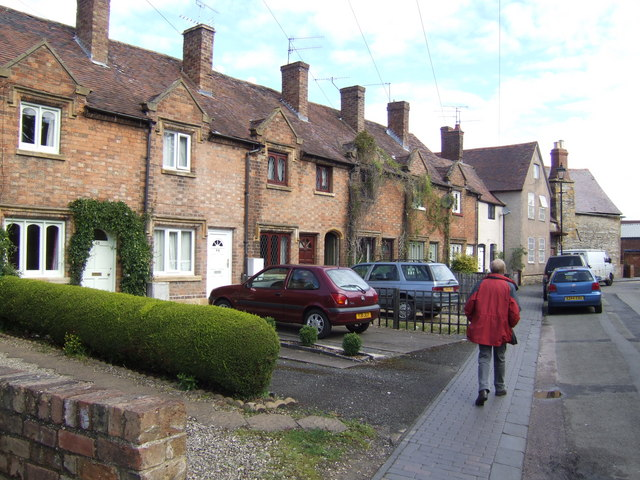

- Location within Worcestershire
- OS grid reference: SP045430
  - London: 88 miles (142 km)
- Civil parish: Evesham
- District: Wychavon
- Shire county: Worcestershire
- Region: West Midlands
- Country: England
- Sovereign state: United Kingdom
- Post town: EVESHAM
- Postcode district: WR11
- Dialling code: 01386
- Police: West Mercia
- Fire: Hereford and Worcester
- Ambulance: West Midlands

Bengeworth is a locality in the civil parish of Evesham, in the Wychavon district, in the county of Worcestershire, England. In 1887 it had a population of 1,311. Today it has a school and an Anglican church.

== History ==
Bengeworth was an early hamlet in one of the three Anglo-Saxon hundreds (Cuthburgelow, Winburgetreow and Wulfereslaw) that were combined to form the triple hundred of Oswaldslow, located across the River Avon from the town of Evesham. The etymology indicates that Bengeworth may have been a named location in Anglo-Saxon England as early as the Kingdom of the Hwicce, which was subsumed into the Kingdom of Mercia. From 927, the Kingdom of England ruled the land.

Prior to the Conquest of 1066, Bengeworth was in the triple hundred of Oswaldslow, owned by Evesham Abbey and the Bishop of Worcester. Due to prompt intercession by the abbot, Evesham Abbey was not reduced by William the Conqueror. By 1086, Evesham Abbey owned the entirety of Bengeworth (scribed in Domesday once as Beningeorde (cf. Old English: ben (petition, prayer) + ing (pasture) (perhaps heard by the Domesday scribe as Old French: bening = benign, good – from Latin benignus); Old English: eorðe = earth, ground) and once as Bennieworte (cf. Anglo-Saxon: bene = prayer; worð = land, farm, street, public way)), a larger than average hamlet whose inhabitants were a mixture of free, serf and slave. Beningwyrde is another early spelling used in the Worcester Survey, a land survey undertaken in Worcestershire sometime between 1108 and 1118.

Wulfstan II of Worcester, the last surviving pre-Conquest bishop, held the office in 1086 according to the Domesday Book. When Walter de Beauchamp built a castle in Bengeworth on the north end of the bridge to Evesham, conflict with the Abbot of Evesham escalated. Following his attack upon Evesham, Beauchamp was excommunicated and his Bengeworth castle destroyed. His descendant William Beauchamp of Elmley was said to have withdrawn his part of Bengeworth from the bishop's hundred about the middle of the 13th century, and in 1280 all of Bengeworth was in Blackenhurst hundred.

The Bishops of Worcester continued to exert sac and soc over Bengeworth and other communities in Oswaldslow Hundred until the Dissolution of the Monasteries in the 16th century, six to eight centuries of Catholic ecclesiastical rule. The English Reformation led to the development of the Anglican church in Bengeworth.

The lordship of Bengeworth was retained by a series of families from 1535 onward through the Victorian era. Rebecca Rushout (née Bowles), Lady Northwick, held the manor in 1810.

The 1605 charter of the Borough of Evesham added the Parish of Bengeworth within its boundary, superseding the initial 1604 borough charter which had encompassed the parishes of All Saints and St. Lawrence. Over the next two centuries, the population of Bengeworth expanded to the north and east, while Evesham expanded to the north and west.

The inhabitants of Bengeworth and nearby Evesham were deeply involved in the English Civil War in the early 17th century. Five Parliamentarian soldiers who participated in the horror of the war became convinced of the pacifist theology of the Society of Friends, and met for religious meetings in 1655 at the home of Thomas Cartwright in Bengeworth. Their beliefs greatly disturbed the mainstream religious and secular authorities, which caused their persecution.

The medieval Anglican church was demolished in 1870. It was replaced by Bengeworth St. Peter, a large church designed in the Gothic Decorated style by Thomas Denville Barry and his son Charles Garret Barry, of the firm T. D. Barry and Sons of Liverpool, and built between 1870/72. The architect John Henry Price first articled at their firm 1884–1888. William Blews & Sons of New Bartholomew Street, Birmingham, cast the church bells.

In 1921 the civil parish had a population of 3268. On 1 April 1924 the parish was abolished and merged with Evesham.

The Bengeworth Post Office was forced to close, which led to protests in 2008.

== Schools ==
In the late 18th century, free schooling in Bengeworth was charitably endowed through donations and bequests of South Sea Stock and South Sea Annuities from investors who had profited from the restructured South Sea Company. John Deacle's Charity funded the purchase of land and construction of a school in Bengeworth.

The Bengeworth CE Academy had to suspend classroom instruction and begin a home learning program for its students on 20 March 2020 to aid the nationwide effort to decrease the rate of transmission of COVID-19.

== Railways ==
It was served by the nearby Bengeworth railway station on the Gloucester Loop Line on the Midland Railway between Ashchurch and Evesham. Bengeworth railway station was not in Bengeworth, but rather was the station in the centre in the nearby village of Hampton. The railway station was called 'Bengeworth' as that was considered a distinctive name, while 'Hampton' is a common England village name.

The station opened 1 October 1864. It closed in 1953, but trains continued to use the line until closure in 1963.
