= Ashton under Hill =

Village in Worcestershire, England, near Evesham

Coordinates: 52.04°N 2.01°W

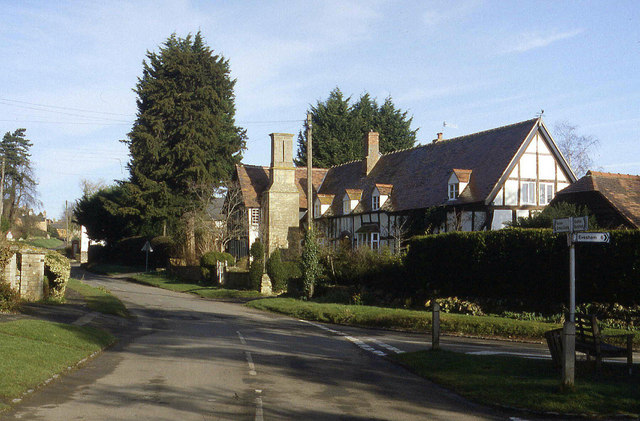

- Location within Worcestershire
- Population: 747 (2001)
- OS grid reference: SO974379
  - London: 90 miles (140 km)
- Civil parish: Ashton Under hill
- District: Wychavon
- Shire county: Worcestershire
- Region: West Midlands
- Country: England
- Sovereign state: United Kingdom
- Post town: EVESHAM
- Postcode district: WR11
- Dialling code: 01386
- Police: West Mercia
- Fire: Hereford and Worcester
- Ambulance: West Midlands
- UK Parliament: West Worcestershire

Ashton under Hill is a village and civil parish in the Wychavon district of Worcestershire in England. It is situated at the foot of Bredon Hill. According to the 2001 census the parish had a population of 743. It is located about six miles south-west of Evesham. A five-house hamlet named Paris is located above the village with panoramic views over the surrounding hills.

== History ==
Historically part of Gloucestershire, it was transferred to Worcestershire under the Provisional Order Confirmation (Gloucestershire, Warwickshire and Worcestershire) Act 1931.

The village church, St Barbara's is dedicated to St Barbara who is alleged to afford protection from lightning strikes. In 2005, villagers celebrated the 900th anniversary of the church.

The author Fred Archer lived in Ashton at Stanley's Farm. He wrote a series of popular books about tales of country life. The books described life in the village between the years 1876 and 1939.

=== Railways ===
Ashton-under-Hill railway station belonged to the Midland Railway (later part of the LMS). It was situated on a lengthy loop line, Gloucester Loop Line branching off the Birmingham and Gloucester Railway main line at Ashchurch, passing through Evesham railway station, Alcester and Redditch, and rejoining the main line at Barnt Green, near Bromsgrove. The loop was built to address the fact that the main line bypassed most of the towns it might otherwise have served, but it took three separate companies to complete.

The loop officially closed between Ashchurch and Redditch in June 1963, but poor condition of the track had brought about withdrawal of all trains between Evesham and Redditch earlier, in October 1962, being replaced by a bus service for the final eight months. Redditch to Barnt Green remains open on the electrified Birmingham suburban network.

Ashton under Hill station house still stands as a private residence.

== Schools ==
The schools Bredon Hill Academy and Ashton under Hill First are located in Ashton under Hill. Both schools have received an Ofsted rating of "outstanding".

Ashton is located near the Bredon Hill satellite villages of Conderton, Beckford, Elmley Castle, Overbury and Kemerton.
