= River Isbourne =

River in Gloucestershire and Worcestershire, England

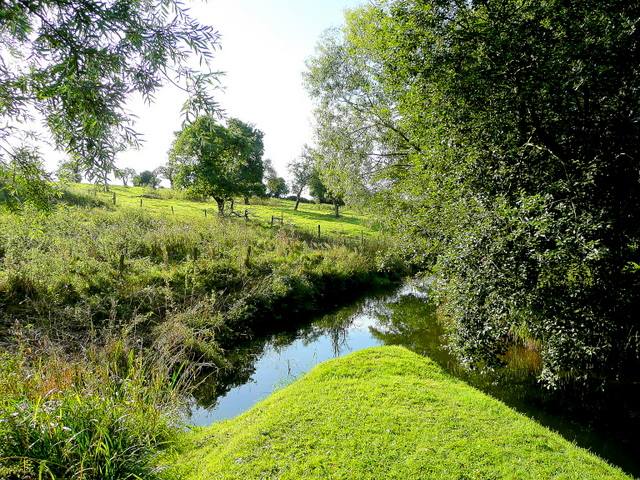
- River Isbourne near Hinton-on-the-Green

- River Isbourne - showing source in Gloucestershire and mouth in Worcestershire

Location
- Country: United Kingdom
- Country within the UK: England
- Counties: Gloucestershire, Worcestershire
- Towns: Winchcombe, Evesham

Physical characteristics
- Source: Cleeve Hill
  - location: Cotswolds, Gloucestershire
  - coordinates: 51.9346°N 2.0072°W
- Mouth: Confluence with the Avon
  - location: Hampton, Worcestershire
  - coordinates: 52.0862°N 1.9564°W
- Length: 22 km (14 mi)
- Basin size: 95 km^{2} (37 sq mi)
- Discharge
  - location: Hinton-on-the-Green
  - average: 0.66 m^{3}/s (23 cu ft/s)
  - maximum: 86 m^{3}/s (3,000 cu ft/s)

Basin features
- Tributaries
  - right: Laverton Brook

The River Isbourne is a 14 mile (22 km) long tributary of the River Avon which flows through Gloucestershire and Worcestershire in the Midlands of England.

== Course ==
The source of the river is a series of springs that occur on the northern flank of Cleeve Hill, on the edge of the Cotswold Hills. These springs occur where the permeable Jurassic limestone, meets the impermeable Upper Lias mudstone and clays that underlie most of the Isbourne catchment.

The river flows from Cleeve Hill in a steep valley in a northerly direction through the hamlet of Postlip, before reaching the town of Winchcombe which it passes along its eastern side. Beyond the town, it continues northwards to Toddington, through the grounds of Toddington Manor, and then past the village of Wormington. The river then crosses into Worcestershire and is joined by the Laverton brook, before it reaches the village of Sedgeberrow. Flowing directly north the Isbourne passes through the village of Hinton on the Green, it then continues through an area of market gardens on the outskirts of Evesham, and passes under the Pershore road, before joining the River Avon near Hampton.

== Catchment ==
The Isbourne catchment covers an area of 95 square kilometres (37 sq mi) and lies between the Badsey Brook to the east, the Merry Brook and Carrant Brook to the west with the Cotswolds to the south. It has an average annual rainfall of 704 millimetres (27.7 in), which is somewhat drier than the average for England at 828 millimetres (32.6 in).

Land use in the catchment is predominantly rural, with 80 per cent made up from a mixture of arable, horticulture and pasture; the remainder being woodland, with a minor fraction of urbanised area of less than 2 per cent.

In terms of geology, apart from the headwaters which are underlain by the Cotswold limestone, the majority of catchment is Lias clay. This impermeable clay means that Isbourne can become responsive in terms of runoff to heavy rainfall events.

== Flooding ==
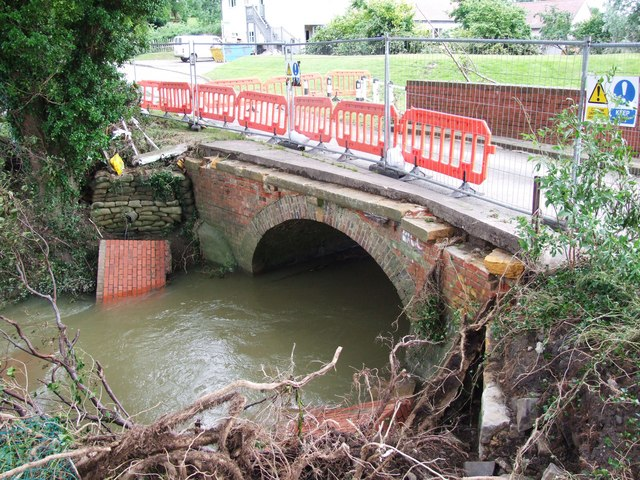
Damage to the roadbridge across the Isbourne near Hinton-on-the-Green after 2007 floods

The Isbourne has a history of flooding along its course, especially in Sedgeberrow, the most recent occasion being in summer 2007.
