= Beckford railway station =

Former railway station in Worcestershire, England

Beckford
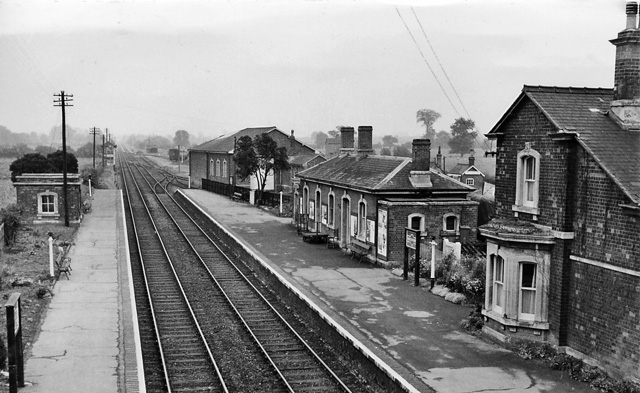
- Beckford railway station in 1960

General information
- Location: Beckford, Worcestershire; England
- Coordinates: 52.0188°N 2.0294°W
- Grid reference: SO980355
- Platforms: 2

Other information
- Status: Disused

History
- Original company: Evesham and Redditch Railway
- Pre-grouping: Midland Railway
- Post-grouping: London, Midland and Scottish Railway

Key dates
- 1 October 1864: Opened
- 17 June 1963: Closed to passengers
- 1 July 1963: Closed
Location

Beckford railway station was a station on the Midland Railway between Great Malvern and Evesham.

It was designed by architect George Hunt, opened 1 October 1864, and closed in 1963. The station served Beckford, Worcestershire.

Preceding station	Disused railways	Following station
Ashchurch; Line closed, station open	Midland Railway; Evesham loop line	Ashton-under-Hill; Line and station closed
