= Ashton-under-Hill railway station =

Former railway station in Worcestershire, England

Ashton-under-Hill
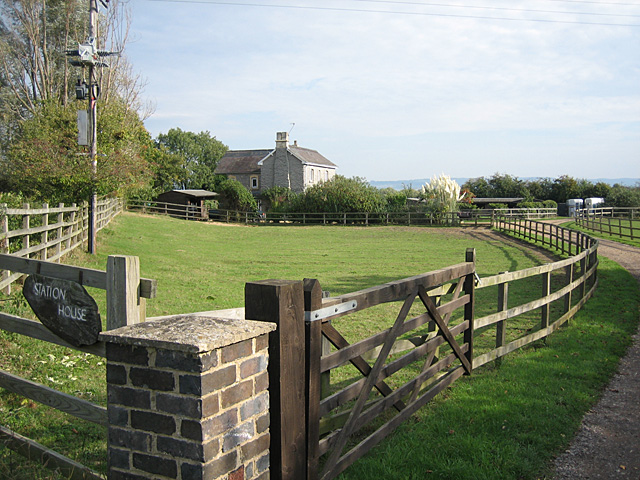

General information
- Location: Ashton under Hill, Wychavon, Worcestershire; England
- Coordinates: 52.0377°N 1.9955°W
- Grid reference: SP003377
- Platforms: 2

Other information
- Status: Disused

History
- Original company: Midland Railway
- Pre-grouping: Midland Railway
- Post-grouping: London Midland and Scottish Railway

Key dates
- 1 October 1864: Opened
- 17 June 1963: Closed
Location

Ashton-under-Hill railway station was a station on the Midland Railway between Great Malvern and Evesham. It served Ashton under Hill in Worcestershire.

== History ==
Opened by the Midland Railway, it became part of the London, Midland and Scottish Railway during the Grouping of 1923. The station then passed to the London Midland Region of British Railways on nationalisation in 1948. It was then closed by the British Railways Board in 1963.

Preceding station	Disused railways	Following station
Beckford; Line and station closed	Midland Railway; Evesham loop line	Hinton; Line and station closed
