= Hinton railway station (England) =

Former railway station in Worcestershire, England

Hinton
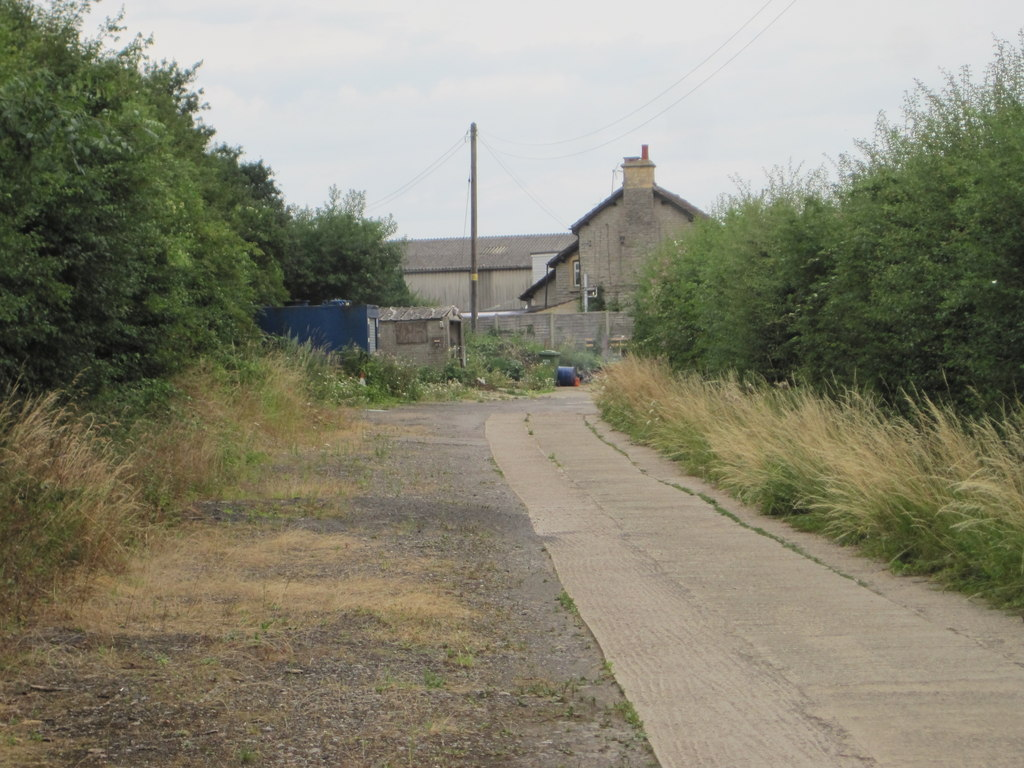
- Site of Hinton railway station

General information
- Location: Hinton-on-the-Green, Worcestershire; England
- Coordinates: 52.0621°N 1.9748°W
- Grid reference: SP018404
- Platforms: 2

Other information
- Status: Disused

History
- Original company: Midland Railway
- Pre-grouping: Midland Railway
- Post-grouping: London, Midland and Scottish Railway

Key dates
- 1 October 1864: Opened
- 17 June 1963: Closed to passengers
- 1 July 1963: Closed
Location

Hinton railway station was a station on the Midland Railway between Tewkesbury and Evesham, England. It opened 1 October 1864 by the Midland Railway. The station served Hinton-on-the-Green in Worcestershire.

During World War II, the area surrounding the station was used as a military fuel dump and it was subject to at least one unsuccessful air attack. Following the station's closure in 1963, the area was used by several companies for storage including the local Midlands Electricity Board who used it to store electrical mains equipment.

| Preceding station | Disused railways | Following station |
|---|---|---|
| Ashton-under-Hill; Line and station closed | Midland Railway; Evesham Loop Line | Bengeworth; Line and station closed |
