= Fladbury =

Village in Worcestershire, England

Coordinates: 52.115449°N 2.008589°W

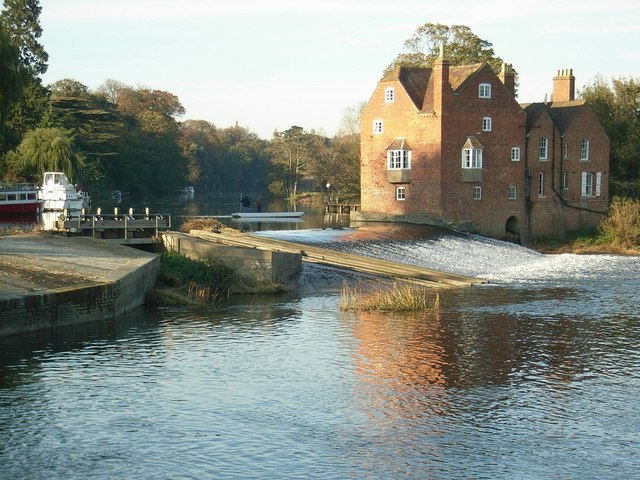
- River Avon and Cropthorne Mill, looking from the Nait in Fladbury

- Location within Worcestershire
- Population: 923 (2021 mid-year estimate)
- District: Wychavon
- Shire county: Worcestershire
- Region: West Midlands
- Country: England
- Sovereign state: United Kingdom
- Post town: Pershore
- Postcode district: WR10
- Dialling code: 01386
- UK Parliament: Droitwich and Evesham

Fladbury is a village and civil parish located in the Wychavon district of Worcestershire, England, located five miles from Pershore and 5 miles from Evesham, It is on the banks of the River Avon, with many interesting and original buildings and features. The village was mentioned in the Domesday Book of 1086, almost 1,000 years ago. Cropthorne village is on the opposite bank of the Avon. The two ancient communities are linked by the Jubilee Bridge.

== History ==
A Beaker settlement was discovered in the centre of Fladbury during excavations into Saxon occupation. Excavations of the Beaker site took place from 1932 to 1941.

There are the remains of a Roman polyfocal farmstead settlement with prehistoric origins on the site of the current Spring Hill Farm.

The local soil is mostly light clay with a little sand; the subsoil is Lower Lias This made the area good farming land producing crops of wheat, beans, barley, hops, market garden produce and fruit. Vines were formerly grown at Fladbury.

The name Fladbury derives from the Old English Flaedeburh meaning 'Flaede's fortification'.

Fladbury was a settlement mentioned in Domesday Book, in the hundred of Oswaldslow and the county of Worcestershire. It was also known as Fledanbyrig and Flandenburch. It had a recorded population of around 250 people in 60 households in 1086, putting it in the largest 20% of settlements recorded in Domesday.

A convent existed at Fladbury in Saxon times, and the town was given to the Bishop of Worcester by King Ethelred in 631, and the bishop’s bailiff governed the place. A market was held, on the current, village green on Wednesdays.

The disafforestation of the Horewell Forest, which formerly covered part of the parish of Fladbury, took place in 1229. The parish is still, however, well wooded.

Fladbury Inclosure Act 1788
- Act of Parliament
- Parliament of Great Britain
- Long title: An Act for dividing and enclosing the Open and Common Fields, Common Meadows, and other Common and Waste Lands in Fladbury in the County of Worcester.
- Citation: 28 Geo. 3. c. 16 Pr.
- Territorial extent: Great Britain

Dates
- Royal assent: 20 March 1788
- Commencement: 27 November 1787 (Note: Start of session.)

Status: Current legislation

An inclosure act was passed for Fladbury, the Fladbury Inclosure Act 1788 (28 Geo. 3. c. 16 Pr.), in 1788

By 1822, the number of inhabited households was only 61 households, and increased to 96 households and 425 residents by 1871. By 1879 Fladbury was an important parish and large village, having the river Avon for its eastern boundary, and Fladbury railway station on the Great Western railway line to the north. The station opened in 1854 and closed in 1966.

A national school, with residence for the master, was erected in 1864–65. The current school, Fladbury First and Pre School, is situated next to the original national school.

By the 1911 Census, the population of the village had grown steadily to 468, 229 males and 239 females. Of the 140 properties listed in the census, 127 were inhabited, six uninhabited and seven described simply as buildings. The three largest land owners at the time were the Ecclesiastical Commissioners with 532 acres, the Prince Philippe, Duke of Orléans, (Duc d’Orleans) with 514 acres and the Reverend C.J. Hunt, the Rector of Fladbury, with 234 acres.

During World War II American soldiers were based on the golf course and the recreation ground. The US Army took over the two petrol pumps at the village post office to fuel their vehicles. Craycombe House was used as a military hospital. Immediately after the war Italian and German prisoners of war were housed on the golf course.

== Landmarks ==
There are 24 historic buildings, monuments and sites listed by Historic England in the parish.

=== Church of St John the Baptist ===
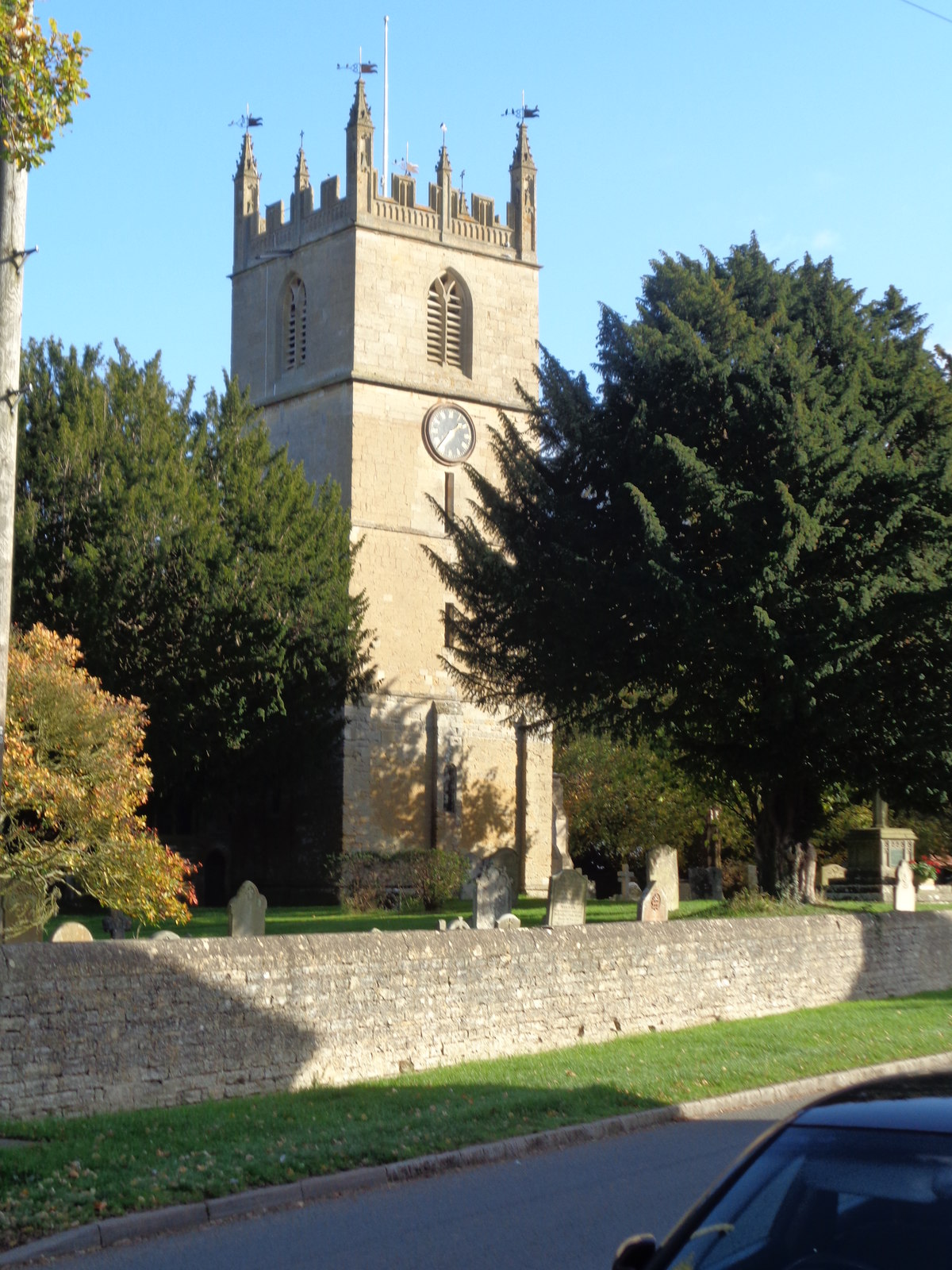
St John The Baptist, Fladbury

The church of St John the Baptist in Fladbury is a Grade I listed church in the village centre. It has been a site of Christian worship since monks settled here in 691AD when Ethelred, King of Mercia, made a grant of land to Oftfor the then Bishop of Worcester. The monks later moved on to found the monastery that became Evesham Abbey. There was possibly a church at Fladbury in 1086, as there was then a priest there. On 14 May 1448, Eleanor, wife of Sir John Throckmorton and her son, Thomas, obtained licence to found the parish church. Sir John Throckmorton of Throckmorton Manor, Knt., (d. 12 April 1445) was later interred in a large altar tomb in Fladbury Church.

No trace of the early Saxon building remains, and the present building dates from the 12th century, with only the base of the tower dating back to Norman times. The church was rebuilt in 1340 with significant restorations taking place during Victorian times. The family of Worcester architect, Frederick Preedy, lived in Fladbury and there is much of his work in the church. He added the chancel and vestry in 1864 and completed a major restoration in 1871. Most of the 19th century fittings are designed by him together with 10 stained glass windows, mainly family memorials.

There are several stained-glass memorial windows, one representing the coats of arms of seven knights slain at the battle of Evesham in 1265. This church is one of the few in Worcestershire which contains memorial brasses. The Nicholson organ dates from 1837. The church also contains many medieval, and later, monuments to local families.

There have been bells in Fladbury Church since 1500. The Sanctus Bell, one of only three in the Worcestershire Diocese, was cast by William Culverdon of London in c1520. There were three bells in the tower in 1552. A new ring of six bells was cast by William Bagley of Chacombe and installed in 1700. They were replaced in 1807 by a new ring cast by Thomas Mears and Son of London. They were rung until 1932 when the bell frame became unstable. An Ellacombe Apparatus was then used until 1984. The bells were refurbished in 1991. The tower now has a ring of eight bells which were rehung on a new frame.

In 1979 the vicar of the church, Rev. John Champion, put a night time silence on the chiming of the church clock because it disturbed his wife's sleep. Some villagers objected to his actions and he held a mini referendum to determine if the clock should chime at night. The church clock continues to chime every hour and quarter hour with Westminster chimes both day and night.

Fladbury is part of the Five Alive Parish which embraces Cropthorne, Charlton, Wyre Piddle and Lower Moor.

=== The Monastery ===
The Monastery is an 18th-century Grade II listed building, opposite the church.

=== The Manor House ===
The Manor House dates from c1700. The Manor House had 14 bedrooms and there was a large domestic staff to look after the family and house. The house has since been divided into three properties.

=== Jubilee Bridge ===
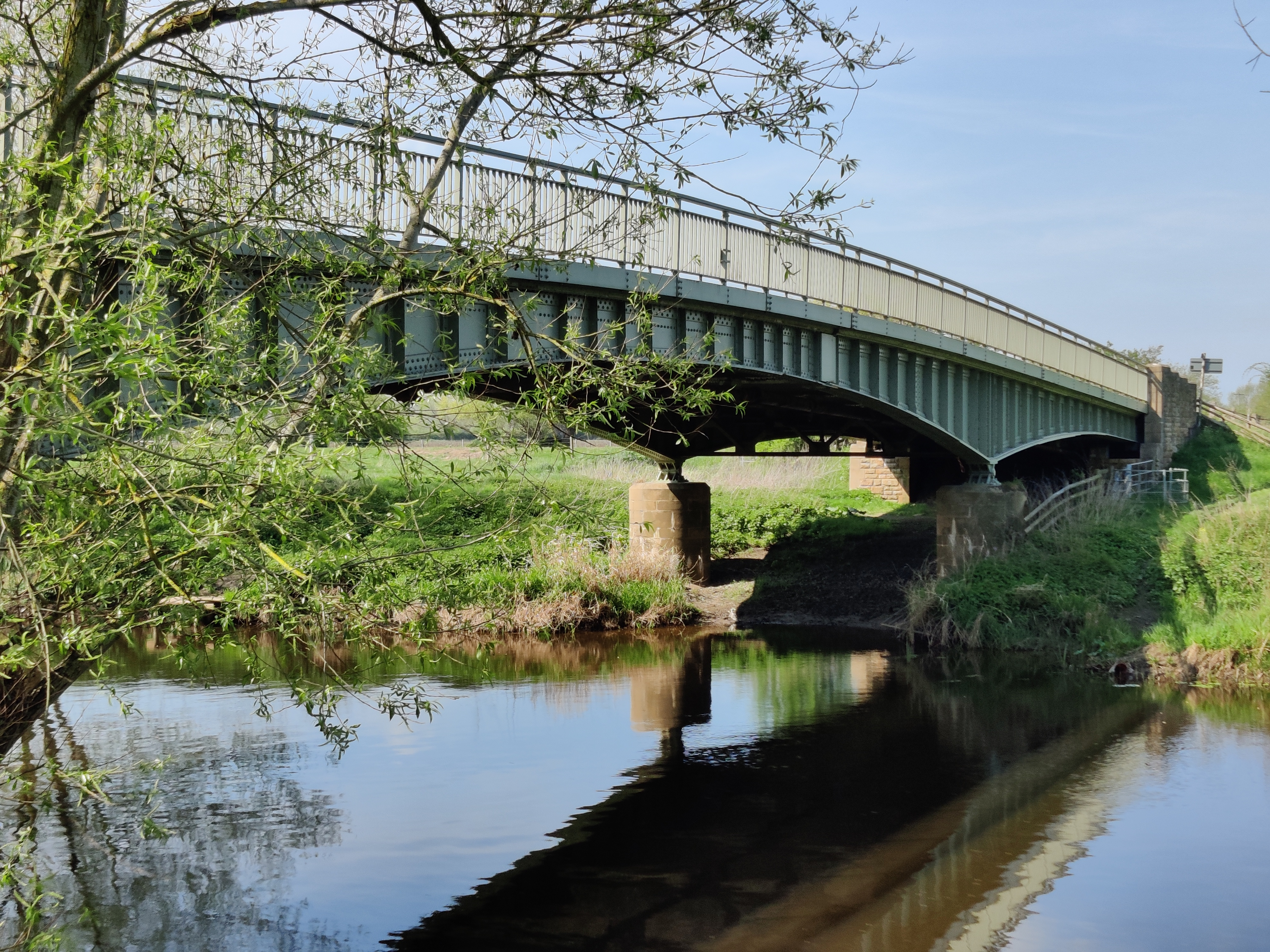
Jubilee Bridge, Fladbury

Jubilee Bridge crosses the River Avon, south of the village. The original bridge replaced a ford (crossing) in the river. It was built in 1897 to commemorate the Diamond Jubilee of Queen Victoria for her fiftieth year of her reign. This bridge was replaced in 1935. For 90 per cent of the time the usual range of the river is between 0.46m and 1.90m. The highest recorded level is 5.52m, on Saturday 21 July 2007 at 2:45 pm.

=== Fladbury Mill ===
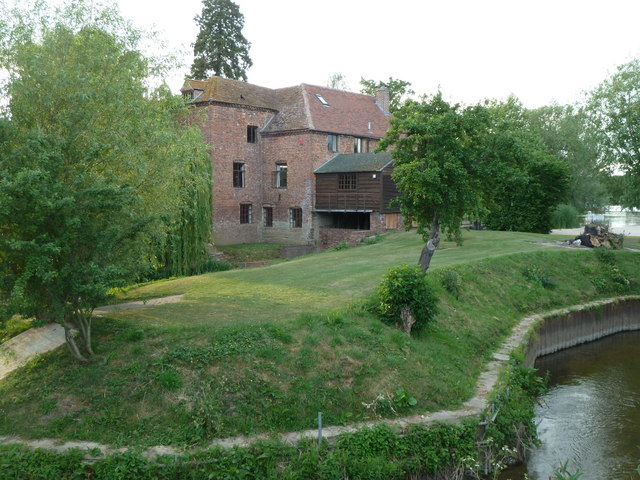
Fladbury Mill

Fladbury Mill is a Grade II listed building, listed in February 1965. There was a mill at Fladbury in 1086. The mill was rebuilt in the 1640s when the river was made navigable and the weir heightened. The current mill dates mainly from the 18th century, with some parts dating from c1640. It is constructed of brick to an irregular plan. It has gabled wings; one gabled bay is of earlier timber framing. The current waterwheel was refitted in 1959, and refurbished in 2003, using galvanised steel and oak panels. It is 12 ft 4 in (3.76 m) in diameter and 7 ft 8 in (2.34 m) wide. It turns at about 4.5m revolutions per minute.

In 1888, electricity generated by the water wheel powered two houses. By 1900, turbines at the mill powered Fladbury's street lighting. The original turbine generates 2 watts and the second turbine 20 watts. Fladbury was the first village in England to have electric street lighting, although Brockley in Gloucestershire makes the same claim. The street lights were made by Messrs. Fisher Humphries and Co. Ltd., a firm of agricultural engineers at Atlas Works, Pershore. Just one of the original six street lamps still exists.

By 1900 two Armfield 40 British Empire turbines, each rated at 25 horsepower, were in use. These were removed in the 1980s and replaced by a second-hand 1937 Gilkes turbine that is still running today. The turbine no longer powers the village lighting.

The mill was given to the Society for the Protection of Ancient Buildings (SPAB) by long-time SPAB member David Wynn in 2021.

=== Cropthorne Mill ===
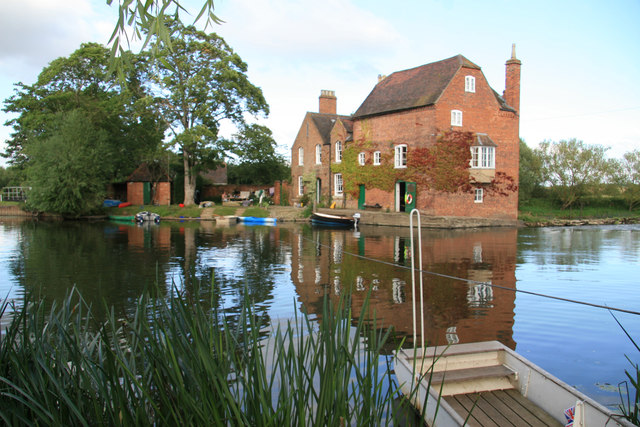
Cropthorne Mill and rope ferry seen from Fladbury

Although not in Fladbury, Cropthorne Mill is sited on the far side of the river from the village, on the other side of the weir to Fladbury Mill. It is accessed by a rope ferry. It is a listed building built in two parts. More recent living accommodation was built probably in the 18th century was added to the much older working original Mill. The best view of Cropthorne Mill is across the river from Fladbury.

== Education ==
A voluntary-aided Church of England First School provides education to around 85 children aged 4 to 10. A September 2007 Ofsted inspection accorded the school a Grade II (good).

== Events and activities ==
Fladbury Walkabout

Fladbury Walkabout was first established in 1970 as a flower festival and since then has run every year except 1972 and during the Covid pandemic, when 2020 and 2021 were years without a Walkabout. The original objective was to raise funds for the church, and to bring the community together in a village event. Walkabout is now an Open Gardens and Flower Festival, which runs on the first weekend of July each year (4 and 5 July in 2026). The event normally includes market stalls, live music, classic cars, children's activities, boat trips and refreshments, dog show, together with a Fun Run on the following Sunday.

FladFest

Fladbury held its first annual music festival to celebrate local bands on 26 April 2024. This was held in the Village Hall. The second FladFest was successfully held on 26 April 2025.

The Magazine Club

A magazine club has existed in Fladbury since the 1910s. Started at a time when magazines were expensive, the club was established to share magazines between members. Each year members will subscribe to a magazine, with each member choosing a different magazine. Magazines are then shared between club members.

TULIP

Tulip, meaning TUesday Lunch In the Pub, is a monthly informal lunch gathering. The group meets on the first Tuesday each month for lunch in one of the two local public houses.

Village People

Village People is a replacement to the Women’s Institute. Members disillusioned with the WI, and faced with closure of local meetings, decided to form their own club. Village People operates across the villages of Fladbury, Cropthorne and Charlton. Its members meet regularly for talks, events, and outings.

== Sporting Clubs ==
Fladbury has a number of sporting clubs, including a cricket club, football club, paddle club and tennis club all based on the recreation ground. The existing playing field (4.628 acres) was purchased by Fladbury Parish Council for £600 in November 1951.

Cricket

Fladbury Cricket Club was established in 1876. Its first match was against Toddington, Gloucestershire. The first formal fixture played on the current ground was on 6 June 1954 against Comberton. The changing room was in a nearby public house and teas cost 1s 9d. In 1985, Fladbury Cricket Club joined a league for the first time. This league was merged with others to create the Worcestershire County League in 1999. The club has the nickname of 'Wagtails' due to the wagtail bird on its logo.

Fishing

Birmingham Anglers Association members have fishing rights on the River Avon in the village between Jubilee Bridge and Fladbury Mill.

Football

Fladbury Football Club plays in the Evesham & District Sunday Football League.

Golf

Evesham Golf Club was founded in 1894. The club is situated on the banks of the River Avon and has 18 holes played over nine greens.

Paddle

Fladbury Paddle Club uses the River Avon. The club has taught 26 international athletes, including sprint canoeists Andrew Train and Stephen Train, who both competed in five summer olympic games between 1988 and 2000. It is renowned for the 'Fladbury Way' of introducing and training new paddle athletes. It runs annual regattas. It is also home to the bellboat, a twin-hulled open canoe that seats either 8 or 14.

Tennis

Fladbury Tennis Club has three courts on the recreation ground.

== Famous residents, people and visitors ==
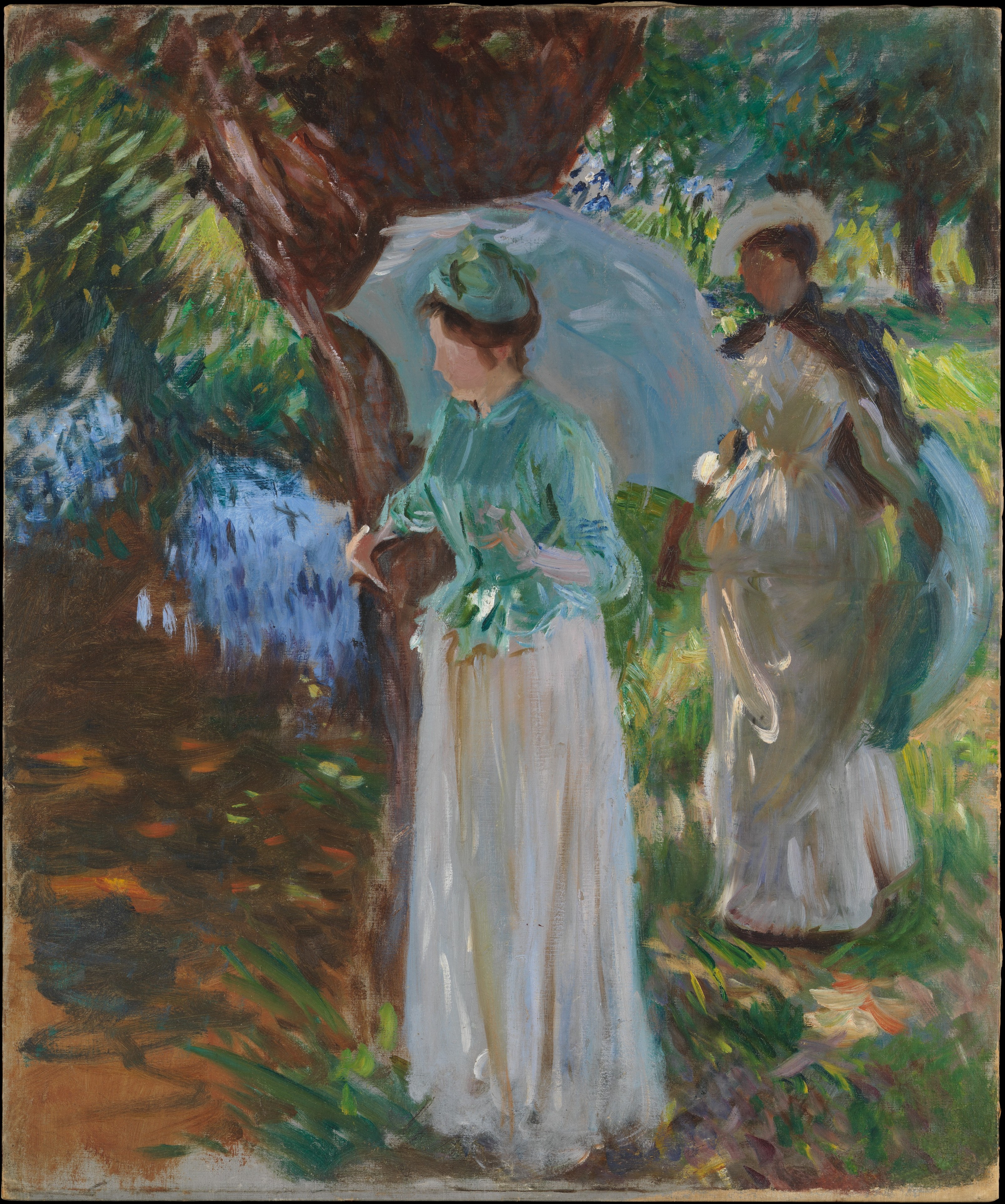
Two Girls with Parasols at Fladbury by John Singer Sargent, 1899

- The American artist John Singer Sargent visited Fladbury in 1889. His painting, "Two Girls with Parasols at Fladbury", is in the Metropolitan Museum of Art in New York. The painting was painted on the stepped terrace of the now demolished Rectory, now Old Rectory Green.
- Graham Dilley
- Robert (Bob) Hitchcock, of Evesham Technology
- David Louden, British Touring Car Racing driver
- Stella McCartney
- Frederick Preedy
- Andrew Train
- Stephen Train
