= Hinton on the Green =

Village in Worcestershire, England

Coordinates: 52.06°N 1.96°W

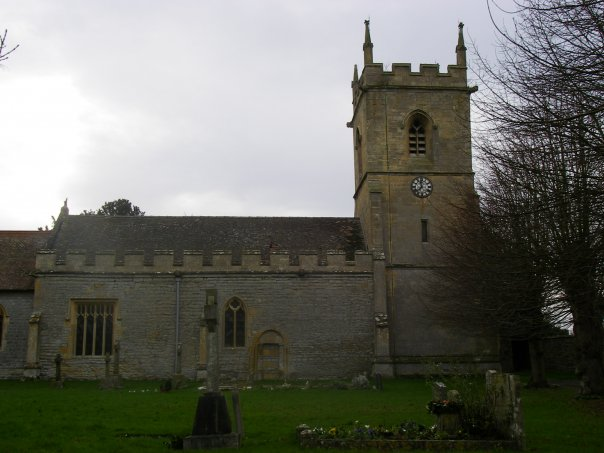
- Parish Church of St.Peter

- Location within Worcestershire
- Population: 234
- OS grid reference: SP023402
- Civil parish: Hinton on the Green
- District: Wychavon
- Shire county: Worcestershire
- Region: West Midlands
- Country: England
- Sovereign state: United Kingdom
- Post town: Evesham
- Postcode district: WR11
- Dialling code: 01386
- Police: West Mercia
- Fire: Hereford and Worcester
- Ambulance: West Midlands
- UK Parliament: West Worcestershire

Hinton on the Green is a village and civil parish in the Wychavon district of Worcestershire in England. It is situated at the foot of Bredon Hill, about two miles south of Evesham.

== Name ==
=== Name history ===
In 981 Elfleda, the sister of Æthelred the Unready (r. 978 – 1013), granted the manor of HINTON to St. Peter's Abbey – now known as Gloucester Cathedral. (Note: Elrington – Hinton on the Green Manor and Other Estates ..."In 981 Elfleda, the sister of King Ethelred, granted the manor of HINTON... to St. Peter's Abbey, Gloucester, which held it until the Dissolution ...)

The name has been recorded in documentary records as:

1. Hinhaema gemaeru (1042).
2. Hinetune (1086).
3. Hinton on the Grene (1537).

=== Etymology ===
The name Hinhaema (1042) derives from Old English higna ..."Farm of the monks or of the nuns".

The suffix ' on the green ' relates to the use of pasture-land for sheep grazing. (Note: Elrington – Hinton on the Green..."it was probably the setting in pasture-land rather than the existence of a central village green that gave rise to the suffix 'on the green', which was used from the early 16th century ...) (Note: Elrington – Hinton on the Green Economic History ..."Sheep were important in the 13th century when there was a shepherd on the manor, and the labour-services of the tenants included 2 days' sheep-washing and shearing ...)

== Description ==
At a little over three square miles, the land is largely agricultural. Most of the 101 houses and 254 residents (as of 2001) are grouped in a small area between the church and the site of the former railway station. The River Isbourne valley divides Hinton into the "East Village", near to the church, and the "West Village".

Most of the houses in the East Village date from the 19th century; many of the properties to the West of the Isbourne are much newer. Most of the farmland, and many of the properties in the East Village, are leased from a Laslett's charity, a trust set up in 1879 by William Laslett, a Worcestershire lawyer, landowner and MP. The charity supports Church of England churches and makes grants to community welfare organisations.

The building that formerly housed a village school has been converted into houses. The single shop in the village is specialised in the sale of agricultural machinery.

The main A46 from Evesham to Cheltenham passes through the parish and is crossed by the Broadway to Pershore Road (formerly The London Road) at Hinton Cross, but the majority of the houses are located on a quiet loop.

The Isbourne is three or four metres wide and less than a metre deep, and occasionally floods. The most notable recent flood was in July 2007 when the small river became a torrent about a hundred metres wide and five metres deep. Two houses built on the river bank suffered serious damage, but the rest of the village is well above the flood plain and avoided the devastation that hit nearby Sedgeberrow just a mile upstream.

== Church ==
The Church of England parish church of St Peter is Grade II* listed.

== Railways ==
The former railway station, known simply as Hinton, belonged to the Midland Railway (later part of the LMS), and was on a lengthy loop line, the Gloucester Loop Line, branching off the Birmingham and Gloucester Railway main line at Ashchurch, passing through Evesham station, Alcester and Redditch, and rejoining the main line at Barnt Green, near Bromsgrove. The loop was built to address the fact that the main line bypassed most of the towns it might otherwise have served, but it took three separate companies to complete.

The loop officially closed between Ashchurch and Redditch in June 1963, but poor condition of the track had brought about withdrawal of all trains between Evesham and Redditch earlier, in October 1962, being replaced by a bus service for the final eight months. Redditch to Barnt Green remains open on the electrified Birmingham suburban network. Hinton station house still stands.

== Sources ==
- Elrington, C R, ed. (1968). 'Parishes: Hinton on the Green', in A History of the County of Gloucester: Volume 8. Victoria County History. British History Online. pp. 262–268.
- Reaney, P. H. (1969). The Origin of English Place Names. Routledge & Kegan Paul.
- Watts, Victor (2007). The Cambridge Dictionary of English Place-Names. Cambridge University Press. ISBN 978-0-521-16855-7.
