= Wyre Halt railway station =

Former railway station in Worcestershire, England

Wyre Halt
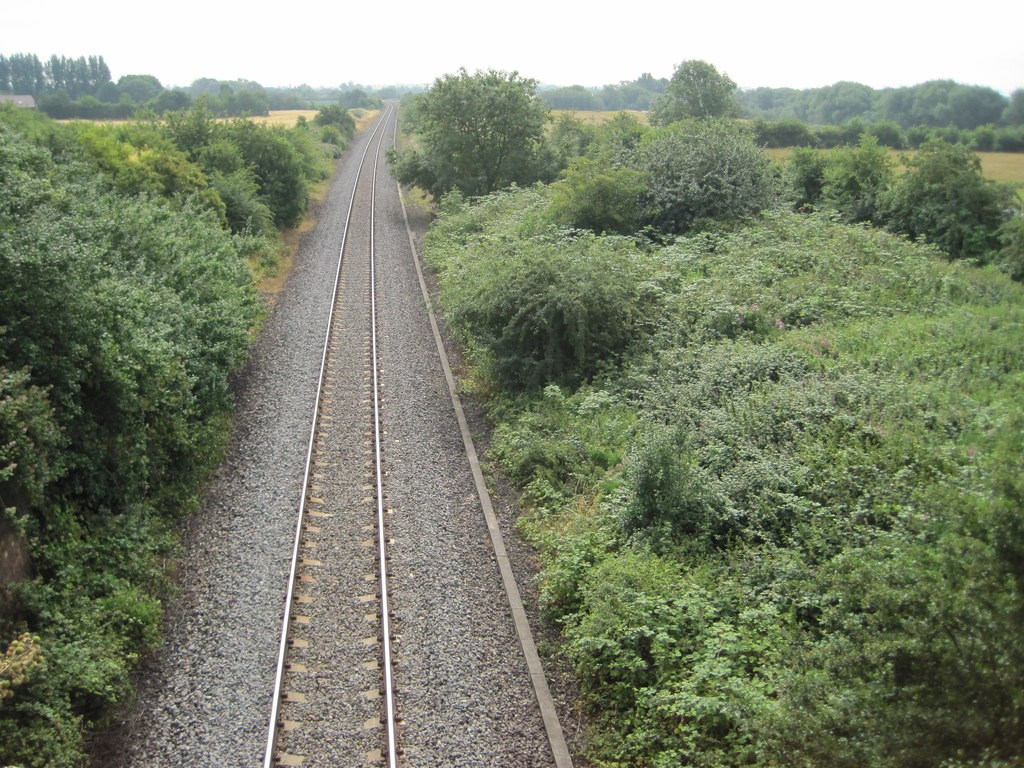
- The site of the station in 2013

General information
- Location: Wyre Piddle, Worcestershire; England
- Coordinates: 52.1250°N 2.0447°W
- Grid reference: SO915428
- Platforms: 2

Other information
- Status: Disused

History
- Post-grouping: Great Western Railway

Key dates
- 11 June 1934: Opened
- 3 January 1966: Closed
Location

Wyre Halt railway station was a station in Wyre Piddle, Worcestershire, England. The station was opened in 1934 and closed in 1966.

Preceding station	Disused railways	Following station
Pershore; Line and station open	Great Western Railway; Oxford, Worcester and Wolverhampton Railway	Fladbury; Line open, station closed
