= Harvington railway station =

Former railway station in Worcestershire, England

Harvington
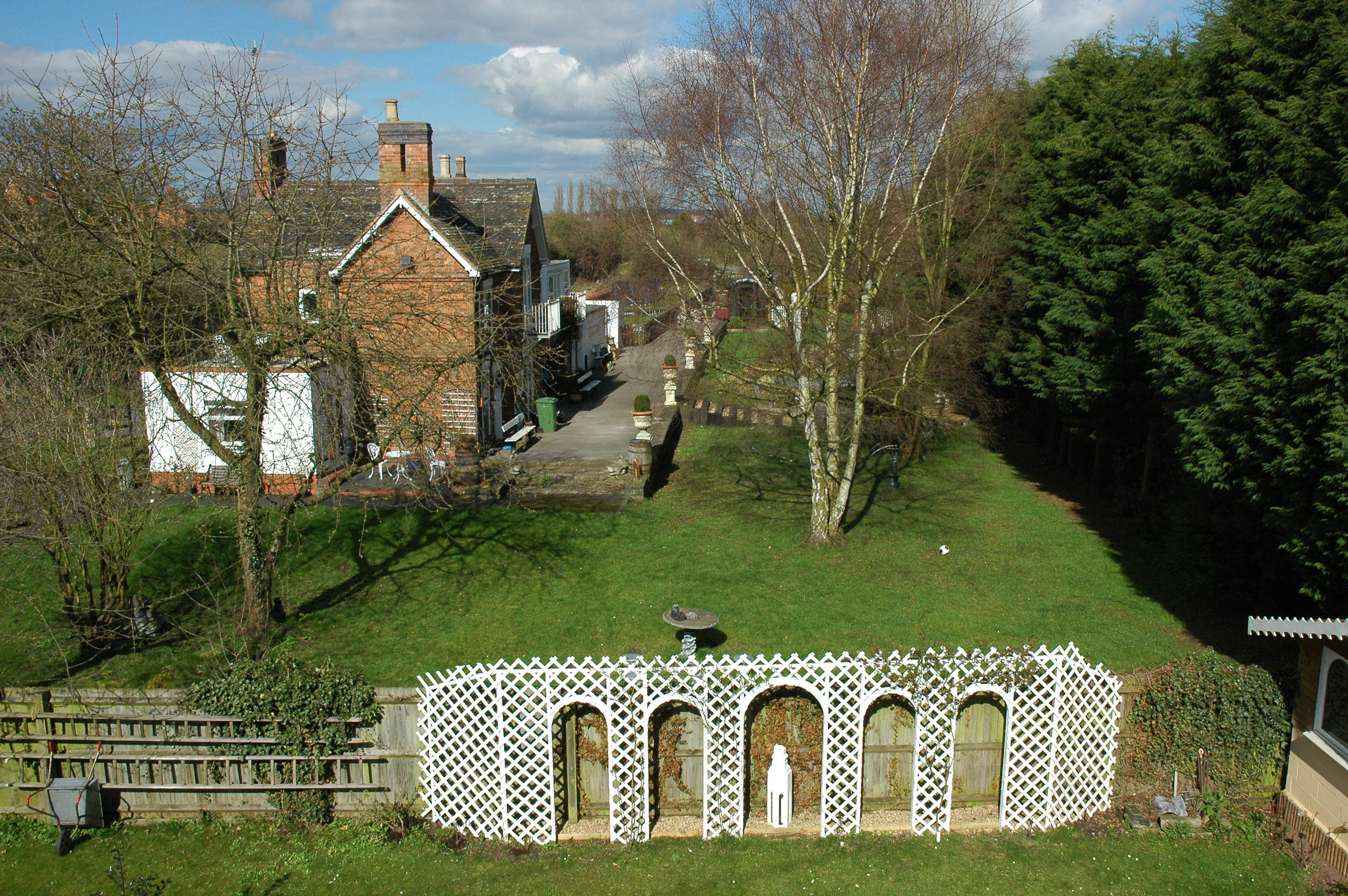
- The site of the station in 2010

General information
- Location: Harvington, Worcestershire; England
- Coordinates: 52.1377°N 1.9135°W
- Grid reference: SP060488
- Platforms: 1

Other information
- Status: Disused

History
- Original company: Evesham and Redditch Railway
- Pre-grouping: Midland Railway
- Post-grouping: London, Midland and Scottish Railway

Key dates
- 17 September 1866: Opened
- 1 October 1962: train service withdrawn
- 17 June 1963: Officially Closed
Location

Harvington railway station was a station in Harvington, Worcestershire, England. The station was opened on 17 September 1866, train services were withdrawn in 1962 and a bus service provided until officially closed on 17 June 1963.

Preceding station	Disused railways	Following station
Salford Priors; Line and station closed	London, Midland and Scottish Railway; Evesham loop line	Evesham; Line closed, station open
