= Beckford, Worcestershire =

Village in Worcestershire, England

Coordinates: 52.016667°N 2.033333°W

Beckford
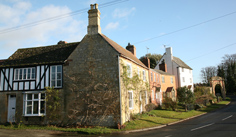
- Beckford Cross House

- Location within Worcestershire
- Population: 602
- OS grid reference: SO972360
  - London: 91 miles (146 km)
- Civil parish: Beckford
- District: Wychavon
- Shire county: Worcestershire
- Region: West Midlands
- Country: England
- Sovereign state: United Kingdom
- Post town: TEWKESBURY
- Postcode district: GL20
- Dialling code: 01386
- Police: West Mercia
- Fire: Hereford and Worcester
- Ambulance: West Midlands
- UK Parliament: West Worcestershire

Beckford is a small village on the main Cheltenham to Evesham Road, five miles north-east of Tewkesbury, on the Worcestershire—Gloucestershire border.

The village straddles the A46 and is one of the villages at the foot of Bredon Hill. The Carrant Brook runs between Beckford and Little Beckford and there was a ford across the brook which gave rise to the original name. The name Beckford derives from the Old English Beccaford meaning 'Becca's ford'.

An intensive poultry unit and market garden lies to the east of the village. A planning application was made in early 2016 to redevelop this as a retirement settlement with social care facilities.

Beckford Nature Reserve lies immediately north of the village.

== History ==
=== Railways ===
Beckford railway station, belonged to the Midland Railway (later part of the LMS), was situated on a lengthy loop line, Gloucester Loop Line, branching off the Birmingham and Gloucester Railway main line at Ashchurch for Tewkesbury railway station, passing through Evesham railway station, Alcester and Redditch, and rejoining the main line at Barnt Green, near Bromsgrove. The loop officially closed between Ashchurch and Redditch in June 1963, but trains were replaced by a bus service for the final eight months, since poor condition of the track had brought about withdrawal of all trains between Evesham and Redditch in October 1962. The village is still linked to Evesham by Diamond Bus service 540 which also serves Tewkesbury.
