= Fladbury railway station =

Former railway station in Worcestershire, England

Fladbury
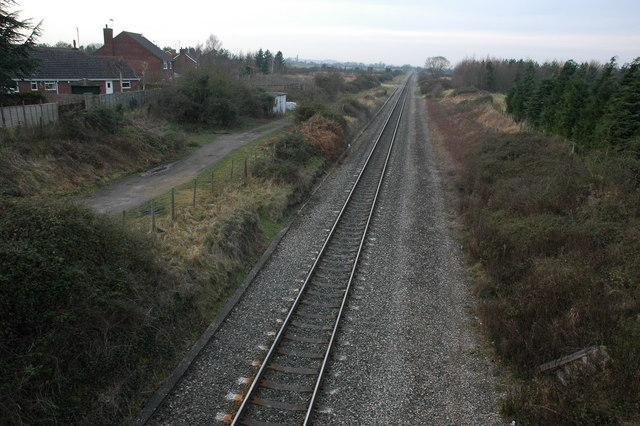
- The site of the station in 2008

General information
- Location: Fladbury, Worcestershire; England
- Coordinates: 52.1190°N 2.0108°W
- Grid reference: SO993467
- Platforms: 2

Other information
- Status: Disused

History
- Original company: Oxford, Worcester and Wolverhampton Railway
- Pre-grouping: Great Western Railway
- Post-grouping: Great Western Railway

Key dates
- 1854: Opened
- 1966: Closed
Location

Fladbury railway station was a station in Fladbury, Worcestershire, England. The station was opened in 1854 and closed in 1966.

Preceding station	Disused railways	Following station
Wyre Halt; Line open, station closed	Great Western Railway; Oxford, Worcester and Wolverhampton Railway	Evesham; Line and station open
