= Beckford Nature Reserve =

Nature reserve in Worcestershire, England

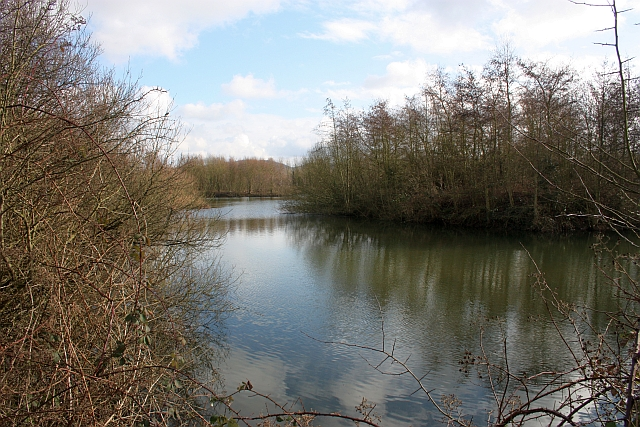

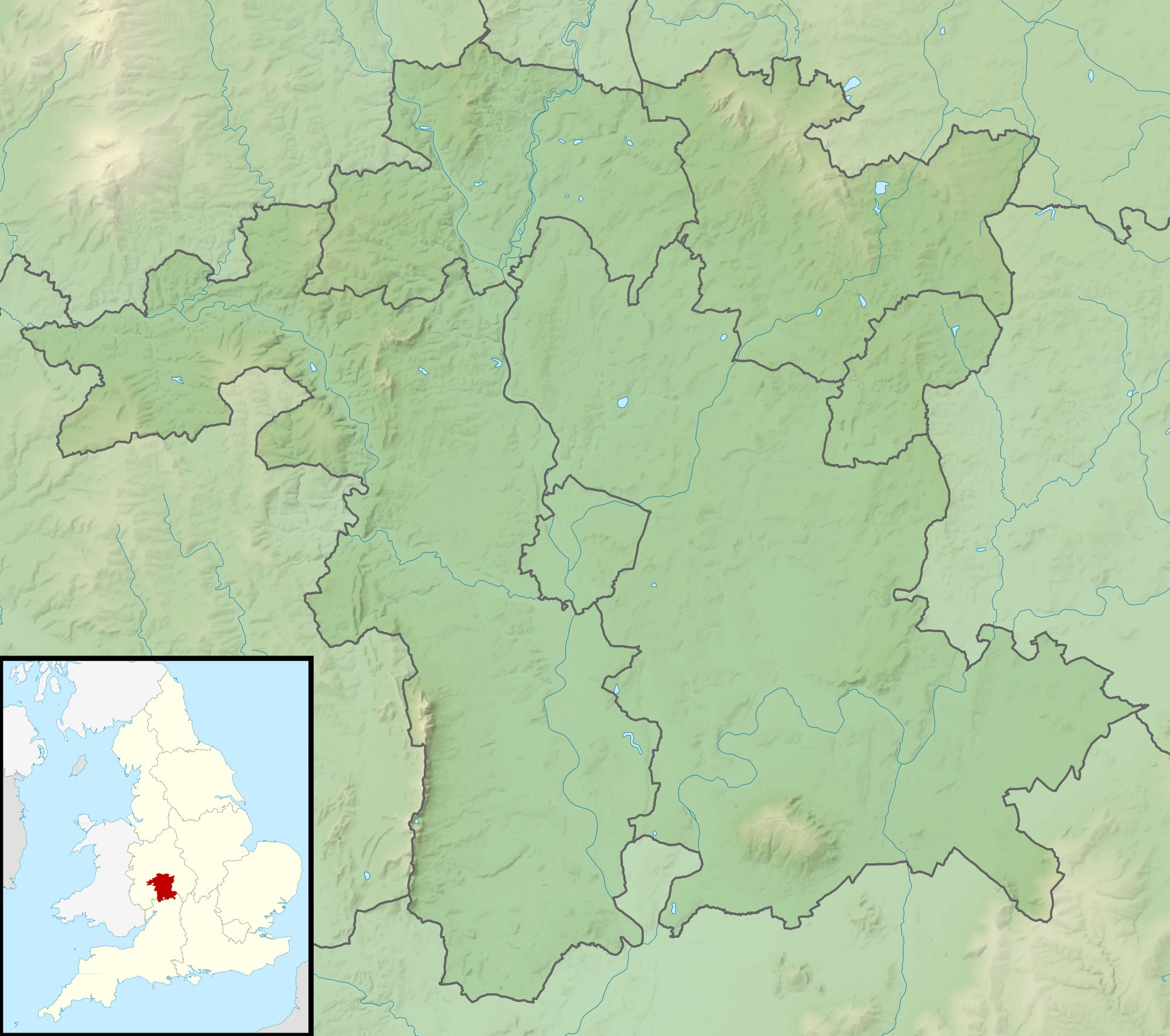
- Location within Worcestershire
- Interactive map of Beckford Nature Reserve
- Location: Beckford, Worcestershire
- OS grid: SO 976 361
- Coordinates: 52°1′23″N 2°2′11″W
- Designation: Site of Special Scientific Interest
- Website: www.beckfordnature.org.uk

Beckford Nature Reserve is near Beckford, in Worcestershire, England, situated immediately north of the village. The nature reserve was created from a former gravel quarry in the 1980s.

== Description ==
There is a path around the lake, and there are two bird hides. Water birds that may be seen include mallard, wigeon and moorhen; also Canada goose and greylag goose. Sand martins nest on the old quarry face. There are areas of woodland, a habitat for native birds and animals; bluebells and other spring flowers can be seen on the woodland floor.

Because of the particular geology of the site, it is designated a Site of Special Scientific Interest.

=== History ===
The site was originally playing fields of the Salesian Monastery School, which closed in the 1970s. Permission was given to Huntsmans Quarries Ltd in 1980 to extract gravel, and this work began in 1981, continuing until 1987. There was progressive restoration from 1982, in which topsoil and subsoil was stored and later used for establishing an eventual nature reserve. The site was landscaped, with trees planted and the creation of a lake with a small island.

Restoration was completed in 1989; it was allowed to mature for three years, and the nature reserve was managed jointly by Beckford Parish Council and Huntsmans Quarries. In 2002 Huntsmans Quarries won a restoration award from the Quarry Products Association.

The reserve was purchased in 2008 by Beckford Nature Reserve Ltd, a registered charity formed by local residents.
