= Hampton Ferry (River Avon) =

Ferry across the River Avon in England

Coordinates: 52.091220°N 1.957970°W

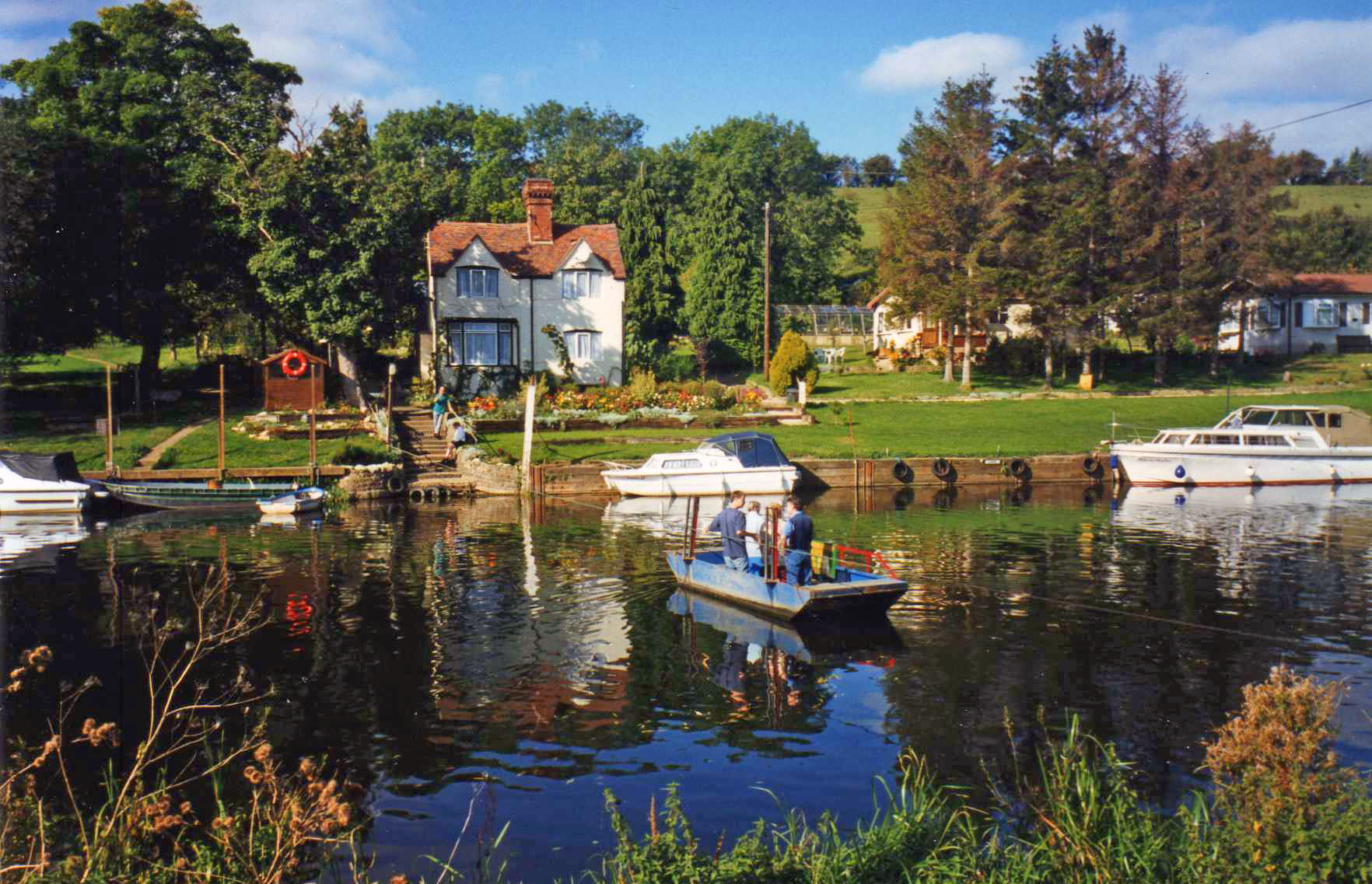
Hampton Ferry

The Hampton Ferry is a pedestrian cable ferry linking Evesham and the village of Hampton across the River Avon in the English county of Worcestershire. The route dates back to the 13th century, when it was established by the monks of Evesham Abbey as a short-cut to their newly planted vineyard on Clark's Hill.

The ferry is manually operated by pulling on a cable that is suspended across the river. When the ferry is docked at either bank the cable is allowed to sink to the river bottom, so as not to interfere with navigation.
