= Hampton, Worcestershire =

Area of Evesham, Worcestershire, England

Coordinates: 52.087523°N 1.965823°W

Hampton
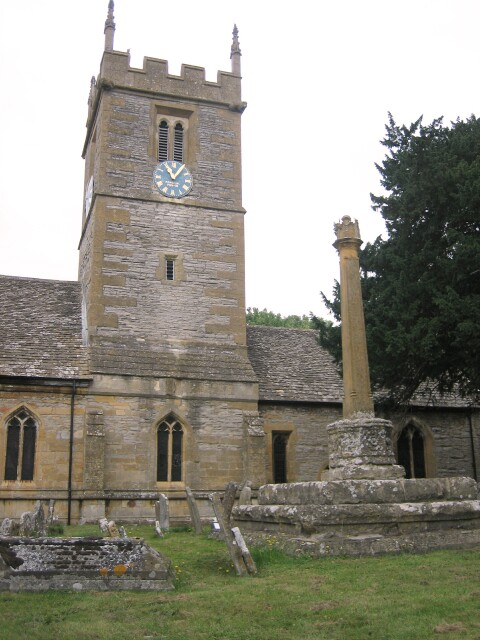
- St Andrew's Parish Church

- Location within Worcestershire
- District: Wychavon
- Shire county: Worcestershire
- Region: West Midlands
- Country: England
- Sovereign state: United Kingdom
- Post town: EVESHAM
- Postcode district: WR11
- Dialling code: 01386
- Police: West Mercia
- Fire: Hereford and Worcester
- Ambulance: West Midlands

Hampton is an area of Evesham in Worcestershire, England having formerly been a separate village.

It is linked to the nearby town of Evesham by the ancient Hampton Ferry. It was a string of small hamlets on the same side of the Avon: Great Hampton, Bengeworth station, Eastwick, and Little Hampton.

== History ==
The name Hampton derives from the Old English hēahtūn meaning 'high settlement'.

The area around Hampton was historically part of the lands of Evesham Abbey.

The current parish church, St Andrew's, dates to the late 14th and early 15th centuries. The church was restored in 1903.

=== Hampton floods July 2007 ===
There was major flooding within Hampton in July 2007 in which most of village became isolated due to water covering all sides of the town. During this event many trucks and lorries were trapped within the village. This also happened to be the day in which the Hampton Spar reopened and nearly all the shop's supply of food was bought.

== Transport ==
In 2022, Worectershire County Council proposed to construct a new pedestrian and cycle bridge between Hampton and Evesham town center. Construction preparations began in February 2025.
