= River Avon, Warwickshire =

River in central England

River Avon
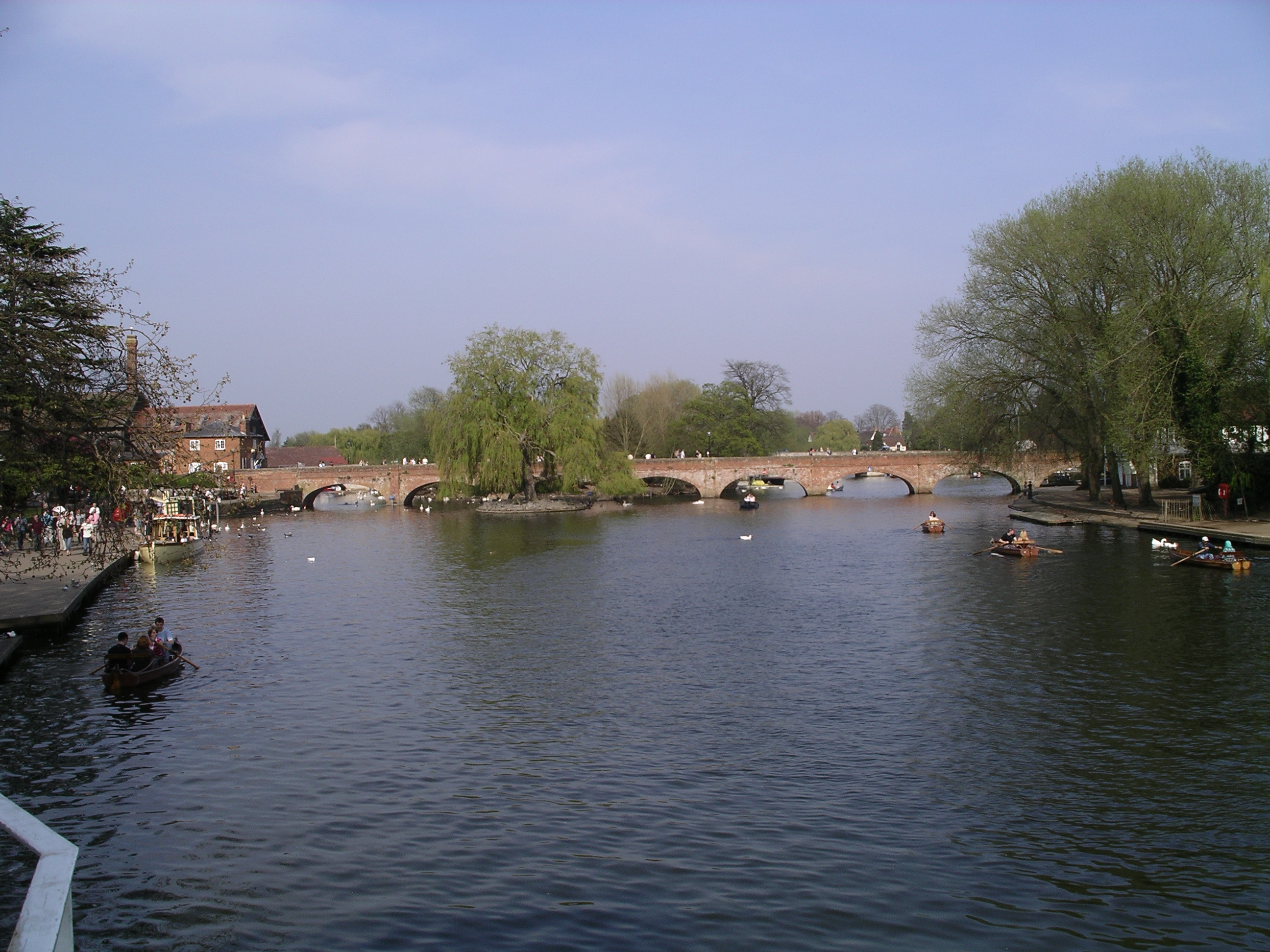
- The River Avon by the Royal Shakespeare; Theatre in Stratford-upon-Avon

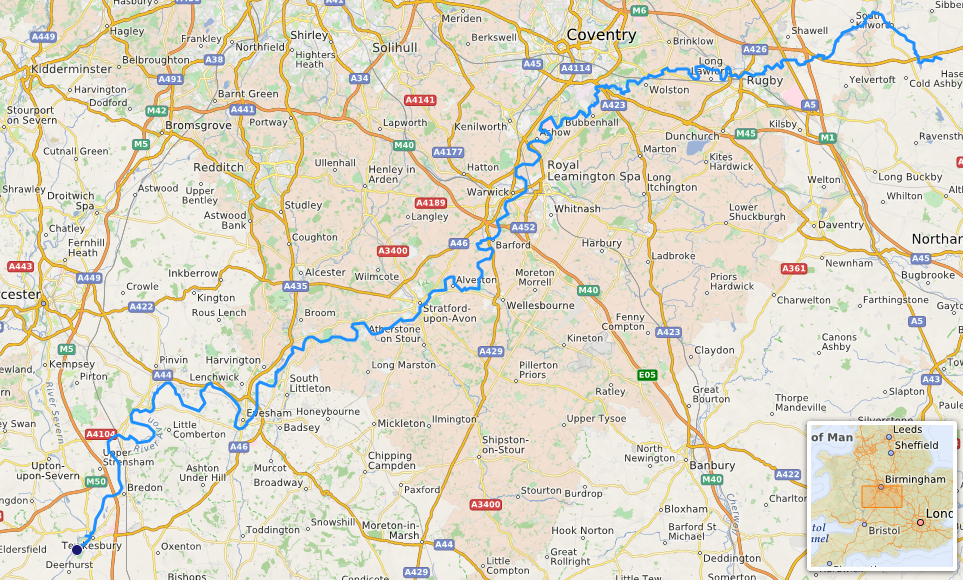
- Path of the Avon ()

Location
- Country: England
- Counties: Northamptonshire, Leicestershire, Warwickshire, Worcestershire, Gloucestershire
- Towns: Rugby, Warwick, Stratford-upon-Avon, Evesham, Tewkesbury

Physical characteristics
- Source
  - location: Naseby, Northamptonshire
  - coordinates: 52.3975°N 0.9887°W
- Mouth
  - location: Confluence with the River Severn, Tewkesbury
  - coordinates: 51.9964°N 2.1634°W
- Length: 137 km (85 mi)
- Basin size: 2,670 km^{2} (1,030 sq mi)
- Discharge
  - location: Evesham
  - average: 15.5 m^{3}/s (550 cu ft/s)
- Discharge
  - location: Bredon
  - average: 16.7 m^{3}/s (590 cu ft/s)

Basin features
- Progression: Avon → Severn → Bristol Channel → Celtic Sea
- River system: Severn
- Tributaries
  - left: Leam, Stour, Isbourne
  - right: Swift, Sowe, Arrow

The River Avon (/ˈeɪvən/ AY-vən or /ˈeɪvɒn/ AY-von) in central England flows generally southwestwards and is a major left-bank and easternmost tributary of the River Severn. It is also known as the Warwickshire Avon or Shakespeare's Avon, to distinguish it from several other rivers of the same name in the United Kingdom.

Beginning in Northamptonshire, the river flows through or adjoining the counties of Leicestershire, Northamptonshire, Warwickshire, Worcestershire and Gloucestershire, near the Cotswold Hills area. Notable towns it flows through include Rugby, Warwick, Stratford-upon-Avon, Evesham, Pershore and Tewkesbury, where it joins the Severn. It has traditionally been divided since 1719 into the Lower Avon, below Evesham, and the Upper Avon, from Evesham to above Stratford-upon-Avon.

Improvements to aid navigation began in 1635, and a series of locks and weirs made it possible to reach Stratford, and to within 4 miles (6 km) of Warwick. The Upper Avon was tortuous and prone to flooding, and was abandoned as a means of navigation in 1877. The Lower Avon struggled on, and never really closed, although by 1945 it was only navigable below Pershore. Restoration of the lower river as a navigable waterway began in 1950, and was completed in 1962. The upper river was a more daunting task, as most of the locks and weirs were no longer extant. Work began in 1965 on the construction of nine new locks and 17 miles (27 km) of river, using mainly volunteer labour, and was completed in 1974 when it was opened by Queen Elizabeth the Queen Mother.

The Avon connects with the Stratford-upon-Avon Canal in the centre of Stratford, and is used primarily by leisure craft. Plans to extend the navigable river to provide a link with the Grand Union Canal at either Warwick or Leamington Spa have met with some opposition.

== Etymology ==
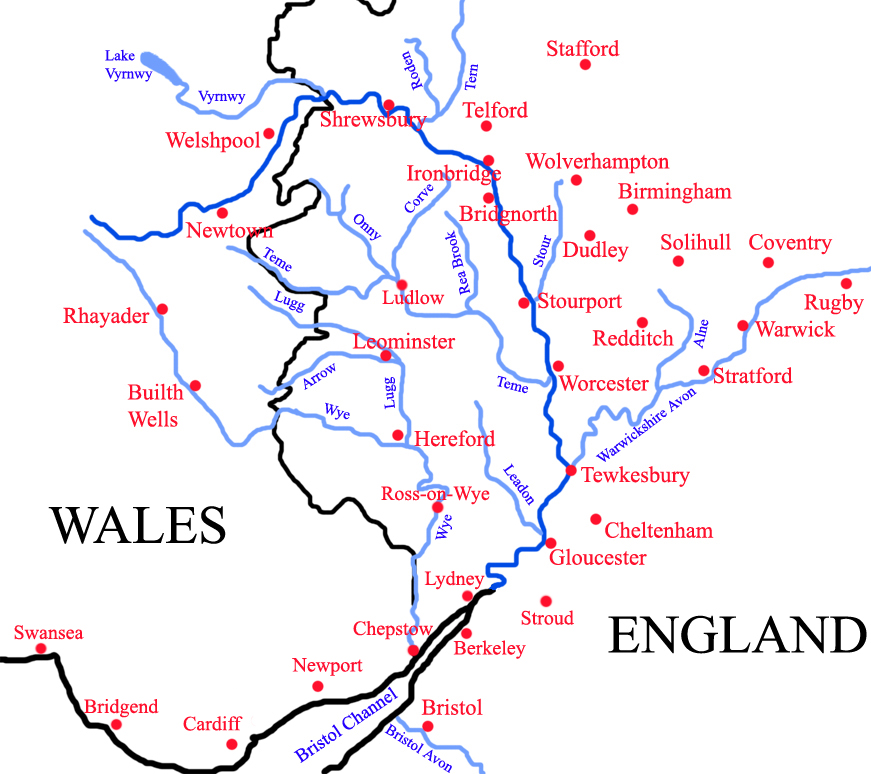
The drainage basin of the Severn. The Avon is the easternmost river shown.

"Avon" derives from the British language abona, "river", which also survives as a number of other English and Scottish river names, and as modern Welsh afon [ˈavɔn] and Cornish avon, "river". This makes "River Avon" an example of a tautological place name.

== Course ==
The source of the Avon is from a spring near the village of Naseby in Northamptonshire. For the first few miles of its length from the village of Welford it forms the border between Northamptonshire and Leicestershire, on this section, it has been dammed to create Stanford Reservoir. Upon reaching Dow Bridge on Watling Street it enters Warwickshire. It then flows in a generally west-southwesterly direction, passing through the towns and villages of Rugby, Wolston, (bordering Leamington Spa), Warwick, Stratford-upon-Avon, Welford-on-Avon, Bidford-on-Avon, Evesham and Pershore, before it joins the River Severn at Tewkesbury.

The river has a total length of 85 miles (137 km) and a catchment size of 1,032 square miles (2,670 km^{2}). The Avon's tributaries include the Rivers Swift, Leam, Stour, Sowe, Dene, Arrow, Isbourne and Swilgate as well as many minor streams and brooks.

A long distance footpath called Shakespeare's Avon Way follows the river from its source at Naseby to the River Severn at Tewkesbury. It is 88 miles (142 km) long, and uses existing footpaths and tracks to stay as close to the river as is reasonably possible.

== Prehistory ==
Before the last glacial period about 50,000 years ago, the Warwickshire Avon was a small river which drained northwards to the River Trent. During the Wolstonian glacial period, ice advanced into the Midlands from the north, east and west blocking the flow of the Avon to its former confluence with the Trent. The waters were thus trapped: on the north, east and west by the glacier, and by the Cotswolds to the south, resulting in the formation of a large glacial lake, which has been called Lake Harrison. At its maximum, it is considered that this glacial lake covered the whole of Warwickshire and was over 200 feet (60 m) deep. After about 10,000 years, when the glacier finally retreated, the water was able to cut through the previous watershed and to escape to the southwest, so forming the present day route of the river.

== Navigation ==
From Alveston weir, which is 2 miles (3.2 km) upstream of Stratford-upon-Avon, downstream to Tewkesbury and the River Severn, the river has been rendered navigable by the construction of locks and weirs. The Stratford-upon-Avon Canal links to the Avon through a lock in the park in front of the Royal Shakespeare Theatre in Stratford-upon-Avon. The River Avon can be used by boats with a maximum length of 70 ft (21 m), beam of 13 ft 6 in (4.1 m), height of 10 ft (3.0 m) and draught of 4 ft (1.2 m) from Tewkesbury to Evesham. Above Evesham, beam is restricted to 12 ft 6 in (3.8 m) and draught to 3 ft (0.9 m).

The river is crossed by two manually operated pedestrian chain ferries, these being the Hampton Ferry in Evesham and the Stratford-upon-Avon Ferry in Stratford-upon-Avon.

Traffic is now exclusively leisure-oriented. Overnight moorings are available at Stratford-upon-Avon, Luddington, Welford-on-Avon, Barton, Bidford-on-Avon, Harvington, Offenham, Evesham, Craycombe, Wyre, Pershore, Defford, Comberton, Birlingham, Eckington, Strensham and Tewkesbury. There are boatyards at Stratford-upon-Avon, Welford-on-Avon, Barton, Bidford-on-Avon, Evesham, and Tewkesbury.

The river forms part of the Avon Ring, a circular cruising route which is 109 miles (175 km) long, and includes 129 locks. From Tewkesbury it follows the course of the River Severn, the Worcester and Birmingham Canal and the Stratford-upon-Avon Canal to arrive back at the Avon at Stratford-upon-Avon.

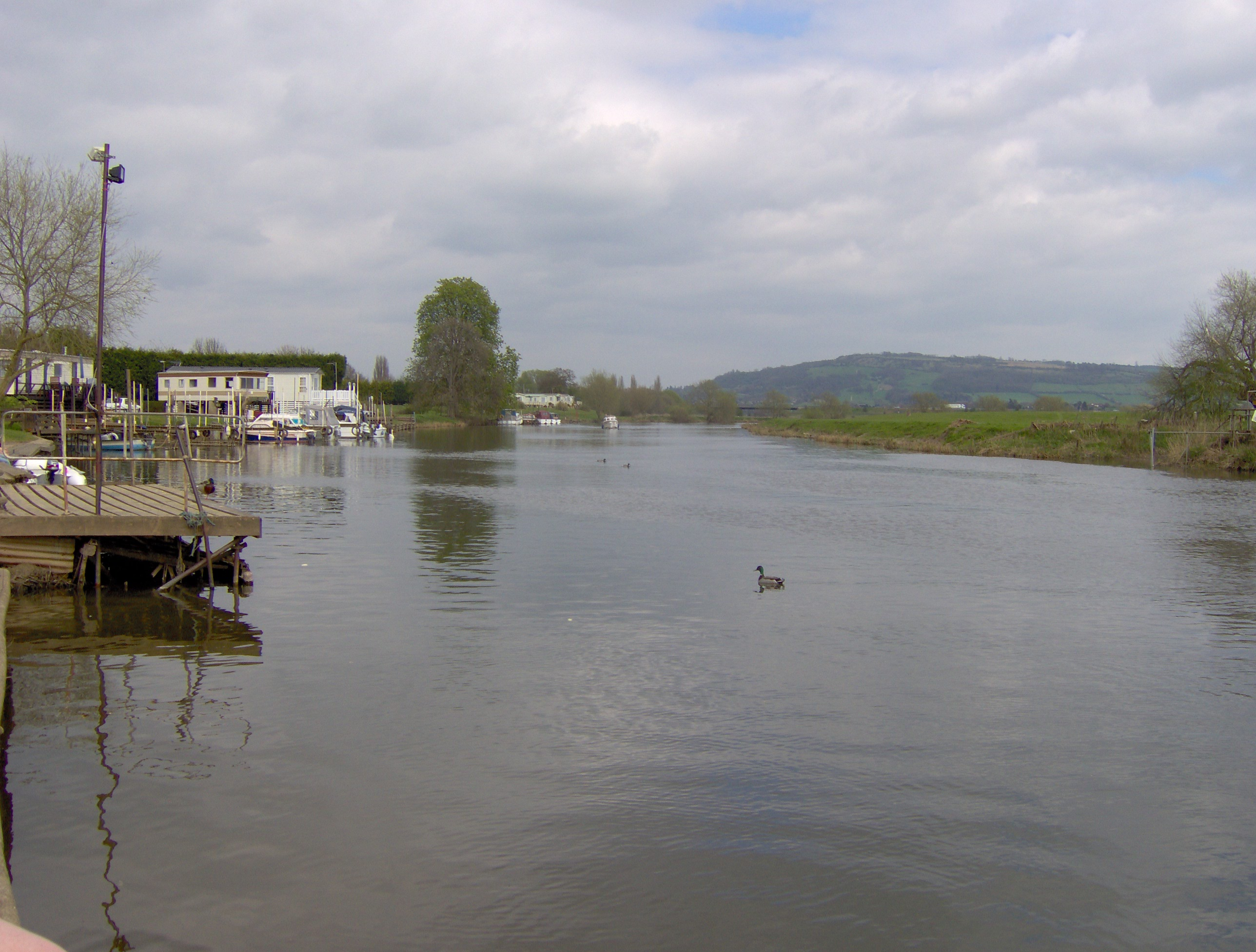
The Avon viewed from the garden of the Fleet Inn, Twyning, Gloucestershire

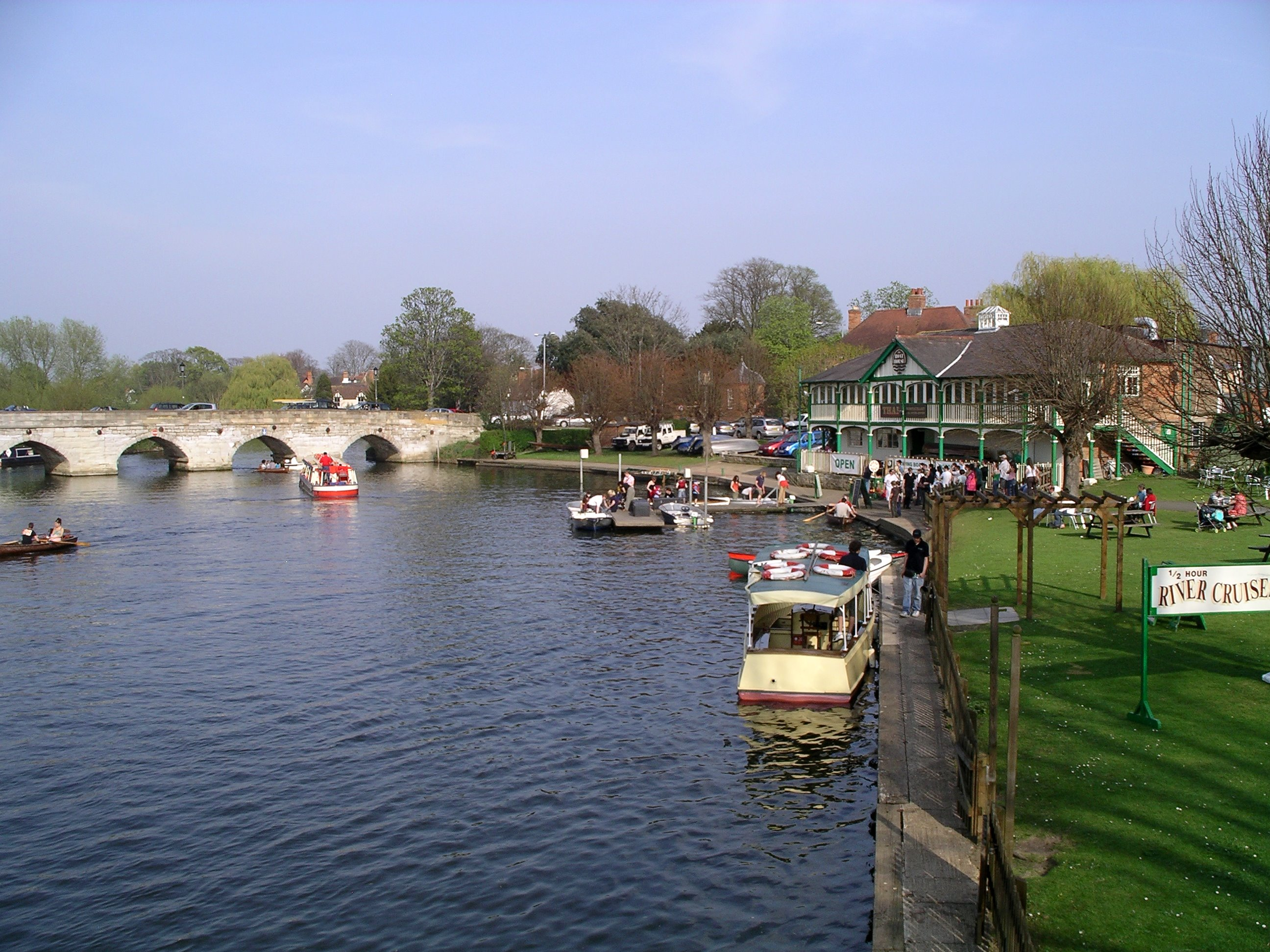
The Avon in Stratford-upon-Avon on a sunny day

== History ==
The navigation works on the Avon were originally authorised by an Order in Council and letters patent of Charles I in 1635, which named William Sandys as the grantee, with powers to improve both this river and the River Teme. He had already bought a number of mills on the river, but there were few objections from millers at those he did not own, for he built pound locks with two sets of gates, to enable vessels to pass by without the large loss of water associated with flash locks. The only objections were from Sir William Russell, who owned Strensham mill, and whose grievance was about land purchase, rather than the navigation works. By 1641 it was reported that the river was navigable to within 4 miles (6 km) of Warwick.

After a period of decline, navigation rights along the river were confirmed by a clause in the Rivers Stour and Salwarpe Navigation Act 1662 (14 Cha. 2. c. 14 Pr.). Further improvements were made to the river above Evesham from 1664 by a syndicate led by Andrew Yarranton. He was working for Lord Windsor and others, and the work included the construction of three navigation weirs, which were a type of flash lock with a single barrier. These were used to enable boats to pass over shoals, and with the exception of the one at Pensham, were not built adjacent to mills. The Pensham watergate did at times hinder the proper operation of the mill, when the water levels rose above the gate. Once Yarranton's work was completed, barges of 30 tonnes could navigate to Stratford.

Ownership of the navigation was formally divided into the Upper and Lower Avon in 1717, with Evesham being the dividing point. The Lower Avon Navigation between Evesham and the River Severn was leased by George Perrott in 1758, who spent over £4,000 upgrading the locks and weirs to enable 40-ton barges to navigate the river. The work was completed by 1768. Perrott then intended to sell the navigation, but when the Stratford Canal was being promoted, he had a clause inserted into the bill to force the Worcester and Birmingham Canal to make payments to him in view of the expected drop in tolls that the navigation would experience. Once the Stratford Canal was completed, there was fierce competition between the Upper and Lower Avon companies, with coal from the Worcester and Birmingham coming up-river to Evesham, and coal coming down-river from Stratford. As the tolls dropped, Perrott leased the Lower river to the Worcester and Birmingham Canal company from 1830 until 1851.

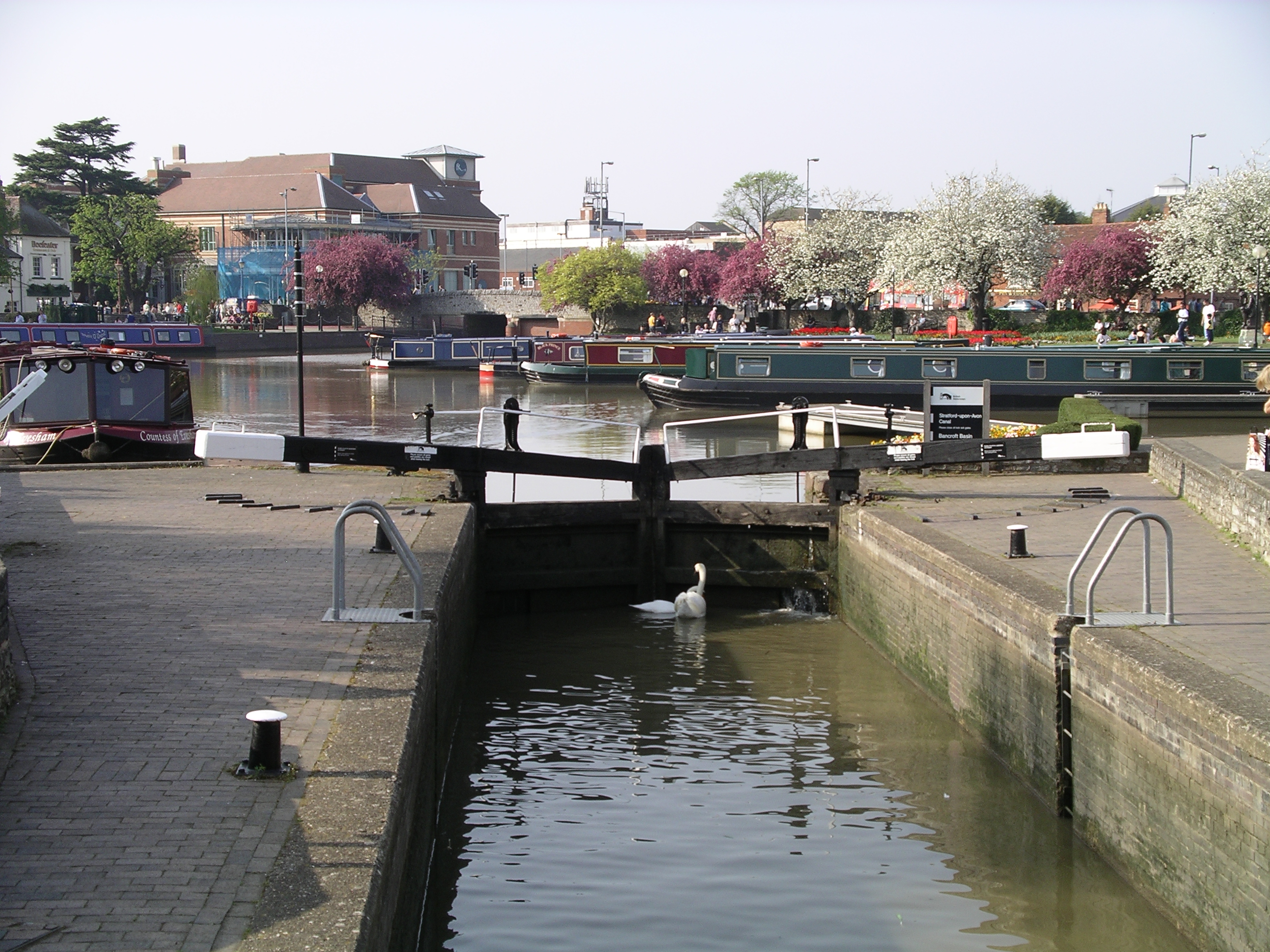
One of the two lock gates between the River Avon and the Stratford-on-Avon canal

Meanwhile, the Upper Avon Navigation between Stratford and Evesham was owned by relatives of Lord Windsor, who had died in 1758, and its condition gradually deteriorated. Because of the sinuous course of the upper river, it was never really considered as a through navigation, except for a brief period when William James thought it could become a through route. He bought all of the shares in the Upper Avon company in 1813, and persuaded the Stratford Canal shareholders that there should be a junction between their canal and the river at Stratford, which was opened on 24 June 1816. In 1822, he spent £6,000 repairing the locks on the upper river, and became bankrupt. The navigation was taken over by seven men, all connected with the Stratford Canal, who turned Lucy's lock at Stratford into a two-rise staircase lock, constructed three new locks, and improved the river by dredging. Most of the subsequent traffic was local, competing with the Lower Avon for the delivery of coal to Evesham. The Upper Avon was leased to the Stratford Canal from 1842, but there was little traffic, and the lease was not renewed in 1847. The arrival of the Oxford, Worcester and Wolverhampton Railway at Stratford sealed its fate, and when the company failed to sell the navigation to local landowners for £150, they effectively abandoned it in 1857. John Broughton, who was the railway manager at Stratford, was persuaded to buy the navigation for £300 by local traders, but the venture was short-lived. Broughton was succeeded, and the railway, now called the West Midland Railway, became part of the Great Western Railway. In 1875, the GWR decided it would no longer maintain the river, and an appeal to the Railway Commissioners in 1877 ruled that they were not obliged to do so.

The Lower Avon Navigation never quite fell into total disuse. The Worcester and Birmingham Canal renewed their lease in 1851 for a further 21 years, but traffic was severely hit by the opening of a railway link from Ashchurch to Evesham in 1864. Receipts had dropped to £139 in 1872, and the canal company did not renew their lease again. Somehow the navigation remained open, and as the commercial traffic declined, there was a gradual increase in pleasure usage. By the end of the Second World War only one barge was plying the stretch between Tewkesbury and Pershore, and the river above Pershore became unnavigable.

== Restoration ==
The first moves to return the waterway to a navigable condition occurred in March 1949, when the Evesham Journal published an article on its history and decline. Robert Aickman started a correspondence with the editor of the article, suggesting that the river could be restored. C. Douglas Barwell sought legal advice on how best the proposal could be managed, out of which the Lower Avon Navigation Trust Ltd (LANT) was constituted as a charity in 1950, and the BBC broadcast news of the proposals in April 1950. By May 1952, despite being in a period of great austerity, LANT had raised over £4,000 towards the work, and the involvement of the Royal Engineers, who helped with the reconstruction of Chadbury Lock as a training exercise, increased public awareness, and enabled further public appeals for funds to be made. By 1962, LANT had raised over £50,000, the seven locks from Tewkesbury to Evesham were restored to working order, re-opening the Lower Avon, and plans were already being made to rebuild Evesham Town Lock and press on towards Stratford. Mrs Barwell, the wife of Douglas Barwell, formally opened the waterway in June 1962. Mr. Barwell received an OBE for his work on the navigation.

An anonymous benefactor was about to give £80,000 in 1963 towards the restoration on the Upper Avon, while a donation of £5,000 enabled Evesham lock to be rebuilt and opened on 11 June 1964. Collins Brothers, who owned the lock site, with the main dam, sluice and weir, donated them to the Lower Avon Navigation Trust in 1966, extending the jurisdiction of the Lower Avon above its historical limits. The other waterway to Stratford, the Stratford-upon-Avon Canal, had been restored by the National Trust and was opened by Queen Elizabeth the Queen Mother exactly a month later, and her involvement caught the public's imagination. Although the Upper Avon was in a much worse condition than the Lower Avon, the Upper Avon Navigation Trust Ltd (UANT) was constituted in 1965 to rebuild it. The project was led by David Hutchings, fresh from completing the Stratford Canal restoration, who obtained permission to build a new lock at Stratford in early 1966, and launched an appeal for £6,000 to fund it. Work began on 19 July 1966, once half the cost had been raised.

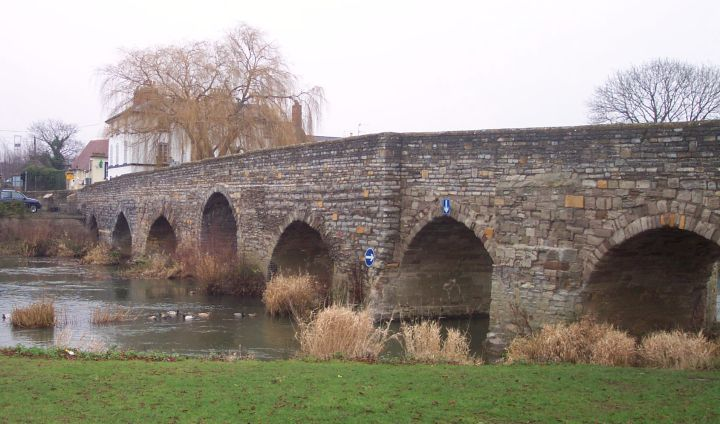
Bridge at Bidford-on-Avon; notice the navigation arch at the right

The concept of building new locks and weirs, with most of the work being undertaken by volunteers, was new. Negotiation with the Severn River Authority led to an agreement that such works could be constructed, which was eventually formalised when a private bill was put before Parliament, which became the Upper Avon Navigation Act 1972 (c. xxiv). Further funding came from an Inland Waterways Association national restoration fund, launched in 1969. Work continued, with phase one, covering the section from Evesham to Bidford Bridge, being declared open on 12 June 1971, during an IWA boat rally at Bidford. The estimated cost for the complete restoration was £250,000, all of which was raised by public subscriptions, with the exception of a grant for £25,000 from the Department of the Environment, which was made at the time of the phase 1 opening. The project, which involved the construction of nine new locks, reopening a 17-mile (27 km) navigation which had been derelict for over 100 years, was completed on 1 June 1974, when Queen Elizabeth the Queen Mother returned to Stratford to declare it open. It was the largest project of its type to that date, and Hutchings was awarded an MBE for his leadership.

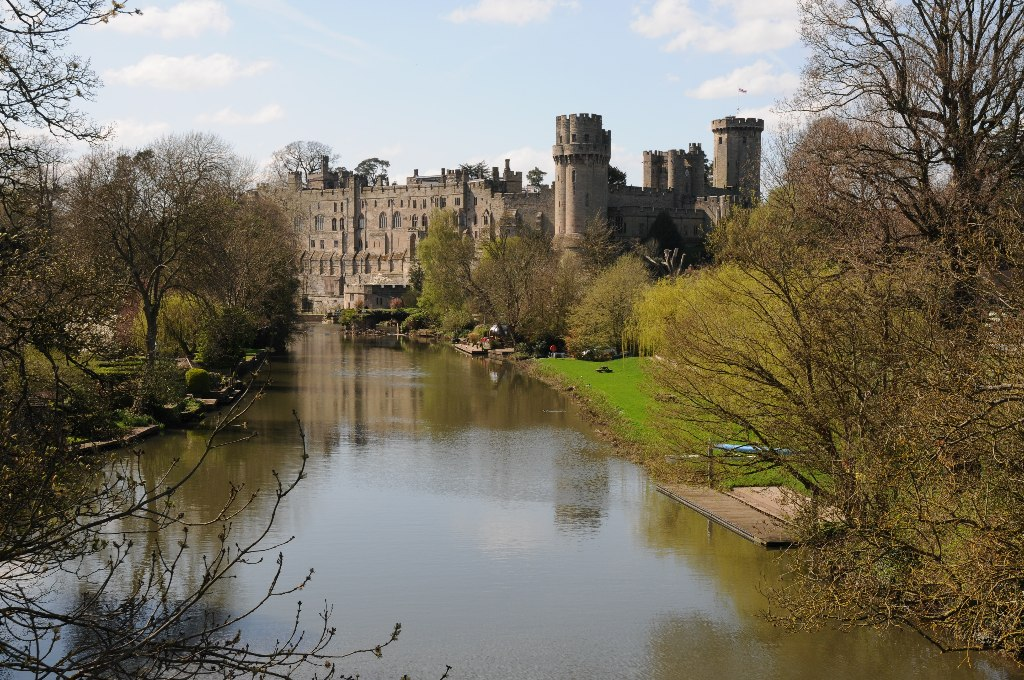
The Avon alongside Warwick Castle

== Proposed extension ==
There have been proposals to extend the navigation upstream from Alveston to a link with the Grand Union Canal at either Warwick or Leamington Spa. This was first considered by the Severn Trent Water Authority in 1974, who conducted a survey, the cost of which was partly funded by the Inland Waterways Association. This would open up a stretch of river that has never previously been navigable, but the proposal has not been universally welcomed. Landowners at Warwick Castle and Charlecote Park have attempted to claim the river as private property, although the 1636 Orders of Council state that the river was free to Coventry. Despite much local support, there is still some opposition to the scheme.

== Commercial traffic ==
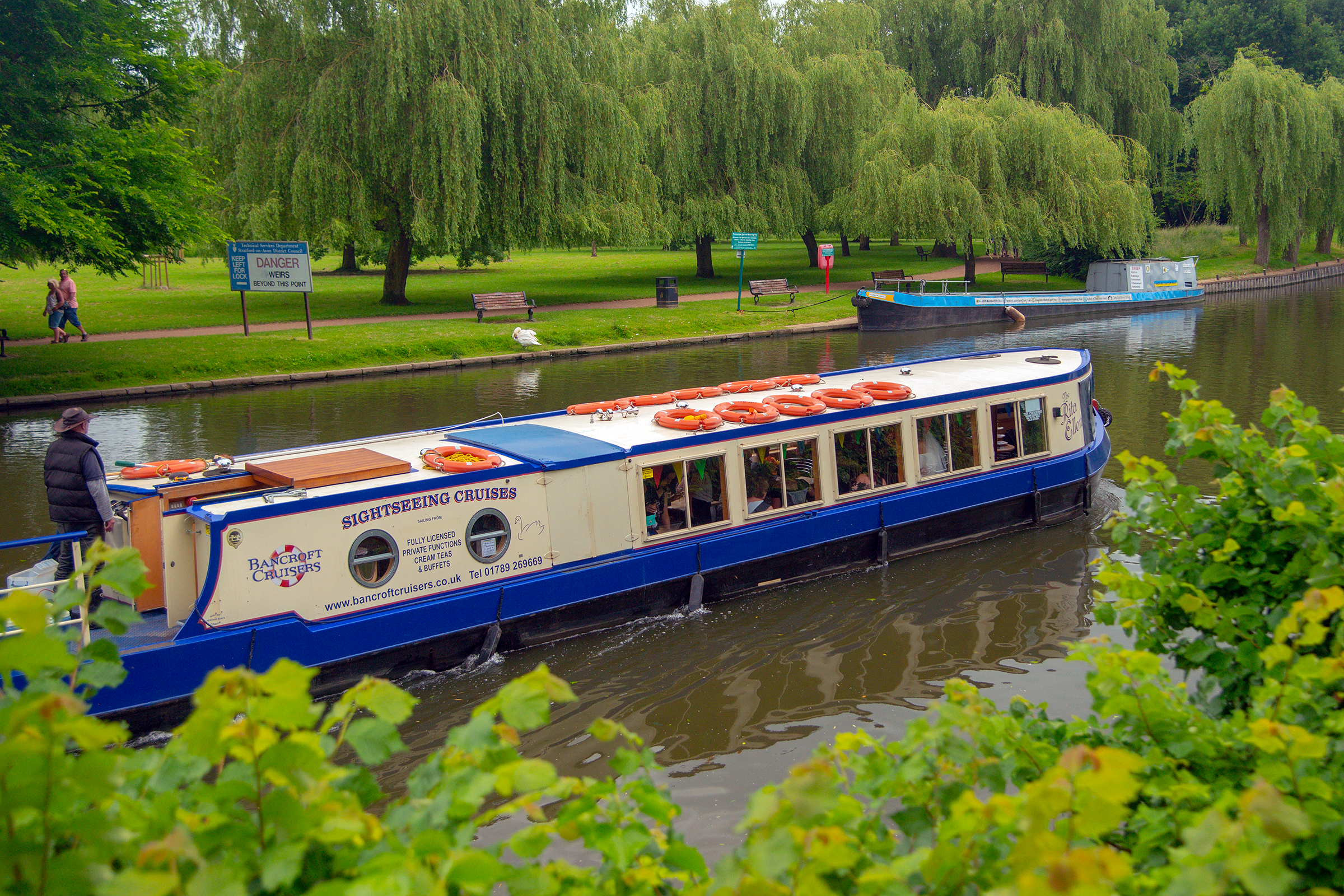
The river is also used by tour boats; Statford-upon-Avon

Commercial traffic returned to the Avon in May 2010, as part of a scheme to build flood defences at the town of Pershore, following flooding in 2007, which caused damage to a number of properties. Clay banks were constructed, with most of the material coming from Birlingham, further downstream. Some 15,000 tonnes of clay was excavated and transported by barge to the construction works. At Birlingham, the excavation was managed to create a wetland reserve for wildlife, with 32 acres (13 ha) of wet grassland and 5 acres (2 ha) of open water and reed beds. Worcestershire Wildlife Trust worked with the landowner to create the reserve, which is called the John Bennett Reserve. The use of barges to transport the clay was estimated to save 3,000 lorry trips between the two sites.

== Water quality ==
The Environment Agency measure the water quality of the river systems in England. Each is given an overall ecological status, which may be one of five levels: high, good, moderate, poor and bad. There are several components that are used to determine this, including biological status, which looks at the quantity and varieties of invertebrates, angiosperms and fish. Chemical status, which compares the concentrations of various chemicals against known safe concentrations, is rated good or fail.

The water quality of the River Avon was as follows in 2022.

Section	Ecological Status	Chemical Status	Length	Catchment	Channel
Avon (Warks) - source to Claycoton-Yelvertoft Bk	Poor	Fail	12.0 miles (19.3 km)	29.54 square miles (76.5 km^{2})	
Avon - ClaycotonYelvertoft Bk to conf R Sowe	Moderate	Fail	27.2 miles (43.8 km)	45.48 square miles (117.8 km^{2})	
Avon (Warks) - conf R Sowe to conf R Leam	Moderate	Fail	12.1 miles (19.5 km)	11.94 square miles (30.9 km^{2})	
Avon (Wark) conf R Leam to Tramway Br, Stratford	Moderate	Fail	23.3 miles (37.5 km)	36.55 square miles (94.7 km^{2})	
Avon- Tramway Br Stratford to Workman Br Evesham	Moderate	Fail	21.0 miles (33.8 km)	33.15 square miles (85.9 km^{2})	
Avon conf Workman Br, Evesham to conf R Severn	Moderate	Fail	33.8 miles (54.4 km)	36.74 square miles (95.2 km^{2})	heavily modified

Reasons for the water quality being less than good include run off from agricultural land and discharge from sewage treatment plants, both private and public, while the lower river is also affected by physical modification of the channel. Like most rivers in the UK, the chemical status changed from good to fail in 2019, due to the presence of polybrominated diphenyl ethers (PBDE), perfluorooctane sulphonate (PFOS) and mercury compounds, none of which had previously been included in the assessment.

== Sporting achievements ==
At 01:18 on Sunday 18 July 2021, 41 year old Craig Openshaw from Tewkesbury became the first person in the world to swim the entire length of the 47.1 mile Navigable River Avon; known as the 'Swim The Avon' project. Craig was supported by a four man land and boat crew consisting of Robert Stringer, Bob Bain, Joe Bawdon and Phil Leibrandt.

Despite being an ex-competitive pool swimmer, Craig had never taken part in open water swimming previously and the crew had never embarked on any similar challenges.

The team set off from Alveston Weir in Stratford-Upon-Avon at 20:00 on Friday 16 July 2021 and swam through the day and night to complete the 47.1 mile swim. The challenge was completed in 29 hours and 18 minutes.

Bob Bain also rowed the entire course as lead kayak, in memory of his late wife Gail Bain.

The swim captured the imagination of local communities along the river, with hundreds of spectators turning out to encourage the team.

Craig finished the world first swim following an intensive 3 month long training programme and completed all of his training in the river Avon. Permission to complete the swim was granted by the Avon Navigation Trust who verified the swim had never been previously completed.

The team raised a total of £17,800 for Cancer Research UK, with the challenge featuring on various news outlets such as BBC News.

== See also ==
- Other rivers named Avon
- River Severn
- Rivers of the United Kingdom
- Soft Flowing Avon

== Bibliography ==
- Cumberlidge, Jane (2009). Inland Waterways of Great Britain (8th ed.). Imray Laurie Norie and Wilson. ISBN 978-1-84623-010-3.
- Davies, Jamie (1996). Shakespeare's Avon: the history of a navigation. Headington, Oxon: Oakwood Press. ISBN 978-0-85361-490-6.
- Edwards, L. A. (1985). Inland Waterways of Great Britain (6th ed.). Imray Laurie Norie and Wilson. ISBN 978-0-85288-081-4.
- Hadfield, Charles; Norris, John (1968). Waterways to Stratford (2nd ed.). David and Charles. pp. 15–70. ISBN 978-0-7153-4231-2.
- Hadfield, Charles (1985). The Canals of the West Midlands. David and Charles. ISBN 978-0-7153-8644-6.
- King, Peter (July 2006). "The river Teme and other Midlands navigations". Journal of the Railway and Canal Historical Society. 35 (5).
- Marsh, Terry; Hannaford, Jamie (2008). UK Hydrometric Register (PDF). Natural Environment Research Council. ISBN 978-0-9557672-2-7. Archived from the original (PDF) on 31 October 2014.
- McKnight, Hugh (1981). Shell Book of Inland Waterways. David and Charles. ISBN 978-0-7153-8239-4.
- Nicholson (2006). Nicholsons Guide Vol 2: Severn Avon and Birmingham. Harper Collins Publishers. ISBN 978-0-00-721110-4.
- Owen, Sue; et al. (2005). Rivers and the British Landscape. Carnegie Publishing. ISBN 978-1-85936-120-7.
- Squires, Roger (2008). Britain's Restored Canals. Landmark Publishing. ISBN 978-1-84306-331-5.
