= Evesham railway station =

Railway station in Worcestershire, England

Evesham
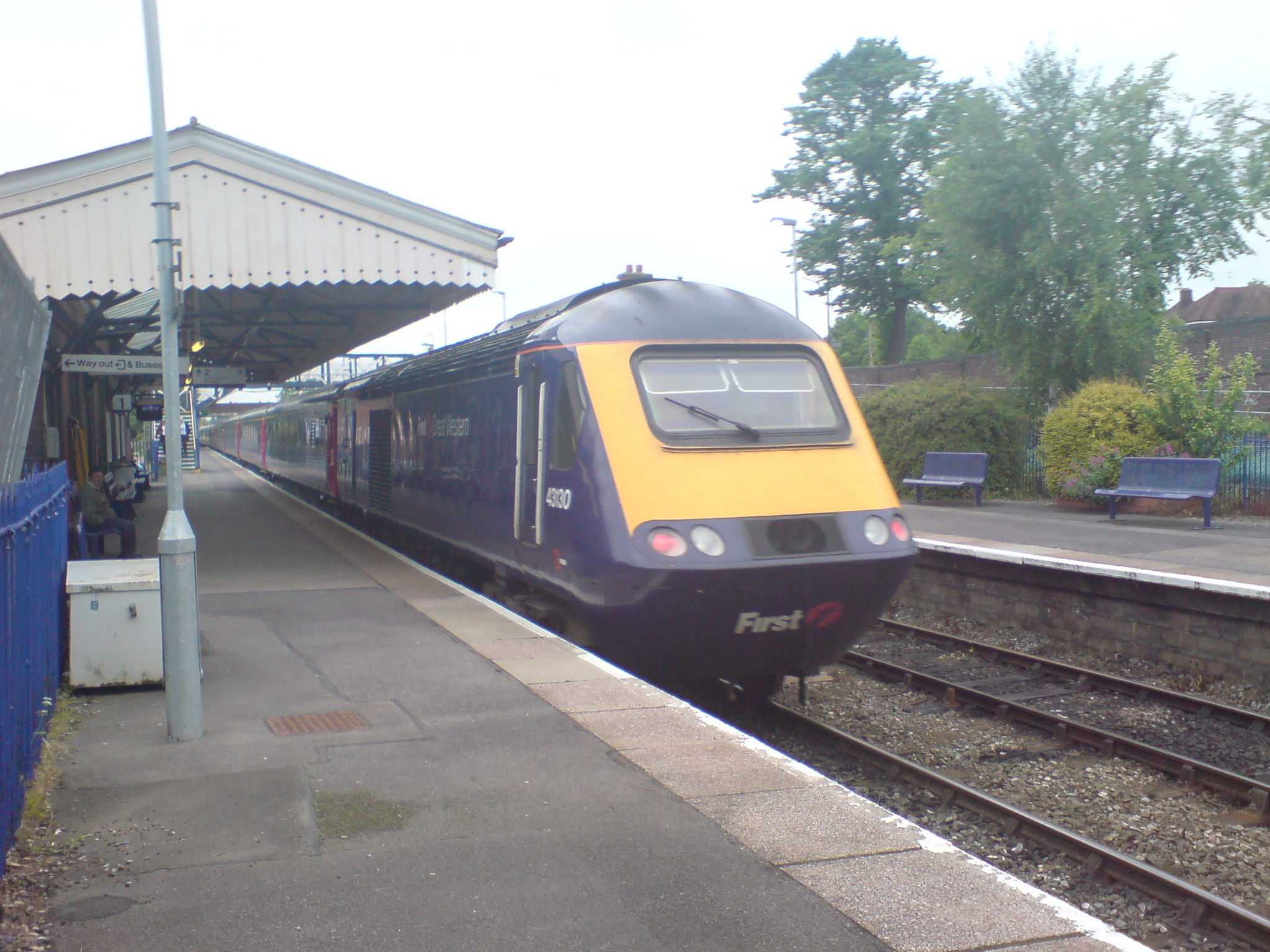
- HST Class 43 at Evesham railway station

General information
- Location: Evesham, Wychavon; England
- Coordinates: 52.0979°N 1.9474°W
- Grid reference: SP037444
- Manager: Great Western Railway
- Platforms: 2

Other information
- Station code: EVE
- Classification: DfT category E

History
- Original company: Oxford, Worcester and Wolverhampton Railway
- Pre-grouping: Great Western Railway
- Post-grouping: Great Western Railway

Key dates
- 1 May 1852: opened

Passengers
- 2020/21: ▼66,164
- 2021/22: ▲0.204 million
- 2022/23: ▲0.245 million
- 2023/24: ▲0.258 million
- 2024/25: ▲0.287 million
Location
Notes
- Passenger statistics from the Office of Rail and Road

Evesham railway station serves the market town of Evesham in Worcestershire, England. It is between Honeybourne and Pershore stations on the Cotswold Line between Oxford and Hereford via Worcester and Great Malvern. It is operated by Great Western Railway. Trains to London Paddington take about 1 hour 45 minutes.

== History ==
The first major section of the Oxford, Worcester and Wolverhampton Railway (OWW), between Evesham and Stourbridge Junction, opened to public traffic on 3 May 1852, the opening ceremony having been held on 1 May. Evesham was a terminus for just over a year, until the last major section of the OWW, from Evesham to Wolvercot Junction (to the north of Oxford), was opened on 4 June 1853. The OWW became the West Midland Railway in 1860, which in turn merged with the Great Western Railway in 1863.

On 11 November 1860 a luggage train collided with another which was stationary at Evesham station. Four carriages were badly damaged and the engine and tender were derailed. One of the drivers was badly scalded and taken to Worcester Infirmary.

On 21 October 1862 the 7.55pm express passenger train from Oxford to Worcester was passing through Evesham at 9.10pm at a speed of around 40 to 45 mph, it came into collision with three trucks west of the passenger platform. The driver of the train, Henry Crompton, was injured when the locomotive was derailed by the impact. The inquiry into the accident by Captain Tyler R.E. found that the foreman-porter James Callow or the horse-boy Daniel Langstone (aged 17) must have shunted the trucks onto the main line and then forgotten about them. The local magistrates fined the foreman-porter £10 and the horse boy £5.

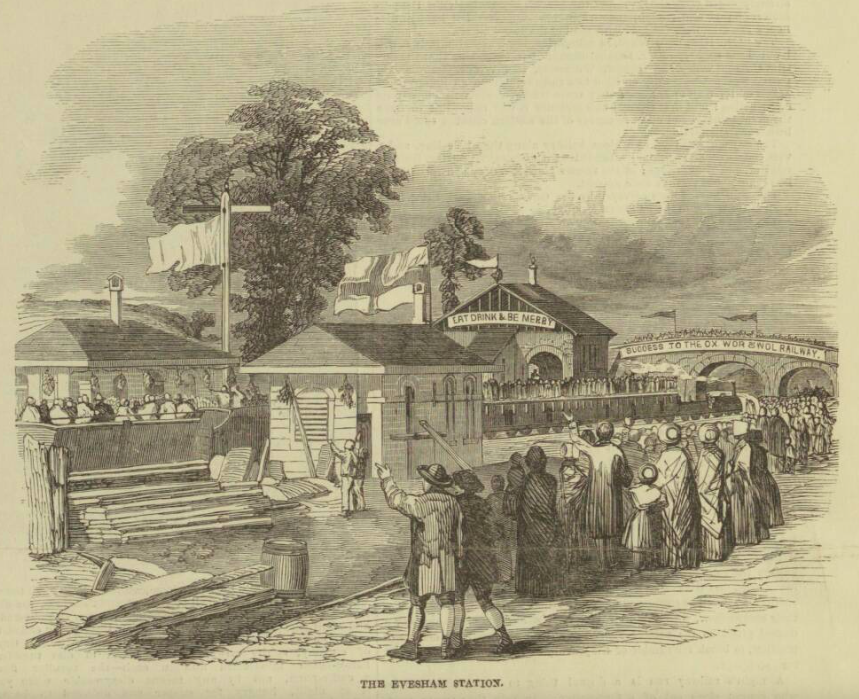
Opening of Evesham railway station from the Illustrated London News 8 May 1852

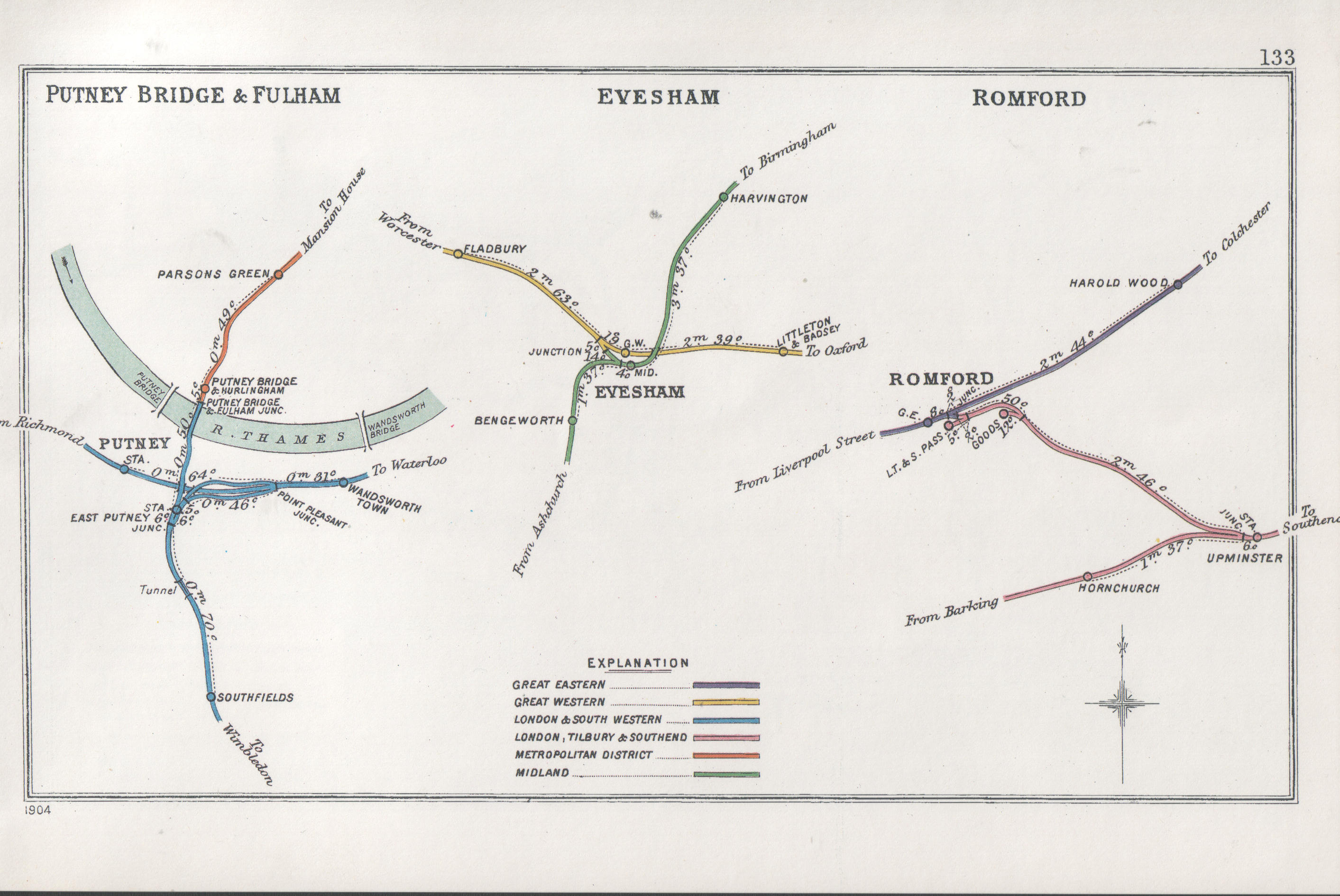
A 1904 Railway Clearing House Junction Diagram showing (centre) railways in the Evesham area. The present station is that on the yellow line, marked G.W.

Facing the present (former OWW) station across the car park is the former Midland Railway station of 1864 by the architect George Hunt on the Ashchurch to Barnt Green Evesham loop line.

On 2 June 1885, Mark Butler, under goods guard on the Midland Railway was crushed to death while coupling wagons at Evesham station. The inquest found that although coupling sticks were provided they were seldom used. Butler was caught by a buffer whilst going between them and the verdict was accidental death.

The stations were operated separately until 1932. It was then agreed to run them as a joint station when the G.W.R. stationmaster, E.T. Holloway took control of the G.W.R. and L.M.S. goods departments, and H.J. King the newly appointed station master at the L.M.S. station took full charge of passenger departments at the two stations. At the time of this arrangement, there were 47 staff in the passenger department alone.

The Midland station closed to passenger traffic in June 1963 and completely a year later. The original timber buildings from this station were taken to build Monsal Dale railway station in Derbyshire; the replacement stone structure still stands and is used for office accommodation. The rest of the site has been redeveloped as a housing estate.

== Services ==
Before December 2019, services at Evesham were irregular with gaps of between 40 mins and 2 hours between services.

As of December 2019, Great Western Railway now provide a more regular service to the station. The current off-peak service in trains per hour is:

- 1 tph to London Paddington
- 1 tph to Worcester Foregate Street of which some continue to Great Malvern and Hereford.

Preceding station	National Rail	Following station
Pershore	Great Western Railway; Cotswold Line	Honeybourne
	Historical railways	
Fladbury; Line open, station closed	Great Western Railway; Oxford, Worcester and Wolverhampton Railway	Littleton and Badsey; Line open, station closed
	Disused railways	
Bengeworth; Line and station closed	Midland Railway; Evesham loop line	Harvington; Line and station closed

== Bibliography ==
- Butt, R. V. J. (October 1995). The Directory of Railway Stations: details every public and private passenger station, halt, platform and stopping place, past and present (1st ed.). Sparkford: Patrick Stephens Ltd. ISBN 978-1-85260-508-7. OCLC 60251199. OL 11956311M.
- Jenkins, Stanley C; Quayle, HL (1977). The Oxford, Worcester & Wolverhampton Railway. The Oakwood Library of Railway History. Blandford: Oakwood Press. OL40.
- Mitchell, Vic; Smith, Keith (2006). Cheltenham to Redditch. Middleton Press. figs. 44-54. ISBN 9781904474814. OCLC 851839542.
