= List of works by Wulfstan of York =

Wulfstan II, Archbishop of York wrote some works in Latin, and numerous works in Old English, then the vernacular. He has also been credited with a few short poems. His works can generally be divided into homiletic, legal, and philosophical (or socio-political) categories.

== Homiletic ==
'Block' 1 ("Eschatological Homilies")

- De Anticristo (Latin, Bethurum Ia)
- De Anticristo (Old English, Bethurum Ib)
- Lectio Sancti Evangelii Secundum Matheum (Old English, Bethurum II)
- Secundum Lucam (Old English, Bethurum III)
- De Temporibus Anticristi (Old English, Bethurum IV)
- Secundum Marcum (Old English, Bethurum V)

'Block' 2 ("The Christian Faith")

- Incipiunt Sermones Lupi Episcopi (Old English, Bethurum VI)
- De Fide Catholica (Old English, Bethurum VII)
- To Eallum Folke (Old English, Bethurum VIIa)
- Incipit de Baptisma (Latin, Bethurum VIIIa)
- Dominica Quaterna vel Quando Volueris (Old English, Bethurum VIIIb)
- Sermo de Baptismate (Old English, Bethurum VIIIc)
- De Septiformi Spiritu (Old English, Bethurum IX; a reworking of a homily by Ælfric)
- De Regula Canonicorum (Old English, Bethurum Xa; a translation of chapter 145 of the 816 Council of Aachen)
- De Cristianitate (Latin, Bethurum Xb)
- Her Ongynð Be Cristendome (Old English, Bethurum XC; a reworking of Xa and Xb)
- Incipit de Visione Isaie Prophete Quam Vidit Super Idam et Hierusalem (Latin & Old English, Bethurum XI)
- De Falsis Deis (Old English, Bethurum XII; a reworking of a homily by Ælfric)

'Block' 3 ("Archiepiscopal Functions")

- Sermo ad Populum (Old English, Bethurum XIII)
- Sermo in Quadragesima (Old English, Bethurum XIV)
- Sermo de Cena Domini (Old English, Bethurum XV)
- Verba Ezechielis Prophete de Pastoribus non recte Agentibus (Latin, Bethurum XVIa)
- Verba Ezechielis Prophete de Pigris aut Timidis vel Negligentibus Pastoribus (Old English, Bethurum XVIb; a translation of XVIa)
- Lectio Secundum Lucam (Old English, Bethurum XVII)
- De Dedicatione Ecclesiae (Old English, Bethurum XVIII)

'Block' 4 ("Evil Days")

- Be Godcundre Warnunge (Old English, Bethurum XIX)
- Sermo Lupi ad Anglos (Old English, Bethurum XX; in multiple versions written at different times)
- Her is gyt Rihtlic Warnung ond Soðlic Myngung Ðeode to Ðearfe (Old English, Bethurum XXI)

Miscellaneous

- Untitled (Napier I)
- Untitled (Napier XXIII)
- Untitled (Napier XXIV)
- To Folce (Napier XXV)
- To Eallum Folce (Napier XXVII)
- Be Mistlican Gelimpan (Napier XXXV)
- To Eallum Folce (Napier XXXVI)
- Her Is Gyt Oþer Wel God Eaca (Napier XXXVIII)
- ?Ðis Man Gerædde, đa se Micela Here Com to Lande (Napier XXXIX)
- Larspel and Scriftboc (Napier XLVII; first part only)
- ?Larspel (Napier L)
- To Eallan Folke (Napier LI)
- To Mæssepreostum (Napier LII)
- To Mæssepreostum (Napier LIII)
- Sermo Lupi (Napier LIX)
- Be Hæðendome (Napier LX)
- Be Cristendome (Napier LXI)

- ?Admonitio episcoporum utilis (Latin; ed. Hall; in two versions)
- ?Admonitio spiritalis doctrinae (Latin; ed. Cross)
- ?Contra iniquos iudices et falsos testes (Latin; ed. Hall)
- ?De adiutorio Dei et libero arbitrio (Latin; ed. Hall)
- ?De blasphemia (Latin; ed. Elliot )
- ?De coniugio antiquo (Latin; ed. Cross-Hamer)
- ?De conversione et penitentia et communione (Latin; ed. Hall)
- ?De decimis dandis (Latin; ed. Hall)
- ?De diversitate ordinum (Latin; ed. Elliot )
- ?De dominis et seruis (Latin; ed. Hall)
- ?De ieiunio quattuor temporum (Latin; ed. Cross)
- ?De paenitentia communi pro quacumque tribulatione (Latin; ed. Elliot )
- ?De pastore et praedicatore (Latin; ed. Elliot )
- ?De rapinis ecclesiasticarum rerum (Latin; ed. Cross; in two versions)
- ?De resurrectione mortuorum (Latin; ed. Hall)
- ?De veneratione sacerdotum (Latin; ed. Elliot ; in multiple versions)
- ?In nomine Domini (Latin; ed. di Sciacca)
- ?Sermo ad coniugatos et filios (Latin; ed. Hall)
- ?Sermo ad viduas (Latin; ed. Hall)
- ?Sermo sancti Augustini de baptismo non iterando (Latin; ed. Hall)

== Legal ==
- Episcopus (Old English)
- The Laws of Edward and Guthrum (Old English)
- ?The Northumbrian Priests' Law (Old English)
- The Canons of Edgar (Old English)
- ?Collectio canonum Wigorniensis (Latin; a.k.a. Wulfstan's Canon Law Collection, or the Excerptiones pseudo-Ecgberhti)
- Ethelred's legislation, 1008, King's Enham (Latin & Old English; survives as VAtr, VIAtr, VIAtrLat, XAtr)
- Að (Old English)
- Mircna laga (Old English)
- Norðleoda laga (Old English)
- Ethelred's legislation, ca. 1009, Bath (Latin, VIIaAtr)
- Hadbot (Old English)
- Geþyncðo (Old English)
- Grið (Old English)
- Ethelred's legislation, 1014 (Old English, VIIIAtr, ?IXAtr)
- Cnut's legislation, 1018 (Old English, Cn 1018)
- Cnut's legislation, 1020 (Old English, Cn 1020)
- Cnut's legislation (secular), ca. 1021 (Old English, ICn)
- Cnut's legislation (ecclesiastical), ca. 1021 (Old English, IICn)

He also made revisions to

- King Athelstan's tithe ordinance (IAs)
- Edmund's London code (IEm)
- Edgar's Andover code (II-IIIEg)

== Philosophical ==
- The Institutes of Polity (Old English)
  - As divided by Karl Jost (1959), analysed as an original and revised version:
    - The Institutes of Polity I (original version)
    - The Institutes of Polity II (revision)
  - As divided by Andrei Crișan (2024), named by manuscript:
    - Corpus Institutes of Polity
    - Junius Institutes of Polity
    - Nero Institutes of Polity

== Poetical ==
- Qui legis hunc titulum (Latin; verses praising Wulfstan)
- Poem on King Edgar's Succession (Old English; Anglo-Saxon Chronicle E, s.a. 959)
- Poem on King Edward's Succession (Old English; Anglo-Saxon Chronicle D, s.a. 975)
