= Hemming's Cartulary =

11th-century English manuscript

- Liber Wigorniensis and Hemming's Cartulary proper
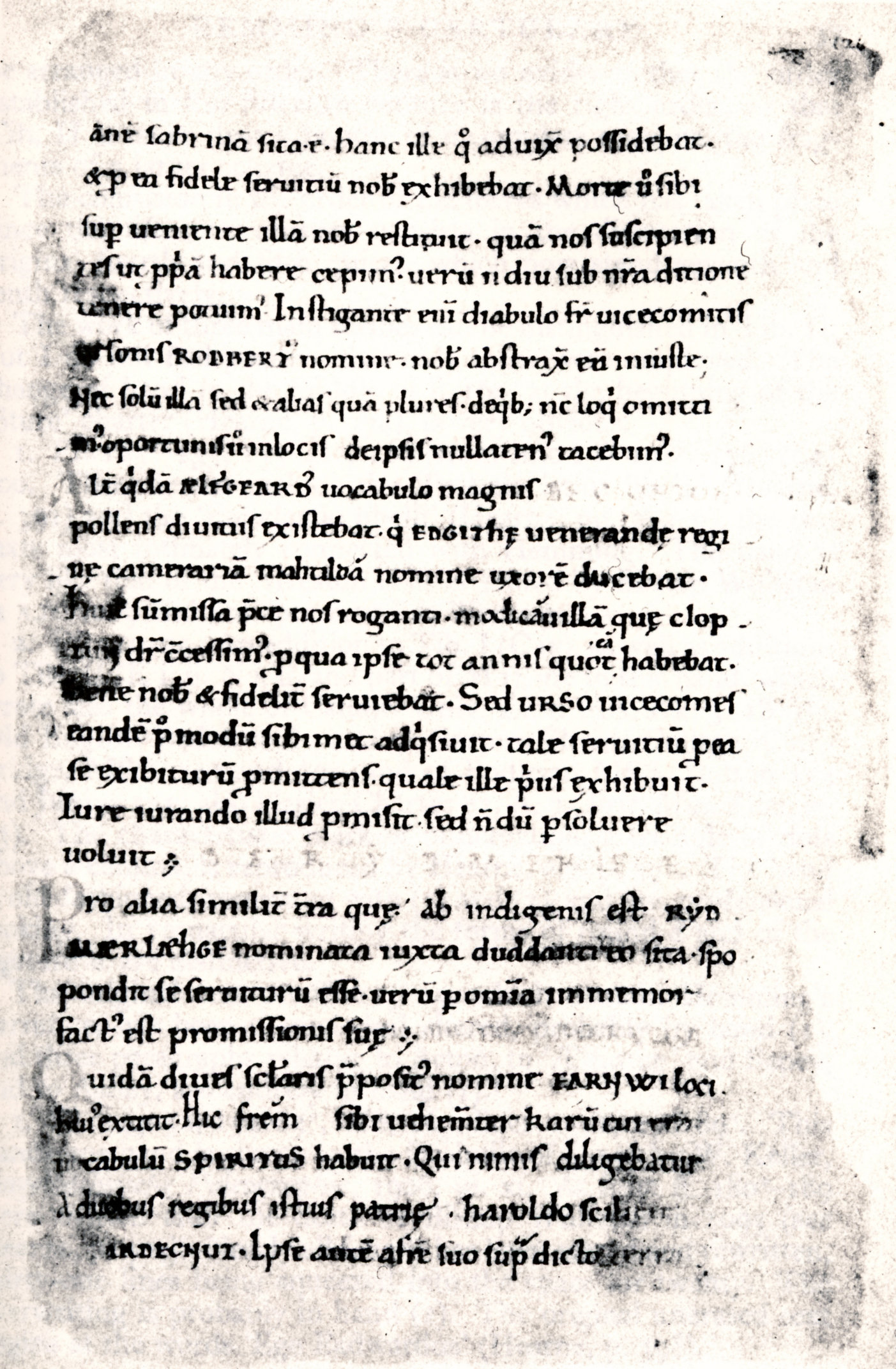
- Page from Hemming's Cartulary, folio 121 of the manuscript
- Author(s): Hemming (2nd part)
- Language: medieval Latin, Old English
- Date: mostly 996 x 1016 (Liber Wigorniensis); late 11th / early 12th century (2nd part)
- Provenance: Worcester Cathedral
- Authenticity: contains some spurious charters
- Manuscript(s): Cotton Tiberius A xiii
- First printed edition: 1723 by Thomas Hearne
- Genre: Cartulary
- Length: 197 leaves total
- Subject: Charters of Worcester Cathedral
- Period covered: 10th and 11th century

Hemming's Cartulary is a manuscript cartulary, or collection of charters and other land records, collected by a monk named Hemming around the time of the Norman Conquest of England. The manuscript comprises two separate cartularies, made at different times and later bound together; it is in the British Library as MS Cotton Tiberius A xiii. The first was composed at the end of the 10th or beginning of the 11th century. The second section was compiled by Hemming and was written around the end of the 11th or the beginning of the 12th century. The first section, traditionally titled the Liber Wigorniensis, is a collection of Anglo-Saxon charters and other land records, most of which are organized geographically. The second section, Hemming's Cartulary proper, combines charters and other land records with a narrative of the deprivation of property owned by the church of Worcester.

The two works are bound together in one surviving manuscript, the earliest surviving cartulary from medieval England. A central theme is the losses Worcester suffered at the hands of royal officials and local landowners. Included amongst the despoilers are kings such as Cnut and William the Conqueror, and nobles such as Eadric Streona and Urse d'Abetot. Also included are accounts of lawsuits brought by the Worcester monks to regain their lost lands. The two sections of the cartulary were first printed in 1723. The original manuscript was slightly damaged by fire in 1731 and required rebinding.

== Authorship and composition ==
Although the monk Hemming has traditionally been credited with all the works in the manuscript, the cartulary contains two works that were collected together, only one of which is by Hemming. The two works were bound together to form the manuscript (abbreviated MS) Cotton Tiberius A xiii, now held in the Cotton library, a collection in the British Library. Together, the two works form the first surviving cartulary from medieval England. The first part is the so-called Liber Wigorniensis, or Book of Worcester, which takes up folios 1–118 of the manuscript. The second is Hemming's work, and takes up folios 119–142, 144–152, and 154–200. MS Cotton Nero E i and British Library MS Add 46204 may also contain charters collected as part of Hemming's work, as they have been identified by some scholars as having been produced during Hemming's lifetime, although others identify them as a copy of the Liber Wigorniensis.

=== Manuscript condition ===
The original manuscript containing the cartulary was damaged in the Ashburnham House fire of 1731, but the damage was not serious. The edges of the manuscript were burned, resulting in a few words being lost at the margins. Because of the fire damage, the manuscript was rebound in the 19th century, and each leaf was mounted separately. In addition to the two main sections, there are three smaller parchment pages bound in with the manuscript: folios 110, 143, and 153. The first of them, folio 110, measures 70 millimetres (2.8 in) high by 90 millimetres (3.5 in) wide and lists eight names, probably witnesses to a lease. The second inserted folio, 143, measures 130 millimetres (5.1 in) high by 180 millimetres (7.1 in) wide and lists jurors in a late 11th-century hand. The last inserted folio, 153, measures 58 millimetres (2.3 in) high by 180 millimetres (7.1 in) wide and gives the boundaries of a manor in Old English, rather than Latin; it is written in a 12th-century hand.

=== Liber Wigorniensis ===
The first part of the work is an early 11th-century collection of older charters, arranged geographically, with a section on late 10th-century land leases tacked on the end. The historian H. P. R. Finberg gave this section of the work the title Liber Wigorniensis in 1961 to distinguish it from the later section actually assembled by Hemming. Dates for the compilation of the work include the suggestion by historian Neil Ker that it dates from between 1002 and 1016, when Wulfstan (the earlier Wulfstan – later a saint – who is not the Wulfstan who encouraged Hemming to compile the cartulary) held both the archbishopric of York and the bishopric of Worcester. Another historian, V. H. Galbraith, suggests that instead of being compiled in Wulfstan's episcopate, it was created during the episcopate of Ealdwulf, Wulfstan's predecessor in both sees. A third historian, David Dumville, argues that because no leases later than 996 are mentioned, it must date to a time frame between 996 and 1016. There are 155 charters in the Liber, of which 10 are later insertions; the date of their incorporation ranges from the early to the late 11th century. Ker, who studied the original manuscript, has identified five main scribes involved in the manuscript in the first section. The scribal hands used are small and not very rounded, and resemble the type of writing prevalent in England during the early part of the 11th century. This section consists of 117 leaves in the original manuscript, each page with 26 lines of text. The written area is approximately 190 millimetres (7.5 in) tall by 100 millimetres (3.9 in) wide. A few blank areas in the original manuscript copy have been filled with information in the later 11th and 12th centuries, mainly related to properties owned by the cathedral.

=== Hemming's cartulary proper ===
Hemming was the author of the second and later part, a collection of lands and rights belonging to the cathedral chapter of Worcester, as well as a narrative of the deeds of Wulfstan, the Bishop of Worcester who died in 1095, and Archbishop Ealdred of York. In this part of the work is a preface known as the Enucleatio libelli, where Hemming names himself as the person responsible for compiling the work, and names Wulfstan as the inspiration for his work. Another section, known as the Prefatio istius libelli, now much later in the manuscript but possibly meant as an introduction to the Codicellus, is a shorter introduction that gives the purpose of the collection. Historians usually take the two prefaces to mean that Wulfstan commissioned the work, but it is unclear whether it was created before or after Wulfstan's death. It may have been produced during the vacancy after Wulfstan's death, and before the appointment of the next bishop, Samson. Historian Nicholas Brooks, along with Vivian Galbraith, argues that Hemming's work was a response to the problems encountered by the diocese during the vacancy, when royal officials administered the lands of the bishopric. According to Brooks, the claim that Wulfstan ordered the composition of the cartulary was inaccurate and was made to appeal to the authority of the bishop. The historian Julia Barrow believes that the inspiration for the work was the creation of the Domesday Book in 1086, although she agrees that the work was completed after Wulfstan's death. Hemming's work contains over 50 charters, some of which are duplicates of ones in the Liber.

The second section of the work is not just a collection of deeds and charters but includes other historical information of importance, especially for Hemming's monastery. The documents are connected by a narrative explaining why and how the cartulary was created; the narrative is usually given the title of Codicellus possessionum. This section of the work also includes the Life of the later Wulfstan, one of two contemporary records of Wulfstan's life. (Note: The other record the Vita Wulfstani written by William of Malmesbury during the early 12th century, which is a translation of a work by Coleman, Wulfstan's chaplain.) The organization is broadly geographical, with some information grouped by topic. In two sections, which are sometimes entitled "Indiculum Libertatis" and "Oswald's Indiculum", the work not only draws on charters but also incorporates regional information from a different type of source recording the holdings of tenants-in-chief. This has been identified as the documentation assembled at the shire-courts for the so-called Domesday survey, commissioned by William the Conqueror in 1085. More famously, the same records were later used for the compilation of Domesday Book. Some of the documents are in Latin, others are in Old English. Ker has identified the second part of the manuscript as being created by three scribes, describing their writing as "round and fairly large", in a style belonging to a period of transition between the late 11th and early 12th century. There are 80 leaves in the original manuscript. Most pages in this section of the manuscript have 28 lines of writing, and the written area is approximately 190 millimetres (7.5 in) high by 108 millimetres (4.3 in) wide. A few blank areas in the original manuscript were filled with information ranging from contemporary notes on landholdings of the cathedral to notes on the dissolution of Worcester Priory in the 16th century.

== Themes and contents ==
Both the Liber Wigorniensis and Hemming's work contain a number of forged charters. The historian Julia Barrow has determined that at least 25 of the 155 charters in the Liber are forged, but cautions that this is the minimum estimate. Barrow identifies more than 30 of the charters in Hemming's work as forgeries, including some that are duplicates from the Liber. Some of the stories that form Hemming's narrative do not always agree with other sources, and Ker says "it is safer to trust to the main facts than to the details of his [Hemming's] stories".

=== Contents of the Liber Wigorniensis ===
The main goal of the Liber was to document the landholdings of the diocese and bishop, and to keep a register of the written charters and leases pertaining to the property of the church at Worcester. Because there is no narrative tying the documents together, the Liber should be seen as a working document, compiled for the use of the bishop and monks, and designed not as a literary work but a legal one. The Liber was revised during its working life, which adds further support for the working nature of the composition.

The charters constitute valuable evidence for prosopographical research and the study of land tenure in late Anglo-Saxon England. According to Donald A. Bullough, they also offer a window on the kind of social bonds which could be created by "neighbourhood". In the 10th century, the Bishop of Worcester leased out various small estates attached to the Church in the three counties (Worcestershire, Gloucestershire and Warwickshire) to several high-ranking men and women, usually for three lifespans. The pattern may be taken to suggest that this way of association served to "create a network, an inter-meshing, of high-status 'neighbours' ... with its central knot in Worcester and the domus of the bishop". In the bishop's residence or at home, the lessees may have come together to participate in convivial drinking, just as the Norman successors to these lands are envisaged as doing in William of Malmesbury's Life of St Wulfstan. Further, some of the thegns served in the royal army (fyrd) under the command of Bishop Oswald or his successors, which presupposes the creation of a personal warband and possibly one with the secondary purpose of protecting the bishop's properties.

=== Hemming's work ===
==== Purpose ====
Hemming's introduction to his work (Prefatio) claims that it was produced to teach Wulfstan's successors:

about the things which have been committed to their care, and to show them which lands justly belong (or ought to belong) to the church, and which have been unjustly seized by evil men—first, during the Danish invasions; later, by unjust royal officials and tax collectors; and most recently, by the violence of Normans in our own time, who by force, guile and rapine have unjustly deprived this holy church of its lands, villages and possessions, until hardly anything is safe from their depredations.

The historian Richard Southern argues that, notwithstanding the stated aim of the work, it was not intended for use in lawsuits but rather as a kind of utopian picture of the past. The goal was to depict those things that were beyond human recovery but that were "laid up in heaven". Because of its narrative structure, it should be seen not only as a documentation of the various landholdings of the diocese, but as a historical work as well. Unlike the Liber, it was not revised as the property changed hands, and this lack of revision has been seen as emphasizing the work's commemorative nature. The historian John Reuben Davies sees a close parallel between Hemming's work and the Welsh medieval document The Book of Llandaf. Other similar works were the Norman pancartes, which were compilations of gifts to a monastery, connected by a narrative which was then presented to the dukes to secure confirmation of the gifts. These Norman works date from the early 11th century, and like Hemming's work, they are of great interest to the historian as sources for the study of medieval history. Also noting that Hemming's part of the compilation does not appear to have been revised or updated to meet new circumstances, Patrick Geary describes it as "a commemorative, historical volume, not a working administrative tool" and associates the work with counterparts produced in the continental West, such as Folcuin's chronicle cartulary Gesta abbatum S. Bertini Sithiensium.

More recently, Francesca Tinti has arrived at a different conclusion, arguing instead that Hemming's work, more so than the Liber Wigorniensis, came to serve very real needs, and that these specifically concerned the monastic community at Worcester. Although the Prefatio is silent about monks, the Enucleatio is explicit that Bishop Wulfstan had commissioned the work to defend the estates assigned for the sustenance of the monks (ad victum monachorum). She relates these concerns to the rapid growth of the community during Bishop Wulfstan's episcopate in the second half of the 11th century. (Note: One of the bishop's charters included in the work states that the number of monks had gone up from 12 to 50.) The coming of the Norman newcomer, Samson, who had been involved in the dissolution of Westbury-on-Trym, would have given the enlarged community a particular incentive to safeguard its property and rights.

==== Contents ====
One of the themes of Hemming's work is the depredations suffered by his monastery at the hands of royal officials. One such notorious official from the last decade of King Æthelred's reign is Eadric Streona ("Grasper"), ealdorman of Mercia, blamed for having appropriated land held by the church in Gloucestershire and Wiltshire and for having incorporated the ancient county of Winchcombeshire into Gloucestershire. Hemming may have invented Eadric's byname of Streona, as it is not attested before appearing in Hemming's work.

Hemming singles out the conquests of England by Cnut and William the Conqueror as being especially damaging. He claims that the work only covers the lost estates that were assigned to support the cathedral chapter, but as he describes the loss of several manors that were listed in Domesday Book as belonging to the bishop, the work probably covers more than the author claims. It also contains a listing of amounts paid to King William to regain items the king had taken from the diocese. Worcester paid over 45.5 marks of gold to recover their belongings. Others singled out in the work as significant plunderers of Worcester's lands included Leofric, Earl of Mercia, and other members of his family.

The historian Ted Johnson Smith points out that the Codicellus has strong parallels to the Historia de Sancto Cuthberto. The Historia was written in Durham in the mid-10th century, and is a history of the monastery of St. Cuthbert from the foundation until about 945. Like the Codicellus, it is a narrative concerned mainly to defend the patrimony of the monks against depredations.

Also contained in Hemming's work is a description of the lawsuit between the diocese of Worcester and Evesham Abbey, which took place between 1078 and 1085. Although only Hemming relates the course of the proceedings, the Chronicon Abbatiae de Evesham, or Evesham Chronicle, also gives background information on the dispute. The litigation involved lands that the abbey held in Hampton and Bengeworth in Worcestershire, but that the diocese maintained were actually part of one of the bishopric's manors. Ownership became disputed under the abbacy of Æthelwig, when the abbot managed to acquire the allegiance of a number of the new owners of lands previously held from the diocese. After Æthelwig's death, most of these lands passed to Odo of Bayeux, but Evesham managed to retain Hampton and Bengeworth, which became the basis of the dispute. The lawsuit was complicated because part of the land had been granted by an earlier bishop, Beorhtheah, to a kinsman, Azur. After the Conquest, Azur's lands were given to Urse d'Abetot, the Sheriff of Worcester. Following Æthelwig's death, Wulfstan was able to secure a settlement with Æthelwig's successor Walter. The settlement, concluded in 1086, granted the lands to the abbey, but the diocese remained the overlord, for which the abbey owed military service.

=== Contents of the manuscript ===
A brief overview of the contents of the manuscript follows, with the main sectioning and a general idea of the contents of each section.

Folios	Section of manuscript usually classified as	Contents
1–21	Liber Wigorniensis	28 documents headed by the title "Into Vveogerna Cestre", followed by miscellaneous documents on three pages
22–27	Liber Wigorniensis	8 documents headed by the title "Into Vvincelcvmbe Scire"
28–32	Liber Wigorniensis	8 documents headed by the title "Into Oxena Forda Scire", followed by miscellaneous documents on twelve pages
28–38	Liber Wigorniensis	8 documents headed by the title "Into Oxena Forda Scire", followed by miscellaneous documents on twelve pages
39–46	Liber Wigorniensis	7 documents headed by the title "Into Gleawescestre Scire", followed by miscellaneous documents on twelve pages
47–56	Liber Wigorniensis	14 documents with no heading, mainly relating to Gloucestershire
57–102	Liber Wigorniensis	Leases
103–109	Liber Wigorniensis	8 documents headed by the title "Into Waernincg Wican", followed by a page with one miscellaneous document
110	Inserted smaller parchment page	Listing of 8 names
111–113	Liber Wigorniensis	Leases
114–118	Liber Wigorniensis	Miscellaneous documents, including an Old English homily, lists of the bishops of Worcester, kings of Mercia, and land records
119–126	Hemming's Cartulary	Codicellus possessionum
127–134	Hemming's Cartulary	More Codicellus possessionum; Enucleatio libelli; "Indiculum libertatis" (later document on the privileges of the Oswaldslow hundred)
135–142	Hemming's Cartulary	"Oswald's Indiculum" (on services due from Oswald of Worcester's lessees); record of an agreement between Wulfstan of Worcester and Abbot Walter of Evesham (later); excerpt from Domesday Book (later)
143	Inserted smaller parchment page	11th-century listing of jurors
144–152	Hemming's Cartulary	Charters
153	Inserted smaller parchment page	12th-century list of boundaries of a manor in Old English
154–164	Hemming's Cartulary	Some charters; Old English boundary-clauses (later)
165–166	Miscellaneous	Table of contents in a 15th-century hand of both the Liber Wigorniensis and Hemming's Cartulary
167–175	Hemming's Cartulary	Regnal list, with list of royal gifts to the monastic community; charters
176	Hemming's Cartulary	List of bishops of Worcester, with their gifts to the monastic community; Prefatio; list of charters
177	Inserted smaller parchment page	Listing of taxes levied by King William in Old English and a list of holders of land eligible for the geld in Worcestershire shortly after Domesday Book
178–200	Hemming's Cartulary	History of estates retrieved for the monks by Ealdred and Wulfstan, with charters (some added later); charters

== Manuscript and publication history ==
The only other 11th-century cartulary surviving from England is the Oswald cartulary, also compiled at Worcester. Historian M. T. Clanchy has suggested that the form English cartularies took may have originated at Worcester, although fellow historian Robin Fleming has argued that Christ Church Canterbury's surviving cartulary is also an 11th-century compilation. Who owned the manuscript after it left Worcester Cathedral Priory, presumably with the Dissolution of the Monasteries in the 1540s, is unknown, but the manuscript was in the possession of Robert Cotton by 1612, when it is recorded as being loaned by Cotton to Arthur Agarde. There are annotations in the manuscript by John Joscelyn, who was secretary to Matthew Parker (d. 1575), the Elizabethan Archbishop of Canterbury, but whether Parker owned the manuscript is uncertain. (Note: Parker was noted for keeping many of the manuscripts his staff annotated, but he did not keep all of them, as another Worcester Priory document, now Bodleian Library Junius 121 was also annotated by Parker, but remained at Worcester until the 17th century.) The manuscript thus became part of the Cotton library, which passed into public ownership in 1702 on the death of Cotton's grandson, based on an act of Parliament of 1701. The manuscript itself is now part of the British Library's holdings.

The manuscript was originally published in 1723 as Hemingi chartularium ecclesiæ Wigorniensis, in two volumes edited by Thomas Hearne. This was part of the Chronica Anglia series put out between 1709 and 1735, which included many chronicles and records in 20 volumes. Hearne printed his edition from a transcription made for the antiquary Richard Graves. This transcript, known as MS Rawlinson B.445, is not a completely accurate transcription of the Cotton Tiberius manuscript, as some items were omitted, and marginalia were not always transcribed. There were also some additions of decorations.

The entire manuscript of Cotton Tiberius A xiii is catalogued as number 366 in Helmut Gneuss's work Handlist of Anglo-Saxon Manuscripts.

== Bibliography ==
- Barlow, Frank (1988). The Feudal Kingdom of England 1042–1216 (Fourth ed.). New York: Longman. ISBN 0-582-49504-0.
- Barrow, Julia (2005). "The Chronology of Forgery Production at Worcester from c. 1000 to the Early Twelfth Century". In Brooks, Nicholas; Barrow, Julia (eds.). St. Wulfstan and His World. Aldershot, UK: Ashgate. pp. 105–122. ISBN 0-7546-0802-6.
- Baxter, Stephen (2007). The Earls of Mercia: Lords and Power in Late Anglo-Saxon England. Oxford, UK: Oxford University Press. ISBN 978-0-19-923098-3.
- Brooks, Nicholas (2005). "Introduction". In Brooks, Nicholas; Barrow, Julia (eds.). St. Wulfstan and His World. Aldershot, UK: Ashgate. pp. 1–21. ISBN 0-7546-0802-6.
- Bullough, D.A. (1990). Friends, Neighbours and Fellow-drinkers: Aspects of Community and Conflict in the Early Medieval West. H.M. Chadwick Memorial Lectures. Vol. 1. Cambridge, UK: University of Cambridge. ISBN 0-9517339-0-7.
- Clanchy, M. T. (1993). From Memory to Written Record: England 1066–1307 (Second ed.). Malden, MA: Blackwell Publishing. ISBN 978-0-631-16857-7.
- Davies, John Reuben (2003). The Book of Llandaf and the Norman Church in Wales. Studies in Celtic History. Woodbridge, UK: Boydell Press. ISBN 1-84383-024-8.
- Fleming, Robin (1997). "Christ Church Canterbury's Anglo-Norman Cartulary". In Hollister, C. Warren (ed.). Anglo-Norman Political Culture and the 12th Century Renaissance: Proceedings of the Borchard Conference on Anglo-Norman History 1995. Woodbridge, UK: Boydell Press. pp. 83–107. ISBN 0-85115-691-6.
- Geary, Patrick J. (1994). Phantoms of Remembrance: Memory and Oblivion at the End of the First Millennium. Princeton, NJ: Princeton University Press. ISBN 978-0-691-03422-5.
- Gneuss, Helmut (2001). Handlist of Anglo-Saxon Manuscripts: A List of Manuscripts and Manuscript Fragments Written or Owned in England up to 1100. Medieval and Renaissance Texts and Studies. Vol. 241. Tempe, AZ: Arizona Center for Medieval and Renaissance Studies. ISBN 0-86698-283-3.
- Graham, Timothy (2006). "Matthew Parker's Manuscripts: An Elizabethan Library and its Use". In Leedham-Green, Elisabeth; Webber, Teresa (eds.). The Cambridge History of Libraries in Britain and Ireland: Volume I to 1640. Cambridge, UK: Cambridge University Press. pp. 322–334. ISBN 978-0-521-78194-7.
- Gransden, Antonia (1974). Historical Writing in England c. 550-c. 1307. Ithaca, NY: Cornell University Press. ISBN 0-8014-0770-2.
- Graves, Edgar B., ed. (1975). A Bibliography of English History to 1485. Oxford, UK: Oxford University Press. ISBN 0-19-822391-9.
- Keynes, Simon (2001). "Hemming". In Lapidge, Michael; Blair, John; Keynes, Simon; Scragg, Donald (eds.). The Blackwell Encyclopaedia of Anglo-Saxon England. Malden, MA: Blackwell Publishing. ISBN 978-0-631-22492-1.
- Ker, N. R. (1979). "Hemming's Cartulary: A Description of Two Worcester Cartularies in Cotton Tiberius A.xiii". In Hunt, R. W.; Pantin, W. A.; Southern, R. W. (eds.). Studies in Medieval History Presented to Frederick Maurice Powicke (Reprint of 1948 Oxford University Press ed.). Westport, CT: Greenwood Press. pp. 49–75. OCLC 4883091. also reprinted in A. G. Watson, ed. (1985). Books, Collectors and Libraries. London: Hambledon Press. pp. 31–59.
- Lawson, M. K. (October 1984). "The Collection of Danegeld and Heregeld in the Reigns of Aethelred II and Cnut". English Historical Review. 99 (393): 721–738. doi:10.1093/ehr/XCIX.CCCXCIII.721. JSTOR 569175. S2CID 159987466.
- Mason, J. F. A. (2004). "Hemming (fl. c.1095)". Oxford Dictionary of National Biography. Oxford University Press. (subscription, Wikipedia Library access or UK public library membership required)
- Smith, Ted Johnson (2002). "Introduction". Historia de Sancto Cuthberto: A History of Saint Cuthbert and a Record of his Patrimony. Anglo-Saxon Texts Volume 3. Cambridge, UK: D. S. Brewer. pp. 1–40. ISBN 0-85991-627-8.
- Southern, R. W. (1973). "Aspects of the European Tradition of Historical Writing: 4. The Sense of the Past". Transactions of the Royal Historical Society. Fifth Series. 23: 243–263. doi:10.2307/3678880. JSTOR 3678880. S2CID 147361366.
- Staff. "History of the Cotton Library". Help for Researchers. British Library.
- Staff. "Manuscript Description of Cotton Tiberius A.xiii". British Library Catalogue. British Library. Archived from the original on 16 October 2012.
- Stafford, Pauline (1989). Unification and Conquest: A Political and Social History of England in the Tenth and Eleventh Centuries. London: Edward Arnold. ISBN 0-7131-6532-4.
- Tinti, Francesca (November 2002). "From Episcopal Conception to Monastic Compilation: Hemming's Cartulary in Context". Early Medieval Europe. 11 (3): 233–261. doi:10.1046/j.0963-9462.2002.00110.x. S2CID 162533685.
- Tinti, Francesca (2022). "Constructing Narrative in the Closing Folios of Hemming's Cartulary". In Woodman, David (ed.). Constructing History across the Norman Conquest. Boydell & Brewer. pp. 92–120.
- Tite, Colin G. C. (1994). "The Development of the Manuscript Collection 1588–1753". In Tite, Colin G. C. (ed.). The Manuscript Library of Sir Robert Cotton. The Panizzi Lectures 1993. London: British Library. pp. 1–39. ISBN 0-7123-0359-6.
- Tite, Colin G. C. (2003). The Early Records of Sir Robert Cotton's Library: Formation, Cataloguing, Use. London: British Library. ISBN 0-7123-4824-7.
- van Houts, Elisabeth (2002). "Historical Writing". In Harper-Bill, Christopher; van Houts, Elizabeth (eds.). A Companion to the Anglo-Norman World. Woodbridge, UK: Boydell. pp. 103–121. ISBN 978-1-84383-341-3.
- Williams, Ann (2003). Aethelred the Unready: The Ill-Counselled King. London: Hambledon & London. ISBN 1-85285-382-4.
- Williams, Ann (2005). "The Cunning of the Dove: Wulfstan and the Politics of Accommodation". In Brooks, Nicholas; Barrow, Julia (eds.). St. Wulfstan and His World. Aldershot, UK: Ashgate. pp. 23–38. ISBN 0-7546-0802-6.
- Williams, Ann (2000). The English and the Norman Conquest. Woodbridge, UK: Boydell Press. ISBN 0-85115-708-4.
- Williams, Ann (1997). "The Spoliation of Worcester". Anglo-Norman Studies. 19: 383–408. ISBN 978-0-85115-707-8.
