= Cyneweard =

Cyneweard [varying Cynweard, Cyneward, Kinward, and so on] can refer to:

- Cyneweard of Glastonbury (died 975), bishop of Wells
- Cyneweard of Laughern (fl. 1066–1079x1086), sheriff of Worcester
