= Cyneweard of Laughern =

Anglo-Saxon thegn and sheriff

Cyneweard

Sheriff of Worcestershire
- In office before 1069 – 1069
- Preceded by: Leofric [last known], fl. 1017 x 1030
- Succeeded by: Urse d'Abetot

Personal details
- Born: eastern Mercia
- Died: between 1079 and 1086

Cyneweard of Laughern or simply Cyneweard (died 1079 x 1086) was a mid-11th century Anglo-Saxon thegn and sheriff in Worcestershire, England. Probably the son of Æthelric Kiu and grand-nephew of Wulfstan Lupus, Archbishop of York (1003–1023), he was one of the leading nobles of the county at the Norman Conquest of England. On the death of Edward the Confessor he held lands in Gloucestershire and Warwickshire as well as Worcestershire.

A vassal of the bishops of Worcester, he was sheriff in the county until 1069. He lost this after the arrival of Urse d'Abetot, and it was Urse and his brother Robert Despenser who deprived Cyneweard and his family of many of their holdings in the region. Cyneweard's other holding were taken by this family after his own death, which occurred sometime between 1079 and 1086.

== Domesday estates in 1066 ==
Cyneweard's name was uncommon in Anglo-Saxon England. It occurs only seven times in the Domesday Book, and it is probable that all references are to Cyneweard of Laughern. From the evidence in Domesday, Cyneweard held under the Bishop of Worcester half a hide at Laughern, Wichenford, five hides at Wyre Piddle, two hides at Elmley Castle, and along with his probable vassal Ulfkil, a manor of three hides at Hanley.

In Warwickshire Cyneweard possessed, along with a thegn named Beorhtric, six hides at Stretton-on-Fosse. In Gloucestershire, he held a manor of two hides at Duntisbourne Abbots, and in the same county in the village of Coates he held one of three manors; his manor was worth one hide, with another one-hide manor being held by Beorhtric, and a third manor worth half a hide being held by a thegn named Leofwine. It is likely that Cyneweard held in 1066 the five hide manor of Duntisbourne Abbots later given by the mother of Roger de Lacy to Gloucester Abbey.

== Background ==
Cyneweard was probably the son of Æthelric Kiu, a relative of Wulfstan (nicknamed "Lupus"), Archbishop of York (1003–1023) and Bishop of Worcester (1003–1016). Archbishop Wulfstan's sister Wulfgifu had married a Worcester thegn named Wulfric. It is known that Wulfgifu (presumably with Wulfric) had a son named Beorhtheah, who himself became Bishop of Worcester (1033–1038); it is likely that they had another son called Æthelric, as Hemming describes Æthelric and Beorhtheah as brothers.

Historian Ann Williams argued that, on the evidence land-holdings, Cyneweard was the son of this Æthelric. This argument has been accepted by other historians, such as the historian of the earldom of Mercia, Stephen Baxter. A thegn named Godric is known directly to have been the son of this Æthelric too, and thus Cyneweard's brother. They had a sister named Eadgyth, who became a nun and was still living in 1086.

Beorhtheah used his position as bishop to lease to his brother Æthelric, Cyneweard's probable father, manors at Alton, Himbleton, Lower Wolverton and Whittington. Æthelric complemented the family's landholdings by receiving more leased land from his brother's successor Lyfing, bishop of Worcester with a little interruption from 1038 or 1039 until 1046. This included Elmley Castle held by Cyneweard in 1066, as well as Armscote, Bentley-in-Holt and Hill Croome. These bishops leased out other lands to other members of this family, meaning that in 1066 Cyneweard was a leading member of a kin-group, closely related to the famous bishop, strongly entrenched and dominant in the region. Not associated (unlike some thegns in the region) with the family of the Earl of Mercia, Williams describes Cyneweard and his kindred as "in the mouvance of the bishops of Worcester just as much if not more than the king".

== Career ==
It is clear from a document dating to 1079 x 1089 that Cyneweard held, at an earlier date, the position of sheriff of Worcester. Records are poor, and it is unclear when he obtained this position, but he probably held it until the arrival of the Norman knight Urse d'Abetot in 1069. He had survived the Norman Conquest of England in 1066, and however he lost this position to Urse in 1069 (it is not known), he was still alive in 1072 when he witnessed a charter [as Kineward de Lauro] of Robert de Stafford. He was the last Anglo-Saxon sheriff of the county.

He probably survived for some time after that, as he was present at a plea between the church of Worcester and Evesham Abbey regarding the estates of Bengeworth and Hampton heard at an unknown date between 1079 and 1083. These manors were held by Evesham but Worcester claimed them as part of the triple hundred of the Oswaldslow. The suit was between Bishop Wulfstan (II) of Worcester and Walter, Abbot of Evesham, and Cyneweard's appearance was made, along with other Worcestershire notables, to substantiate Wulfstan's claim, a claim to which Abbot Walter yielded.

According to Hemming, after Cyneweard's death his manors of Laughern and Elmley Castle were seized by Urse d'Abetot's brother Robert Despenser. This must have occurred before 1086, when it was recorded in Domesday Book that they were in Robert's possession. Cyneweard's brother Godric had lost his land at Alton to William fitz Osbern sometime in or before 1071, the year of William's death, though despite this Godric was still alive in 1086.
