= De correctione rusticorum =

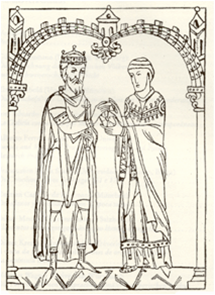
St. Martin of Braga, right (drawing from a 12th century manuscript)

De correctione rusticorum ('on the correction of rural people'), also known as Pro castigatione rusticorum ('for the castigation of rural people') is a letter by Saint Martin of Braga (c. 520–580 CE), written in Gallaecia. The text begins with a letter from Martin to Bishop Polemius of Astorga, indicating that Polemius had asked Martin to write a piece on the origin of idols. Compared with Caesarius of Arles, Martin seems to take a gentler stance on how to accommodate non-Christian traditions in the course of missionary work in the region.

== Sources and influence ==
The De correctione drew on De catechizandis rudibus by Augustine of Hippo

It was in turn a major influence on Pirmin of Reichenau's Scarapsus, and a source for several of Ælfric of Eynsham's sermons, not least his famous De falsis diis. The text may also have been referred to directly by the writer of the Old Norse Um þat hvaðan ótrú hófsk ('how false belief began'), whose text is, however, more strongly influenced by Ælfric's De falsis diis.

== Editions and translations ==
- An unprovenanced online text of the sermon
- Text in Latin with a facing English translation by Hélio Pires
- Martin von Bracara's Schrift De Correctione Rusticorum, ed. by C. P. Caspari (Christiana, 1883) (including German translation)
- C. W. Barlow, Iberian Fathers: Martin of Braga, Paschasius of Dumium, Leander of Seville, Fathers of the Church, 62 (Washington, 1969), pp. 71-85 (English translation)
- Martini episcopi Bracarensis opera omnia, ed. by C. W. Barlow (New Haven, CT: Yale University Press, 1950), pp. 183-203 (edition of the Latin)
- Clols, Jove, Martin de Braga: Sermon contra las supersticiones rurales (Barcelona, 1981) (includes Spanish translation)
- Serban, G. I., 'Martino da Dumio, antico scritore rumeno', Mitropolia banatului, 39 (1989), 47-60 (includes Romanian translation)
- Martino de Braga, Contro le superstizioni: catechesi al popolo. De correctione rusticorum, ed. by M. Naldini, Biblioteca patristica, 19 (Nardini, 1991) (includes Italian translation)
- Colonna, Enza, 'Il Sermo Rusticus de Martino di Braga', Invigilata lucernis, 13-14 (1991-92), 121-47 (includes Italian translation)
- López Pereira, J. E. and J. Correa Corredoira, De correctione rusticorum: Martiño de Braga; gravados Correa Corredoira; a traducción ao galego da presente obra estivo a cargo do profesor X. Eduardo López Pereira e foi realizada a partir dos manuscritos latinos orixinais (A Coruña: Espiral Maior, 1997)
