= Sermo Lupi ad Anglos =

Homily by Wulfstan II, Archbishop of York, delivered around 1014

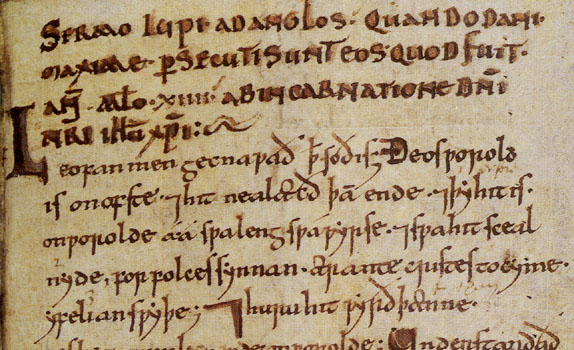
Opening of the sermon in British Library MS Cotton, Nero A.i, with Latin introduction: Sermo Lupi ad Anglos. quando Dani maxime persecuti sunt eos quod fuit anno millesimo XIIII ab incarnatione Domini nostri Jesus Christi.

The Sermo Lupi ad Anglos ('The Sermon of the Wolf to the English') is the title given to a homily composed in England between 1010 and 1016 by Wulfstan II, Archbishop of York (died 1023), who commonly styled himself Lupus, or 'wolf' after the first element in his name [wulf-stan = 'wolf-stone']. Though the title is Latin, the work itself is written in Old English. The Sermo Lupi is Wulfstan's most well-known work. In it, he blames a lack of moral discipline amongst his fellow English as the source of God's anger against the English, which has taken the shape of thirty years of Viking raids against England. Wulfstan exhorts the English to behave in a manner more pleasing to God, and specifically to live according to the laws of the Church and of the king. The Sermo Lupi is noted for its rhetorical achievements, and is considered to represent the height of Wulfstan's skill as a homilist and rhetor. The text of the Sermo Lupi has been critically edited many times, most recently by Dorothy Bethurum. The work contains one of several mentions of Old English wælcyrian, a term cognate to the Old Norse valkyrjur—valkyries.

== Historical context ==
Wulfstan's past is obscure, though it is possible that he began his ecclesiastical career as a Benedictine monk. We know that he became Bishop of London in 996, perhaps already aged nearly 50. In 1002 he was simultaneously promoted to Bishop of Worcester, and Archbishop of York. He held both sees in plurality until 1016, when he relinquished Worcester. He remained archbishop of York until his death. It was perhaps while he was Bishop of London that he first became well known as a writer of sermons, or homilies, perhaps specifically on the topic of Antichrist.

As Archbishop of York, Wulfstan's administrative duties were considerable. In addition to tending the spiritual and financial needs of the religious and secular communities of the North of England, he was deeply involved in the vital politics of the South. He was one of the most important members of king Æthelred II's advisory council, known as the Witan, and as such was active in all the most significant political decisions of the day. By 1008 he had secured the privilege of drafting the official royal legislation promulgated by the king and the Witan. He was deeply concerned with legislation, holding that good laws were essential if a people were to prosper. He continued as the king's chief legal draftsman on into the reign of the Danish king Cnut the Great. It is both remarkable and puzzling that Wulfstan was able to play so central a role in politics under both Æthelred's and Cnut's reigns, especially as it was under Æthelred's reign that Wulfstan, in his Sermo Lupi, so vehemently decried the depredations of the Danish and Norwegian Vikings.

King Æthelred II — nicknamed Æthelred 'The Unready' - ruled England from 978–1016. For virtually his entire reign, England was the object of successive Viking raids. Between the period of 980–1016, few areas of southern England remained unscathed as first Viking raiding parties, then entire Viking armies looted and ravaged the English countryside. Æthelred, roundly criticised by historians as ineffectual in the face of the Viking onslaught, was never able to mount a successful offense against the nimble Viking fleets, and his efforts to defend his kingdom against Viking armies were continually undermined. Æthelred and his advisors eventually adopted a policy of buying off the Viking armies with money. These enormous payments, known as Danegeld, had to be levied against English landowners and citizens, and this had a devastating impact on the English economy. Together, the Viking raids and the Danegeld payments brought the English people to their knees. But the Viking assaults continued. Few Englishmen during this time would have seen any reason to be optimistic about his own future or that of his countrymen. The situation became desperate in 1013, when, despite Æthelred, a prominent leader of the Viking armies, Swein Forkbeard, managed to position himself as king of England. In response, Æthelred retreated to Normandy where he remained until Swein's death the following year, upon which he immediately negotiated his safe return to England and his reinstatement as king. It is of these events that one of the versions of the Sermo Lupi makes mention. Wulfstan's role in these events are unclear, though sentiments he expresses elsewhere in his writings suggest that he would have supported Æthelred's cause over any Dane's. Dorothy Whitelock writes that "we have no evidence where Wulfstan was at the time of the submission [of England to Swein], but he was at York within a fortnight of [Swegn's] death, and we may suspect that he used his influence to win back the province to the English king Æthelred."

== Authorship and dating ==
Though Wulfstan's name is never directly attached to the Sermo Lupi, there is no question of Wulfstan's authorship. The text of the Sermo Lupi has survived in five manuscripts, a number of which associate the homily with Wulfstan's nom de plume, Lupus. The five manuscripts represent the text in three versions, one shorter and two longer. It is generally accepted that the shorter version is the original, and that one of the longer versions is a later authorial revision; that is, Wulfstan composed the homily, then later re-worked and expanded it. These versions thus provide an opportunity to study the practices of an Old English writer as he revises his own work.

The longer version, which Wulfstan probably revised himself, exists in a manuscript known to have been annotated and worked over by the archbishop; in fact, there are many corrections to the Sermo Lupi in this manuscript which were carried out by Wulfstan's own pen. The rubric, or title, for the Sermo Lupi in this manuscript reads: Sermo Lupi ad Anglos quando Dani maxime persecuti sunt eos, quod fuit anno millesimo XIIII ab incarnatione Domini nostri Iesu Cristi, 'The sermon of the Wolf to the English at the time when the Danes [Vikings] harried them, which was in the 1014th year from the birth of Jesus Christ.' Thus the date at which the revision was made was probably 1014. This was the year that Æthelred returned to England from Normandy and resumed his position as king of the English. It is also the year of a great royal council, at which Æthelred and his Witan published a new law code. There is good reason to associate these events with a special oral delivery of the Sermo Lupi by Wulfstan to the re-constituted English Witan. It seems significant that the Sermo Lupi specifically mentions Æthelred's exile, recalling it with regret.

== Rhetorical style and technique ==
Wulfstan not only abstractly discussed the correlation between the Viking invasions and the anger of God, but also explicitly stated the types of acts that God would find condemnable. In order to emphasize the severity of their situation, Wulfstan employed a variety of rhetorical techniques to elicit a sense of urgency (phrase repetition, metaphorical language, etc.). Rather than suggesting a unified stance against the Vikings, he implored his congregation/English population to abandon the behaviors of plundering, selling one another into slavery, betraying one's lord, buying women for sexual gratification, breaking religious and moral pledges, praising false gods, and a variety of other deplorable acts. Wulfstan, however, articulated that it was still possible to avoid the apocalypse/wrath of God, if they steered away from the devil and instead remain obedient and respectful to the Almighty.

Wulfstan attained a high degree of competence in rhetorical prose, working with a distinctive rhythmical system based around alliterative pairings. He used intensifying words, distinctive vocabulary and compounds, rhetorical figures, and repeated phrases as literary devices. These devices lend Wulfstan's homilies their tempo-driven, almost feverish quality, allowing them to build toward multiple climaxes. The genius of his style is based chiefly on sound and parallelsim. The passage below, taken from the Sermo Lupi, employs numerous rhetorical devices, including alliteration, parallelism, tautology, and rhyme:

Old English Forþam hit is on us eallum swutol & gesene þæt we ær þysan oftor bræcan þonne we bettan, & þy is þysse þeode fela onsæge. Ne dohte hit nu lange inne ne ute: ac wæs here & hunger, bryne & blodgyte, on gewelhwylcan ende oft & gelome. & us stalu & cwalu, stric & steorfa, orfcwealm & uncoþu, hol & hete & rypera reaflac derede swyþe þearle.	Modern English Therefore it is clear and well seen in all of us that we have previously more often transgressed than we have amended, and therefore much is greatly assailing this nation. Nothing has prospered now for a long time either at home or abroad, but there has been military devastation and hunger, burning and bloodshed in nearly every district time and again. And stealing and slaying, plague and pestilence, murrain and disease, malice and hate, and the robbery by robbers have injured us very terribly.

The Sermo Lupi, as with all of Wulfstan's literary works, is known for its frequent, almost habitual, use of intensifying phrases. Examples from the passage above include oft & gelome "often and frequently" and swyþe þearle "very terribly." Other intensifying phrases frequently used by Wulfstan, in the Sermo Lupi and in other of his works, are ealles to swyðe "altogether too much", georne "eagerly", mide rihte "in right manner", for Gode and for worulde "for God and for world", among others. Famously, Wulfstan often created long 'lists of sinners', wherein he joined a series terms (of compound words, and often used by no one else) into groups using alliteration. One of the most famous examples is found in the Sermo Lupi:

Old English Her syndan þurh synleawa, awa hit þincan mæg, sare gelewede to manege on earde. Her syndan mannslagan and mægslagan and mæsserbanan and mynsterhatan; and her syndan mansworan and morþorwyrhtan; and her syndan myltestran and bearnmyrðran and fule forlegene horingas manegel and her syndan wiccan and wælcyrian; and her syndan ryperas and reaferas and woroldstruderas; and, hrædest is to cweþenne, mana and misdæd ungerim ealra.	Modern English Here, so it might seem, too many in the land are sorely injured by the wounds of sin: here are man-slayers, and killers of kinsmen, and murderers of priests, and enemies of monasteries, and here are cruel perjurers and murderers, and here are whores and child-killers, and many foul fornicating adulterers, and here are witches and Valkyries, and here are robbers and plunderers, and mighty despoilers, and, to speak briefly, numberless kinds of crime and every misdeed.

A similar device is at work in his list of afflictions in the first passage given above (here & hunger, bryne & blodgyte ... stalu & cwalu, stric & steorfa, orfcwealm & uncoþu, hol & hete...). The Sermo Lupi is considered to excel particularly in the use of repetition as a rhetorical device . Other devices which have been noticed in Wulfstan's works are dubitatio and verborum exornatio. His works are almost completely without metaphor and simile, and Wulfstan as a rule shies away from narrative and descriptions of the particular. The Sermo Lupi is one of his only works where description (i.e. of the moral decline of the nation) plays a significant role.

Wulfstan's Sermo Lupi also employs the rhetorical device known as Ubi sunt (Latin, "where are... ?"), a common medieval literary refrain used "to designate a mood or theme in literature of lament for the mutability of things." Though the refrain never properly arises in the Sermo Lupi (in English nor in Latin), the theme is nevertheless vigorously active as Wulfstan presents the cherished goods and virtues of the past as lost in the present due to the moral decline of Men and the world through time.

== Primary themes ==
- The world nears its end, and worsens every day as the time of Antichrist approaches. The Devil has led the English nation astray. Evil and injustice fill the land and none seeks a remedy. We have suffered much, yet we have deserved much. Even in heathen lands offerings are made to gods, but here we have stripped the Church and her servants of honour and of wealth. Since King Edgar's death, the laws of England have greatly deteriorated. Sanctuaries are violated, widows are forced to marry unjustly, and many are made poor and taken advantage of and sold into slavery abroad. Children are enslaved for stealing, and the rights of citizens and slaves are taken away. God's own laws and teachings are hated. We are disgraced through God's anger, and it will become worse for us unless we seek His protection.
- Much afflicts the nation, and no one prospers. Violence, hunger, pestilence, hate, and theft are rampant. Heavy taxation afflicts everyone. Storms ruin crops. The ties of kinship are no longer meaningful. We have made our own desires into law, and have ignored true law. Everyone seeks to betray and insult his neighbour. A lord is betrayed by his own men. The worst crime is to betray one's lord to death or to drive him from the land. Both have occurred here recently: King Edward was murdered and burned, and King Æthelred was driven from his own kingdom. Innocent people have been slaughtered too often. Rich men frequently neglect to upkeep religious houses.
- It is terrible to know that men often jointly purchase a woman, ravage her like dogs, and then sell her again to their enemies. Fathers sell their sons for profit, and sons their mothers. Too many perjure themselves and break oaths. A slave will flee his master to become Viking, and gains more honour thereby than his previous master keeps. We disgracefully pay off our enemies, and the English are continually defeated. Pirates are made strong, and one of them can drive away ten of our own, so afflicted are we with sin. Our lot is misery and public shame for we honour those who injure us and pay who humiliate us.
- The nation is corrupted through vice. Crimes of every sort are perpetrated. Men are more ashamed now of good deeds than of evil ones. On account of pride no one repents of their sins, though books tell us to. We must seek remedy through repentance if we are to protect ourselves from God's anger, lest we suffer the fate of the Britons. The Britons were also afflicted with too many sins, and did not call out against evil when they saw it. Through their pride they angered God and he made foreigners (then the Anglo-Saxons) invade this island and take it from them.
- Thus let us turn to what is right and abandon wickedness. Let us follow God's laws and the king's, and atone for our wrongdoings. Let us behave as we promised we would at baptism. Let us keep oaths and be loyal to each other, and think about the Final Judgement and save ourselves from the torments of eternal fire; let us gain for ourselves instead the eternal rewards of Heaven.

== Historical relevance ==
In the sermon, Wulfstan addresses the entire English nation and holds it accountable for the country's plight. A key element of Wulfstan's sermon was the connection he made between the initial Anglo-Saxon rulers of England (who drove out the Britons from the country) and the Danes who were currently plaguing the country. According to Gildas, the Britons had been defeated because they had sinned against God. God had therefore allowed them to be vanquished. Wulfstan warns his listeners to learn from the past, and not share the fate of the Britons.

The Sermon of the Wolf is one of many homilies that attribute the Viking raids to the anger of God. In understanding this text as part of Old English homilies that equated and analyzed physical events and natural processes with transcendental forces, modern audiences can observe Christian theology firmly manifesting itself in the psychology of the English population (a theology that most would have been unaware of only a few centuries earlier.) Inadvertently, such types of evocative speeches/texts presented the English as their own worst enemy, ultimately culminating in a passive response toward Viking conquests as they were not the source of their plagues. This attitude thus allowed the Danes to proceed further inland and form their own settlements in various regions.

The sermon has been regarded as "an invaluable witness to the dismal state of affairs in Æthelred's reign", as it is one of the only contemporary documents which describes the effects of the Viking invasions in the beginning of the eleventh century.

== Editions and translations ==
- Bethurum, Dorothy, ed. (1957). The Homilies of Wulfstan. Oxford: Clarendon Press.
- Liuzza, R.M., ed. (2000). Beowulf: a New Verse Translation. Toronto: Broadview P Ltd. pp. 196–202 (Appendix D contains a complete translation of the Sermo Lupi Ad Anglos).
- Treharne, Elaine M. (2004). Old and Middle English c.890-c.1400: An Anthology. Blackwell. ISBN 1-4051-1313-8.
- Whitelock, Dorothy, ed. (1939). Sermo Lupi ad Anglos. London: Methuen & Co.
