= Pancartes =

Medieval monastic legal documents

Pancartes were medieval historical documents, drawn up by a monastery, that recorded a sequence of gifts to the monastery. They were created in order that the whole group of grants or gifts could be confirmed by the ruler. They are known from Normandy and other northern French regions. Sometimes they were created over a number of years as successive gifts were added to the original document. Generally the various grants were tied together with a narrative usually quite short, that linked the various gifts to a short history of the religious house. These documents were a frequent product of monastic houses in Normandy during the early 11th century and afterwards. Normally, they were not a product of the lay administration's chanceries, and came from ecclesiastical sources.

The historian David Bates said that the term pancartes has been overused in historical studies, that the strict definition of the term is "a charter which reproduces the text of more than one charter", and that the document duplicates the original of the copied charter.

Sometimes the pancarte was recopied after a number of additions had been made to the original, and this could occasionally lead to errors in chronology, as the additions to the original might have been made without respect to the actual order of the donations. The historian Marjorie Chibnall states that the medieval historian Orderic Vitalis used now lost pancartes of various Norman monastic houses as sources for his historical writings. The surviving pancartes are important for their recording of now-lost charters, and for understanding the history of historical writing.

The practice of writing pancartes influenced English monasteries, which were in contact with Norman houses after the Norman conquest of England in 1066. Post-Conquest cartularies, such as Hemming's Cartulary, bear many similarities to the Norman pancartes. Later, in the reign of King Henry II of England, the monastic writers Benedict of Peterborough, Roger of Howden, and Ralph Diceto also built on the pancarte when they inserted documents into their narratives, although their connecting stories were much more elaborate than many other pancartes.
