= Ælfstan (bishop of London) =

10th-century Bishop of London

- Bishop of London
- Appointed: between 959 and 964
- Term ended: between 995 and 996
- Predecessor: Dunstan
- Successor: Wulfstan

Orders
- Consecration: between 959 and 964

Personal details
- Died: between 995 and 996
- Denomination: Christian

Ælfstan (or Aelfstan /ˈælfstæn/) was a medieval Bishop of London.

Ælfstan was consecrated 959 and 964 and he died between 995 and 996.

== Citations ==
Christian titles
Preceded by Dunstan	Bishop of London c. 963–c. 995	Succeeded by Wulfstan
