= Leofsige =

11th-century Bishop of Worcester

- Bishop of Worcester
- Appointed: 1016
- Term ended: 19 August 1033
- Predecessor: Wulfstan
- Successor: Beorhtheah

Orders
- Consecration: 1016

Personal details
- Died: 19 August 1033
- Denomination: Christian

Leofsige (died 19 August 1033) was a medieval Bishop of Worcester. He was consecrated in 1016. He died on 19 August 1033.

== Citations ==
Christian titles
Preceded by Wulfstan II	Bishop of Worcester; 1016–1033	Succeeded by Beorhtheah
