= Hemming (monk) =

11th-century English monk and writer

Hemming (occasionally Heming) was a monk, author and compiler in medieval England from around the time of the Norman Conquest of England. He was a senior brother at Worcester Cathedral Priory, and his significance derives from the monastic cartulary (and works therein) attributed to him.

Hemming's name is Scandinavian, which may mean either he or his ancestors were Scandinavians settled in England. His birth and death dates are unknown, but he was actively writing soon after the Conquest. Hemming became a sub-prior in the Worcester cathedral priory. He is named in both the Liber Vitae of Worcester Cathedral as well as a list of members of the cathedral chapter that was compiled during the episcopate of Samson, the bishop from 1096 to 1112.

Hemming was the eponymous author and compiler of a work usually called Hemming's Cartulary. This is a collection of documents gathered together with a series of narratives about Worcester and its cathedral chapter. His compilation includes a life of Wulfstan, the Bishop of Worcester who died in 1095. This life was written in Latin. The historian Antonia Gransden describes this work as "more like an inventory of charters in narrative form than a biography".

Although Hemming has traditionally been credited with the entire work of the cartulary, it is actually two works that were collected together after Hemming completed his work. Hemming was the author of the second, later part, which was later bound together with an earlier cartulary to form the manuscript Cotton Tiberius A xiii, one of the manuscripts in the Cotton Library. In part of the work, the preface known as the "Enucleatios libelli", Hemming names himself as the person responsible for compiling the work, and names Wulfstan as the inspiration for his work. Historians usually take the preface to mean that Wulfstan commissioned the work. The cartulary is not just a collection of deeds and charters, but includes other historical information of importance, especially for his monastery. He compiled the various documents into a narrative whole.

One of the themes of Hemming's work is the deprivations suffered by his monastery at the hands of royal officials. Hemming singled out the conquests of England by Cnut and William the Conqueror as being especially damaging.

The historian Simon Keynes calls Hemming the "historian of his house". Hemming, according to the historian V. H. Galbraith, might be considered the first archivist in English history, as he arranged to have the documents at Worcester stored under locks, and spent time repairing and restoring some of the original documents in the cathedral.

Hemming was a contemporary of two other Worcester monks who wrote historical works. One was Coleman, who wrote a now lost Life of Wulfstan that was used as a source by William of Malmesbury. Another was John of Worcester, who reworked the Anglo-Saxon Chronicle into a Chronicon ex chronicis.

Although the correct form of the name is "Hemming", a transcription error in the 18th century caused many 18th- and 19th-century historians to use the one-m form of the name, until it was corrected in the Dictionary of National Biography article on Hemming in 1891.
