= De falsis diis =

Homily composed by Ælfric of Eynsham

De falsis diis, or, in Classical Latin spelling, De falsis deis ('on false gods'), is an Old English homily composed by Ælfric of Eynsham in the late tenth or early eleventh century. The sermon is noted for its attempt to explain beliefs in traditional Anglo-Saxon and Norse gods within a Christian framework through Euhemerisation. The homily was subsequently adapted and circulated by Wulfstan II, Archbishop of York, and also translated into Old Norse under the title ''Um þat hvaðan ótrú hófsk'' ('how false belief began').

The spelling De falsis diis tends to be used of Ælfric's text, and De falsis deis of Wulfstan's.

== Ælfric's version ==
Ælfric's sermon was based to a large degree on the sixth-century sermon De correctione rusticorum by Martin of Braga. At least seven Anglo-Saxon manuscripts contain parts of the sermon, the most complete being Cambridge, Corpus Christi College 178. The following summary is based on that of Arnold Taylor, and the line numbers refer to the edition by John C. Pope.

lines	topic
1–10	The opening address
10–27	The Nature of the Godhead and the Trinity
28–55	Adam and Eve in Paradise and its loss
56–58	The Fading of the Sun and Moon
59–71	Recovery of the Sun and Moon after Judgment Day
72–73	The Flood
74–77	The Tower of Babel
78–103	The worship of False Gods
104–140	Saturn and his Offspring
141–149	Disputing the 'pagan error' that Jove/Þórr was the son of Mercury/Oðinn
150–165	Venus and Incest
166–180	The Days of the Week
181–189	The Planets
190–209	The Making of Idols
210–216	Wars between the Philistines and Israelites
217–220	The Contents of the Ark
221–239	The Fall of Dagon
240–251	The Plague of Mice
252–281	The Travels of the Ark
282–291	God once more supports the Israelites
292–299	The Burning Fiery Furnace
300–313	Darius and Daniel
314–322	Darius' Grief
323–349	Daniel released from the Lions' Den
350–358	Daniel and Cyrus
359–369	Daniel and the Worship of Bel
370–386	Daniel's Altercation with the King
387–431	The Justification of Daniel
432–456	The Destruction of the Dragon
457–463	Daniel once more in the Lions' Den
464–483	Daniel is fed by Habakkuk
484–493	The King frees Daniel and praises God
494–499	Comments on the False Gods
500–675	Christ's coming in the sixth age of the world how the idol of Serpis was overthrown in Alexandria how Gregory the thaumaturgist proved the Christian God greater than Apollo

== Wulfstan's adaptation ==
Wulfstan II, Archbishop of York, adapted Ælfric's homily to how own style (as he did with a number of Ælfric's works). Wulfstan's version is also known as De falsis deis, as well as Homily XII. What made Wulfstan's approach unique was his calculated use of poetic devices and rhetorical style. A single manuscript copy survives in the Bodleian Library in Oxford, in the homiliary (collection of sermons) MS Hatton 113.

=== Influence ===
There is evidence indicating that Wulfstan's homilies, such as De falsis deis, were copied at Winchester, Canterbury, Exeter, West Midlands and an unidentified library somewhere in the southeast. This suggests that during Wulfstan's own lifetime, and shortly afterwards, his manuscripts were influential enough to merit the labor-intensive process of copying them by hand. There were several major churches/libraries copying his works, proving that Wulfstan's works were not just popular in one centralized location, rather they were spread to many major cultural centers of England. Another impressive fact is that many later homilists continued to copy segments of Wulfstan's homilies into their own works. This was still happening even two centuries after Wulfstan had written them, which "suggests either that particular kudos attached to echoing the wording of Archbishop Wulfstan or that subsequent compilers recognized the stylistic power of Wulfstan's work". The fact that Wulfstan's manuscripts were distributed so widely and were so frequently used in later works points to the significance of his message.

=== Themes ===
Though the church was always working towards the destruction of heathen practices, "change came about under varying conditions and with differing success" as people were not willing to quickly abandon the customs and traditions their people had had for generations. Evidence of this is the fact that Wolfstan's De falsis deis was based on Ælfric's De falsis diis, as was a later Icelandic homily called Um þat hvaðan ótrú hófst. Each of these homilies can, in turn, be traced back to Bishop Martin of Braga's De correctione rusticorum. This evidence, in addition to each author's perceived need to write a new homily, lead North to theorize "that the animism which Martin describes was widespread and long-lasting". "Animism" is the worship of natural elements, which is particularly evident in De falsis deis in lines 13 through 18 when Wulfstan tells of that people believed the sun, the moon, stars, fire, water and earth were all gods. He then takes this a step further and also equates these beliefs with the teachings of the devil.

Similarly, the teachings of the devil are also said to apply to other deities revered by non-Christians, such as in lines 28–29 when Wulfstan describes how people worshipped "world-men" who then became powerful as a result. Another technique involved here is that of euhemerization, when ordinary people attain a god-like status. This is an important point for Wulfstan to make in order to convince non-Christians of the error of their ways; their deities could simply be explained away as deceitful humans. In this way, according to North, "…Wulfstan shows non-Christian beliefs to be a disorderly heap of abuses bereft of any intelligible form or purpose" (207). As for the "teachings of the devil" repeatedly referenced by Wulfstan, David Johnson points out that "when it comes to such euhemeristic discussions of the pagan deities, the concept of demonisation is almost always involved as well".

Perhaps it is not so surprising that a homilist such as Wulfstan would try to demonize, or humanize, the deities of a culture they were trying to convert. After all, the Anglo-Saxons had only been converted a few hundred years beforehand, and "thousands of pagan Scandinavians had invaded and then stayed to settle in England". The evidence of England's pagan roots was painfully evident in many places, from folklore to place names and practices. According to very comprehensive lists compiled by Wilson, there are twelve major place-names involving Odin, eight with Thor and three with Tiw in England that still exist to this day (11–12). If these names have been retained to the present day, one can only imagine the prevalence of pagan gods' names used to name places in Wulfstan's time. Ælfric's "De falsis diis," upon which Wulfstan's homily was based, also goes into some detail about the origins of the days of the week. These, too, derive names from pagan origins, such as the Danish goddess Fricg being used for "Friday". Finally, Ælfric also specified in one of his works that "the singing of heathen songs at a funeral is forbidden," indicating the prevalence of Scandinavian pagan traditions into a Christian era. Though Ælfric and Wulfstan both make many references to Roman gods, both take care to connect them with their Scandinavian counterparts. However, both Wulfstan and Ælfric use an anglicized form of Old Norse Óðinn (Óðan and Oðon, respectively) rather than the Anglo-Saxon form Wóden. This could indicate two interesting points: one, that they were unwilling to associate their ancestors with heathens like the Danes, or two, that they were refraining from informing readers that Óðan/Oðon was the same figure from whom nobility and royalty of their time claimed lineage.

=== Style ===
Wulfstan's homilies were intended not to be read, but for public delivery. This necessitated many devices for clarity, "…notably a rephrasing of expressions which might be misunderstood, introduced by þæt is". One such rephrasing appears at lines 74–75 (An is ælmihtig God on þrym hadum, þæt is fæder and suna and halig gast) when he tries to explain the holy trinity, a concept that might confuse lay-people. Another notable feature of Wulfstan's work is the large number of intensifying words...such as æfre, swyðe ealles to swyðe, georne, mid rihte, ofer ealle oðre þing, swyðe georne, oft and gelome, wide, witode. While several of these examples are present within De falsis deis, one marker, swyðe, was particularly evident, showing up in lines 2 (twice), 37, 38, 41, 53, 66 and 73. Rhyme can also be found within De falsis deis at line 47 when it lists and saca and wraca. There are also an abundance of instances in which Wulfstan used alliteration, such as line 29 (woruldmen þe mihtige wurdan on woruldafelum") and line 42 ("se sunu wæs swaþeah swyðor). Alliteration and rhyme were prevalent in many works of Wulfstan's time, and Betherum points out that "alliterative and rhyming pairs of words…became so ingrained that when [Wulfstan] rewrote another person's composition…the substitution of two words for one is almost invariable" (232). Other elements indicative of Wulfstan's style include word or sentence parallelism, alliteration and rhyme. Sentence parallelism occurs in lines 9, 12, 14, 42, 56 and 64 with the expression þurh deofles lare. Repetition of such a phrase indicates its importance to listeners, who will then be more likely to remember these points. A great example of word parallelism can be found in line 25, mid muðe and mid modes. In short, Bethurum was quite accurate when she stated that Wulfstan "did not rely upon the inspiration of the moment; his effects are carefully planned" (233).

Certainly Wulfstan must have been a very talented writer, gaining a reputation of eloquence while he still lived in London. In a letter to him, "the writer asks to be excused from translating something Wulfstan had asked him to render into English and pleads as an excuse his lack of ability in comparison with the bishop's skill" (58). Similarly, "[o]ne early student of Wulfstan, Einenkel, and his latest editor, Jost, agree in thinking he wrote verse and not prose". This suggests Wulfstan's writing is not only eloquent, but poetic, and among many of his rhetorical devices, another is marked rhythm (229). Taking a look at Wulfstan's actual manuscripts, presented by Volume 17 of Early English Manuscripts in Facsimile, it becomes apparent that his writing was exceptionally neat and well-structured – even his notes in the margins are well-organized and tidy, and his handwriting itself is ornate but readable.

Wulfstan's style is highly admired by many sources, easily recognizable and exceptionally distinguished. "Much Wulfstan material is, more-over, attributed largely or even solely on the basis of his highly idiosyncratic prose style, in which strings of syntactically independent two-stress phrases are linked by complex patterns of alliteration and other kinds of sound play. Indeed, so idiosyncratic is Wulfstan's style that he is even ready to rewrite minutely works prepared for him by Ǣlfric". From this identifiable style, 26 sermons can be attributed to Wulfstan, 22 of which are written in Old English, the others in Latin. However, it's suspected that many anonymous materials are Wulfstan's as well, and his handwriting has been found in many manuscripts, supplementing or correcting material (495). He wrote more than just sermons, including law-codes and sections of prose.

== Wulfstan's version: text and translation ==
=== Old English ===
(The Old English text is reproduced here from The Cambridge Old English Reader by Richard Marsden, pages 205–208.)

1. Eala, gefyrn is þæt ðurh deofol fela þinga misfor and þæt mancynn to
2. swyðe Gode mishyrde and þæt hæðenscype ealles to wide swyðe gederede
3. and gyt dereð wide. Ne ræde we þeah ahwar on bocum þæt man arærde
4. ænig hæðengyld ahwar on worulde on eallum þam fyrste þe wæs aer Noes
5. flode. Ac syððan þæt gewearð þæt Nembroð and ða etnas worhton þone
6. wundorlican stypel æfter Noes flode, and him ða swa fela gereorda gelamp,
7. þæs þe bec secgað, swa ðæra wyrhtena wæs. Þa syððan toferdon hy wide
8. landes and mancyn þa sona swyðe weox. And ða æt nyhstan wurdon hi
9. bepæhte þurh ðone ealdan deofal þe Adam iu ær beswac, swa þæt hi worhton
10. wolice and gedwollice him hæþene godas and ðone soðan God and heora
11. agene scyppend forawon þe hy to mannum gescop and geworhte.
12. Hi namon eac him ða þæt to widome, þurh deofles lare, þæt hy
13. wurðedon him for godas þa sunnan and ðone monan for heora scinendan
14. beorhtnesse and him lac þa æt nyhstan þurh deofles lare offrondon and forleton
15. heora Drihten þe hy gescop and geworhte. Sume men eac sædan be ðam
16. scinendum steorrum þæt hi godas wæron and agunnan hy weorðian georne
17. and sume hy gelyfdon eac on fyr for his færlicum byrne, sume eac on wæter,
18. and sume hy gelyfdon on ða eorðan, forðan þe heo ealle þing fedað. Ac
19. hy mihton georne tocnawan, gif hi cuðan þæt gescead, þæt se is soð God
20. þe ealle þas ðing gescop us manum to brice and to note for his miclan
21. godnesse þe he mancynne geuðe. Ðas gesceafta eac ealle doð swa swa him
22. gedihte heora agen scyppend and ne magon nan þing don buton ures Drihtnes
23. þafunge, forðam þe nan oðer scyppend nis buton se ana soða God þe we
24. on gelyfað and we hine ænne ofer ealle oðre þing lufiad and wurðiaþ mid
25. gewissum geleafan, cweþende mid muðe and mid modes incundesse þæt
26. se an is soð God þe ealle ðing gescop and geworhte.
27. Gyt ða hæþenan noldon beon gehealdene on swa feawum godum swa
28. hy ær hæfdan ac fengon to wurðienne æt nyhstan mistlice entas and strece
29. woruldmen þe mihtige wurdan on woruldafelum and egesfulle wæron þa
30. hwyle þe hy leofedon, and heora agenum lustum fullice fulleodan. An
31. man wæs on geardagum eardiende on þam iglande þe Creta hatte se wæs
32. Saturnus gehaten, and se wæs swa wælhreow þæt he foryde his agene bearn,
33. ealle buton anum, and unfæderlice macode heora lif to lyre sona on geogoðe.
34. He læfde swaþeah uneaðe ænne to life, þeah ðe he fordyde þa broðra
35. elles, and se wæs Iouis gehaten and se wearð hetol feond. He aflymde his
36. agene fæder eft of ðam ylcan foresædan iglande þe Creta hatte and wolde hine
37. forfaran georne gif he mihte. And se Iouis wearð swa swyðe gal þæt he on
38. his agenre swyster gewifode; seo wæs genamod Iuno and heo wearð swyðe
39. healic gyden æfter hæðenscype geteald. Eora twa dohtra wæron Minerua
40. and Uenus. Þas manfullan men þe we ymbe specað wæron getealde for ða
41. mærostan godas þa on ðam dagum and þa hæðenan wurðodon hy swyðe þurh
42. deofles lare. Ac se sunu wæs swaþeah swyðor on hæðenscype gewurðod
43. þonne se fæder wære and he is geteald eac arwurðost ealra þæra goda þe þa
44. hæðenan on ðam dagum for godas hæfdon on heora gedwylde. And he hatte
45. Þor oðrum naman betwux sumum þeodum, ðone Denisca leoda lufiað
46. swyðost and on heora gedwylde weorðiaþ geornost. His sunu hatt Mars, se
47. macode æfre gewinn and wrohte, and sava and wraca he styrede gelome.
48. Ðysne yrming æfter his forðsiðe wurðodon þa hæðenan eac for healicne god
49. and swa oft swa hy fyrdedon oððe to gefeohte woldon, þonne offrodon hy
50. heora lac on ær to weorðunge þissum gedwolgode. And hy gelyfdon þæt he
51. miclum mihte heom fultumian on gefeohte, forðan þe he gefeoht and gewinn
52. lufude on life.
53. Sum man eac wæs gehaten Mercurius on life, se wæs swyðe facenfull
54. And, ðeah full snotorwyrde, swicol on dædum and on leasbregdum. Ðone
55. Macedon þa hæðenan be heora getæle eac heom to mæran gode and æt wega
56. gelætum him lac offrodon oft and gelome þurh deofles lare and to heagum
57. beorgum him brohton oft mistlice loflac. Ðes gedwolgod wæs arwuðe eac
58. betwux eallum hæðenum on þam dagum and he is Oðan gehaten oðrum naman
59. on Denisce wisan. Nu secgað sume þa Denisce men on heora gewylde þæt se
60. Iouis wære, þe he Þor hatað, Mercuries sunu, þe hi Oðan namiað, ac hi nabbað
61. na riht, forðan þe we rædað on bocum, ge on hæþenum ge on Cristenum, þæt
62. se hetula Iouis to soðan is Saturnes sunu. And sum wif hatte Uenus; seo wæs
63. Ioues dohtor and seo wæs swa ful and swa fracod on galnysse þæt hyre agen
64. broðor wid hy gehæmde, þæs þe man sæde, þurh deofles lare, and ða yfelan
65. wurðiað þa hæðenan eac for healice fæmnan.
66. Manege eac oðre hæþene godas wæron mistlice fundene and eac sywlce
67. hæþene gydena on swyðlicum wyrðmente geond middaneard, mancyne to
68. forwyrde, ac þas synd þa fyrmestan ðeh þurh hæðenscipe getealde, þeah ðe
69. hy fulice leofodon on worulde. And se syrwienda deofol þe a swycað embe
70. mancyn gebrohte þa hæðenan men on þam healicon gedwylde, þæt hi swa
71. fule him to godum gecuran þe heora fulan lust heom to lage sylfum gesettan
72. and on unclænnesse heora life al lyfedan þa hwile ðe hi wæron. Ac se bið
73. gesælig þe eal swylc oferhogað and ðone soðan Godd lufað and weorðað þe
74. ealle þing gescop and geworhte. An is ælmihtig God on þrym hadum, þæt is
75. fæder and suna and halig gast. Ealle þa ðry naman befehð an godcund miht
76. and is an ece God, aldende and wyrhta ealra gesceafta. Him syle sy lof
77. and weorðmynt in ealra worulda woruld a butan ende. Amen.

=== Literal translation ===
1. Alas, it is long ago, that through the devil many things went wrong, and that mankind too
2. greatly God disobeyed, and that heathenism everything too widely greatly harmed,
3. and still harms. Not read we however anywhere in books that man established
4. any heathen-pay [idolatry] anywhere in world in all the time that was before Noah's
5. flood. But later it happened that Nimrod and the giants built the
6. wonderful tower after Noah's flood, and to them then as many language occurred,
7. thus the book says, as of the makers [there] was. Then afterwards dispersed they wide
8. across the land and mankind then directly mightily waxed/increased. And then at last became they
9. deceived through the old devil that Adam long ago formerly betrayed, so that they made
10. perversely and heretically for themselves heathen gods and the true God and their
11. own creator scorned who them as men created and made.
12. They took also to themselves then that as wisdom, through devil's teaching, that they
13. worshipped them as gods the sun and the moon for their shiny
14. brightness and them sacrifices then thereupon through devil's teaching offered and abandoned
15. their Lord who them created and made. Some men also said about the
16. shiny stars that they gods were and began them to worship keenly
17. and some they believed also in fire for its sudden heat, some also in water,
18. and some they believed in the earth, because she all things nurtures. But
19. they could readily understand, if they knew that distinction, that he is true God
20. who all these things created (for) us men to enjoy and to use because of his great
21. goodness that he mankind granted. These created (things) also all do just as them
22. directed their own creator and not are able none thing do without our Lord's
23. consent, because no other creator not-is (exists) except the only true God that we
24. in believe and we him alone over all other thing love and worship with
25. sure faith, saying with mouth and with mind's conviction that
26. he alone is true God who all thing created and made.
27. Still the heathens not-wanted to be restricted to as few gods as
28. they before had but took to worshipping thereupon various giants and violent
29. world-men who mighty became in worldly-powers and awe-inspiring were as
30. long as they lived, and their own desires foully followed. One
31. man was in days-of-yore living on the island that Crete is called he was
32. Saturn named, and he was so barbarous that he killed his own children,
33. all except one, and un-fatherlike made their lives to destruction immediately in youth/destroyed them at birth.
34. He left nevertheless unwillingly one alive, although he did away with the brothers
35. otherwise, and he was Jove called and he became savage enemy. He expelled his
36. own father afterward from the same aforementioned island that Crete is called and wanted him
37. (to) destroy eagerly if he could. And this Jove became so greatly wanton that he
38. his own sister married; she was named Juno and she became (a) greatly
39. exalted goddess according to heathen reckoning. Her two daughters were Minerva
40. and Venus. These wicked men that we about speak were reckoned for the
41. greatest gods then in those days and the heathens worshipped them greatly through
42. devil's teaching. But the son (Jove) was nevertheless more greatly in heathenism worshipped
43. than the father (Saturn) was and he is considered also most honorable of all the gods who then
44. heathens in those days for gods had in their heresy. And he was called
45. Thor by another name among some nations, whom Danish people love
46. most and in their heresy worship most eagerly. His son is called Mars, he
47. made always strife and contention, and conflict and enmity he stirred up often.
48. This wretch after his death worshipped the heathens also as exalted god
49. and as often as they marched or to battle wanted [to go], then offered they
50. their sacrifice in advance as honoring (for) this false-god. And they believed that he
51. greatly could them assist in fighting, because he battle and war
52. loved when alive.
53. A certain man also was called Mercury in life; he was very crafty,
54. and, although fully clever in speech, treacherous in deed and in deceit. That one
55. made the heathens by their reckoning also for themselves into a renowned god, and at cross-roads
56. him sacrifice offered often and frequently through the Devil's teaching, and to high
57. hills him brought often various praise-offerings. This false god was honorable also
58. among all heathens in those days, and he is called Odin by another name
59. in (the) Danish manner. Now say some Danish men in their heresy that he
60. Jovis were, that they Thor call, Mercury's son, whom they call Odin, but they are (have)
61. not right, for we read in books, both in heathen and in Christian (ones), that
62. the evil Jove in truth is Saturn's son. And a certain woman was called Venus; she was
63. Jove's daughter and she was so foul and so wicked in lust that her own
64. brother with her copulated, so the men say, through the Devil's teaching, and that evil (woman)
65. venerated the heathens also as an exalted woman.
66. Many also other heathen gods were in various ways devised, and also similar
67. heathen goddesses in such honor throughout earth, mankind to
68. ruination, but these are the foremost nevertheless in heathenism reckoned, although
69. they foully existed in the world. And the scheming Devil who ever deceives in respect to
70. mankind brought the heathen men into the profound error, that they as
71. vile (people) them to gods chose who their foul desire themselves as law for themselves set
72. and in uncleanness their lives all lived the while that they were/existed. But he is
73. blessed who all such scorns and the true God loves and worships who
74. all things created and made. One is almighty God in three natures, that is
75. father and son and holy ghost. All the three names encompass one divine might
76. and (he) is one eternal God, ruler and maker (of) all creation. Him ever be praise
77. and honor in all world's world eternally without end. Amen.

=== Modern English translation ===
Alas, it is because of the devil that many things went wrong long ago, and mankind disobeyed God too greatly, and heathenism altogether did harm too greatly and still does widespread harm. However, we do not read anywhere in books that man established any idolatry anywhere in the world in the time before Noah's flood. Nevertheless, it happened later that Nimrod and the giants built a wonderful tower after Noah's flood, thus the book says that for them there were as many languages brought about as there were builders. Afterwards they dispersed far and wide across the land and at once mankind greatly increased. At least they became deceived by the old devil that betrayed Adam long ago, and they made perverse and heretical heathen gods for themselves and the true God, their own creator who made them as men, was scorned.

Then they also took it as wisdom, through the devil's teaching, to worship the sun and moon for gods because of their shiny brightness, and they made sacrifices to them that they did not know before, but learned through devil's teaching, and abandoned their lord who created and made them. Some men also said that the shiny stars were gods and began some believed gods were also in fire because of the sudden heat, some also believed there were gods in water, and some believed gods were in the earth, because she nourishes all things. They could readily understand, if they possessed the reason, that God is the true God who created all of these things for us men to enjoy and to use because of the great goodness that he granted mankind. These created things also do just as they are directed by their own creator, and they are not able to do a single thing without our Lord's consent, therefore there is no other creator besides the only true God that we believe in, and we love and worship Him with sure faith over all other things, praising him with our mouths and with our heart's conviction that he alone is the true God who created and made all things.

Yet heathens would not be restricted to as few gods as they had before, but took to worshipping various giants and violent men of the world who became mighty in worldly powers and were awe-inspiring while they lived, and they foully followed their own desires. One man was in former days living on the island that is called Crete, and he was named Saturn, and he was so savage that he did away with his own children, all except one, and unlike a father he destroyed their lives in their youth. He nevertheless reluctantly left one alive (though he did away with his brothers) who he was called Jove, and he became a savage fiend. He expelled his own father from the same aforementioned island called Crete, and he would have destroyed him eagerly if he could. This Jove became so wanton that he took his own sister as his wife; she was named Juno, and she became a greatly exalted goddess according to heathen reckoning. Her two daughters were Minerva and Venus. These wicked men that we speak of were told that these were the greatest gods then in those days, and they heathens worshipped them greatly through the devil's teaching. But Jove was worshipped more greatly in heathenism than Saturn was, and he is also considered to be the most honorable of all of the gods who the heathens, in their error, had for gods in those days. Also he was called by another name, Thor, between some nations, and the Danish people love him most and worship him eagerly in their heresy. His son is called Mars, he always made strife and contention and often stirred up conflict and enmity. After his death, the heathens worshipped this wretch for an exalted god and whenever they went to war or wanted to go to battle, they offered their sacrifice in advance to honor this false god. They believed that he could greatly assist them in battle, therefore they love him in battle and war when they are alive.

There was also a man called Mercury, he was very crafty and deceitful in deed and trickeries, though his speech was fully clever. The heathens made him a renowned god for themselves; at crossroads they offered sacrifices to him frequently, and they often, erringly, brought praise-offerings to tall hills, all through the devil's teaching. This false god was honored among the heathens in that day, and he is also called by the name Odin in the Danish manner. Now some of the Danish men say in their error that he, whom they call Thor, was Jove, the son of Mercury, whom they call Odin—but they are not right, for we read in books, both in heathen and in Christian ones, that the evil Jove is, in truth, Saturn's son. There was also a woman named Venus; she was Jove's daughter and she was so foul and wicked in lust that she copulated with her own brother, or so the men say, through the devil's teaching, and the heathens also worshipped that evil woman as an exalted woman.

Many other heathen gods were also devised in various ways, and likewise heathen goddesses were held in great honor through middle earth, bringing mankind to ruin; however, this was taught in heathenism because they foully existed in the world. The scheming devil who is ever treacherous to mankind brought the heathen men into profound heresy, so that they thought vile people were good and made their foul lusts as a law for themselves and they also lived their lives in uncleanness then because he existed. But they were blessed who scorned such and who loved and worshipped the true God that created and made all things. The almighty God is one in three persons, that is the father, the son and the holy ghost. All three of the names encompass the one divine might and he is the one eternal God, ruler and maker of all creation. He shall ever be praised and honored forever and ever in a world without end. Amen.

== Old Norse translation: Um þat hvaðan ótrú hófsk ==
This Old Norse text is based largely on the sections of De falsis diis that concern the world before the arrival of Jesus. It survives now only in the Norwegian-Icelandic manuscript Hauksbók, in a section written during 1302–10, but may be much older.

== Editions ==
- John Frankis, From Old English to Old Norse: A Study of Old English Texts Translated into Old Norse with an Edition of the English and Norse versions of Ælfric's 'De Falsis Diis', Medium Ævum Monographs, 33 (Oxford: Society for the Study of Medieval Languages and Literature, 2016) ISBN 978-0-907570-56-1
- Diane Elizabeth Szurszewski, Ælfric's de falsis diis: A Source-analogue Study with Editions and Translations (Chapel Hill: University of North Carolina at Chapel Hill, 1997)
