= Beorhtheah =

11th-century Bishop of Worcester

- Bishop of Worcester
- Appointed: 1033
- Term ended: 20 December 1038
- Predecessor: Leofsige
- Successor: Lyfing

Orders
- Consecration: 1033

Personal details
- Died: 20 December 1038
- Denomination: Christian

Beorhtheah also (Brihtheah) (died 20 December 1038) was a medieval Bishop of Worcester.

Beorhtheah's family was a wealthy family from Worcester. He had previously been Abbot of Pershore, and was consecrated in 1033. He died on 20 December 1038.

== See also ==
- Cyneweard of Laughern, his nephew

== Citations ==
Christian titles
| Preceded by Leofsige | Bishop of Worcester; 1033–1038 | Succeeded by Lyfing |
