= Grade II* listed buildings in Wyre Forest (district) =

Worcestershire shown within England

There are over 20,000 Grade II* listed buildings in England. This page is a list of these buildings in the Wyre Forest district in Worcestershire.

== Wyre Forest ==
Name	Location	Type	Completed (Note: The date given is the date used by Historic England as significant for the initial building or that of an important part in the structure's description.)	Date designated	Grid ref. (Note: Sometimes known as OSGB36, the grid reference is based on the British national grid reference system used by the Ordnance Survey.) Geo-coordinates	Entry number (Note: The "List Entry Number" is a unique number assigned to each listed building and scheduled monument by Historic England.)	Image
Bailiff's House	Bewdley, Wyre Forest	House	Mid 19th century	22 April 1950	SO7859175253; 52°22′30″N 2°18′57″W	1348653	Bailiff's House More images
Beales Corner	Wribbenhall, Bewdley, Wyre Forest	House	Mid 19th century	22 April 1950	SO7883775418; 52°22′35″N 2°18′44″W	1099956	Beales Corner More images
Church of St Anne	Bewdley, Wyre Forest	Parish Church	1695-6	22 April 1950	SO7857875310; 52°22′31″N 2°18′58″W	1099966	Church of St Anne More images
Number 62 (the Manor House) and Attached Railings	Bewdley, Wyre Forest	Apartment	Early 18th century	22 April 1950	SO7865975181; 52°22′27″N 2°18′54″W	1348654	Upload Photo
The Church of the Holy Family	Bewdley, Wyre Forest	Presbyterian Chapel	c. 1778	22 April 1950	SO7861175180; 52°22′27″N 2°18′56″W	1099983	Upload Photo
The Town Hall	Bewdley, Wyre Forest	Town Hall	1808	22 April 1950	SO7864275330; 52°22′32″N 2°18′55″W	1100788	The Town Hall More images
Tickenhill	Bewdley, Wyre Forest	House	15th century	22 April 1950	SO7847275094; 52°22′24″N 2°19′04″W	1348265	Upload Photo
Winterdyne	Bewdley, Wyre Forest	House	Mid 18th century	22 April 1950	SO7909174661; 52°22′11″N 2°18′31″W	1348266	Upload Photo
5, 7 and 9 Stourport Road	Wribbenhall, Bewdley, Wyre Forest	House	Early 18th century	24 March 1970	SO7890375356; 52°22′33″N 2°18′41″W	1167365	5, 7 and 9 Stourport Road More images
13 and 14 Load Street	Bewdley, Wyre Forest	House	Early 19th century	24 March 1970	SO7863375317; 52°22′32″N 2°18′55″W	1301049	13 and 14 Load Street More images
Drayton House	Drayton, Chaddesley Corbett, Wyre Forest	Country House	Early 18th century	25 February 1958	SO9072276202; 52°23′02″N 2°08′16″W	1167066	Drayton House More images
Hoarstone Farmhouse	Kidderminster Foreign, Wyre Forest	Farmhouse	Early 17th century	25 February 1958	SO7938676799; 52°23′20″N 2°18′16″W	1167685	Upload Photo
Victoria Bridge	Kidderminster Foreign, Wyre Forest	Railway Bridge	1859-1862	18 March 1987	SO7666579254; 52°24′39″N 2°20′40″W	1100657	Victoria Bridge More images
Church of St Giles	Heightington, Rock, Wyre Forest	Church	13th century	25 February 1958	SO7675871162; 52°20′17″N 2°20′33″W	1145814	Church of St Giles More images
Church House	Areley Kings, Stourport-on-Severn, Wyre Forest	Jettied House	Mid to late 16th century	5 July 1950	SO8021370961; 52°20′11″N 2°17′31″W	1217941	Church House More images
Church of St Bartholomew	Areley Kings, Stourport-on-Severn, Wyre Forest	Church	Norman	5 July 1950	SO8020071018; 52°20′13″N 2°17′31″W	1209472	Church of St Bartholomew More images
Lickhill Manor	Lickhill, Stourport-on-Severn, Wyre Forest	Country House	Late 17th century	5 July 1950	SO7968271818; 52°20′39″N 2°17′59″W	1209461	Lickhill Manor More images
Rectory	Areley Kings, Stourport-on-Severn, Wyre Forest	House	17th century	5 July 1950	SO8024471009; 52°20′12″N 2°17′29″W	1209473	Rectory More images
Tontine Buildings	Stourport-on-Severn, Wyre Forest	Lodging House	1772	9 November 1971	SO8105871030; 52°20′13″N 2°16′46″W	1292639	Tontine Buildings More images
Church of St Peter	Upper Arley, Upper Arley, Wyre Forest	Parish Church	12th century	25 February 1958	SO7638680473; 52°25′18″N 2°20′55″W	1100637	Church of St Peter More images
Church of St John the Baptist	Wolverley, Wolverley and Cookley, Wyre Forest	Parish Church	1772	25 February 1958	SO8288879317; 52°24′42″N 2°15′11″W	1348319	Church of St John the Baptist More images
Oak House, the Court House and the Old School House	Wolverley, Wolverley and Cookley, Wyre Forest	House	Late C20	25 February 1958	SO8290579462; 52°24′46″N 2°15′10″W	1172811	Oak House, the Court House and the Old School House More images
Wolverley House	Wolverley, Wolverley and Cookley, Wyre Forest	Apartment	Late C20	20 October 1952	SO8301779619; 52°24′51″N 2°15′04″W	1172767	Upload Photo
Caldwall Hall	Kidderminster, Wyre Forest	Castle	Late 15th century or early 16th century	20 October 1952	SO8308676227; 52°23′02″N 2°15′00″W	1179037	Caldwall Hall More images
Church of St George	Kidderminster, Wyre Forest	Church	1821-4	20 October 1952	SO8359476946; 52°23′25″N 2°14′33″W	1100088	Church of St George More images
Ribbesford House	Ribbesford, Wyre Forest	Mansion	19th century	20 October 1952	SO786738; 52°21′44″N 2°18′54″W	1329928	Ribbesford House More images
