= Shatterford Hill =

Hill in Worcestershire and Shropshire, England

Coordinates: 52.414°N 2.336°W

The view towards the Clee Hills from near the summit of Shatterford Hill

Shatterford Hill is an English geographical feature that extends from Bewdley in north Worcestershire to Birdsgreen near Alveley, just over the border in Shropshire. The hill is a long ridge running up the east side of the Severn Valley and peaks at 202 metres (663 ft) near the village of Shatterford on the A442 road between Kidderminster and Bridgnorth.

The ridge offers unhindered views across the Severn Valley out west to the Clee Hills, Caer Caradoc, the Long Mynd and on clear days to the hills of Wales. To the east is Kidderminster and the Clent Hills, and the urban West Midlands areas of Dudley beyond. To the north the Wrekin dominates the horizon near Telford, whilst to the south are the Malvern Hills. Although the triangulation pillar that officially marks the summit of the hill is in a field with no public access, next to a small mast, a viewpoint is provided on the Shatterford-Trimpley road with a small layby opposite.

Villages along the hill include (south to north), Trimpley, Shatterford and Romsley. The road following the crown of the ridge was probably the Micclan strete (great made-road), mentioned in the Anglo-Saxon bounds of Wolverley. This may have been part of an ancient road from Gloucester and Worcester to Chester. From Shatterford through Romsley and Quatt, thus became part of the Kidderminster to Bridgnorth turnpike, until an easier road (now A442) was built in the 1830s.

The ridge comes to a fairly abrupt end to the south, capped by Wassell Wood, where earthworks can still be seen from fortified enclosure of unknown date. The name "Wassell" is derived from the Anglo-Saxon "Weardsetl" meaning a watchplace. This was the westernmost of a chain of such watchplaces, also including Wassell Grove (near Wychbury Hill), Waseley Hills and Wast Hills in Alvechurch.

Below Wassell Wood to the east is Habberley Valley, a local nature reserve of lowland heathland, which is a popular picnic site locally.
