= A442 =

A442 may refer to:

- A442 road (England)
- Renault Alpine A442, a type of car
- A442 (pitch standard)
