= List of Staffordshire boundary changes =

Boundary changes affecting the English county of Staffordshire:

- 1844: The Counties (Detached Parts) Act 1844 (7 & 8 Vict. c. 61) transferred two parishes from, and part of a township to, the county.
- 1888: Those parts of the town of Tamworth lying in Warwickshire, and those parts of Burton upon Trent lying in Derbyshire were ceded to Staffordshire by section 50 of the Local Government Act 1888 (51 & 52 Vict. c. 41). Lichfield ceased to be a county in its own right.
- 1891: Harborne became part of the county borough of Birmingham and thus transferred from Staffordshire to Warwickshire by the City of Birmingham Order 1891 confirmed by the Local Government Board's Provisional Order Confirmation (No. 13) Act 1891 (54 & 55 Vict. c. clxi).
- 1895: a small section containing the villages of Shatterford and Upper Arley was transferred to Worcestershire, by the County of Worcester (Dowles and Upper Arley) Order 1895 confirmed by the Local Government Board's Provisional Orders Confirmation (No. 5) Act 1895 (58 & 59 Vict. c. lxxxvi).
- 1911: Handsworth became part of Birmingham, then in Warwickshire, by the Local Government Board's Provisional Order (1910) Confirmation (No. 13) Act 1911 (1 & 2 Geo. 5. c. xxxvi).
- 1928: Perry Barr was ceded to Warwickshire, also as part of Birmingham, by the Birmingham Extension Act 1928.
- 1966: Smethwick and Rowley Regis became part of Worcestershire, as components of the newly formed borough of Warley. Dudley was ceded from Worcestershire, having absorbed the Staffordshire towns of Sedgley, Coseley and Brierley Hill into its local authority.
- 1974: Under the Local Government Act 1972 (c. 70), Dudley, Wolverhampton, Walsall and West Bromwich (plus Warley and Birmingham) became part of the newly formed West Midlands County.
- 1994: The western/southern shores of Chasewater, were acquired from the West Midlands, transferring from the Walsall local authority into Lichfield District Council.
