= Bewdley Guildhall =

Municipal building in Bewdley, Worcestershire, England

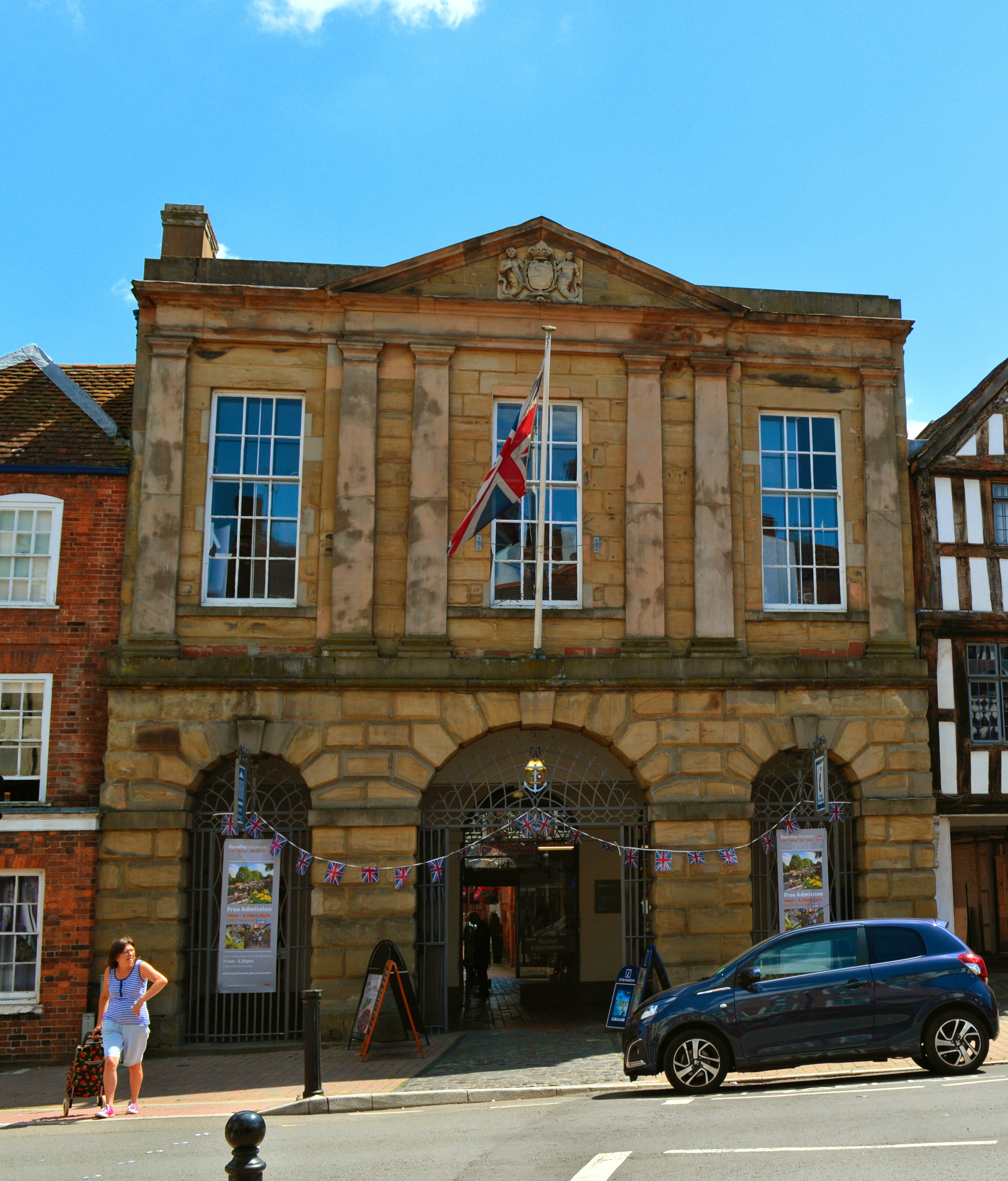
- Bewdley Guildhall

- Shown in Worcestershire
- 52.3756°N 2.3152°W
- Location: Load Street, Bewdley

History
- Built: 1808

Site notes
- Architect: John Simpson
- Architectural style: Neoclassical style

Listed Building – Grade II*
- Official name: The Town Hall
- Designated: 22 April 1950
- Reference no.: 1100788

Bewdley Guildhall is a municipal building in Load Street in Bewdley, Worcestershire, England. The structure, which is the meeting place of Bewdley Town Council, is a Grade II* listed building.

== History ==
The first municipal building in the town was an ancient guildhall located to the "southwest of the chapel" i.e. to the southwest of St Anne's Church. (Note: St Anne's Church was completed in 1748 but there are records showing there was a chapel on the site as early as 1450.) It was in the old guildhall that rioters broke into the building to prevent the appointment of the bailiff in 1708. By the early 19th century, the ancient guildhall was in a dilapidated state and the borough council ordered its demolition.

The borough council went on to commission a new guildhall: the site they chose had been occupied by the house of a local grocer, Thomas Wootton, who also owned a series of storerooms behind his house. These storerooms were demolished to make way for a butchers' shambles in 1802, shortly before the house was demolished to make way for the new guildhall. The new guildhall was designed by John Simpson of Shrewsbury in the neoclassical style, built in ashlar stone and was completed in 1808. The design involved a symmetrical main frontage with three bays facing onto Load Street. The ground floor was rusticated and featured three segmental openings, the central opening being wider than the others; all three featured wrought iron gates, voussoirs and keystones. The first floor was fenestrated with sash windows; on either side of the central window there were pairs of Doric order pilasters and at the corners there were single pilasters, all supporting an entablature, a cornice and a central pediment with a coat of arms in the tympanum. Internally, the principal room was the courtroom on the first floor.

The building was refurbished to a design by Henry Rowe of Worcester in 1866. In the 20th century, offices for council officers and their departments were established at Borough House, further to the northeast along Load Street. The butchers' shambles, just behind the guildhall, was converted for heritage use and was officially opened by Earl Baldwin as the Bewdley Museum in July 1972. Princess Alexandra also visited the guildhall that month and unveiled a plaque to commemorate the 500th anniversary of the granting of a charter to the town by King Edward IV.

The building continued to serve as the headquarters of Bewdley Borough Council for much of the 20th century but ceased to be the local seat of government when the enlarged Wyre Forest District Council was formed with its offices in Kidderminster in 1974. Instead it became the meeting place of Bewdley Town Council. A statue by the sculptor, Martin Jennings, of the locally-born former Prime Minister, Stanley Baldwin, was unveiled outside the guildhall by the Duke of Gloucester in September 2018. In February 2021, Wyre Forest District Council announced its intention to seek trustees to take over the management of the guildhall, among other local assets, as part of its localisation agenda.

== See also ==
- Grade II* listed buildings in Wyre Forest (district)
