= Trimpley =

Hamlet in England

Coordinates: 52.403°N 2.306°W

Trimpley (grid reference SO793784) is a village in the parish of Kidderminster Foreign. It lies on the ridge of Shatterford Hill, north of Wribbenhall and east of Habberley. The village (such as it is) lies along Trimpley Green, a small common. At the northern end of Trimpley is the ancient wooded area of Eymore Wood, now bounded on its west by the Severn Valley Railway, beyond which lies Trimpley Reservoir.

South of Trimpley Green lies Wassell Wood (now owned by the Woodland Trust). This wooded hill is surmounted by an earthwork enclosure of unknown date. The name "Wassell" is derived from the Anglo-Saxon "Weardsetl" meaning a watchplace. This was the westernmost of a chain of such watchplaces, also including Wassell Grove (near Wychbury Hill), Waseley Hills and Wast Hills in Alvechurch.

Hoarstone Lane and Trimpley Lane, through the village are probably part of the Micclan strete (great made-road), mentioned in the Anglo-Saxon bounds of Wolverley. This may have been part of an ancient road from Gloucester and Worcester to Chester.

In 1357 John Atte Wode, an usher of the king's chamber, obtained a licence to maintain a priest at Trimpley. The medieval chapel, founded by endowment as a chantry chapel, was dissolved at the Reformation. The present Trimpley Church was built in 1844 in a Norman-style as a chapel of ease.

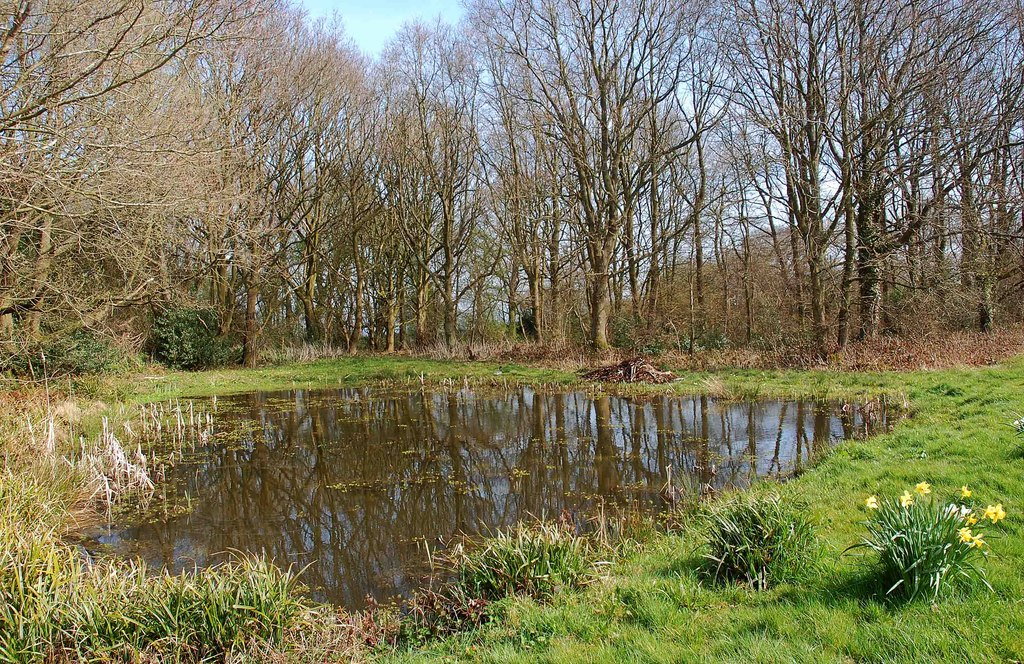
The village pond

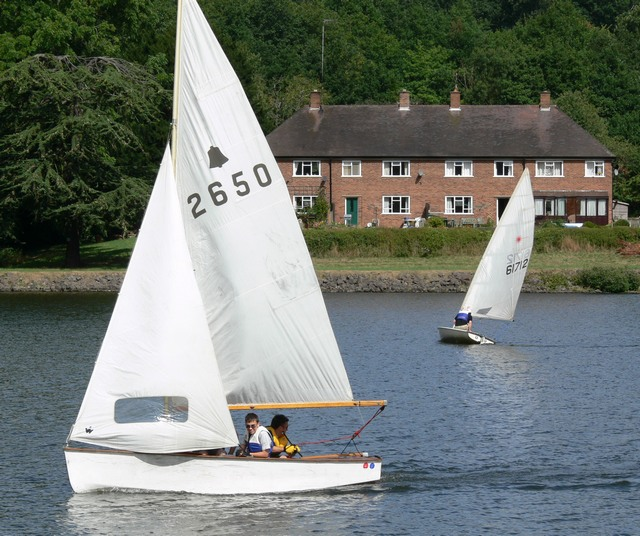
Trimpley Reservoir

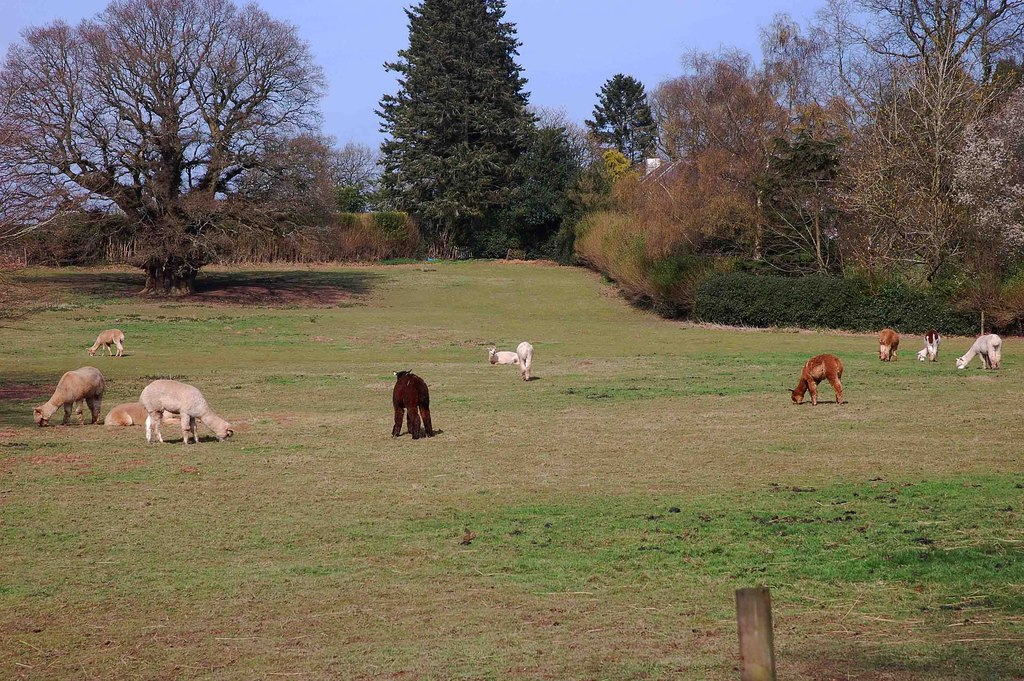
Alpacas at Trimpley

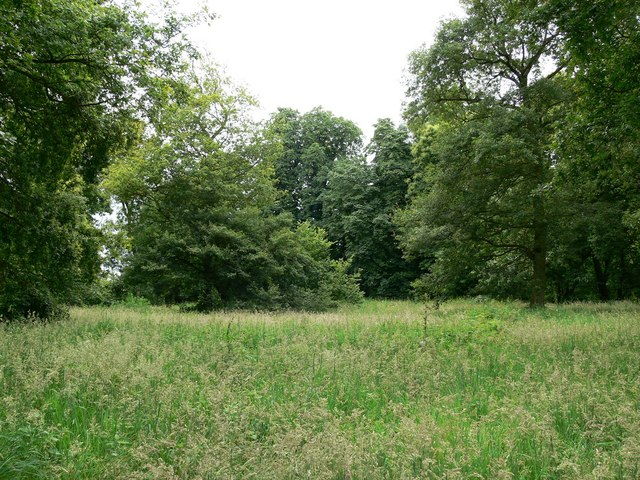
Inside the Earthworks in Wassell Wood

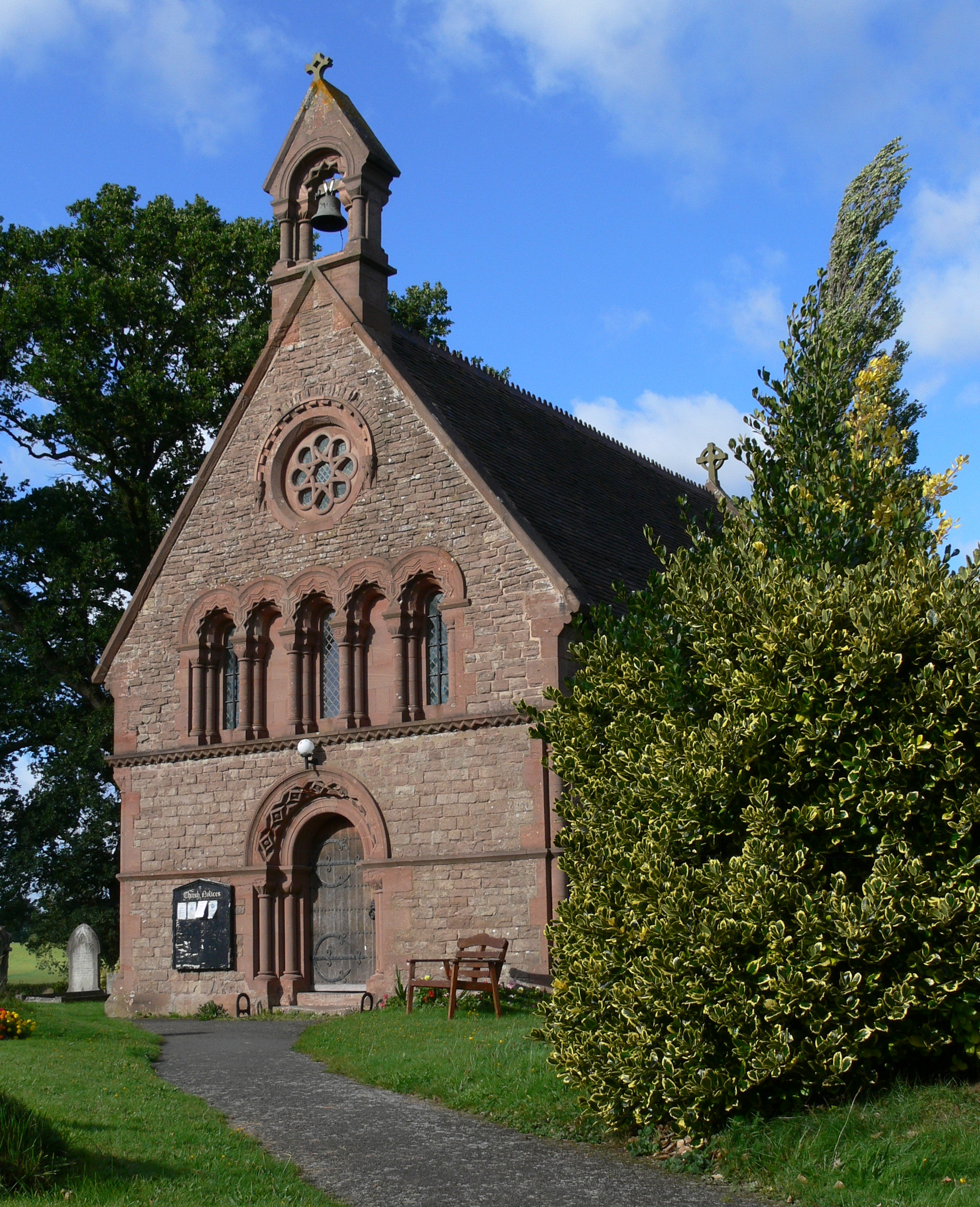
Holy Trinity Church
