= Romsley =

Romsley may refer to the following places in England:

- Romsley, Shropshire
- Romsley, Worcestershire
