= National Flood Forum =

The National Flood Forum is a British charity in Bewdley, Worcestershire dedicated to assisting individuals who have been affected by flooding and to guiding legislation related to flooding. The charity's efforts include, among others, cohosting events to provide information and services to victims of flooding and conducting studies into the personal impact of flooding. It also gives out "the Golden Sandbag Award" to individuals who have provided exceptional service to victims of flooding.

== History ==
Its first meeting was held in York in 2002. In 2005, the independent organization set up formal links with the Environment Agency to help address flooding issues in Cumbria. The Environment Agency provided funding to the forum totaling £250,000 before cutting funding in December 2007.

In late 2008, A new project was launched based on the style of the National Flood Forum, to cover Scotland. This community based project was funded by the Scottish Government and developed by the Environment Minister Mike Russell and its Founder Paul Hendy - a Community Flood Recovery Specialist with a wealth of experience in this work.
