= Primrose Archer =

English fashion model

- Born: Primrose Mary O. Archer; 2000 (age 25–26); Worcestershire, England
- Occupation: Fashion model
- Modelling information
- Height: 1.75 m (5 ft 9 in)
- Hair colour: Brown
- Eye colour: Blue
- Agency: The Lions (New York City); Fabbrica Milano Management (Milan); Select Model Management (Paris, London) (mother agency)

Primrose Mary O. Archer is an English fashion model.

== Early life ==
Archer was born in Worcestershire, England—the eighth of ten children—and raised on a farm. She and her siblings appeared in British Vogue in a 2005 editorial photographed by Tim Walker when she was a child. She was educated at The Bewdley School.

== Career ==
Archer was discovered at Birmingham's Clothes Show Live. In December 2018, she appeared on the cover of British Vogue, hand-chosen by editor-in-chief Edward Enninful, for one of the month's four covers; models like Stella Tennant and Adut Akech appeared on other covers. The cover was photographed by Steven Meisel.

Archer has modelled for Anna Sui and Marc Jacobs campaigns, while walking the runway for Michael Kors, Valentino, Max Mara, Matty Bovan, Burberry, Simone Rocha, Coach New York, and Missoni.
