= Heightington =

Village in Worcestershire, England

Coordinates: 52.33825°N 2.340775°W

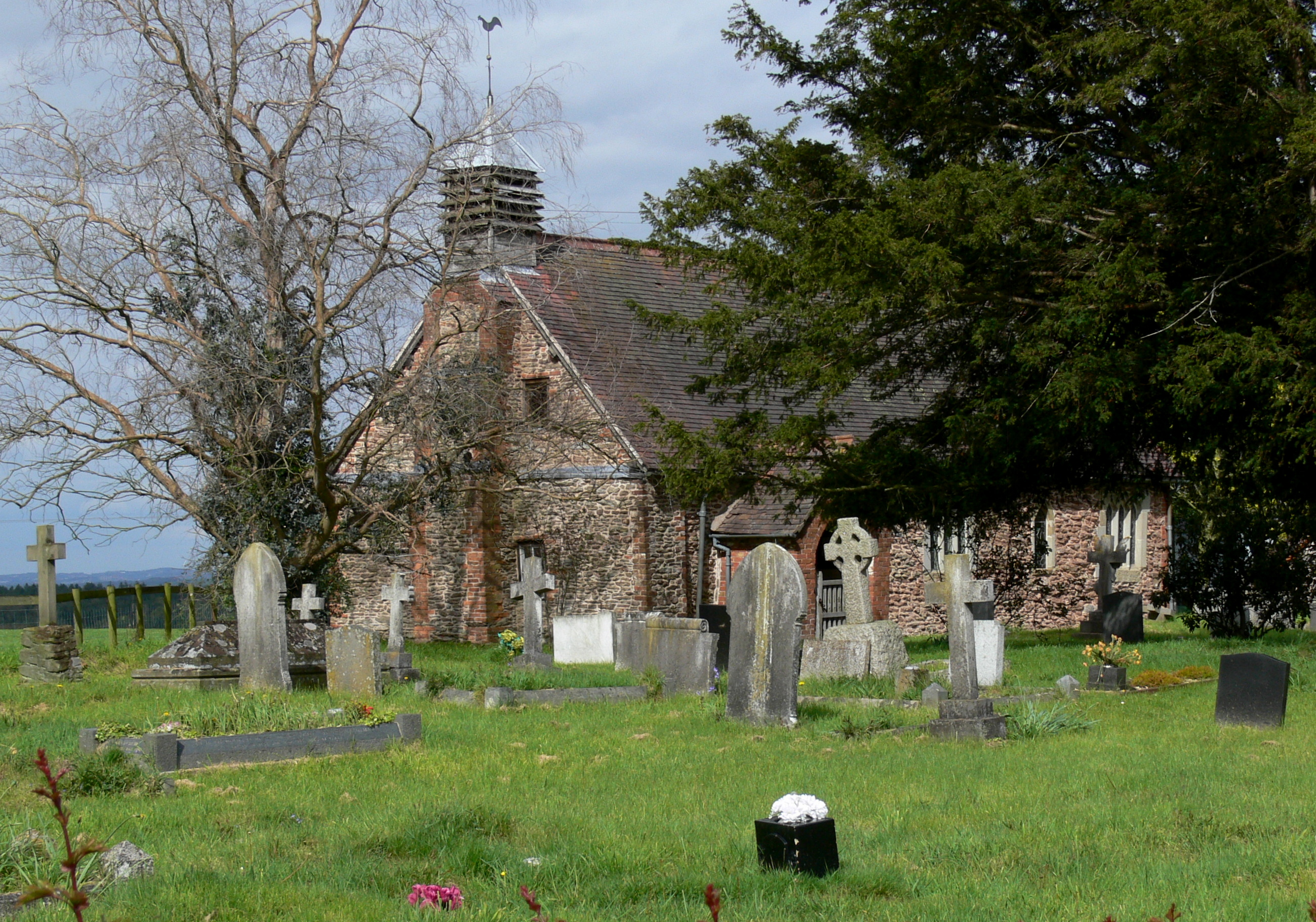
- St Giles Church

- Location within Worcestershire
- Civil parish: Rock
- District: Wyre Forest
- Shire county: Worcestershire
- Region: West Midlands
- Country: England
- Sovereign state: United Kingdom
- Police: West Mercia
- Fire: Hereford and Worcester
- Ambulance: West Midlands

Heightington is a small village in Worcestershire, England. It lies within the civil parish of Rock, which had a population of 2,677 in 2021.

It lies a little to the south-west of Bewdley and a little to the west of Stourport-on-Severn. Its best known landmark is the 13th century Grade II* listed St Giles' Church.
