= Evesham Town Hall =

Municipal building in Evesham, Worcestershire, England

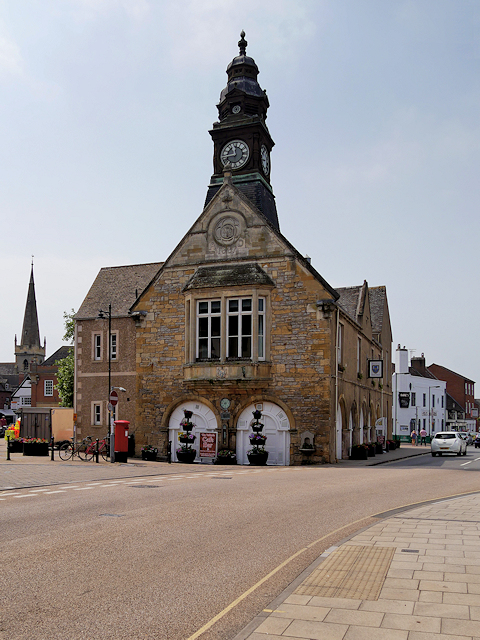
- Evesham Town Hall (from the north)

- Shown in Worcestershire
- 52.0924°N 1.9475°W
- Location: Market Place, Evesham

History
- Built: 1586

Site notes
- Architect: George Hunt
- Architectural style: Neoclassical style

Listed Building – Grade II
- Official name: Town Hall
- Designated: 7 May 1952
- Reference no.: 1350104

Evesham Town Hall is a municipal structure in the Market Place in Evesham, Worcestershire, England. The town hall, which was the headquarters of Evesham Borough Council, is a Grade II listed building.

== History ==
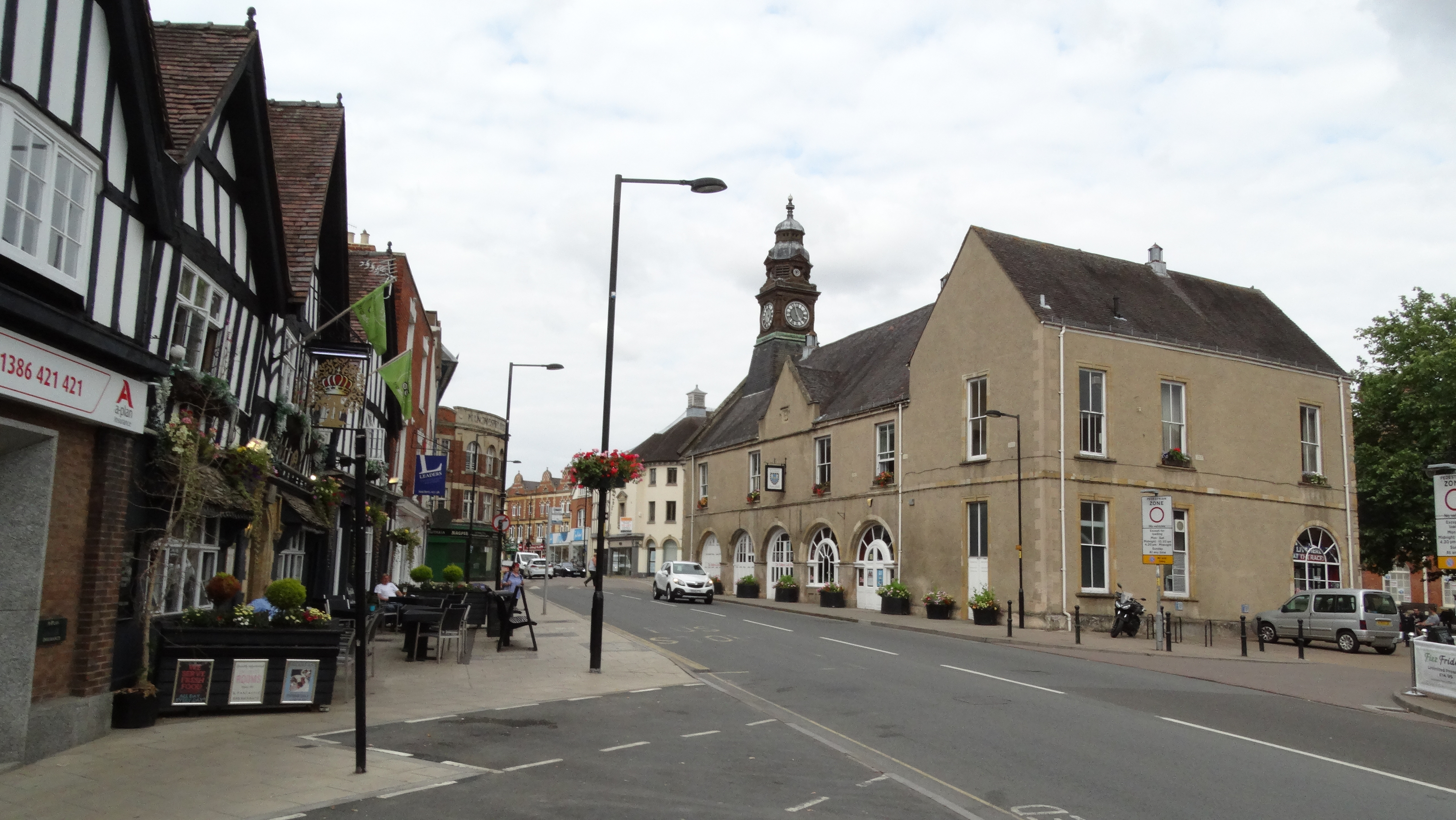
South-west view of the Town Hall.

The first municipal building in Evesham was a medieval guildhall in Bridge Street close to the bridge across the River Avon. After the old guildhall fell into a state of disrepair, civic leaders briefly used the black and white timber-framed Round House (also known as the Booth Hall) in Bridge Street for their meetings until the town hall became available. Following the Dissolution of the Monasteries in the 1540s, the remains of Evesham Abbey, and much of the town to the north of the abbey, was acquired by the then Master of the Ordnance in the North, Sir Philip Hoby, in 1546. After Sir Philip Hoby's death in 1558, the abbey site passed to his nephew, Sir Edward Hoby, who decided to commission the town hall as a gift to the town.

The new building was designed in the neoclassical style, was built from rubble masonry recovered the ruins of the abbey and was completed in 1586. It was designed with arcading on the ground floor to allow markets to be held and with an assembly room on the first floor, which at one time was used for the Quarter Sessions and Assizes, as well as for council meetings and public gatherings. The building was extended, with the addition of a council chamber on the first floor, in 1728, at the expense of two local members of parliament: John Rudge and Sir John Rushout.

A village lock-up for holding petty criminals and facilities for grain threshing were installed in the arcaded area at an early stage; it was later used as a butter and poultry market. The central part of the arcade, underneath the Council Chamber, served as the borough gaol until 1835, after which it housed a police station. Another part of the arcade was used to house the borough's fire engines in he early 19th century, but they were later removed in order to provide accommodation for the gaoler.

In 1834 the building was renovated and a new wing was added. The following year the town was advanced to the status of municipal borough with the town hall as its headquarters.

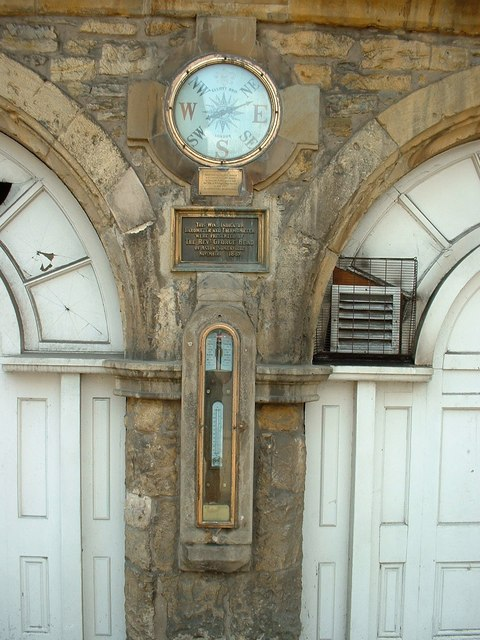
Weather instruments on the north elevation of the town hall, dating from 1887.

The north gable housed a clock, and there was a small bell-turret on the roof above; but this part of the building was substantially remodelled, to a design by George Hunt, when a new clock tower was erected on the roof to commemorate the Golden Jubilee of Queen Victoria in 1887. He rebuilt the two-bay frontage facing north towards the High Street: the ground floor consisted of two stone arches while the first floor featured a large oriel window; above the window, his reconstructed gable contained a trefoil surrounded by the inscriptions "V.R." (Victoria Regina) and "A.D. 1887" and displaying a coat of arms at its centre. The new clock tower was made of oak and contained a bell (weighing 4cwt) for striking the hours. As part of the rebuilding, a wind indicator, a barometer and a thermometer were presented the Reverend George Head, the priest in charge of St Mary's Church at Aston Somerville, and installed on the north face of the building in November 1887. The clock was inaugurated the following month, on 15 December.

The town hall continued to serve as the headquarters of the borough for much of the 20th century but ceased to be the local seat of government after the enlarged Wychavon District Council was formed in 1974. In April 1995, the building was acquired by Evesham Town Council which arranged the restoration of the clock tower in 1998, the refurbishment of the weather instruments in 2000, and tenancies for the ground floor so that the area could be used as a café bar. As of 2024, however, the building was reportedly in a 'state of disrepair' with leaking roofs, mouldy carpets, peeling paintwork and rotten woodwork.

Internally, the principal rooms (on the first floor) are the main hall and the council chamber. Works of art in the town hall include a series of paintings by the artist, George Willis-Pryce, depicting the Workman Bridge across the River Avon, the ferry to the village of Little Hampton, and the old gateway to the Market Square. There are also portraits of former mayors, including Herbert New and Henry Workman, and (in the Council Chamber) Sir Charles Cockerell.
