= Listed buildings in Romsley, Shropshire =

Romsley is a civil parish in Shropshire, England. It contains three listed buildings that are recorded in the National Heritage List for England. All the listed buildings are designated at Grade II, the lowest of the three grades, which is applied to "buildings of national importance and special interest". The parish is almost completely rural with a few small scattered settlements, and the listed buildings are all houses dating from the 16th and 17th centuries.

== Buildings ==
Name and location	Photograph	Date	Notes
Tudor Farm House; 52.44226°N 2.31071°W	—	16th century	The farmhouse has been considerably extended. The original part is timber framed, the later parts are in stone and brick, and the roof is tiled. It has two storeys, a moulded string course, and stone mullioned windows.
The Manor House, Bowhills Farm; 52.45721°N 2.32657°W	—	1602	The farmhouse was later altered and extended. It is in red brick and some stone, with a string course and a tile roof with crow-stepped gables. There are two storeys and an attic, and a T-shaped plan, consisting of a main range, a cross-wing on the right, a porch in the angle on the front, and a stair tower in the angle at the rear. Most of the windows are mullioned, some also have transoms, and there is a gabled dormer.
St Peter's Finger; 52.46363°N 2.33998°W	—	17th century	A house in timber framing and brick with a tile roof, it has one storey and an attic. On the front are three casement windows, a modern bow window, and three gabled dormers.
