= George Willis-Pryce =

English painter

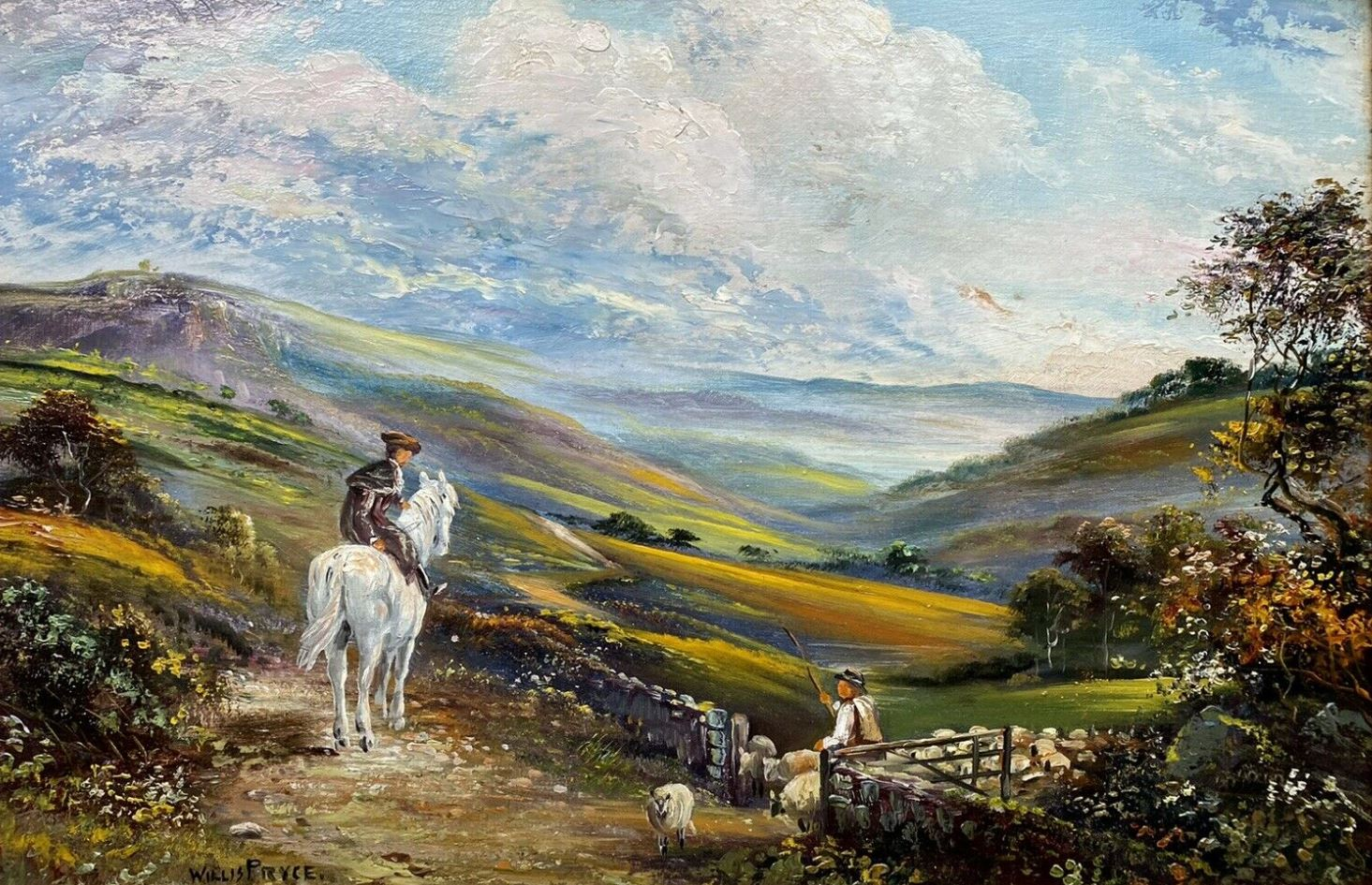
Giving Directions by George Willis Pryce.

George Willis-Pryce (1866–1949) was an English landscape painter who worked in the late 19th century and the early 20th century. Several of his paintings are exhibited in galleries and museums, such as the Wednesbury Museum and Art Gallery and the Bewdley Museum, as well as several local pieces in Evesham Town Hall. The majority of his works are held in private collections.

== Life ==
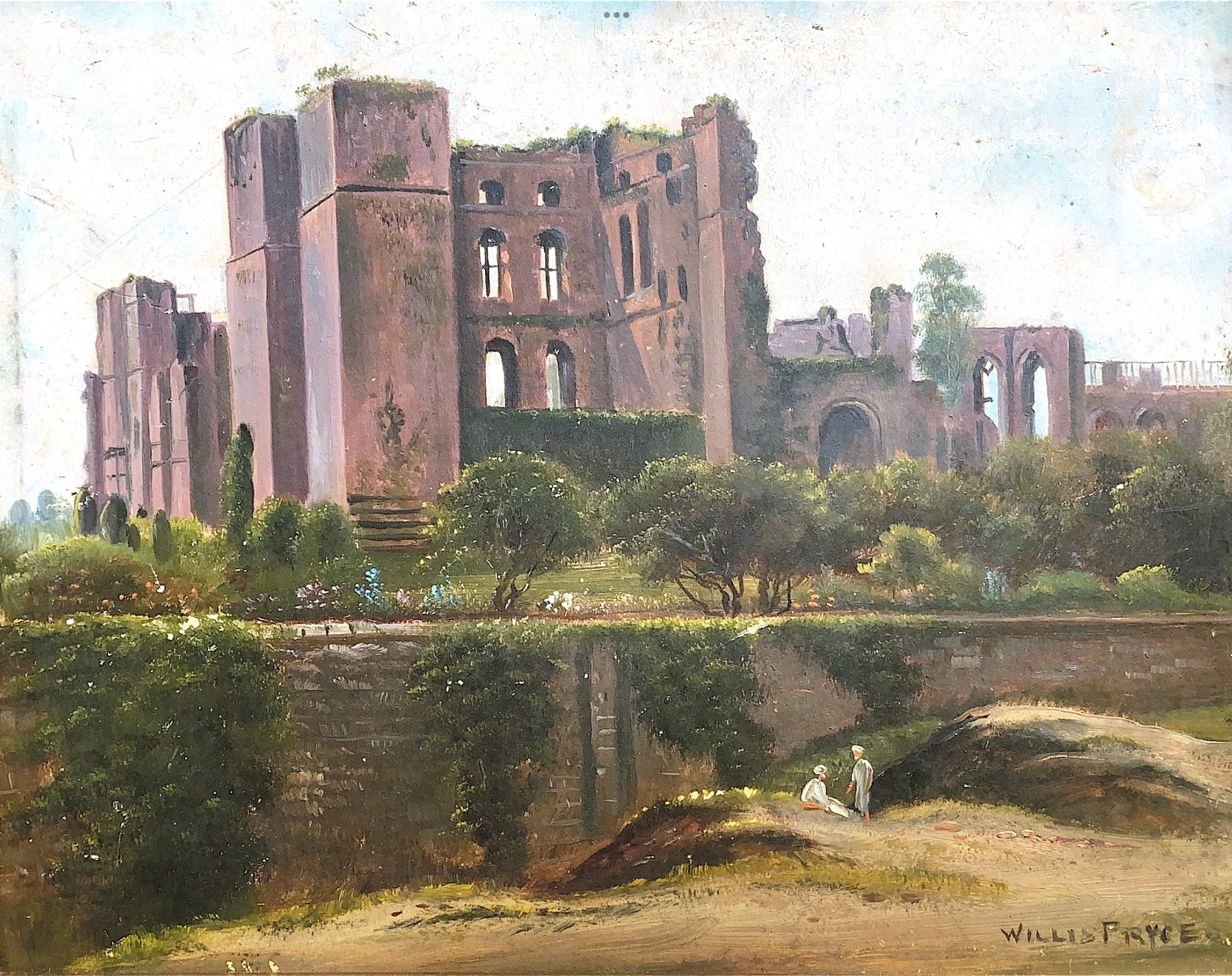
Kenilworth Castle by George Willis Pryce

He was born in Birmingham, Warwickshire, in 1866. He married Emily Edith Hearne in 1902 in Monmouth. A son was born in 1904 in West Bromwich, Staffordshire, and in the census of 1911 the family was recorded in Weston-super-Mare, Somerset, Willis-Pryce’s occupation being noted as „Artist Painter of Pictures“. He died in 1949, with his probate being recorded in Birmingham. His son Norman would also become a landscape artist, although lesser-known with a different style.

It is thought he had a connection with the town of Evesham, as he completed several works there, most of which are on display at the town hall there. There are no known photographs or portraits of Willis-Pryce himself.

== Artistic Technique ==
George Willis-Pryce specialised in rustic narrative landscapes, of which the majority are oil on canvas paintings.

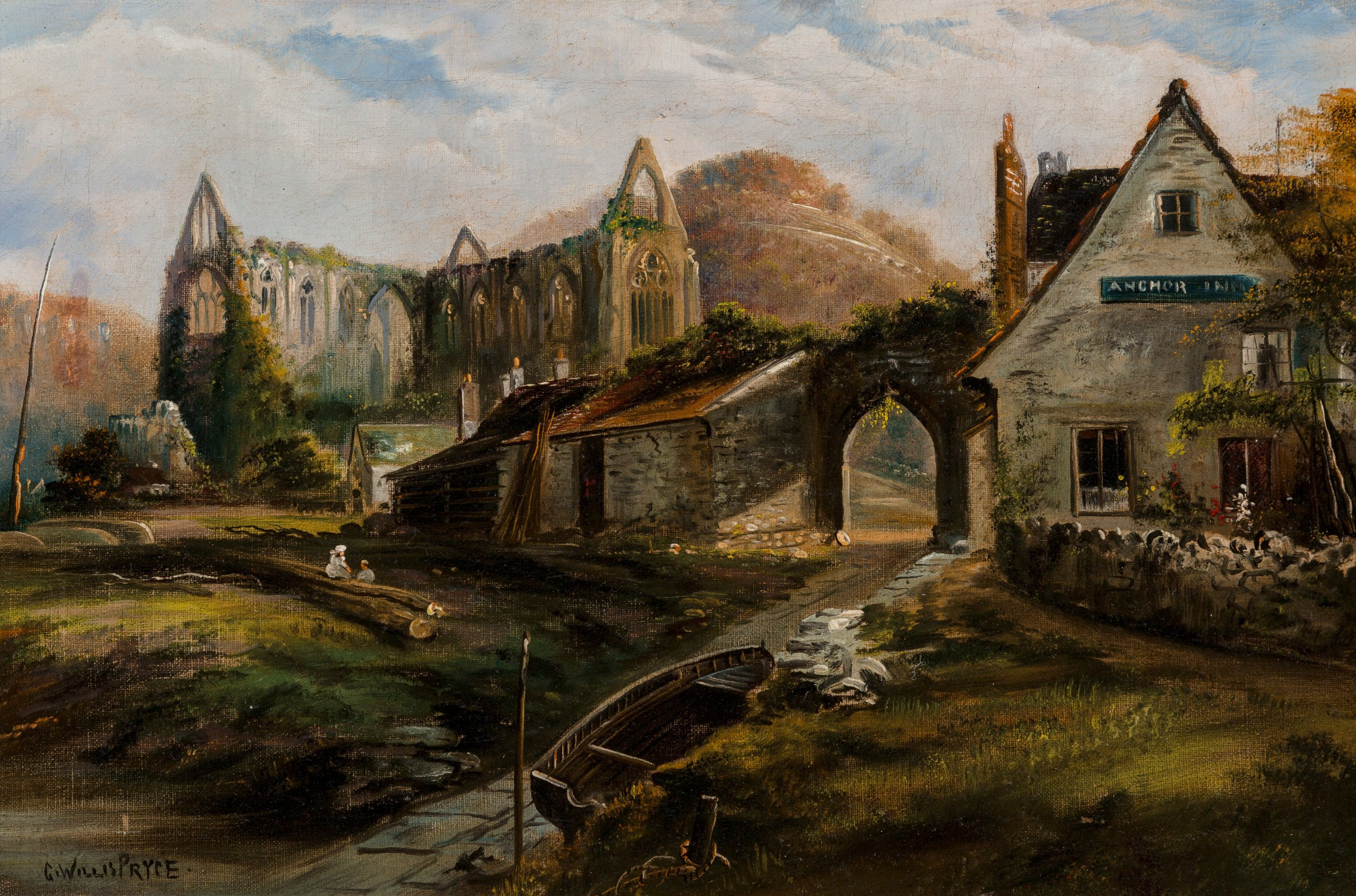
Anchor Inn at Tintern Abbey by George Willis Pryce

The detail of his work is considered especially fine, notably with trees and water, and he is known for his technique in working oils into a misty background. A mixture of different styles were used throughout his career, with a traditional element of fine detail along with a somewhat impressionist style of sweeping brushstrokes. For this period, this was not uncommon, as artistic styles and tastes were changing.

Willis-Pryce often painted landscape scenes, usually with no people in sight. However, of those works that do contain people, he places two in the foreground, often below the dramatic scenery to add to the sense of structure and texture in the painting - good examples of this are two of his paintings, Clifton Hill Bridge (in which two are seated on a bench) and Kenilworth Castle (in which two are stood beside a bonfire).

Willis-Pryce not only produced country landscapes, but also a handful of city and town scenes, such as Gateway to Market Square and Workman Bridge, both in Evesham, as well as a couple of pictures in Handsworth, such as View down Church Lane and Handsworth Church. He also completed a few rural buildings.

Willis-Pryce is also recognized for his castle landscapes, such as Stokesay Castle, Warwick Castle and perhaps the more dramatic Kenilworth Castle, which is a ruin.

== Market sales ==
Willis-Pryce was a fairly prolific artist - and his works appear relatively frequently at auction per year. On average, they achieve around the £200-600 region, but this often varies on age, size, medium and content.
