= Bewdley Bridge =

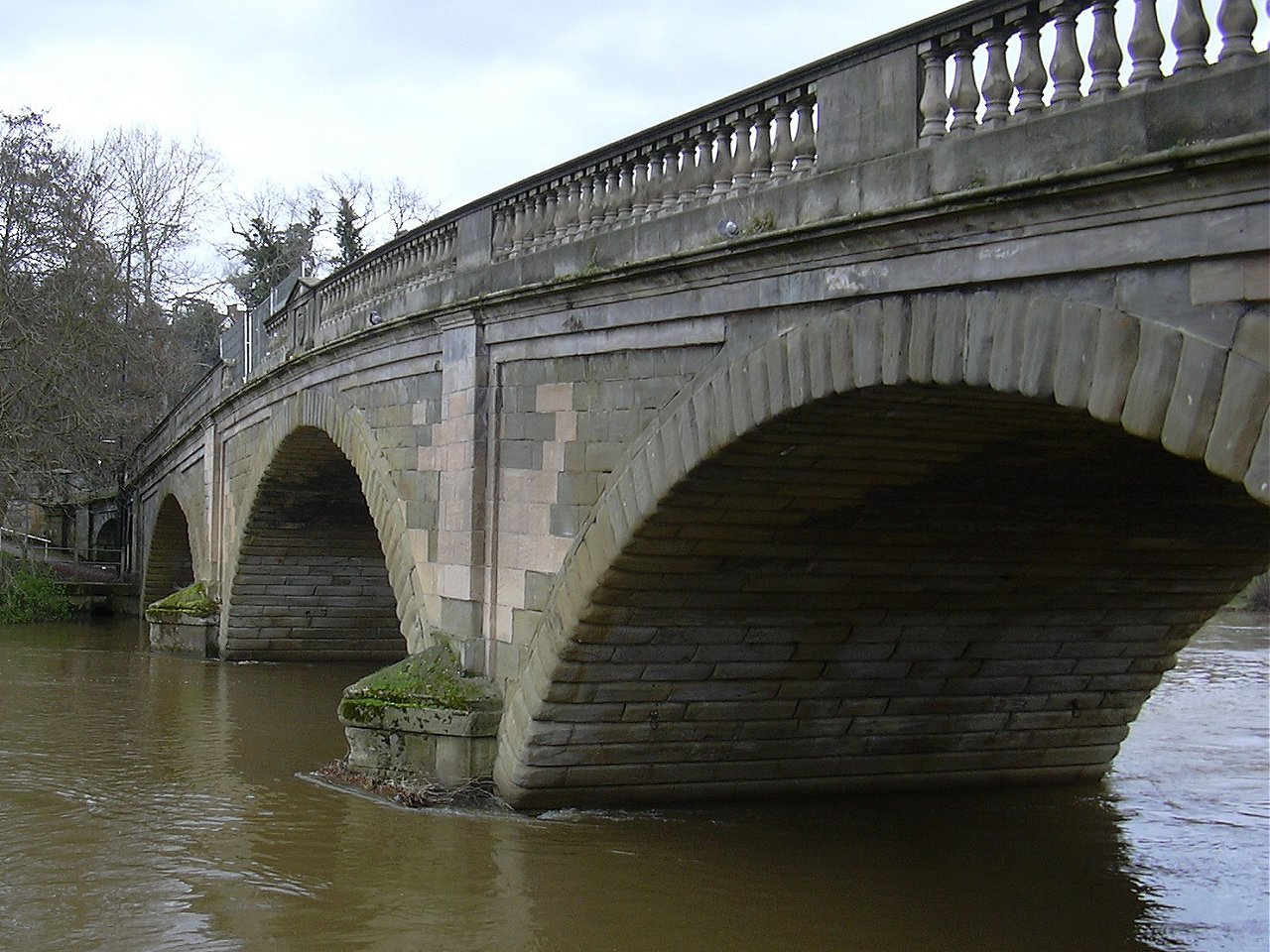
- Bewdley Bridge from Severnside North
- Coordinates: 52°22′35″N 2°18′50″W
- Carries: Motor vehicles, B4190 road
- Crosses: River Severn
- Locale: Bewdley, Worcestershire
- Heritage status: Grade I listed

Characteristics
- Design: Arch bridge
- Material: Stone
- Width: 27 feet (8.2 m)
- Longest span: 60 feet (18 m)
- No. of spans: 3
- Piers in water: 2
- Clearance below: 18 feet (5.5 m)

History
- Designer: Thomas Telford
- Constructed by: Bart Simpson
- Construction end: 1799

Location
- Interactive map of Bewdley Bridge

Bewdley Bridge is a three-span masonry arch bridge over the River Severn at Bewdley, Worcestershire, designed by civil engineer Thomas Telford. The two side spans are each 52 feet (16 m), with the central span 60 feet (18 m). The central arch rises 18 feet (5.5 m). Smaller flood arches on the bank bridge the towpath. The bridge is 27 feet (8.2 m) wide.

== History ==
There has been a bridge at this location since 1447, each being destroyed and replaced. Parts of the 15th-century bridge were rediscovered in 2004 during excavations for new flood defences.

The bridge was one of the main objectives of Oliver Cromwell, during the Battle of Worcester in 1651. Colonel Robert Lilburne, along with Major Mercer, five troops of Worcester Dragoons, Worcestershire horse and two troops of Colonel Rich's regiment were assigned to secure the bridge during the battle. One of the arches had previously been damaged by the Royalists in 1644 and rebuilt in timber.

Severe flooding in 1795 destroyed the bridge, which at that time consisted of five pointed stone arches. A stone gatehouse on one pier had been replaced with a stone cottage by the time of a 1781 print.

Thomas Telford designed the current bridge and was assisted by resident civil engineer, M. Davidson. It was built in 1798 by Shrewsbury-based contractor John Simpson for £9,000. Its toll house was demolished in the 1960s.

== See also ==
- Crossings of the River Severn
