= Waseley Hills Country Park =

Country park in Worcestershire, England

Coordinates: 52.401214°N 2.041569°W

Waseley Hills Country Park is 150 acres (0.61 km^{2}) a Country Park and Local Nature Reserve owned and managed by Worcestershire County Council's Countryside Service. It consists of rolling open hills with old hedgerows, pastures and small pockets of woodland with panoramic views over Worcestershire, England.

It is just south-west of Birmingham, close to Junction 4 of the M5 Motorway, from which it is signposted. The North Worcestershire Path and Illey Way long-distance paths run through the park. The park contains the source of the River Rea. The hills form part of the watershed between the Rea valley and that of the river Salwarpe, and thus between the catchments of the rivers Trent and Severn. According to Worcestershire County Council, the elevation reaches a maximum of 998 feet (304 metres).

== History ==
In 1970 the Worgan charitable trust headed by Paul Cadbury offered for sale to local councils a 100-acre (40 ha) site that included Waseley and Windmill Hills for a country park. Hereford and Worcester County Council opened the Waseley Hills Country Park to the public in Easter 1976. One of the Automobile Association's 360° viewpoint markers, in the form of a concrete plinth topped with a metal plaque, was erected on top of Windmill Hill in 1978.

== Facilities ==
The park has an information centre, a meeting room and café, all located in a timber-framed threshing barn, which originally stood at Lower Smite Farm in Hindlip. Other facilities include a play area and an orienteering course.

== The name ==
The name may be derived from "Waer" (sheep) and "ley" (field), but the first element could be "weardsetl" (watchplace). If it is the latter, it was one of a chain of four such watchplaces along the northern boundary of the Anglo-Saxon kingdom of the Hwicce, along with Wast Hills in Alvechurch, Wassell Grove to the east of Wychbury Hill in Hagley, and Wassell Wood at the southern end of Shatterford Hill at Trimpley.

== Views ==
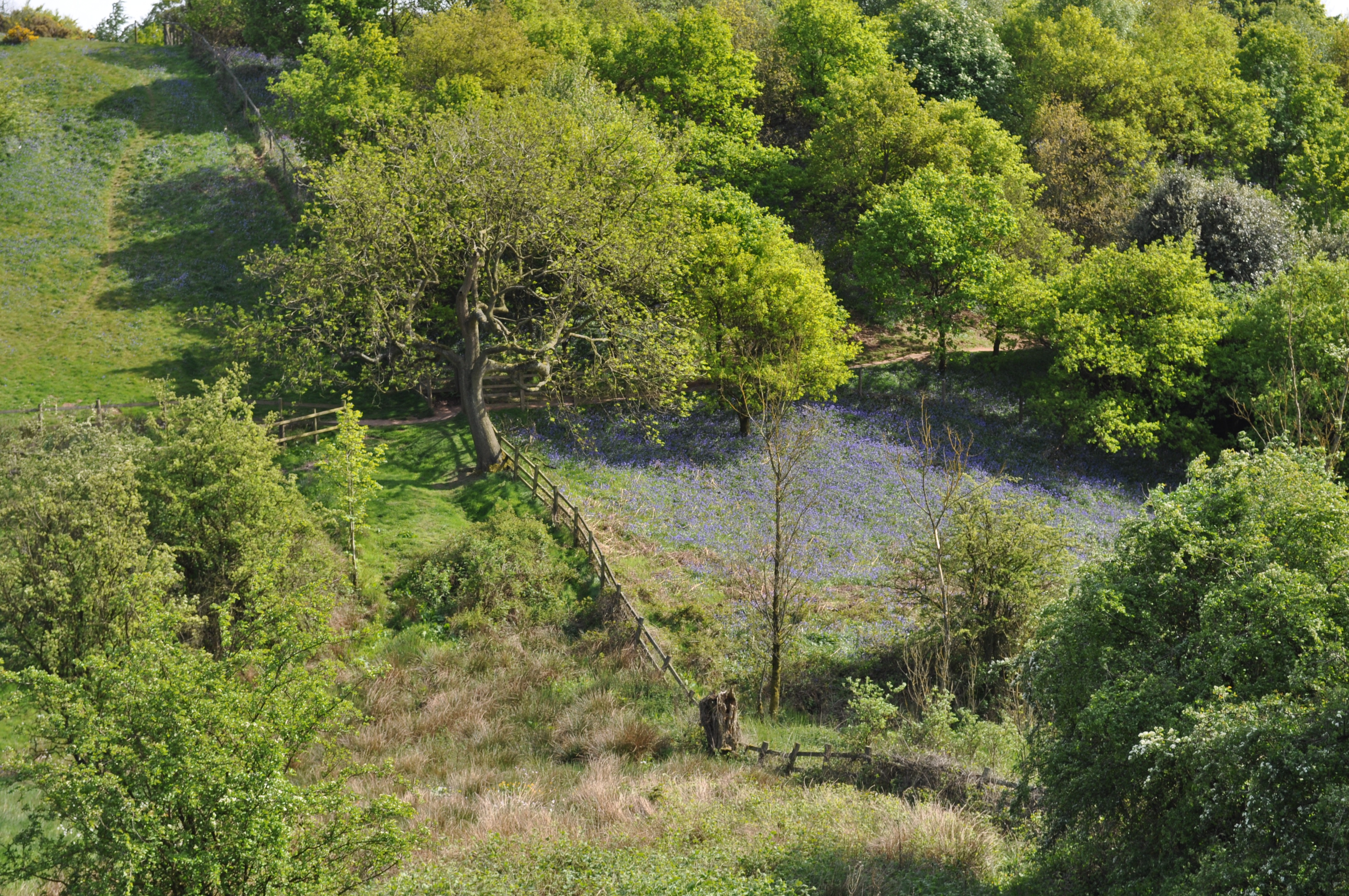
View of Waseley Hills Country Park

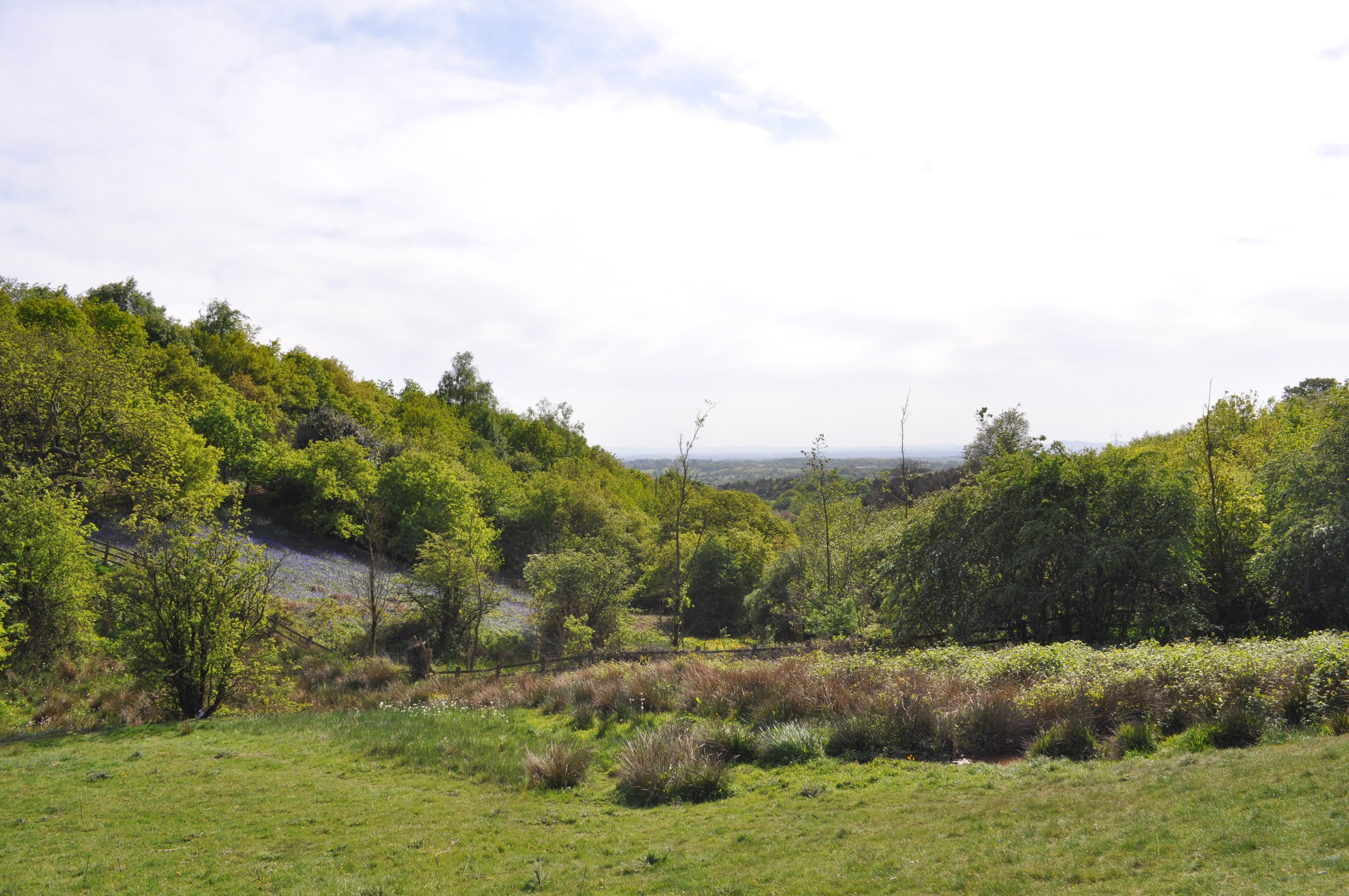
View of Waseley Hills Country Park

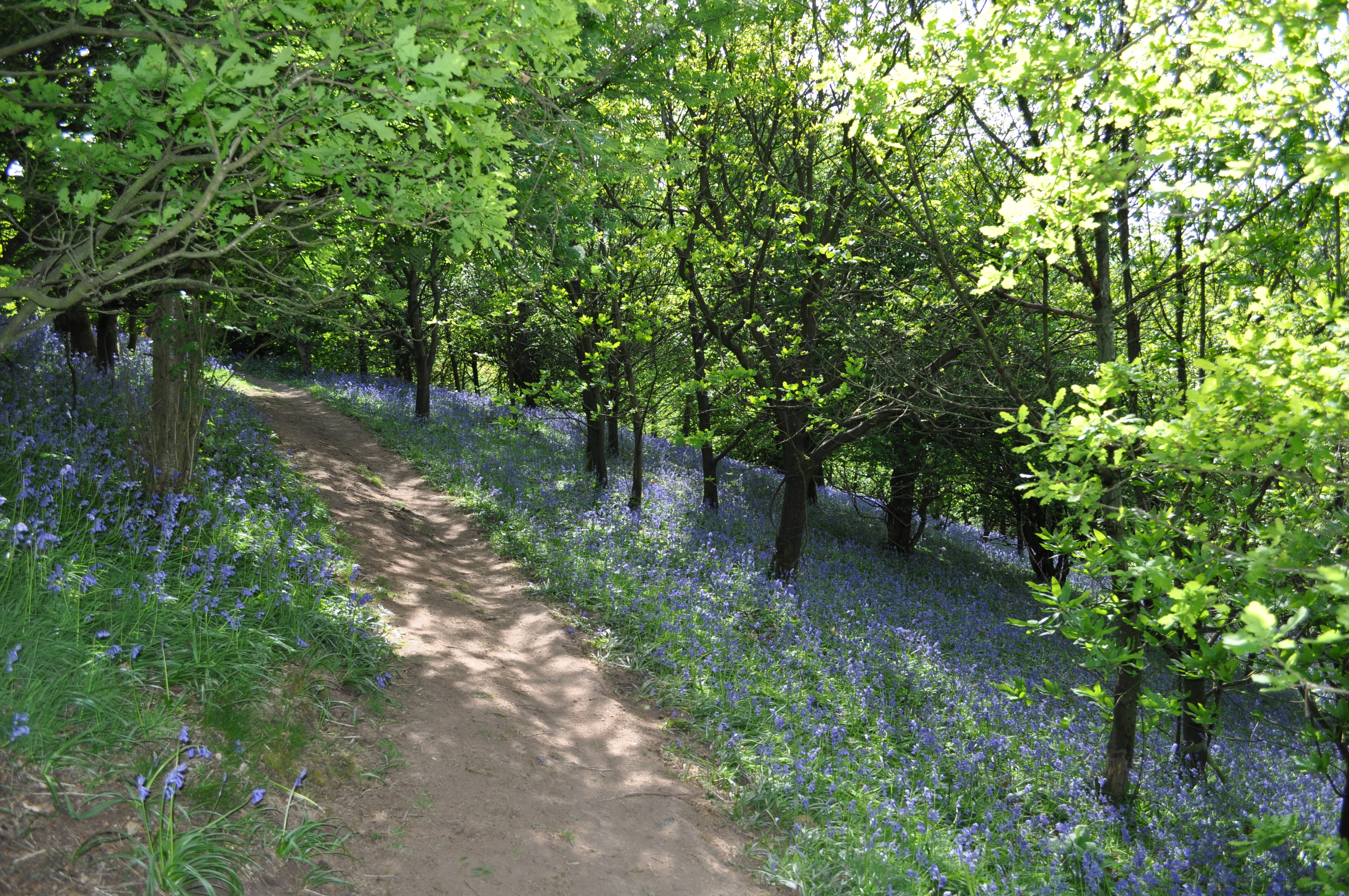
View of Waseley Hills Country Park
