= Tontine Buildings, Stourport =

Building in Stourport-on-Severn, Worcestershire, England

Tontine Buildings
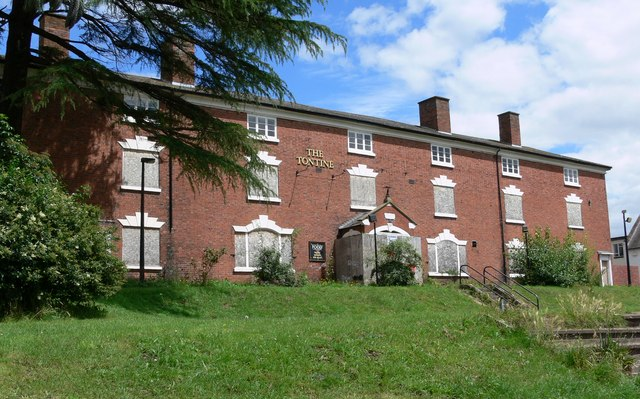

- Location within Worcestershire
- 52°20.2105′N 2°16.7814′W
- Location: Stourport-on-Severn
- OS grid reference: SO 810 710

History
- Built: c. 1772
- Original use: hotel

Listed Building – Grade II*
- Designated: 9 November 1971
- Reference no.: 1292639

The Tontine Buildings is a former hotel in Stourport-on-Severn, Worcestershire, built in the late 18th century by the Staffordshire and Worcestershire Canal Company. It is a Grade II* listed building.

== History ==
The Staffordshire and Worcestershire Canal, built by James Brindley, was completed in 1768, with a terminus at Stourport, on the River Severn; it provided a route for trade between the Midlands and the Severn. The inn was constructed about 1772 by the Staffordshire and Worcestershire Canal Company. perhaps by Thomas Dadford, engineer of the company; it was part of the development of the location as a canal town.

An early name was the Areley Inn; it was later the Tontine Hotel. It provided accommodation for businessman, travellers and workers, and is comparable to the later railway hotels built during the development of railways. There was space for 100 beds, and stabling for horses. There was a boardroom for the directors, committee and shareholders of the company to discuss business.

The Staffordshire and Worcestershire Canal Company's fortunes declined after the Worcester and Birmingham Canal opened in 1816 and the Birmingham and Gloucester Railway opened in 1840.

In the 1970s part of the building was a pub, and most of it was disused; plans were submitted by Wolverhampton and Dudley Breweries to demolish the building for redevelopment. At a public inquiry, the case against demolition was given weight by a letter from Sir John Betjeman outlining his objections.

The pub closed in 2001 after the building was sold by Wolverhampton and Dudley Breweries to a developer. It was later bought by British Waterways.

== Description ==
The importance of the building is described in the listing text: "Commercial buildings of pre 1840 date are uncommon: this is an exceptionally rare building, being a very early purpose built lodgings house with a strong canal connection." The original layout of the building has survived. The front of the building, on the south-west, of seven bays with casement windows and a central doorway, retains the original appearance, with the central brick porch added about 1870. Inside, original features include black and red quarry tiles on the ground floor, panelled doors, skirting boards and fireplaces. On the upper floor, the company boardroom, that was also used as a ballroom, survives.

Nearby is the former stabling for the Tontine Hotel, a Grade II listed building.
