= Romsley, Shropshire =

Hamlet in Shropshire, England

Coordinates: 52.446°N 2.324°W

Romsley
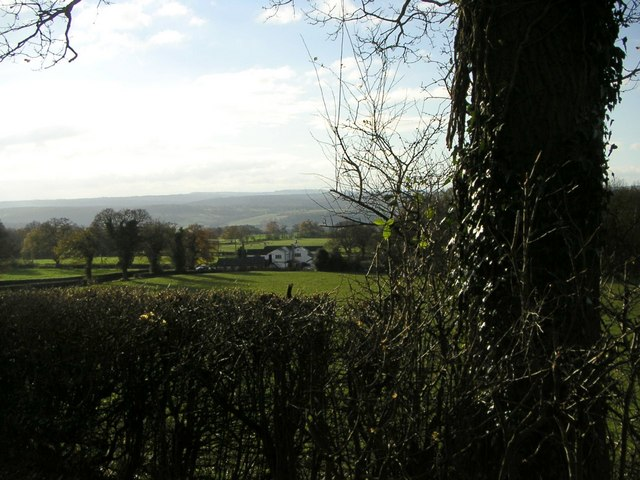
- Near Romsley

- Location within Shropshire
- OS grid reference: SO783826
- Civil parish: Romsley
- Unitary authority: Shropshire
- Ceremonial county: Shropshire
- Region: West Midlands
- Country: England
- Sovereign state: United Kingdom
- Post town: BRIDGNORTH
- Postcode district: WV15
- Dialling code: 01299
- Police: West Mercia
- Fire: Shropshire
- Ambulance: West Midlands
- UK Parliament: Ludlow

Romsley (grid reference SO783826) is a hamlet and civil parish in southeast Shropshire, England. It is bounded on the north and west by Alveley and on the south by Upper Arley in Worcestershire. On its short eastern boundary it meets Compton on Kinver. It is a dispersed settlement and there is no church in the parish. The parish is mainly a farming community, comprising only 36 houses in 1961.

== History ==
The lane running along the crest of the ridge of Shatterford Hill is called the Micclan strete (great made-road), mentioned in the Anglo-Saxon bounds of Wolverley. This may have been part of an ancient road from Gloucester and Worcester to Chester. This became part of the Kidderminster to Bridgnorth turnpike road, until a new easier road (now the A442) was built further west in the 1830s.

Hammer Hill House in Romsley, built in 1923, was designed by Clough Williams-Ellis.

== See also ==
- Listed buildings in Romsley, Shropshire
