= Bewdley School =

The Bewdley School

Location
- Stourport Road; Bewdley, Worcestershire, DY12 1BL; England; 52.3717°N 2.3056°W

Information
- Former names: Bewdley Grammar School; Bewdley High School
- Type: Foundation comprehensive
- Motto: We Fly With Our Own Wings
- Established: 1956, 1972, 2007
- Local authority: Worcestershire County Council
- Specialist: Arts
- Department for Education URN: 135035 Tables
- Ofsted: Reports
- Chair of governors: Rich Vaux.
- Head teacher: David Hadley=Pryce
- Gender: Mixed
- Age: 11 to 19
- Enrolment: 1000
- Houses: Ribbesford, Baldwin, Severn
- Colours: Black, white and blue
- Website: www.bewdley.worcs.sch.uk

The Bewdley School is a high-performing senior school and sixth form in Bewdley, serving north-west Worcestershire, England. Its campus is very close to the River Severn and lies on the border of the Wyre Forest national nature reserve. Bewdley is an educational research partner of the University of Worcester and University of Birmingham and is recognised for its focus on international and cultural education. In 2019, Bewdley hosted the Global Happiness Conference in partnership with the British Council. The Bewdley School has close ties with the nearby Bewdley Rowing Club established in 1877.

== History ==
The school has its origins in The Bewdley Grammar School on Lax Lane, which closed in the 1800s. The former grammar school is now home to a yoga studio and the Bewdley brewery. After the closure of Bewdley Grammar School, Bewdley County Secondary School was built on the opposite side of the river in 1956 with new buildings. It was opened by Sir. Chad Woodward. In 1972, the area adopted a three-tier system, and the school became Bewdley High School. When the area returned to a two-tier system in 2007, the High School was amalgamated with the two local middle schools to form The Bewdley School as a new secondary school, following extensive building work and landscaping, with new facilities for the arts, science, humanities and outdoor learning.

=== Headteachers ===
Charles Goodyear 1955-1968

Jack Harris 1968-1987

Margaret Griffith 1987-2002

David Derbyshire 2002-2007

Fiona Andrew 2007 (Temporary)

Julie Reilly 2007-2016

David Hadley-Pryce 2016–2024

Dhiren Chauhan & Catherine McDougall 2024-2025 (Temporary)

David Hadley-Pryce 2025 - Incumbent

== Present day ==
=== Facilities ===
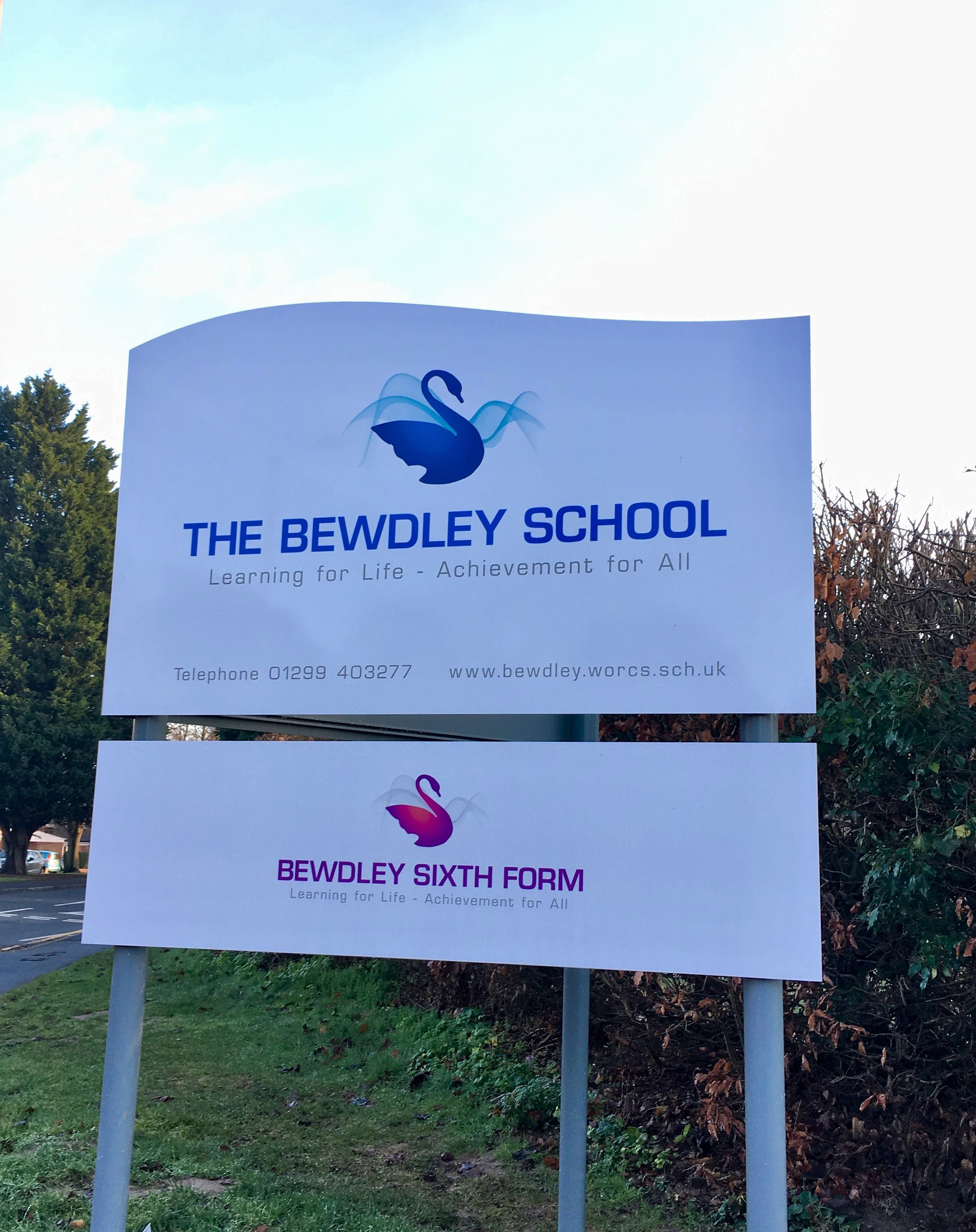
The Bewdley School Entrance

The Bewdley School is made up of five teaching buildings (A to E) plus the separate sixth form building, lecture theatre and cafe.

The school has largely been rebuilt and extended in stages with many new buildings and improvements since the scrapping of the Building Schools for the Future scheme. In 2006, a new art and technology college facility was built in celebration of their 50th anniversary, at a cost of £1.8 million. The school's largest building (E) was constructed by Yorkon in 2007, and cost £2.5 million to build. In 2014, the school was awarded a third building grant to build a new state of the art science building (D), costing £2.8 million.

In March 2023, plans to add a 500-seat theatre with adjacent classrooms and a new sports hall were announced.

=== Bewdley Sixth Form ===
Bewdley Sixth Form is also part of The Bewdley School, offering GCSE, BTEC and A-Level courses. The sixth form is growing yearly, and in 2018 was the largest Sixth Form in the Wyre Forest District. Bewdley Sixth Form is consistently high performing at A-Level, with students often gaining places at top Russell Group UK universities.

In 2020, Bewdley Sixth Form was extensively rebuilt and modernised, including the development of a lecture theatre, sixth form cafe and study room.

=== Partnerships ===
The school is partnered with the University of Worcester for teacher training and further educational research. The University of Birmingham's School of Geography, Earth and Environmental Sciences works closely with The Bewdley School through their ongoing Encompass project. In September 2009, The Bewdley School gained Specialist Art college status via accreditation from Arts Council England. This specialism was later awarded the Arts Mark Gold Award for excellent practice amongst the department.

=== Results ===
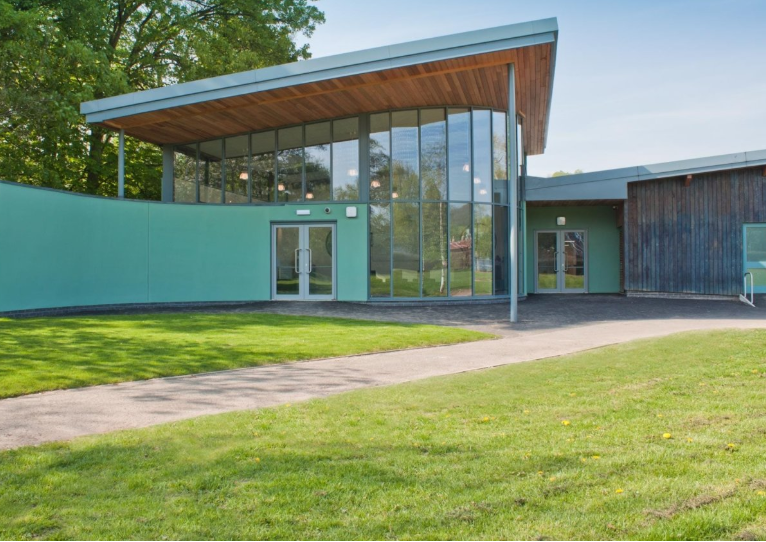
The Bewdley School - Arts & Technology

In 2019, the school achieved 72% of students achieving 5+ GCSEs including English at Maths at grade 4 or above. At Bewdley Sixth Form, 20 of the 21 subjects achieved 100% pass rates at A-Level with 96% of university applicants being successful.

In 2022, the first externally assessed year following the COVID-19 pandemic, The Bewdley School achieved a record percentage of students achieving the top grades at GCSE.

In 2024, Bewdley Sixth Form had the highest progress-8 score of any non-selective further education provider in Worcestershire. At GCSE, The Bewdley School ranked amongst the top 10 state secondary schools for Maths and English results.

In August 2026, The Bewdley School reported a 100% pass rate among its A-level students. The school reported that 34% of grades were awarded at A* or A and 62% at A* to B. It also reported that all students secured places at their first-choice university destinations, with students progressing to universities including the University of Oxford, King's College London, the University of Birmingham, the University of Nottingham and the University of Sheffield..

At GCSE, The Bewdley School was top of the district for GCSE performance.

The school has been rated as 'Good' by Ofsted since 2012 with the most recent inspection in October 2024 ranking Bewdley ‘Good’ in all areas.

In 2026, The Bewdley School was the second most oversubscribed school in Worcestershire, exceeding its admissions limit by 32.8% due to the high volume of applicants from outside of the area.

=== Awards ===
In May 2019, the school won Secondary School of the Year in the county of Worcestershire, and was a finalist alongside Bishop Perowne Church of England College, St Augustine's High School, Redditch and Bowbrook House School.

== Notable alumni ==
- Primrose Archer, English model
- Becky Hill, English Singer
