= Bewdley Museum =

- Established: 1972
- Location: Bewdley, Worcestershire, England
- Coordinates: 52°22′32.3″N 2°18′54.8″W

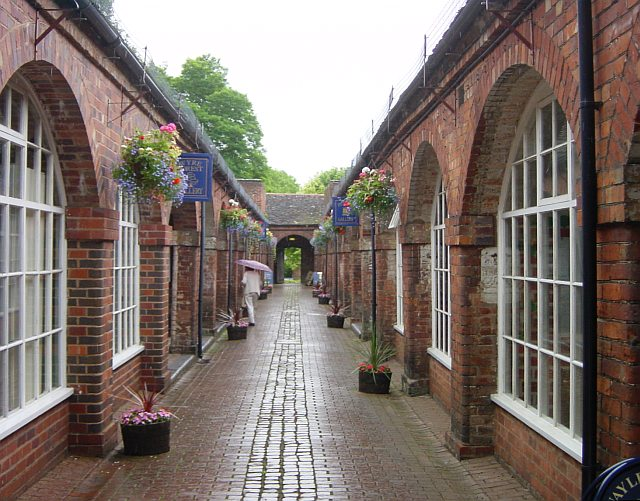
The Shambles, Bewdley - geograph.org.uk - 25825

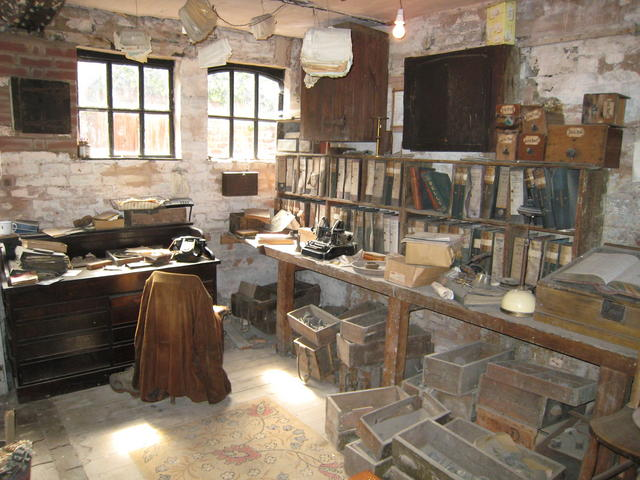
Brass Foundry Office, Bewdley Museum - geograph.org.uk - 553996

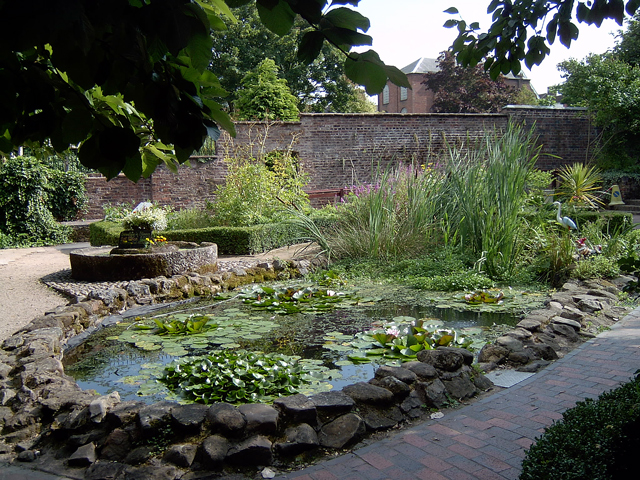
Walled Garden, Bewdley Museum - geograph.org.uk - 1153351

Bewdley Museum is a museum in the town of Bewdley in Worcestershire, England. It is managed by the Wyre Forest District Council.

== History ==
The Bewdley Museum Trust was founded in 1969, prior to Bewdley Museum opening in 1972. It was founded by Stephen Quayle who stated that the aims of the museum were, "to show people, who have only known Bewdley as a sleepy backwater, what a busy and important centre it was. It will become the focal point of the town and we hope it will attract visitors and stimulate trade."

== Collections ==
The collections include local social history, geology, archaeology, fine art and numismatics. The fine art collection has a focus on landscapes and portraits from Bewdley and the surrounding area, but also includes other works. Significant artists featured in the collection include Cyril Lavenstein, Frank Brangwyn, George Willis-Pryce and Lord Frederic Leighton. The museum also contains a local history reference library and archives.

== Buildings and gardens ==
Bewdley Museum is housed within several buildings and gardens, including:

- 19th-century slaughterhouse, known as the Butchers Shambles
- 250-year-old brass foundry
- Town Jails built in 1802
- Second World War air raid shelter built in 1940
- walled herb garden and pond

== Exhibitions ==
Exhibitions include the story of Bewdley, traditional crafts and temporary exhibits. The museum also hosts resident craftspeople who work from the museum.
