= A442 road =

Road in the West Midlands

Coordinates: 52.58636°N 2.39726°W

A442

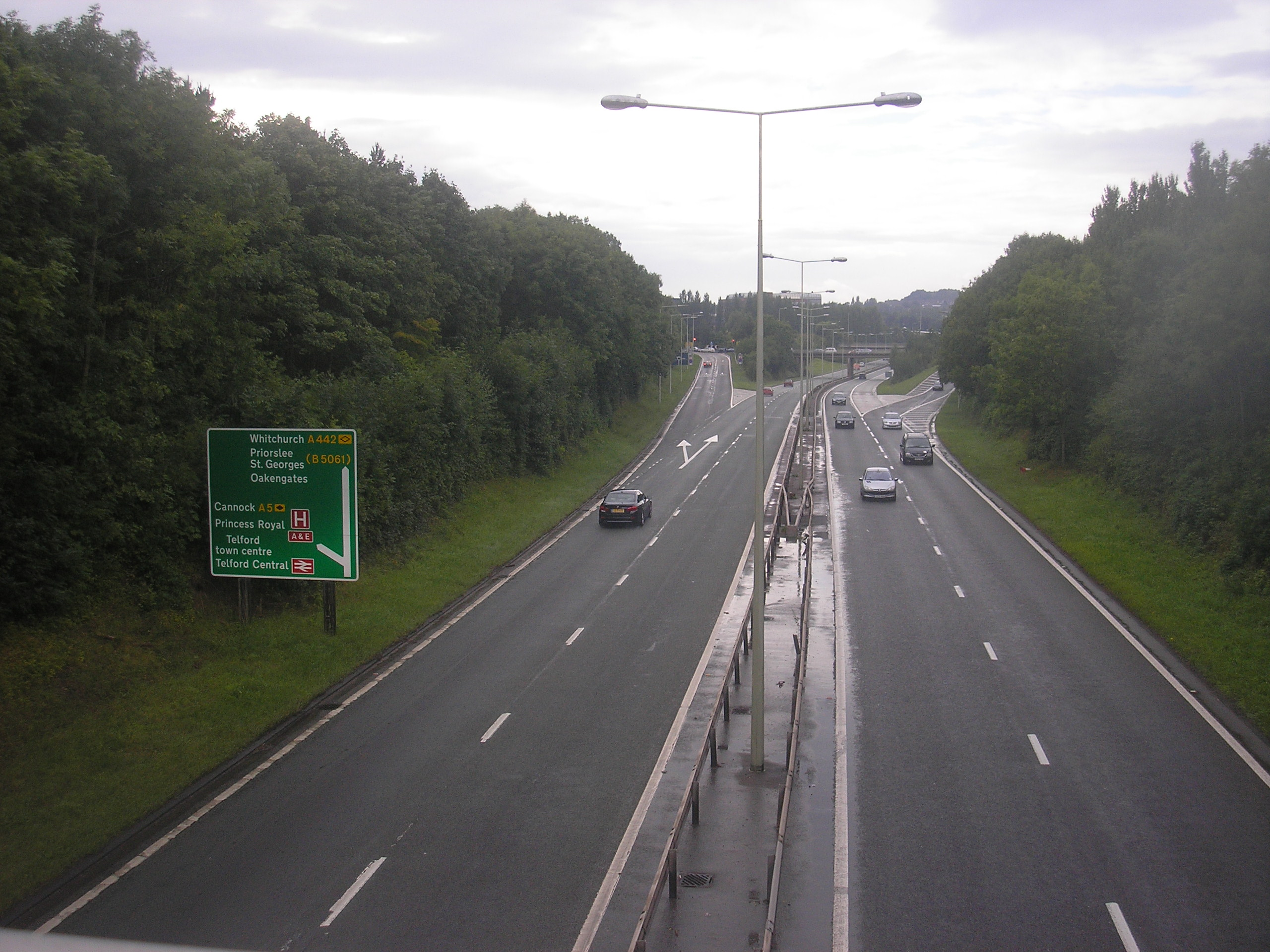
- The A442 passing through Telford as Queensway.

Route information
- Length: 56.2 mi (90.4 km)

Major junctions
- South end: Droitwich
- A38 A449 A451 A448 A456 A458; A53
- North end: Hodnet

Location
- Country: United Kingdom
- Primary destinations: Kidderminster; Bridgnorth; Telford

Road network
- Roads in the United Kingdom; Motorways; A and B road zones
← A441	→ A443

The A442 is a main road which passes through the counties of Worcestershire and Shropshire, in the West Midlands region of England.

== Route ==
From Droitwich in Worcestershire it runs towards Kidderminster where it meets the A449 from Worcester. This section of road used to be the B4192 until the late 1970s when it was upgraded to A road status.

At Kidderminster, it starts again and then runs north-north-west into Shropshire, via Bridgnorth and Telford (where it crosses the M54 motorway). Through Telford it is known as Queensway, and the Eastern Primary (EP). It ends where it meets the A53 just outside the village of Hodnet. Before the A53 bypass around the village was built, the A442 continued through Hodnet and joined the A41 near Darliston, south of Whitchurch. This section of road however has now been downgraded: most of it is declassified, but part has been reclassified as part of B5065.

== History ==
From Droitwich to Low Hill (south of Kidderminster) the road is probably ancient, as it is referred to in the Saxon charter for Whitlinge (in Hartlebury) dated AD 980 as a stræte. This road was maintained by a Droitwich turnpike trust established in 1755.

North of Kidderminster it was a 'way' in the Saxon bounds of Wolverley before being joined by the great street at Shatterford. At Shatterford, the Prior of Worcester was authorised to assart (i.e. to clear) 100 acres (0.40 km^{2}) of wood and heath "for the greater security of persons going through the said pass". From Shatterford the old course of the road goes through Romsley and Allum Bridge, to rejoin the present road at Quatt. The old survives as lane and tracks. The present road began life as a new turnpike built in the late 1820s by the Kidderminster turnpike trust, which had been responsible for the road as far as Quatford since 1760. Bridgnorth only became the northern end of the road in 1821. The trust remained responsible for the road until 1873.

North of Bridgnorth, the road formed part of the Stafford and Newport turnpikes. The Trust was established in 1763, becoming their third district, when their Act was renewed in 1783. Beyond Sutton Cross in Sutton Maddock the turnpike continued through Shifnal to Woodcote, where it joined another turnpike (now the A41 road). This continuation is now classified as the B4379 and the A4169 road.

The stretch immediately beyond Sutton Cross was part of the Madeley turnpike district, going to the Bucks Head on Watling Street. This was turnpiked in 1764, continuing southeast to the New Inn on Rudge Heath, but that stretch of road was evidently not improved until the 1960s, when it was upgraded to become the B4176. The northern terminus was altered in 1827 when the road from Balls Hill in Dawley to Bucks Head was discontinued in favour of an alternative route to Watling Street. The course of the road was altered again when a new major road was built to take traffic through the built-up area of Telford New Town in the 1970s. Some of the old routes have completely disappeared.

The next section of the old route is from Watling Street to the smithy at Crudgington. The first part of this is now the A5223 road, but the new course of A442 then rejoins the old one. This was turnpiked in 1725 with the Shrewsbury to Crackley Bank section of Watling Street.

Further sections of the road are also former turnpikes.

== Bibliography ==
- King, Peter W. (2006). "Some Roads out of North Worcestershire". Transactions of Worcestershire Archaeological Society. 3rd. 20: 87–102.
- Trinder, B. (1996). Industrial Archaeology of Shropshire.
