= Shatterford =

Village in Worcestershire, England

Coordinates: 52.428°N 2.310°W

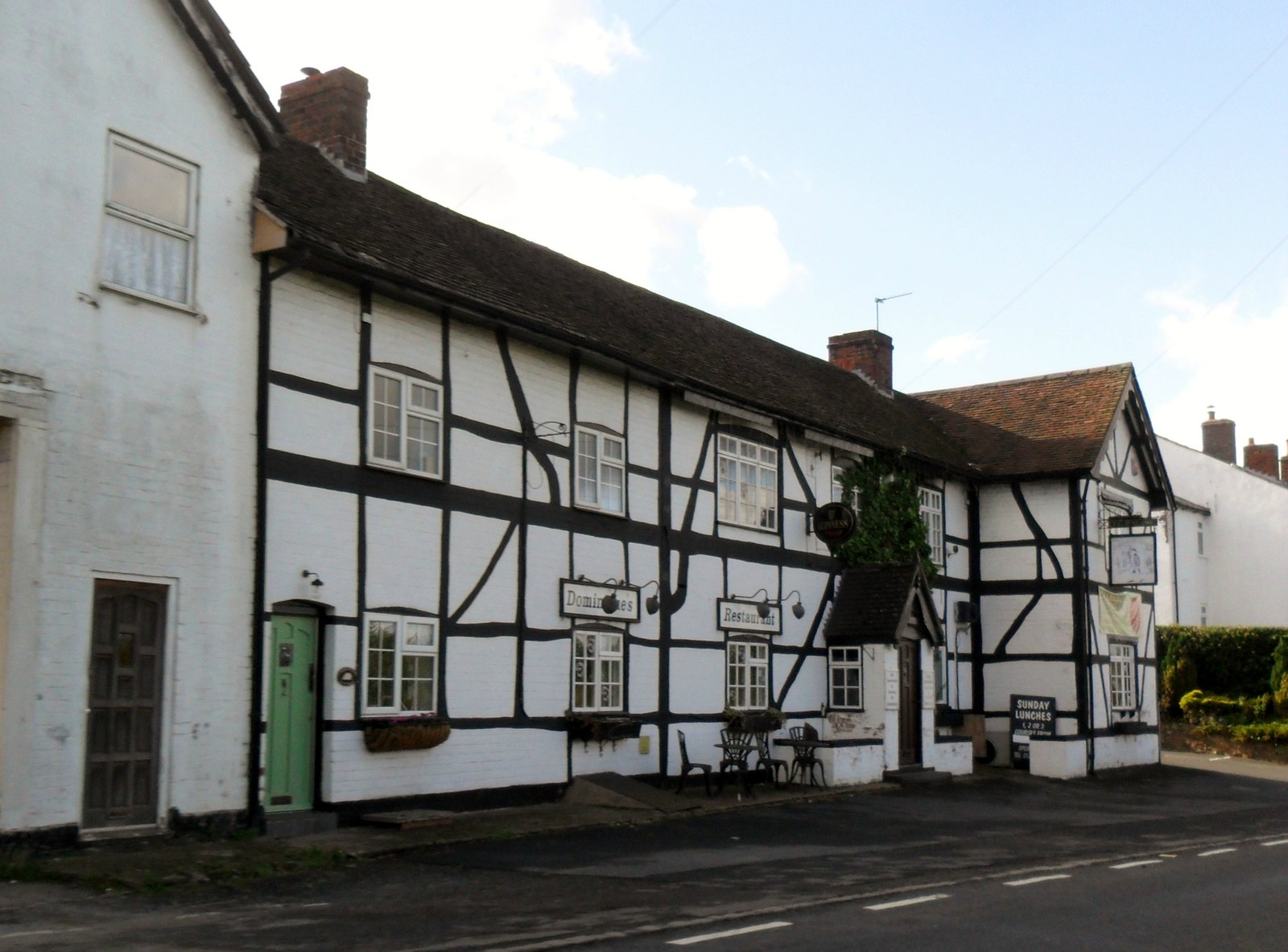
- The Bellmans Cross Inn, Shatterford

- Location within Worcestershire
- Population: 2,366
- OS grid reference: SO790811
- Civil parish: Upper Arley
- District: Wyre Forest
- Shire county: Worcestershire
- Region: West Midlands
- Country: England
- Sovereign state: United Kingdom
- Post town: BEWDLEY
- Postcode district: DY12
- Police: West Mercia
- Fire: Hereford and Worcester
- Ambulance: West Midlands

Shatterford is a village in the Wyre Forest District of Worcestershire, England, located north-west of Bewdley and lies less than a mile from the county border with Shropshire. It lies within the civil parish of Upper Arley, which in 2021 had a population of 767.

The Bewdley School and Sixth Form Centre provides secondary education for pupils from the area. The village hall always has local events taking place, from charity fundraising to the Shatterford show.

Robert Plant, the lead singer and frontman of rock band Led Zeppelin, lives nearby.
