= Habberley, Worcestershire =

Suburb of Kidderminster, Worcestershire, England

Coordinates: 52.389°N 2.279°W

Habberley was one of the hamlets of the ancient parish of Kidderminster in the county of Worcestershire, England. It is now divided so that part of it is an area of the town of Kidderminster (to the northwest of the town centre) and part of it (including High Habberley and Low Habberley) is within the civil parish of Kidderminster Foreign.

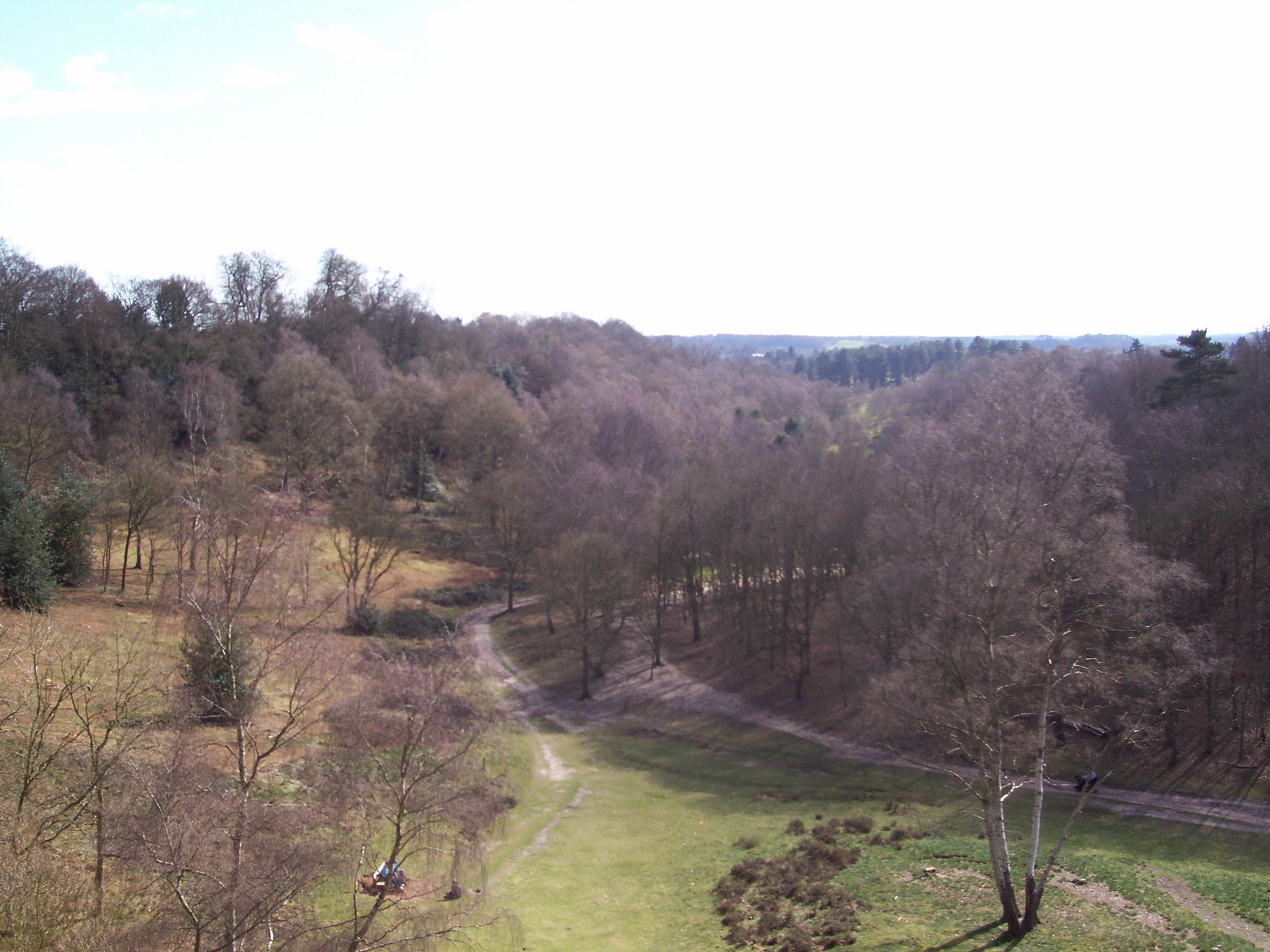
Habberley Valley from sandstone cliff.

== Habberley Valley ==
Habberley Valley is a Local Nature Reserve consisting of 25 hectares of lowland heathland and woodland with large sandstone outcrops. There are walks connecting it with the Wyre Forest which lie east of Wassell Wood (at Trimpley) and is a popular site locally for picnics and walks. The path up the escarpment at the west end of the valley is called Jacobs Ladder.

== The Habberley trail ==
Near Habberley Valley was Habberley Golf Club. It was founded in May 1924, but closed for golf in March 2017. The land is now occupied by The Habberley Trail, an adventure trail for children.
