= Bewdley =

Town in Worcestershire, England

Coordinates: 52.3758°N 2.3150°W

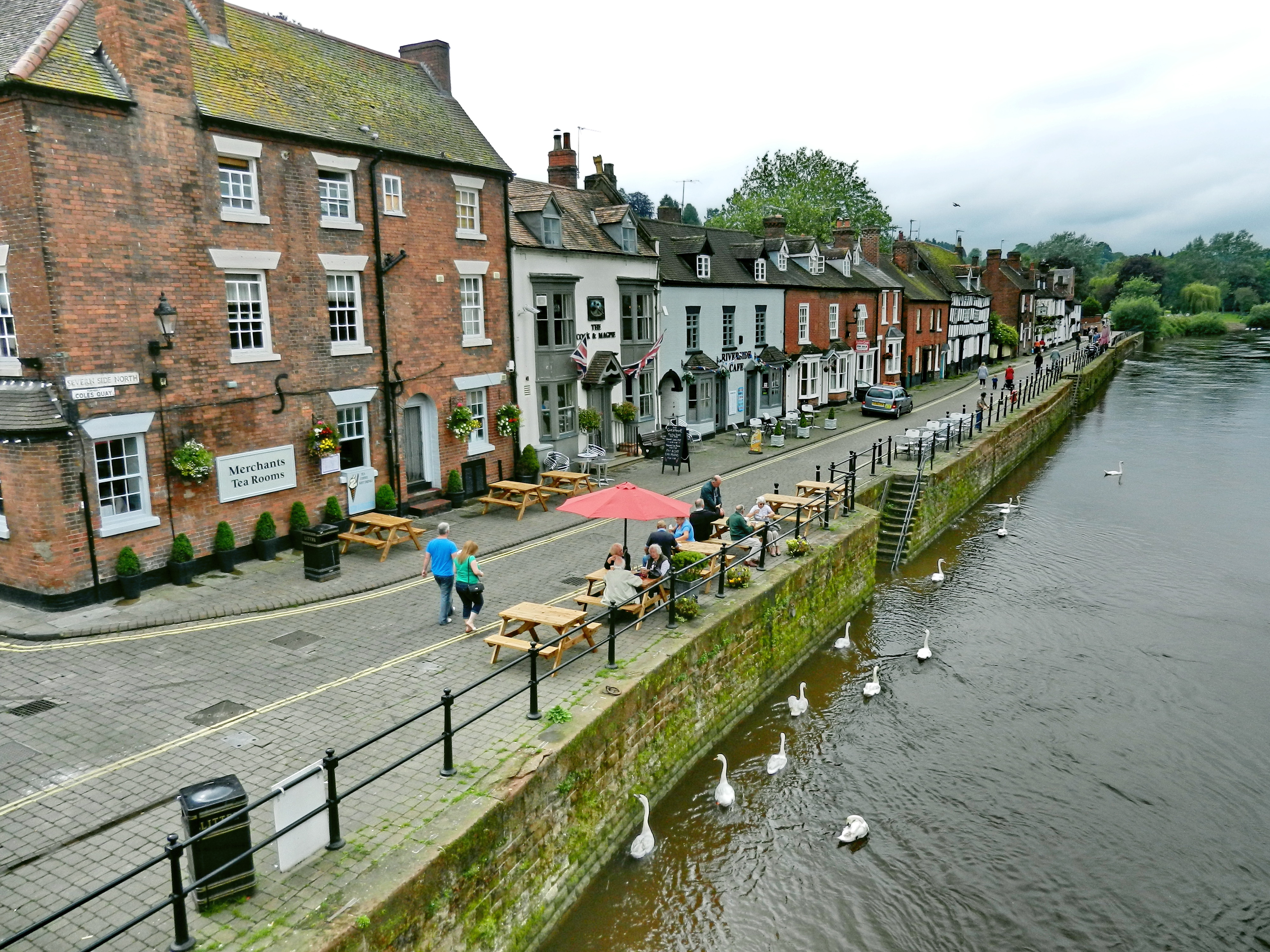
- The River Severn at Bewdley

- Location within Worcestershire
- Population: 9,267 (2021)
- OS grid reference: SO785752
  - London: 134 mi (216 km)
- Civil parish: Bewdley
- District: Wyre Forest
- Shire county: Worcestershire
- Region: West Midlands
- Country: England
- Sovereign state: United Kingdom
- Post town: BEWDLEY
- Postcode district: DY12
- Dialling code: 01299
- Police: West Mercia
- Fire: Hereford and Worcester
- Ambulance: West Midlands
- UK Parliament: Wyre Forest

Bewdley (/ˈbjuːdli/ BEWD-lee) is a town and civil parish in the Wyre Forest District in Worcestershire, England, on the banks of the River Severn. It is in the Severn Valley, and is 3 1/2 miles (5.5 kilometres) west of Kidderminster, 12 1/2 mi (20 km) north of Worcester and 23 mi (37 km) southwest of Birmingham. It lies on the River Severn, at the gateway of the Wyre Forest national nature reserve, and at the time of the 2021 census had a population of 9,267. Bewdley is a popular tourist destination and is known for the Bewdley Bridge, designed by Thomas Telford, and the well-preserved Georgian riverside.

== Town geography ==
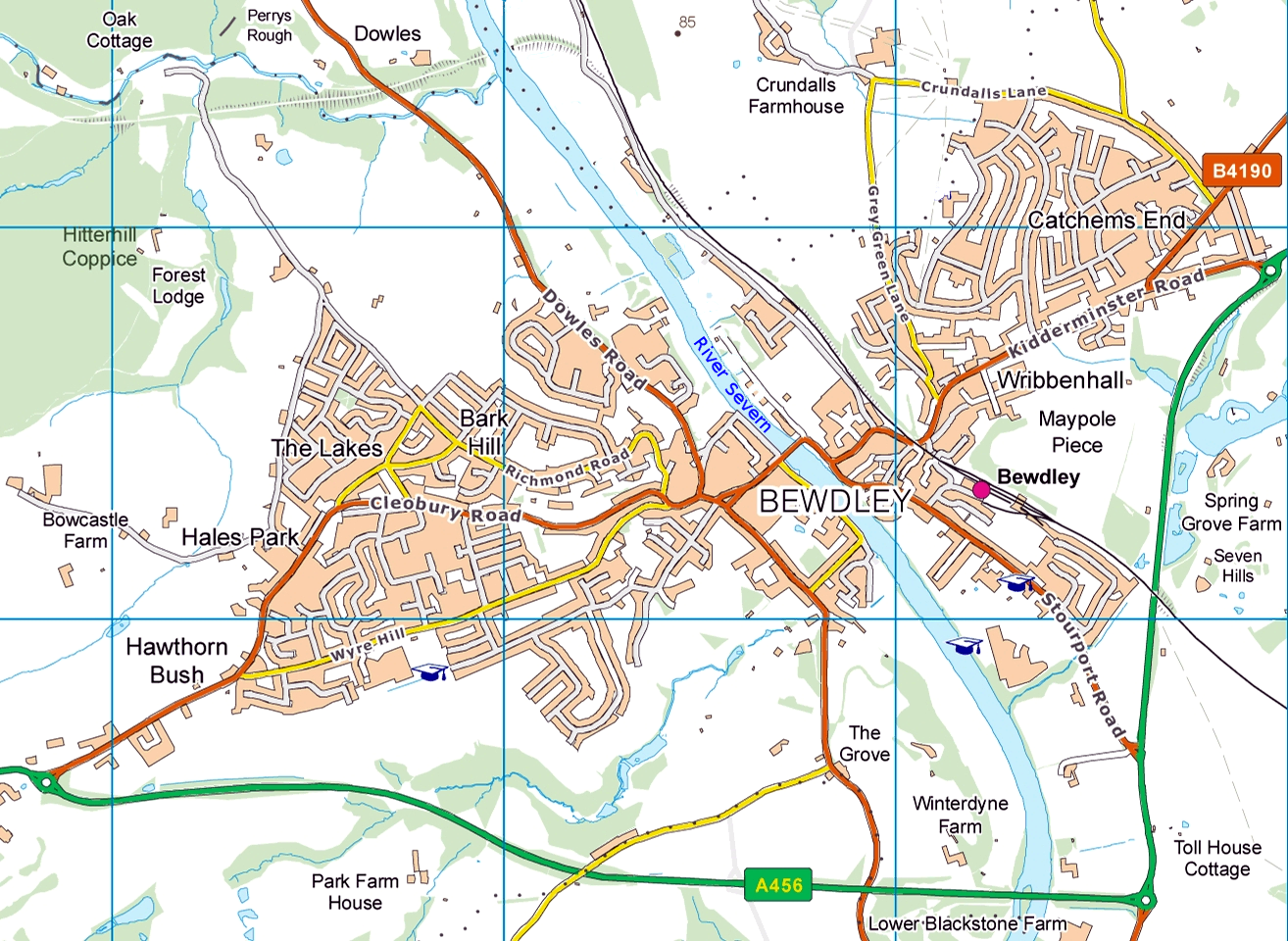
Bewdley and surrounding area (Ordnance Survey)

Bewdley is a town in Worcestershire, it is situated on the western bank of the River Severn. It lies within the Wyre Forest District, but close to the boundary of the Malvern Hills District, just 2 miles south of Bewdley.

The surrounding landscape includes notable hill ranges, the Malvern Hills lie 11 miles to the south, the Shropshire Hills 12 miles to the west, and the Cotswolds 21 miles to the south east.

Nearby towns include Stourport-on-Severn 2.5 miles to the south east, Kidderminster 3.5 miles to the East, and Worcester just 12.5 miles to the south.

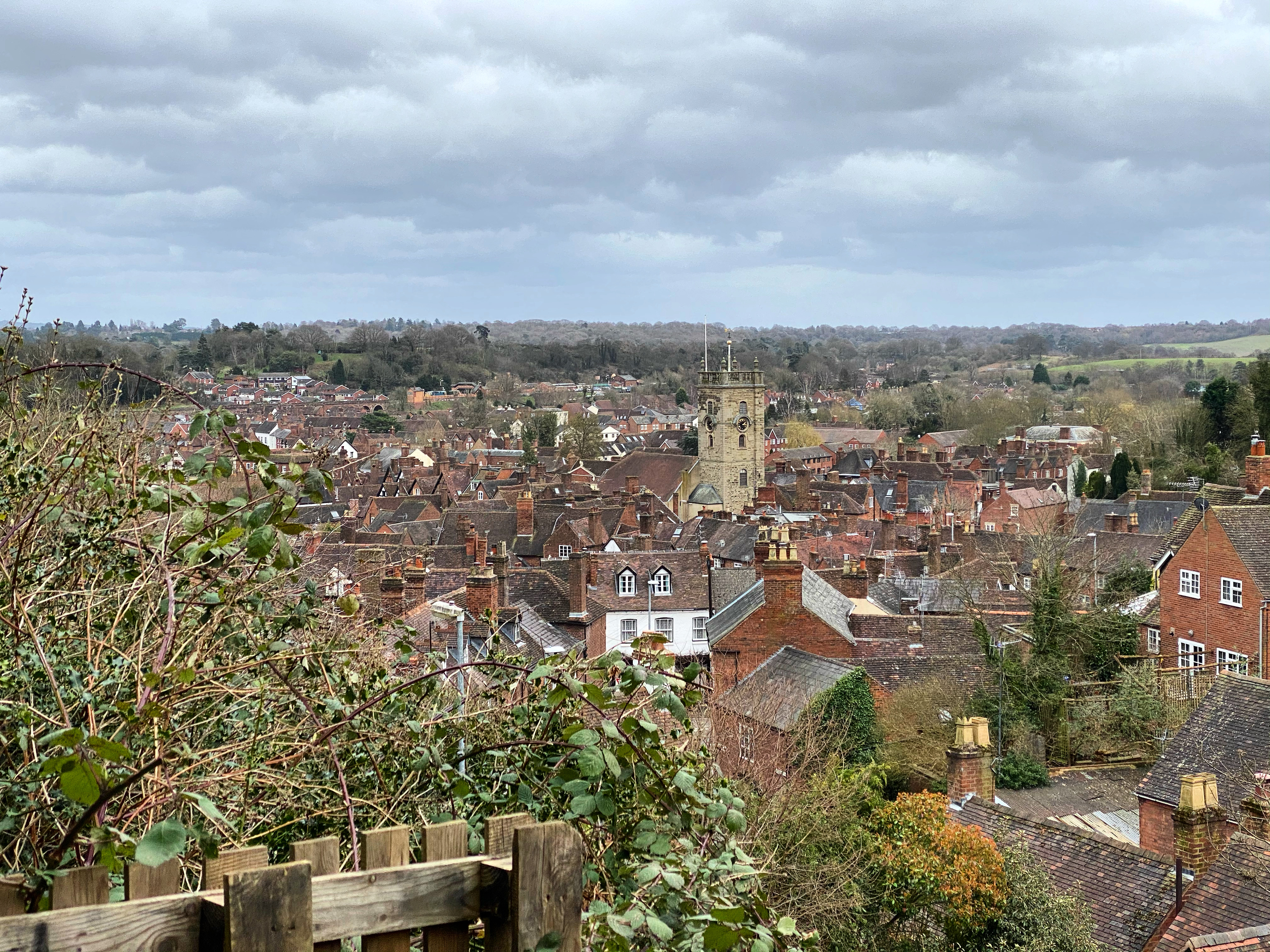
Bewdley from the racks, 2019

Beyond the church, High Street leads off to the south towards Stourport along the B4194, a road known locally as "the switchback" because of its many sharp curves. Unlike in many English towns, High Street is so called not because of its importance to commerce, but because of its geographical position 'high' above the river.

On the west side of the church, the B4190, named Welch Gate within town limits (so called because it once contained a tollgate on the road towards Wales), climbs steeply up to the west, giving access to the south side of the Wyre Forest. Dowles Road, a continuation of the B4194, leads northwest to Button Oak, along the east and northeast side of the Wyre Forest. To the northeast of the town is the wooded hilltop of Wassel Wood in Trimpley, the southern terminus of Shatterford Hill.

In the area between Stourport and Bewdley are several large country houses. Witley Court, Astley Hall, and Pool House are considered particularly significant.

== History ==
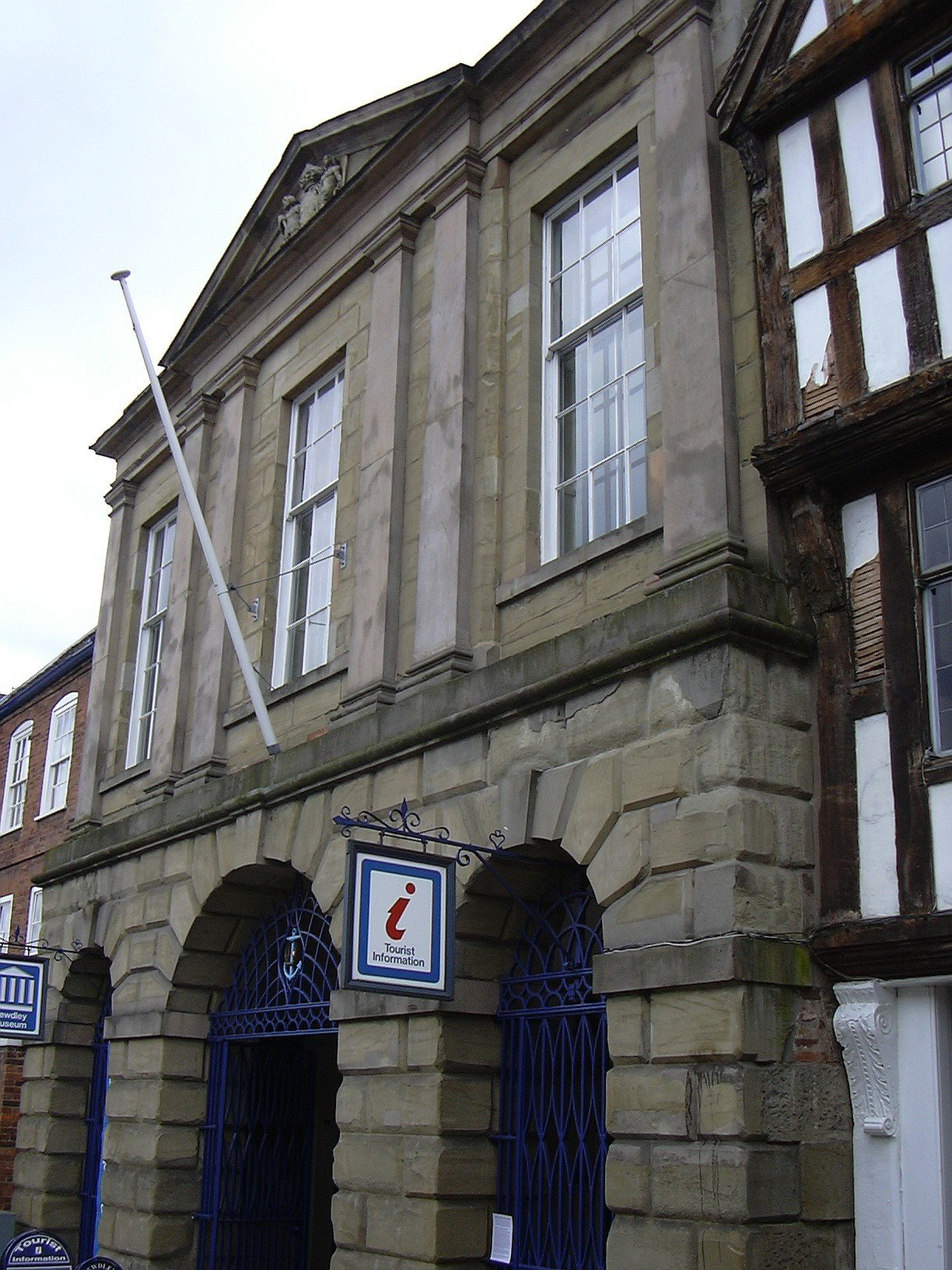
Bewdley Guildhall

Mesolithic-period settlers have been identified through excavations in Wribbenhall, which found 1,400 fragments of flint tools, as well as post holes, a hearth, gullies and a pit. This site has been dated to roughly 6,800 BC, making it the oldest settlement yet identified in Worcestershire. Pollen evidence shows that crops were already being grown and woodlands cleared at this time.

The main part of Bewdley town is situated on the western bank of the River Severn, including the main street—Load Street. Its name derives from lode, an old word for ferry. Load Street is notable for its width: it once also served as the town's market place.

Most of Bewdley's shops and amenities are situated along Load Street, at the top of which lies St Anne's Church, built between 1745 and 1748 by Doctor Thomas Woodward of Chipping Campden.

The settlement of Wribbenhall, on the eastern side of the Severn, and now part of Bewdley, was recorded in the Domesday Book as being part of the manor of Kidderminster. By the 14th century, the town had come to be known as Beau lieu, French for "Beautiful place". Two centuries later John Leland wrote in his Itinerary that "a man cannot wish to see a towne better".

Bewdley was granted borough status, as well as a weekly market, by King Edward IV in 1472. It retained this status until the local government reorganisation in 1974. A parliamentary report of 1777 listed Bewdley as having a parish workhouse accommodating up to 80 inmates.

Samuel Kenrick (1728–1811) moved to Bewdley in 1765 and lived there as a banker for the rest of his life. Throughout that time he wrote lengthy letters to his old Glasgow University friend, Rev. James Wodrow, minister in Stevenston, Ayrshire. Their correspondence contains many insights into life in late eighteenth-century Bewdley. For example, Kenrick described one of the annual visits to the town by the Methodist preacher, Rev. John Wesley, who "has a little flock in this town whom he statedly visits in his regular excursions …. Sometimes he comes accompanied with the noise & parade of half a score horsemen, preceding his chariot, who set our whole streets in a gaze …. His friends consist of serious well disposed people of all denominations, who go under the name of Methodists." (Samuel Kenrick to James Wodrow, 20 March 1786).

The borough had a population of 7,458 in 1841.

During the Second World War, Ribbesford House in Bewdley was used as the headquarters for the Free French officer cadets. The cadets consisted of 200 teenagers who undertook military training at Ribbesford House until they joined with other allied forces in the D Day invasion.

The former quayside on the western bank of the river has been much upgraded and landscaped over the last few decades. Its rows of Georgian townhouses and buildings are well seen from Telford's bridge. Since the completion of the flood defences in 2006 (see below), a "Civic Space" has been introduced to replace the old bandstand. It is used on a variety of occasions, including the twice monthly Bewdley Riverside Market.

== Governance ==
Bewdley is now governed by three tiers of local government, in increasing order of size: Bewdley town council, Wyre Forest district council, and Worcestershire county council.

For many centuries Bewdley had its own Member of Parliament (MP), most notably Stanley Baldwin, who served as the Conservative Prime Minister, who represented it from 1908 to 1937. Reflecting changes in population, in 1950 the Bewdley constituency was abolished, and the town was included in the Kidderminster constituency.

In 1983, the Kidderminster constituency (including Bewdley) was absorbed into the Wyre Forest constituency. The MP for Wyre Forest is Mark Garnier of the Conservative Party, who in 2010 unseated the incumbent, Richard Taylor of Independent Kidderminster Hospital and Health Concern (often simply Health Concern), a local organisation. The Labour Party held the seat from 1997 to 2001.

== River and bridges ==
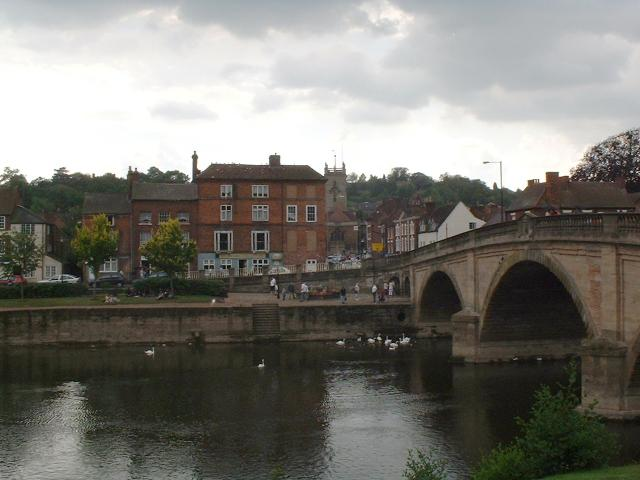
Bewdley Bridge and Severn Side South, 2003

The River Severn often used to flood in winter, damaging many houses and commercial premises in Bewdley. Among the worst floods in living memory were those in 1947, 1968 and 2000, where 140 properties were affected but after the 2000 floods, plans were made for flood defences on the western bank, completed in April 2006, costing £7 million. Temporary barriers are also put up to protect properties on the eastern side of the river in Wribbenhall (on Beales Corner). In October 2023 work began on permanent flood defences for Beales Corner on the eastern bank, scheduled for completion in Autumn 2025. These necessitated the introduction of a temporary one-way traffic system over the bridge, meaning Bewdley Bridge would only be traversable by road traffic from east to west for most of the duration of the flood works. Bewdley's long experience of dealing with flooding resulted in the National Flood Forum being held in the town in 2002.

Bewdley Bridge over the Severn was built in 1798 by Thomas Telford. It was erected to replace the 1483 medieval bridge that was swept away in the floods of 1795. A modern road bridge, opened to the southeast of the town at Blackstone in 1987 after many decades of campaigning, carries the Bewdley bypass across the river.

The Tenbury and Bewdley Railway branched off the Severn Valley Railway at Bewdley, and ran through the Wyre Forest to Tenbury Wells. It crossed the river at Dowles, over a bridge designed by William Clarke, a little to the north of Bewdley. This bridge was abandoned and dismantled in 1965, although its imposing brick and stone pillars remain. It was originally opened 100 years earlier, in August 1865.

== Education ==
Three state schools are located in Bewdley. Of these, two are primary schools: St Anne's CE Primary School on the west side of town and Bewdley Primary School in Wribbenhall on the eastern side of the Severn. Both were founded in 2007 when the region returned to a two-tier education system, replacing the former first and middle schools.

The single secondary school is The Bewdley School.

The Bewdley Grammar School on Lax Lane closed in the 1800s. Since then, the former grammar school has been adapted for many art galleries and art and craft activities. After the closure of Bewdley Grammar School, Bewdley High School & Sixth Form Centre was built on the opposite side of the river with new buildings. In 2007, Bewdley High School closed after 54 years due to an educational tier change that reorganised education as primary and secondary schools. All high schools were being replaced by new secondary schools.

In 2007, after new construction, landscaping, building refurbishments and extensions, The Bewdley School opened as a new secondary school. It provides facilities for the arts, science and outdoor learning to students. The Bewdley Sixth Form is also part of The Bewdley School, collectively offering GCSE and A Level courses.

In 2019, The Bewdley School won 'Secondary School of the Year' at the Worcestershire Educational Awards.

== Media ==
Local news and television programmes are provided by BBC West Midlands and ITV Central. Television signals are received from the Sutton Coldfield TV transmitter and the local relay transmitter situated in Kidderminster.

Local radio stations are BBC Hereford and Worcester, Heart West Midlands, Radio Wyvern, Capital Mid-Counties, Greatest Hits Radio Herefordshire & Worcestershire, Hits Radio Herefordshire & Worcestershire, Smooth West Midlands and, previously, The Wyre, a community based station.

The town is served by the local newspapers, The Shuttle., Kidderminster Standard and Express & Star.

== Local attractions ==
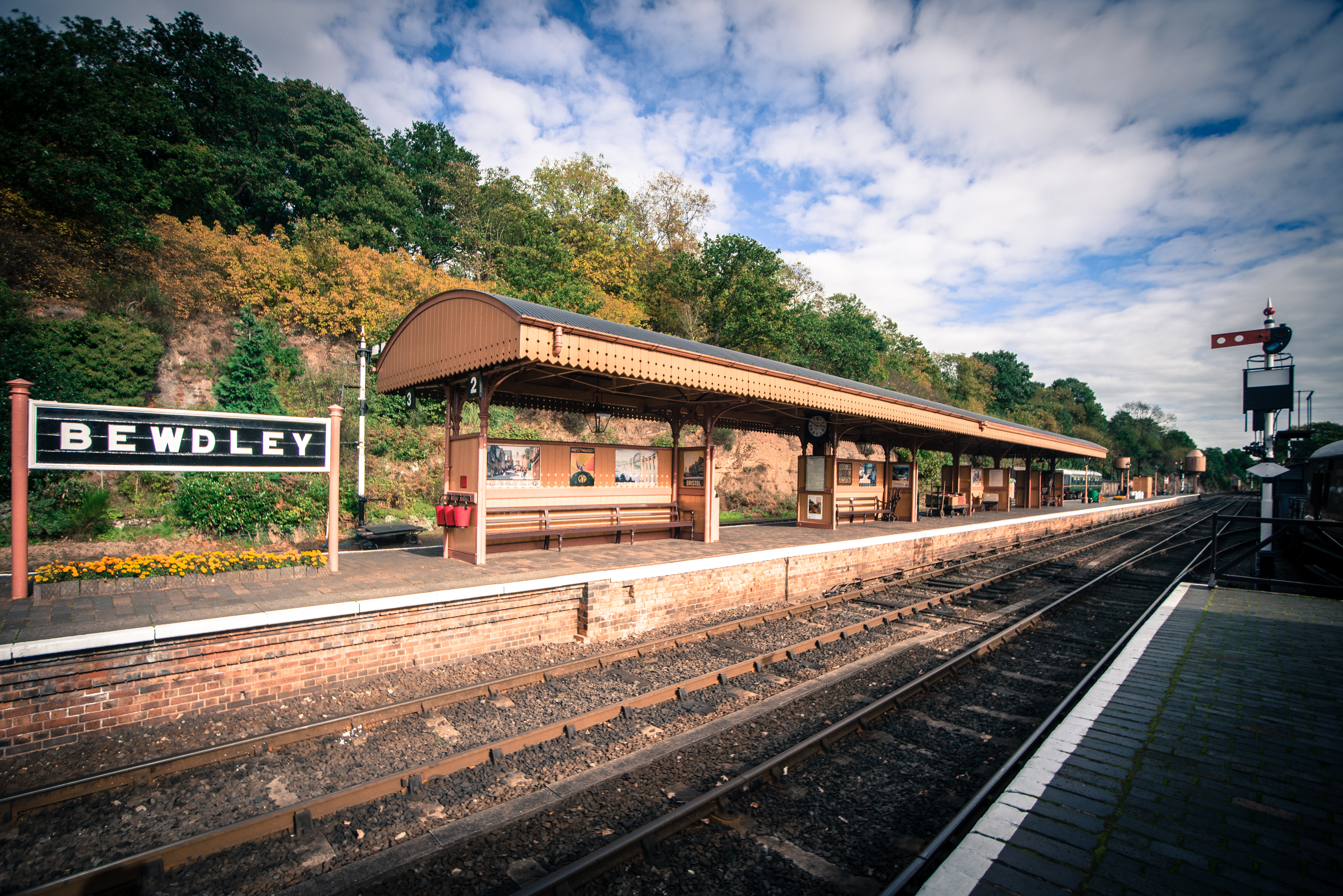
Bewdley Station, now restored as part of the Severn Valley Railway

=== Events ===
Bewdley also hosts one of the largest inland river regattas in the country. The Bewdley Beer Festival is held each August Bank Holiday weekend. Bewdley also has an annual carnival which takes place every June. The Bewdley Festival, featuring a variety of artistic performances, is held annually in the town each October.

=== Country music scene and festivals ===
Bewdley has a distinguished music scene. It is particularly well known for its intimate country music venues and its many local festivals including the One Earth Festival, Bewdley music festival, Arley festival, and Bewdley Live. Former Led Zeppelin lead, and now solo singer, Robert Plant lives in the nearby village of Upper Arley, and has been known to perform in the River Rooms; a small, intimate country music venue above the Cock and Magpie pub on the north riverside. The River Rooms attract country, soul, rock, jazz and pop performers from all across Europe and North America. Bewdley remains a significant centre for country music within the United Kingdom.

=== Other amenities ===
The West Midlands Safari Park is located nearby on the A456 towards Kidderminster.

Until the office moved in 2014 to Kidderminster, Bewdley contained the headquarters of the Severn Valley Railway. This heritage railway runs the 16 miles (26 kilometres) between Kidderminster and Bridgnorth. Bewdley remains the principal intermediate station on the line.

The Queen Elizabeth II Jubilee Gardens (usually abbreviated to simply "Jubilee Gardens") are located just off the High Street.

Bewdley is on the southeastern edge of the Wyre Forest, and there are many footpaths and cycle routes through the woodlands. A visitor centre is situated just outside Bewdley at Callow Hill on the road to Cleobury Mortimer, the head of many waymarked trails through the forest. Knowles Mill, a former corn mill owned by the National Trust is located within the forest.

The Bewdley Museum explores the history of the town and surrounding areas; it is located in the former butchers' shambles just behind Bewdley Guildhall.

Just outside Bewdley is Beaucastle, a Victorian mock-Gothic house, built in 1877. It was developed by George Baker, an industrialist and former Mayor of Birmingham and Bewdley. Beaucastle was designed by John Ruskin and William Doubleday.

== Notable residents ==
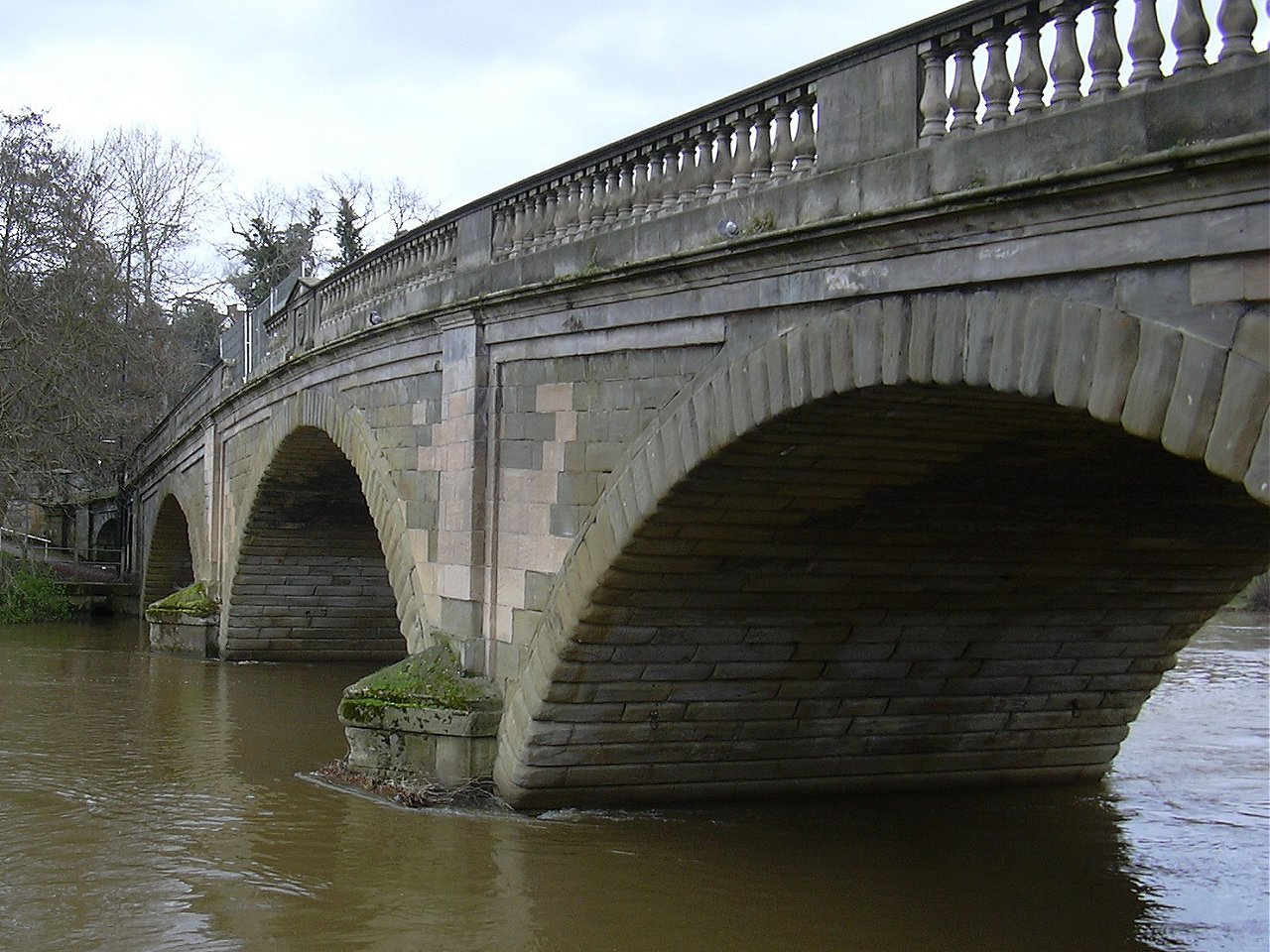
Bewdley Bridge

- Stanley Baldwin, who served as prime minister three times between 1923 and 1937, was born at Lower Park House, Lower Park, in 1867. He served as MP for the town from 1908 for nearly thirty years and, in 1937, became Earl Baldwin of Bewdley.
- Pamela Ball, surgeon and local resident.
- John Beddoe, ethnologist, was born in Bewdley in 1826.
- John Cawood (1775–1852), hymn writer and clergyman, curate of Ribbesford and Dowles from 1801, and incumbent of St Anne's Bewdley from 1814 until his death.
- Jannion Steele Elliott (1871–1942), ornithologist and naturalist, lived at Dowles Manor from 1903 until his death.
- Alun Evans, footballer, who in 1968 became the most expensive teenage transfer in history, moving from Wolverhampton Wanderers to Liverpool F.C., was born in Bewdley.
- Becky Hill, singer.
- Will Holland (Quantic), musician, DJ and record producer, is from Bewdley.
- Karl Hyde, musician, best known as a member of British techno/electronic music band Underworld was born in Bewdley.
- Brian Turner Tom Lawrence, awarded the Victoria Cross in the Boer War, was born in Bewdley.
- Rustie Lee, television chef and actress, has lived in the town and local area for 20 years.
- Alison Mardell, solicitor and senior Royal Air Force officer, was born here.
- Kayleigh Pearson, model, grew up in Bewdley, and attended Bewdley High School, now The Bewdley School.
- Robert Plant, former Led Zeppelin lead- and now solo singer, lives in the nearby village of Shatterford, and is a member of Bewdley Tennis and Rowing Club(s).
- Mary Whitehouse, media clean-up campaigner, founder of Mediawatch UK, lived at Bewdley in the late 1960s.
- Luke Woodhouse, professional darts player competing in Professional Darts Corporation (PDC) events.

== Twin towns ==
Bewdley is twinned with:

- Fort-Mahon-Plage, Somme, Hauts-de-France, France
- Vellmar, Hesse, Germany
