= Swinton =

Swinton may refer to:

== Places ==
=== England ===
- Swinton, Greater Manchester, a town
- Swinton, Harrogate, near Masham, North Yorkshire, a village
  - Swinton Estate, including Swinton Park
- Swinton, Ryedale, near Malton, North Yorkshire, a village and civil parish
- Swinton, South Yorkshire, a town
- Swinton Barracks, Perham Down, Wiltshire, a British Army installation

=== North America ===
- Swinton, Missouri, United States, an unincorporated community
- Swinton Creek Volcano, British Columbia, Canada

=== Scotland ===
- Swinton, Glasgow, a suburb of Glasgow
- Swinton, Scottish Borders, a village

== People ==
- Swinton (surname), a list of people
- Swinton (given name), a list of people
- Clan Swinton, a Scottish clan

== Schools ==
- Swinton Academy, Swinton, South Yorkshire, a mixed Academy and sixth form
- Swinton High School, Greater Manchester, which merged with two other schools to form Co-op Academy Swinton

== Sports ==
- Swinton Lions, a rugby league club based in Swinton, Greater Manchester
- Swinton Town F.C., a former football club based in Swinton, South Yorkshire
- Swinton Handicap Hurdle, a Grade 3 National Hunt hurdle race in Great Britain

== Other uses ==
- Swinton Insurance, a British insurance company
- Swinton railway station (disambiguation)
- Earl of Swinton, a British title

== See also ==
- Swindon (disambiguation)
