= Listed buildings in Swinton, South Yorkshire =

Swinton, is a town in the Metropolitan Borough of Rotherham, South Yorkshire, England. The town contains ten listed buildings that are recorded in the National Heritage List for England. Of these, one is listed at Grade II*, the middle of the three grades, and the others are at Grade II, the lowest grade. The listed buildings in the town and surrounding area consist of houses, a church and the remains of a chapel, a cross base, a milepost, a pottery kiln, and a former foundry.

== Key ==
Grade	Criteria
II*	Particularly important buildings of more than special interest
II	Buildings of national importance and special interest

== Buildings ==
Name and location	Photograph	Date	Notes	Grade
Remains of St Margaret's Chapel; 53.48929°N 1.31997°W	—	c. 1200	The remains of the former Norman chapel have been moved and incorporated into the churchyard wall to the north of St Margaret's Church. They are in sandstone with some limestone, and consist of parts of a richly decorated doorway with traces of zig-zag carving, and the chancel arch.	II
Cross base 53.48971°N 1.32184°W	—	Medieval	The base of a market cross that has been re-sited in the churchyard of St Margaret's Church. The base is in magnesian limestone, and the plinth and shaft are in sandstone. The base is square with chamfered corners, and the shaft is octagonal.	II
Swinton House; 53.48560°N 1.31847°W	—	c. 1756	A house later used for other purposes, it is in sandstone, partly rendered, on a plinth, with quoins, a band, a moulded cornice forming a gutter, and a Welsh slate roof with coped gables. There are two storeys, five bays, and a triple rear wing. The central doorway, now blocked, has an architrave with a tripartite keystone, and a broken pediment on consoles carved with acanthus. The windows are sashes, and the window above the doorway has an architrave, a cornice and a decorative apron.	II
15 Fitzwilliam Street; 53.48668°N 1.31859°W		Mid to late 18th century	A house and a shop in sandstone, with quoins, and a Welsh slate roof with square-cut gable copings and kneelers. There are two storeys, three bays, and a parallel rear range. In the ground floor is an inserted shop window, and to its right are a doorway, an inserted casement window, another doorway, and a sash window. The upper floor contains a central blind window flanked by casements.	II
Hawthorne Farmhouse; 53.48644°N 1.31859°W		1774	The farmhouse is in sandstone with quoins, a floor band, an eaves cornice, and a tile roof with coped gables and kneelers. There are two storeys and an attic, three bays, and a rear wing on the left. The central doorway has an architrave, a fanlight, and a tripartite keystone, and the windows are casements.	II
Swinton Hall; 53.48605°N 1.31815°W		c. 1800	A large house, later divided, it is in sandstone, partly rendered, on a plinth, with a tile roof, hipped on the left, and with coped gables. There are two and three storeys, a double depth plan, and a former entrance front of seven bays. The windows are casements. The right return has five bays, and in the ground floor is a loggia with four Doric columns on a raised pavement. In the upper floor the windows are divided by pilasters, and above them is a cornice and twin gables.	II
St Margaret's Church; 53.48912°N 1.32016°W		1815–17	The oldest part of the church is the tower, the rest being rebuilt in 1897–99. The church is built in sandstone with red tile roofs, and consists of a nave with a clerestory, north and south aisles, a chancel with a north vestry and a gabled south vestry, and a west tower. The tower has three stages, angle buttresses rising to pinnacles, a west doorway with a pointed head and hood moulds, string courses, a two-light west window, two-light bell openings with clock faces, and an embattled parapet with crocketed pinnacles. The windows along the aisles are paired lancets, and the east window has five stepped lights.	II
Rockingham Kiln; 53.48421°N 1.33751°W		Early 19th century (probable)	The kiln was part of the Rockingham Pottery, it is in red brick, partly rendered, and is about 17 metres (56 ft) high. It consists of a bottle-shaped oven housing a kiln, and at the top is a dentilled course under a capped apex. There are various openings, including doorways and windows, which are now blocked.	II*
Milepost; 53.47166°N 1.30874°W		19th century	The milepost is on the southwest side of Wentworth Road (B6090 road) opposite St Thomas' Church. It consists of a sandstone pillar with cast iron overlay, a triangular section, and a rounded top. On the top is inscribed "BRAMPTON BIERLOW & HOOTON ROBERTS ROAD" and "SWINTON", and on the sides are the distances to Barnsley, Wentworth, Doncaster, Conisbrough, and Hooton Roberts.	II
Former Queen's Foundry; 53.49128°N 1.30263°W		Late 19th century	Originally the offices and warehouse of a foundry and later used for other purposes, the building is in sandstone at the front, and brick at the rear, on a plinth, with quoins, a sill band, and a Welsh slate roof with coped gables and shaped kneelers. There are two storeys and 24 bays, with a gable over the middle three bays. In the centre is a segmental-arched wagon entrance with a quoined surround, impost blocks, and a keystone. Most of the windows are casements with round-arched heads, impost blocks and keystones. At the rear is an external staircase with an ornate cast iron balustrade.	II
