= Spence Broughton =

English highwayman (1746-1792)

- Born: c. 1746; Near Sleaford, Lincolnshire, England
- Died: April 14, 1792 (aged 45–46); Knavesmire, York, England
- Cause of death: Execution by hanging
- Occupation: Highwayman
- Known for: Robbery of the Sheffield and Rotherham mail
- Criminal charge: Mail robbery
- Criminal penalty: Death

Spence Broughton (c. 1746 – 14 April 1792) was an English highwayman who was executed for robbing the Rotherham Mail and was then gibbeted at the location of the robbery.

Born in Horbling near Falkingham, Lincolnshire, Broughton married and having three children. He developed a strong gambling habit which led to the loss of his family's finances and thus his wife's divorce. As such, he turned to robbery to earn enough money for his gambling habit. Alongside John Oxley and Thomas Shaw, Broughton robbed the Rotherham, Aylesbury and Cambridge mail for their bank bills, which were cashed in by Oxley.

The group were apprehended by police in October 1791, though Shaw turned King's Evidence and Oxley escaped from prison. Broughton faced a guilty verdict alone, and on 24 March 1792 was sentenced to death by hanging followed by gibbeting. He was hung in York on 14 April.

Broughton's body was taken 50 miles to be gibbeted in the morning of 16 April on Attercliffe Common, between Sheffield and Rotherham, where he had robbed the Rotherham Mail. 40,000 visitors attended the event, after which the gibbet remained hanging for 36 years. The gibbet gained notoriety and was subject to folklore, music and poetry, though was removed in 1827 or 1828 due to trespassing concerns. In 1867, the gibbet post was allegedly rediscovered, and what may be the remains of Broughton's gibbet cage were donated to Weston Park Museum in the 1930s. Broughton Lane and the Noose and Gibbet Inn are named after Broughton's gibbet.

== Biography ==
Spence Broughton was born in Horbling near Falkingham, Lincolnshire. Little is known of Broughton's early life, though he grew to become a tall man of a comfortable, honest and hardworking family and was well-to-do. The son of a farmer, he took up farming too; He married and had three children. However, one volume about his life described him as "a degenerated plant from a good tree"; he became involved with gambling as his most frequent pastime, destroying his family's financial prospects before leaving his wife and three children once Mrs Broughton secured her divorce from him. He left for the cockfighting scenes of Sheffield, Grantham and Derby, also enjoying races and games of chance such as EO tables (similar to roulette).

== Robberies ==
Broughton turned to theft to bring a cash supply to his gambling habits, working with John Oxley and Thomas Shaw to rob mail coaches. Oxley was known to have been able to exchange stolen bills for cash, Shaw could give information and funding, and Broughton led the thefts themselves.

=== Rotherham Mail (Attercliffe Common) ===
The robbery for which Broughton was tried took place on 29 January 1791, at Ickles, on the Rotherham edge of Attercliffe Common, located between Sheffield and Rotherham. The trio of Oxley, Shaw and Broughton worked together to rob the Rotherham Mail. Broughton and his accomplice Oxley stayed in Sheffield the night before the robbery and then walked out of the town on the Rotherham road. They initially met the mail coming towards Sheffield, though intended to rob it on its way back to Rotherham and so lay in wait for it to arrive.

George Leasley, the boy carrying the mail, was stopped by the two men about 1.5 miles (2.4 km) from Rotherham. Leasley later testified that he could not see their faces, and that they commanded him to leave the road before. leading him into a field, blindfolding him with a handkerchief, tying his hands behind his back, and fixing him to a hedge. After about an hour, Leasley freed himself and found his horse, but the Rotherham post bag was gone.

Broughton and Oxley escaped towards Mansfield. They found that the only item of value was a French bill of exchange worth £123, and disposed of the rest of the contents in a brook and parted, with Oxley proceeding to London to cash the bill. Oxley was able to exchange the £123 French bill using a French dictionary, and Oxley subsequently "decamped with all the proceeds except for £10". This prompted Broughton to pursue Oxley, eventually getting £40 from him.

=== Aylesbury Mail ===
The group committed a further robbery of the Aylesbury Mail on 28 May 1791, though this led to the group in fact losing money as they did not find anything valuable.

=== Cambridge Mail ===
The group robbed the Cambridge Mail in June 1791, the day following the Newmarket races. This was their most successful; the mail had plenty of bank bills which were being sent to gentleman gamblers in London for the races. In this latter robbery, the group used a similar tactic, removing the mail boy from the road, tying him to a post, burying the letters in a field close by, and taking almost £5,000 of bank bills. Oxley then cashed the bills, in several London locations, prior to the robbery becoming publicly known.

== Capture and imprisonment ==
An enquiry was made with the bankers concerning the Cambridge Mail bills, which revealed that bills had been stolen. This allowed the police to identify, chase and then apprehend Oxley in London. Oxley turned in Shaw in an attempt to claim that the bills belonged to him instead; at Shaw's lodgings, they instead found Broughton, taking him in after a chase. Shaw was taken in afterward, though all were arrested in October 1791 in London. Broughton was sent to Newgate Prison, and Oxley to Clerkenwell Prison. Broughton would spend 6 months in the prison.

Though it has since been alleged that Shaw was the instigator of the crimes, at trial Shaw turned King's Evidence, and said that Broughton was the ring-leader. Oxley alleged that Shaw did this because he and Broughton shared an interest in the same woman. Oxley himself escaped from Clerkenwell on 31 October, leaving Broughton to stand trial alone. The fate of John Oxley became the subject of speculation, with reports that he was smuggled out of Folkestone to America. However, the Sheffield newspapers reported in January 1793 that Oxley had been discovered dead of hunger and cold in a barn on Loxley Moor near Sheffield.

== Trial ==
Broughton was taken to York in January 1792. At the Lent assizes there, beginning 19 March that year, Broughton's trial took place on 24 March, taking 2.5 hours. Broughton was "indicted for feloniously assaulting George Leasley on the King's highway in the county of York, putting him in fear, and taking from his person the Rotherham Mail". Shaw testified that Broughton and Oxley had come to him after robbing the Rotherham mail to ask him where they could cash the £123 bill. Next to testify was John Close, who said that he had met Broughton in London looking for Oxley, and Broughton had complained to him that Oxley had not given him his share of the proceeds from the robbery. John Townsend, the arresting officer, described the events on the day of the arrest. Broughton's defence was that he stated that he was miles away when the crime occurred.

The jury found Broughton guilty. Judge Buller sentenced him to death by hanging, "and afterwards to be hung in chains on the Common, within three miles of Sheffield, where the robbery was committed." This post-execution gibbeting sentence was an attempt to warn against similar crime. The trial took only 90 minutes.

== Execution ==
In the days before his execution, Broughton is purported to have shown great remorse, writing:

Surely I have greatly transgressed the laws both of God and man! In what manner shall a sinful wretch, like me, presume to approach the throne of mercy? Alas! my repeated provocations do now wound me to the very soul.

Spence Broughton was executed on the gallows positioned outside York Castle, or at Knavesmire, York, on 14 April 1792. I At his execution he is reported to have professed his innocence, "saying that he was a murdered man; that, though he came down with the intent to rob the mail, he was six miles from the place at the time of the robbery", though he admitted receiving part of the proceeds.

== Gibbeting ==
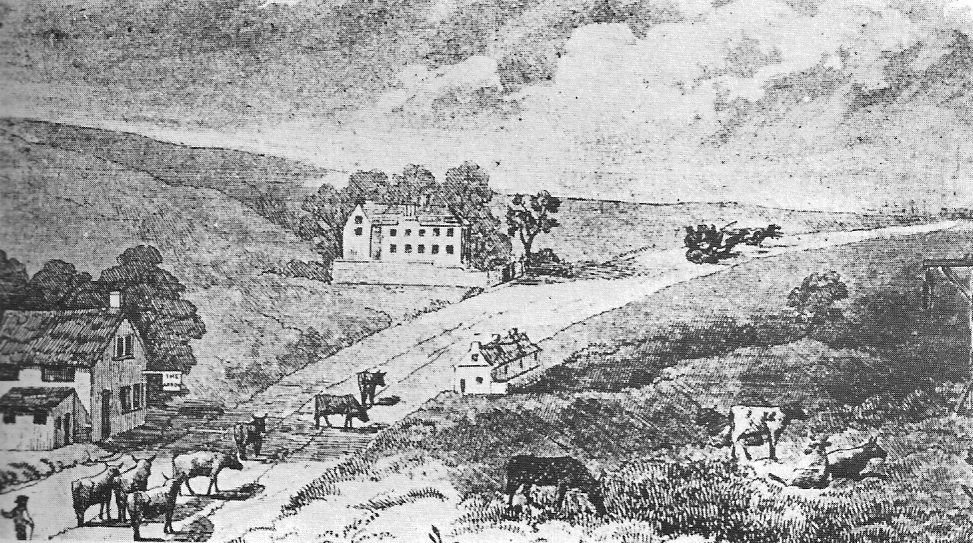
Drawing of Attercliffe Common c. 1792 showing Broughton's gibbet (right) and the Arrow pub (left).

Broughton is mainly remembered for the punishment dealt to his body after his death; by cart, his body was taken to Attercliffe Common to be hung in a gibbet. This was a journey of 50 miles. The gibbet post was about 200 yards (180 m) from the Arrow Inn. George Drabble, its keeper, reported that crowds started to gather on the common the day before. A few hours after the gibbet post's erection, though before Broughton's body was placed on the gibbet, hundreds of people were already there to watch.

In the early morning of Monday 16 April 1792, Drabble led the officials who were bringing the corpse to the gibbet site, and Broughton was suspended on the gibbet. For the chains and gibbet, the smith and carpenter were paid £9 15s 2d, which was a large amount of money, though the full cost of the gibbeting was £39 15s 2d and the total execution cost came to £71 10s 2d. Broughton was not the last man gibbeted in England, though some have incorrectly stated this.

The gibbet is reported to have attracted 40,000 visitors to the Common on its first day alone, and Drabble said he made a fortune from this, noting that at 8 pm on Sunday 17 April, "the common was like a fair".

On the first Sunday after he was gibbeted, all the road through Attercliffe was one mass of people, going to and from the gibbet. Many remarked they never saw so many people in their lives, and wondered where they came from, for it beat Sheffield fair, and seemed as if they never would give over coming.

Drabble would see customers coming to the inn when visiting the gibbet for months after the fact. Broughton's body would remain hanging in the gibbet on Attercliffe Common for over 36 years.

19 years after Broughton was placed in the gibbet, it was noted that the irons, a skull, and some bones and rags were still present on the gibbet. In 1819, the Sheffield Iris reported that after a robbery near Attercliffe, the "daring offender must have passed through the field in which is the gibbet of the notorious Spence Broughton". 36 years later, the gibbet was mostly empty, though was still attracting visitors.

=== Removal ===
The gibbet was finally removed in 1827 or 1828, when Henry Sorby, who had bought the land it stood on, had it cut down because he had grown tired of trespassers on his land. His son made note of this.

The remains of the gibbet post were rediscovered in 1867 when a solid oak post was found embedded in a framework in the ground during excavations for the cellars of some new houses in Clifton Street, Attercliffe Common, "opposite the Red Lion". The discovery once again drew large crowds of hundreds to Attercliffe Common. The Times described the post as such;

It is solid old oak, perfectly black and quite sound, though embedded in the ground since 1792. It consists of a massive framework, 10ft. long and 1ft. deep, firmly embedded in the ground to support the Gibbet-post, which passed through its centre and was bolted to it. Some 4ft. 6in. of this post is left, the remainder of the post is 18in square.

The present location of the post, which was dug up, is no longer known.

In the 1930s, a private individual donated a group of objects to Weston Park Museum which they claimed were the remains of Broughton's gibbet chains, and the museum's catalogue continues to tentatively identify them as such. These remains consist of an iron belt with four chain ends and a hinged latch, as well as a length of chain, featuring what appears to be cuffs at its ends. They also have larger rings too big to be manacles or ankle chains. However, these objects are different to other surviving gibbet cages, and may instead be part of a horse's draught collar and hame chain, or prisoners' leg irons.

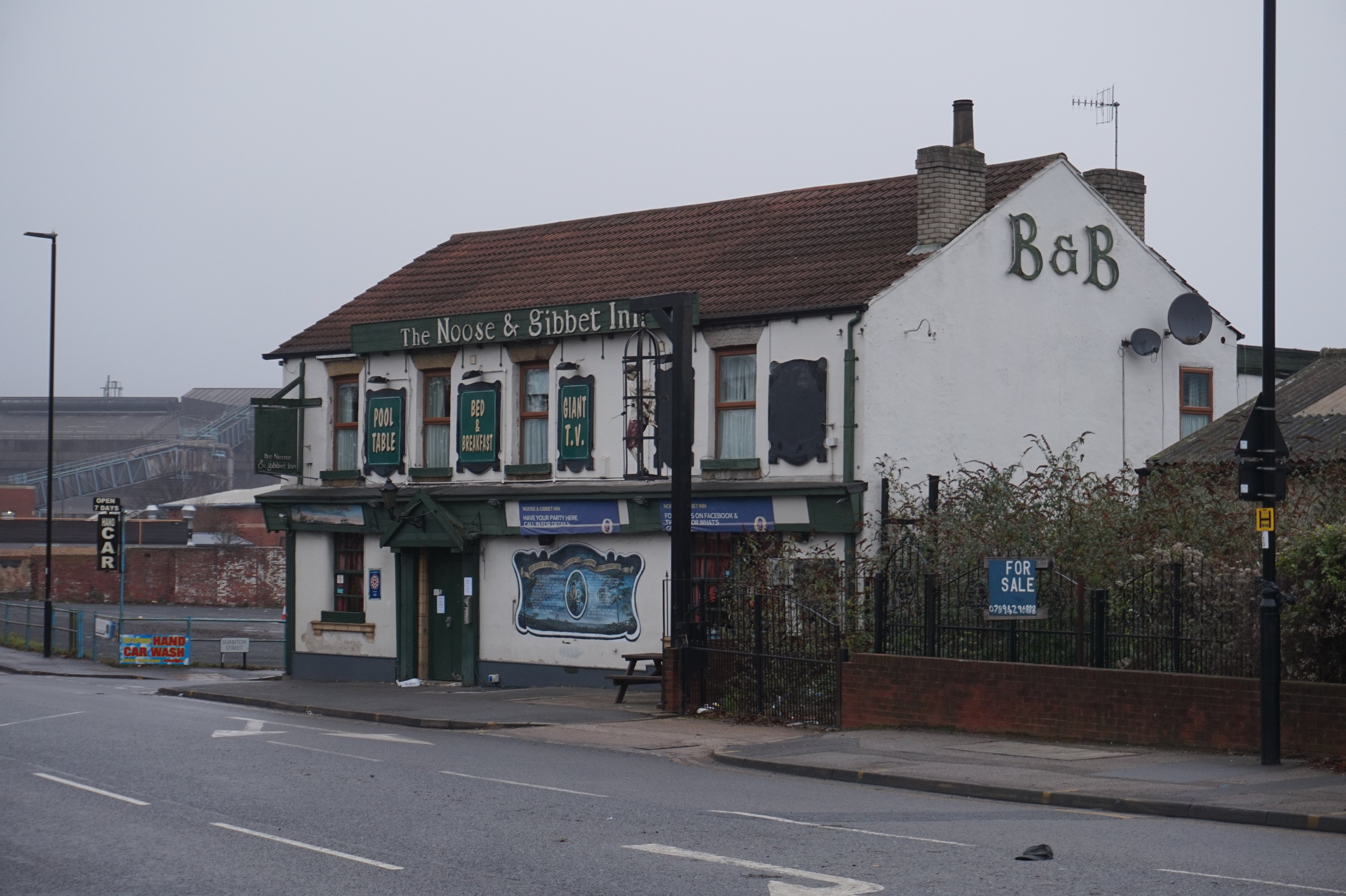
The Noose and Gibbet inn on Broughton Lane, named after Broughton's gibbet and featuring an inaccurate representation of a gibbet, in 2019

The road where the gibbet was located is now named Broughton Lane. Presently, there exists the Noose and Gibbet Inn on Broughton Lane. This is decorated with a pretend gibbet cage in which a figure of a living man has been placed, though the cage is not accurate in its depiction, better resembling a bird cage. The pub is also decorated with wanted posters. The inn falsely claims that Broughton was the last man gibbeted in England.

=== Folklore ===
One story of the gibbet in local folklore was that a group of drunken potters from the Don Pottery, passing the site of the gibbet, threw stones at the skeleton and managed to dislodge two fingers. Taking these as trophies they were calcined and incorporated into the body of a jug. Songs were also written about Broughton including Spence Broughton reported by C. J. Davison Ingledew, and Spence Broughton's Lament by Joseph Mather:

Hark, his blood, in strains so piercing,
Cries for justice night and day;
In these words which I'm rehersing,
Now methinks I hear him say—
"Thou, who art my spirit's portion
In the realms of endless bliss,
When at first thou gav'st me motion
Knew that I should come to this.

By 1900, folkloric tales stated that Broughton wrote to his estranged wife the day prior to his execution, and that she sat alone in the window od the Arrow Inn, watching his body on the gibbet with "tear-dimmed eyes".

== Sources ==
- Tarlow, Sarah (1 December 2014). "The Technology of the Gibbet". International Journal of Historical Archaeology. 18 (4): 668–699. doi:10.1007/s10761-014-0275-0. ISSN 1092-7697. PMC 4372825. PMID 25834380.
- Tarlow, Sarah (2017). The Golden and Ghoulish Age of the Gibbet in Britain. London: Palgrave Macmillan UK. doi:10.1057/978-1-137-60089-9. ISBN 978-1-137-60088-2.
- Tarlow, Sarah; Lowman, Emma Battell (2018). Harnessing the Power of the Criminal Corpse. Cham: Springer International Publishing. doi:10.1007/978-3-319-77908-9. ISBN 978-3-319-77907-2.
