= Boult =

Boult may refer to:

- Boult (surname)
- Boult, Haute-Saône, a commune in the French region of Franche-Comté

== See also ==
- Boult-aux-Bois, a commune in the French region of Champagne-Ardenne
- Boult-sur-Suippe, a commune in the French region of Champagne-Ardenne
- Bolt (disambiguation)
