= Don Pottery =

Coordinates: 53°29′21.34″N 1°17′57.46″W

The Don Pottery was a 19th-century manufacturer of earthenware, whose factory was located in the town of Swinton in South Yorkshire, England, on the River Don. It is not to be confused with the Swinton Pottery.

== History of the pottery ==
The pottery was established in 1790 by John Green of the Leeds Pottery. Don pottery produced cream-coloured earthenware in the same style as Leeds pottery, as well as some white earthenware with blue or blank transfer printing and some marbled ware.

The production of porcelain at the factory began in 1810. Potteries in the West Riding of Yorkshire had been increasing in number throughout the 18th century but English experimentation with porcelain had been concentrated in the south and Midlands until this point, although a number of potteries in the vicinity of the Don Pottery began making porcelain shortly afterwards, including the world-famous Rockingham Pottery.

Don pottery porcelain which was produced between 1810 and 1830 was of a very high quality and was exported worldwide.

Whilst the pottery was initially very successful, financial problems arose in the 1830s and the Greens were forced to sell the pottery in 1834, when it was purchased by Barker and Sons, who owned the nearby Mexborough Pottery.

The factory was closed in 1893 as a result of further financial problems.
