= Swinton (given name) =

Swinton is a masculine given name borne by:

- Swinton Boult (1809–1876), secretary and director of the Liverpool, London, and Globe Insurance Company
- Swinton Colthurst Holland (1844–1922), British Royal Navy admiral
- Swinton O. Scott III, American animator, storyboard artist, screenwriter, producer and director
- Swinton Thomas (1931–2016), British judge, privy councillor and Interception of Communications Commissioner
