= Boult (surname) =

Boult is a surname. Notable people with the surname include:

- Adrian Boult (1889–1983), English conductor
- Frances L. Boult (1856–1905), English activist, cookery instructor, and magazine editor
- Swinton Boult (1809–1876), English businessman
- Trent Boult (born 1989), New Zealand cricketer

== See also ==
- Bolt (surname)
