= Swindon (disambiguation) =

Swindon is a large town in Wiltshire, United Kingdom.

Swindon may also refer to:

Swindon, Wiltshire

- Borough of Swindon, unitary authority covering the Swindon area
- Swindon (UK Parliament constituency)
- Swindon railway station, a major railway junction
- Swindon Town F.C., the town's football team
- Swindon Works, the former railway locomotive works.

elsewhere

- Swindon Village, Gloucestershire, England
- Swindon, Staffordshire, England
- Swindon, Ontario, Canada, now known as Perry

== See also ==
- Swinden, a village in North Yorkshire, England
- Swinton (disambiguation)
