= Rockingham Kiln =

19th century kiln in Swinton, South Yorkshire, England

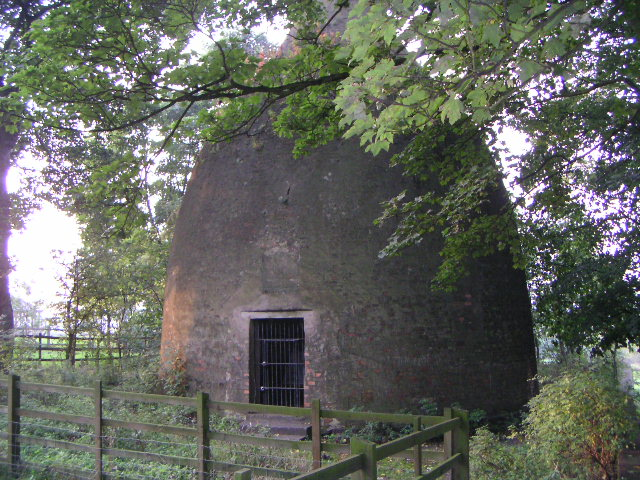

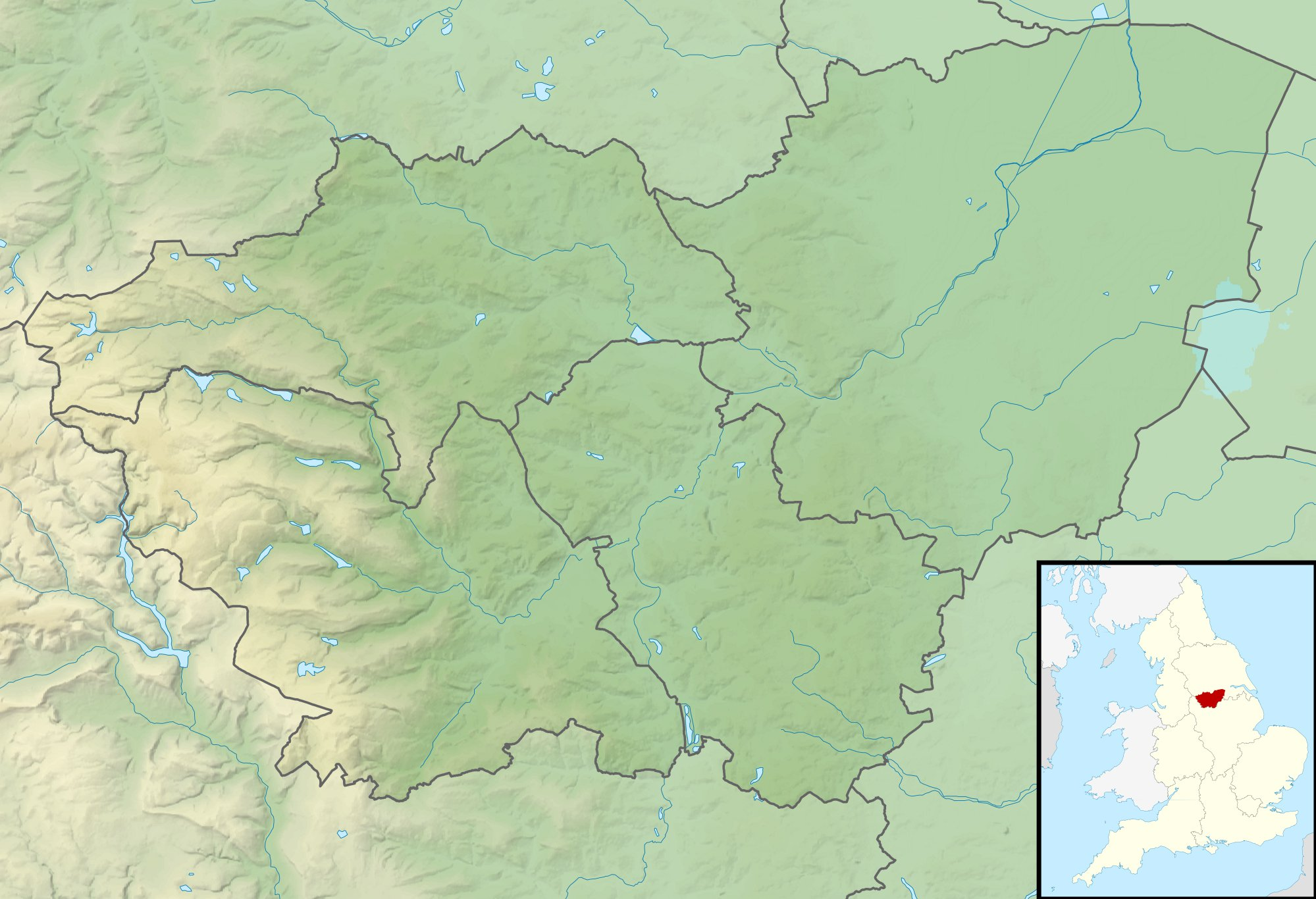
- Location within South Yorkshire
- 53.4842°N 1.3376°W
- Type: Kiln
- Location: Swinton, South Yorkshire

History
- Built: 1815

Site notes
- Architectural style: Industrial
- Governing body: Rotherham Museums

Listed Building – Grade II*
- Official name: Rockingham Kiln
- Designated: 11 December 1953
- Reference no.: 1314614

Scheduled monument
- Official name: Swinton Pottery (The Rockingham Works)
- Designated: 10 January 2000
- Reference no.: 1020067

The Rockingham, or Waterloo Kiln in Swinton, in the Rotherham district, in South Yorkshire, England, is a pottery kiln dating from 1815. It formed part of the production centre for the Rockingham Pottery which, in the early 19th century, produced highly-decorative Rococo porcelain. The pottery failed in the mid-19th century, and the kiln is one of the few remaining elements of the Rockingham manufactory. It is a Grade II* listed building and forms part of the Rockingham Works Scheduled monument. The kiln was previously on the Historic England Heritage at Risk Register.

== History ==
The original factory on the Swinton site produced simple earthenware pottery. The first recorded operator was a Joseph Flint, who in the 1740s was renting the site from the Marquess of Rockingham. A partnership with the Leeds Pottery failed and was dissolved by 1806. The subsequent owners, the Brameld family, built the Rockingham Kiln, and other structures on the site, in 1815. The date, the year of the Battle of Waterloo, led to the kiln's alternative name, the Waterloo Kiln. Despite the Brameld's investigations into the production of high-quality porcelain, the venture continued to be unsuccessful and the firm was extricated from a further bankruptcy in 1826 only by the intervention of William Fitzwilliam, 4th Earl Fitzwilliam, who had inherited the Wentworth Woodhouse estate from his uncle, the second Marquess of Rockingham.

The Earl's patronage, permitting the use of the Rockingham name and family crest, together with providing direct financial support, saw the Rockingham Pottery develop into a major producer of elaborate rococo-style porcelain, which enjoyed royal endorsement at home and considerable sales abroad. The factory produced major pieces including a full desert service for William IV which took eight years to complete. (Note: Perhaps the Rockingham Pottery's most famous piece was the Rhinoceros Vase; at its completion, the largest single piece of porcelain ever made. Two were created, of which one is now in the Victoria and Albert Museum and the other is held by the local Clifton Park Museum.) (Note: The V&A notes that the Rhinoceros Vase was greatly admired by contemporaries, despite what its modern conservators consider “its bizarre combination of ill-matched elements.”) Ruth Harman, in her 2017 revised volume, Yorkshire West Riding: Sheffield and the South, of the Pevsner Buildings of England series, notes that "perfection was their undoing" and by 1842 the Rockingham firm was again bankrupt and the site was closed.

The Pottery Ponds site is administered by Rotherham Museums. The kiln was on Historic England's Heritage at Risk Register from 2022 (Note: The Heritage at Risk Register entry describes the condition of the kiln as “fair” and notes that a plan for restoration and conservation has been agreed with the local authority.) until it was taken off in November 2025. Recent interest in the Rockingham Works has seen the erection of a commemorative sculpture in Swinton in 2003, and a community heritage project at the site in 2021, directed by the artist Carlos Cortes.

== Architecture and description ==
The Rockingham Kiln is believed to be the only surviving such pottery kiln in Yorkshire, and one of the few remaining in England. The 17 metres (56 ft) high kiln is bottle-shaped and is constructed in English Bond red brick. Harman records that the structure is more accurately described as a "bottle-shaped brick oven [containing] a kiln". The kiln is a Grade II* listed building and forms part of the Rockingham Works Scheduled monument.

== Sources ==
- Harman, Ruth; Pevsner, Nikolaus (2017). Yorkshire West Riding: Sheffield and the South. The Buildings of England. New Haven, US and London: Yale University Press. ISBN 978-0-300-22468-9.
