= Swinton, South Yorkshire =

Town in South Yorkshire, England

Coordinates: 53.4877°N 1.3149°W

Swinton
- Town
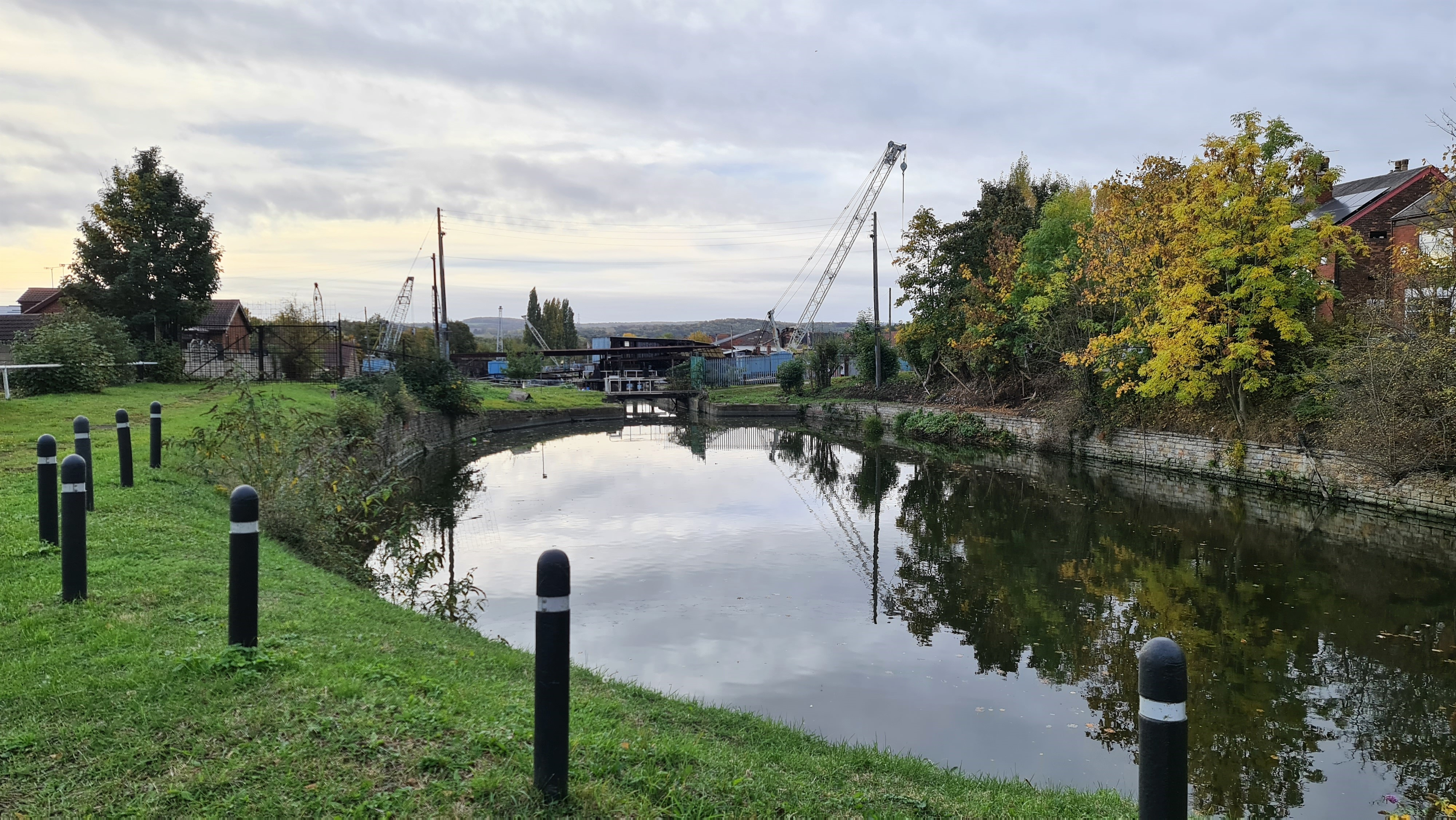
- Swinton Locks

- Location within South Yorkshire
- Population: 15,559 (2011 census)
- OS grid reference: SK454992
  - London: 145 mi (233 km) SSE
- Metropolitan borough: Rotherham
- Metropolitan county: South Yorkshire
- Region: Yorkshire and the Humber
- Country: England
- Sovereign state: United Kingdom
- Post town: Mexborough
- Postcode district: S64
- Dialling code: 01709
- Police: South Yorkshire
- Fire: South Yorkshire
- Ambulance: Yorkshire
- UK Parliament: Rawmarsh and Conisbrough

Swinton is a town in the Metropolitan Borough of Rotherham, in South Yorkshire, England on the west bank of the River Don. It has a population of 15,559 (2011). The town is five miles north-northeast of the larger town of Rotherham and south-west of Mexborough. The original junior and infant school building built in 1852 on Church Street (formerly Fitzwilliam School) still exists, and is being converted into residential apartments called Fitzwilliam Lodge.

== History ==
The name Swinton derives from the Old English swīntūn meaning 'pig farm'.

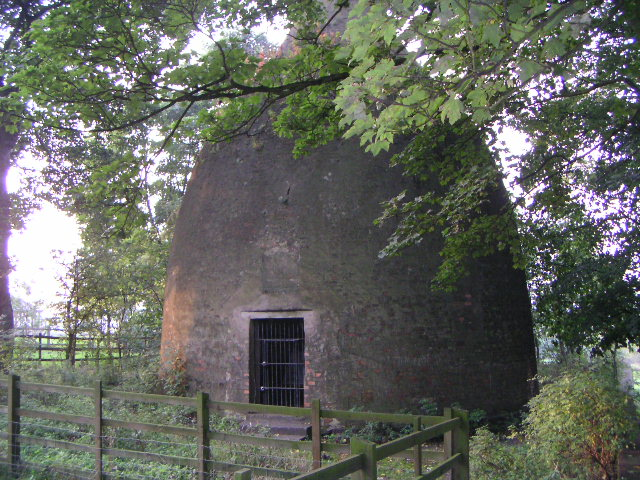
Rockingham Kiln

The town was once a centre for the manufacture of pottery of international importance, and deep coal mining, glassmaking, canal barge-building and engineering.

It is known for the Rockingham Pottery, a world-renowned manufacturer of porcelain. Although the factory closed in 1842, its name defines a style of rococo porcelain. There were several other potteries in the area during the 19th century. One of the original kilns, the Rockingham, or Waterloo, Kiln, a small part of the factory, a gatehouse (both now private residences) and the pottery flint millpond remain today in Pottery Ponds, a small park off Blackamoor Road near the Woodman public house. Swinton was also the site of the important but lesser known Don Pottery.

The village lies between the Roman Ridge (extending approximately from Wincobank to the north east of Sheffield, to Mexborough) and the south west Roman road from Doncaster (the Roman fort and minor settlement of Danum). A coin hoard dating to the early 3rd century was excavated during the construction of a house cellar in the village in 1853.

In June 2014, Andrew Allen uncovered a number of pottery sherds whilst gardening at home. Preliminary observations found that it comprised approximately 90 pottery sherds, including high status Samian ware, traditional cooking wares and rusticated pottery, as well as possible metal and glass working waste products.

In October 2014, South Yorkshire's first crowd-funded archaeological project commenced with an archaeological excavation in the area of the pottery finds. It found evidence of a Roman ditch and a possible Roman field system and numerous pieces of pottery from the late 1st to mid 3rd centuries. Further archaeological excavation was undertaken in spring 2015 and a comprehensive geophysical survey of Swinton Fitzwilliam school playing fields. Further work is planned with Elmet Archaeology and the local community.

== Topography ==
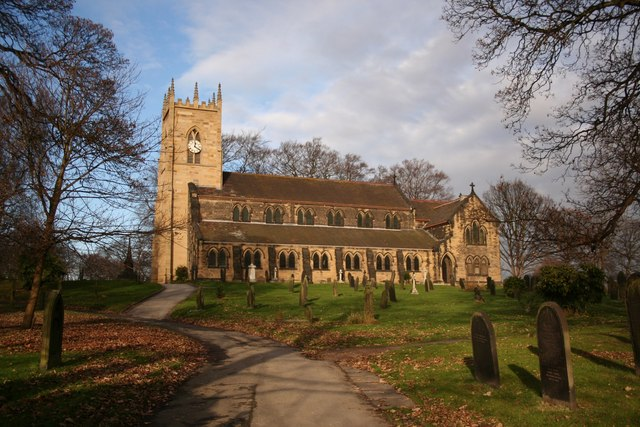
St Margaret's Church (Church of England)

The town is situated on a hillside. The higher areas generally contain older dwellings, and the lower, newer build properties. The lowest part of the town contains two main rail lines, the River Don, the Sheffield and South Yorkshire Navigation canal and the derelict Dearne and Dove Canal.

== Economy and transport ==
Following the decline of traditional industries and after the 1980s miners' strike, employment is provided predominantly by service and light industry in the Manvers area. Surviving in the area of railway lines and canals is a boat yard with a limited barge repair and transport business, and timber milling and woodworking facilities.

The Sheffield and South Yorkshire Navigation canal, once a major transport route between Sheffield and Goole, underwent substantial modernisation in the mid-1980s and is capable of accommodating large vessels as far as Rotherham, and pleasure craft through to Sheffield. Limited bulk freight has returned to the canal with use of the modern Swinton Lock.

The town was without a railway station between January 1968, when the old station was closed as part of the Beeching cuts, and 1991, when a new station was opened after the restoration of the double track "Swinton Curve" (also known as the "Foundry Curve"), enabling trains to travel from Sheffield to Doncaster. Increased passenger usage led to the provision of a portable building staffed for morning peak times only. It was replaced by a brick building housing a ticket office and waiting room. Some local bus services connect with trains at this facility.

== Education ==
Swinton's secondary school, with sixth form college, is Swinton Academy. It teaches pupils from age 11 to 18. The school was scheduled to be rebuilt on the current site but the scrapping of the rebuilding schools programme by the coalition government of the time meant that the school will not have a new building.

There are also several primary schools and nurseries, including Swinton Fitzwilliam Primary, Swinton Queen Primary School and Brookfield Primary School. Swinton Queen Primary School was rebuilt and opened in March 2011 with the old school buildings being demolished.

On the outskirts of Swinton are Dearne Valley College and the empty Humphry Davy House which was used for nursing studies by Sheffield University.

== Amenities ==
Swinton has 14 public houses commonly called "The Swinton Mile", which range from typical Yorkshire pubs serving food, modern bars, and a working men's club.

== Local issues ==
Industrial premises on Swinton's boundary with Kilnhurst were occupied by Croda Hydrocarbons, who took over the works from Midland and Yorkshire Tar Distillers. The site is controversial owing to pollution during the plant operations. Despite this planning permission was granted to build domestic dwellings. A Validation Certificate has been issued and work by Gleeson Homes started.

== Notable people ==
- Frederick William Hulme (1816–1884), landscape artist.
- Charles Green (baptised 26 December 1734 – 29 January 1771), astronomer.

== See also ==
- Listed buildings in Swinton, South Yorkshire
