= Swinton railway station =

Swinton railway station may refer to:

- Swinton railway station (Greater Manchester), in the Metropolitan Borough of Salford
- Swinton railway station (South Yorkshire), which opened in 1991 in Swinton, in the Metropolitan Borough of Rotherham
- Swinton Town railway station, an earlier station north of the present station in Swinton, South Yorkshire, closed in 1968

== See also ==
- Swindon railway station, Wiltshire
