= Rockingham Pottery =

19th-century Yorkshire manufacturer of porcelain

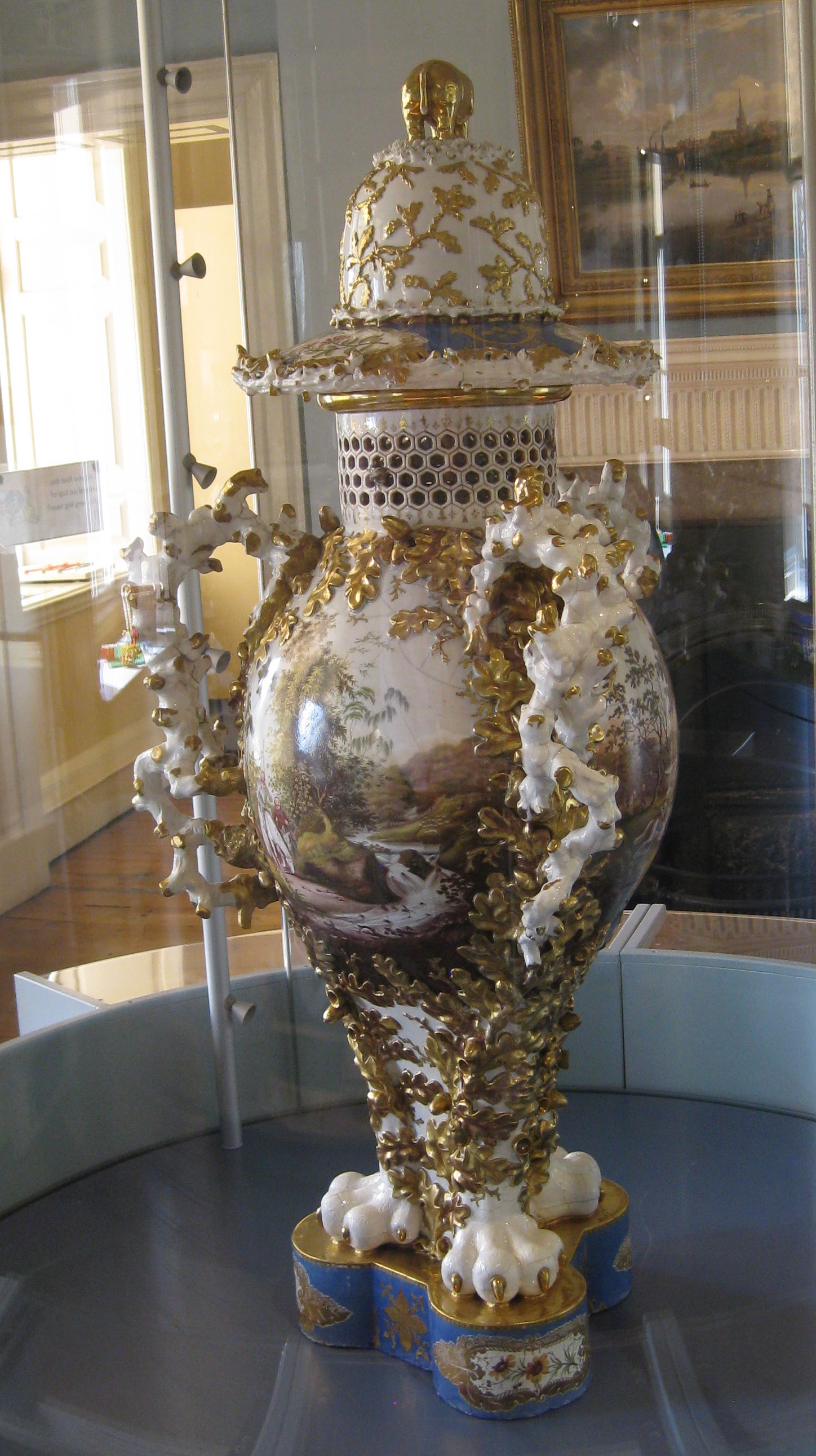
The Rhinoceros Vase (1826) demonstrating the capabilities of the pottery

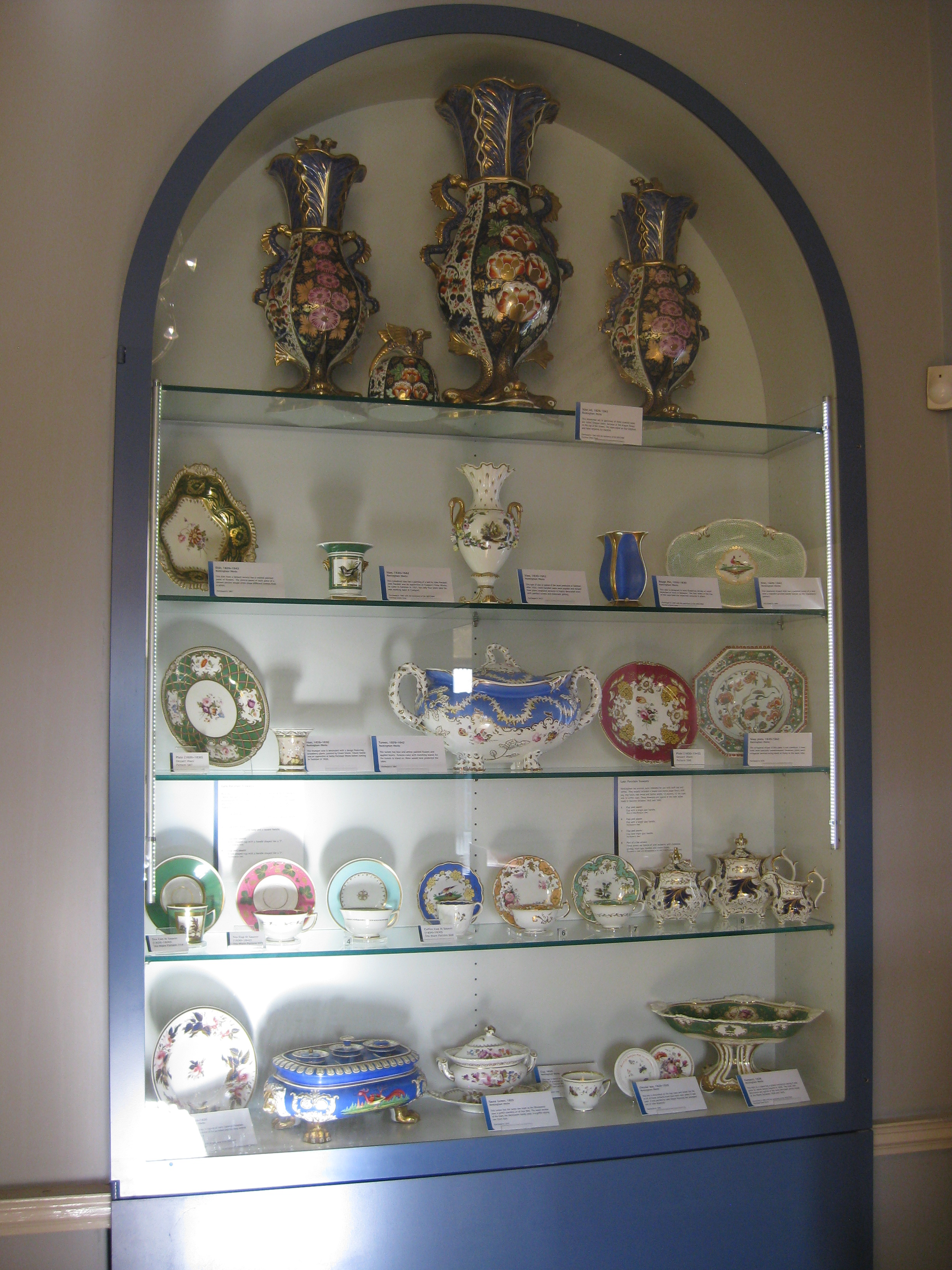
Rockingham Pottery Display at the Clifton Park Museum

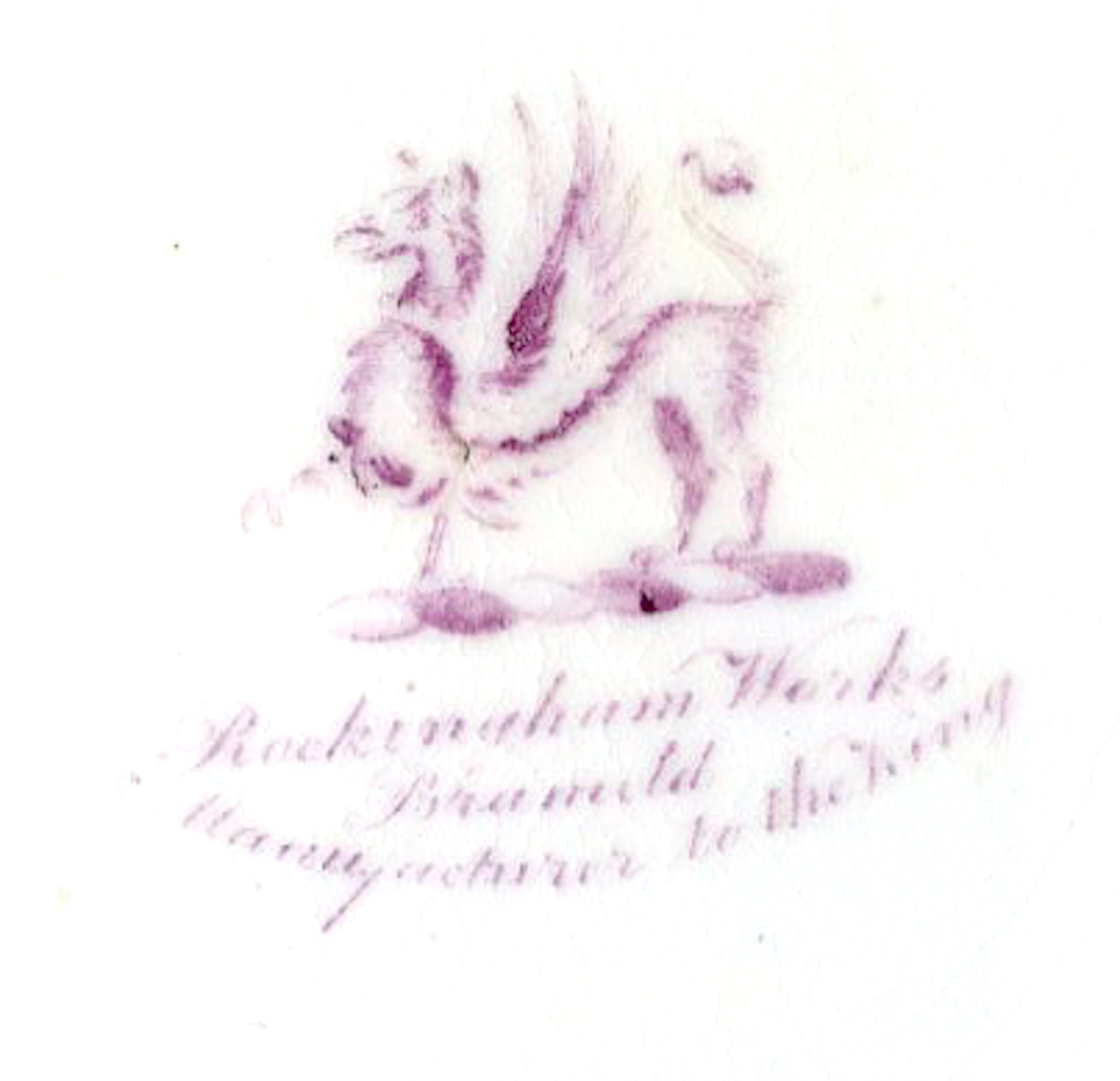
Identification mark reading: "Rockingham Works, Brameld, Manufacturer to the King"

The Rockingham Pottery was a 19th-century manufacturer of porcelain of international repute, supplying fine wares and ornamental pieces to royalty and the aristocracy in Britain and overseas, as well as manufacturing porcelain and earthenware items for ordinary use.

It is best known for its finely decorated and, to modern tastes, somewhat gaudy rococo style of porcelain; indeed its name has almost come to classify such a style and as such pieces by other factories are regularly and incorrectly attributed to Rockingham. A famous piece is the 1 cwt (50 kg) ornate item known as the Rhinoceros Vase (of which two are known) made to demonstrate the skill of producing such a large and complex item as a single piece of fired porcelain.

The factory was located in Swinton, near Rotherham, West Riding of Yorkshire, England, and for the later part of its lifetime existed under the patronage of the Earls Fitzwilliam, indirect descendants of the Marquesses of Rockingham, who were the major landowners in the area, and whose stately home and extensive park was located several miles away in Wentworth.

What is often called "Rockingham-glazed" pottery or "Rockingham ware" was widely produced in Britain and the United States in the 19th century, earthenware with a thick brown ceramic glaze, in a style associated with the earlier 18th-century production.

== History of the pottery ==
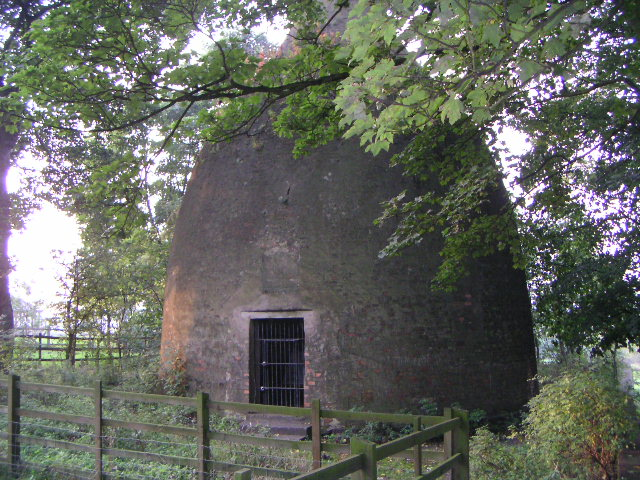
Former Rockingham Kiln

Records show that a potworks making utilitarian earthenware for the local market existed on the site in 1745. In 1778 it passed to new owners, who enlarged the works and began to produce better classes of wares. It was linked between 1787 and 1806 with the Leeds Pottery, until full ownership passed into the hands of the local Brameld family in 1807. After this time the Pottery was barely profitable and continued through considerable assistance from the Earl. Experiments with the manufacture of porcelain began in 1820. By 1826 the pottery was bankrupt. However the Bramelds' experiments with porcelain had just come to fruition and the Earl was impressed by the potential of the new products. He bailed out the pottery and allowed his family's crest and name to be used by the pottery. Production of fine porcelain services and ornamental wares commenced rapidly, which through the connections of the Earl brought the factory to the attention of the aristocracy. Orders from royalty lead to use of the sub-title "Manufacturer to the King" from 1831.

The pinnacle of the factory's output was the two intricately decorated "Rhinoceros" vases which were advertised by the works as being the largest single-piece porcelain objects in existence (one of which is in the Victoria and Albert Museum and the other of which is in the Clifton Park Museum in Rotherham) and a large exquisite dessert service commissioned for King William IV, which took eight years to complete, was eventually delivered to his successor Queen Victoria and can be seen at Windsor Castle.

Unfortunately the Brameld family were more ceramic artists than businessmen: even though they were bailed out by the Earl they were regularly short of capital and struggled to make a profit. At this time it was relatively common for large but cash-strapped companies to pay their employees in IOU notes which would circulate in local economy as a form of cash: the Bramelds frequently resorted to issuing these. The Earl felt it was his duty as the local landowner to bail out the pottery to prevent the economic hardship that the collapse of the pottery would cause on his estate. Eventually in the face of mounting debts, and with a new less interested Earl in residence at Wentworth, no further financial support was extended and the bankrupt pottery closed in 1842.

One of the original kilns, the Rockingham or Waterloo kiln, a small part of the factory, a gatehouse (both now private residences) and the pottery flint mill pond remain in a small park today as remnants of this once-great factory.

== Rockingham pottery and porcelain ==
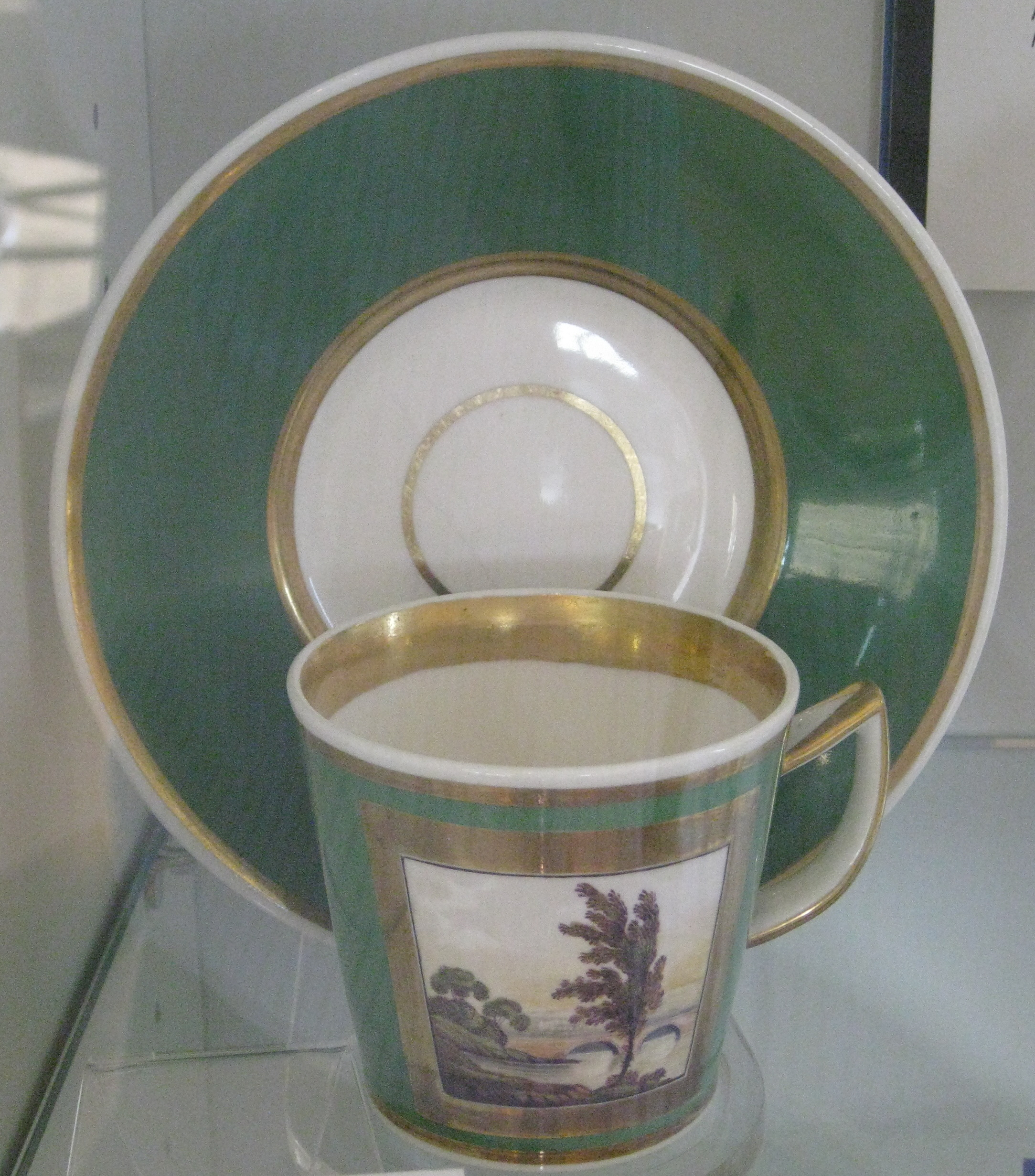
Red-mark period tea cup and saucer

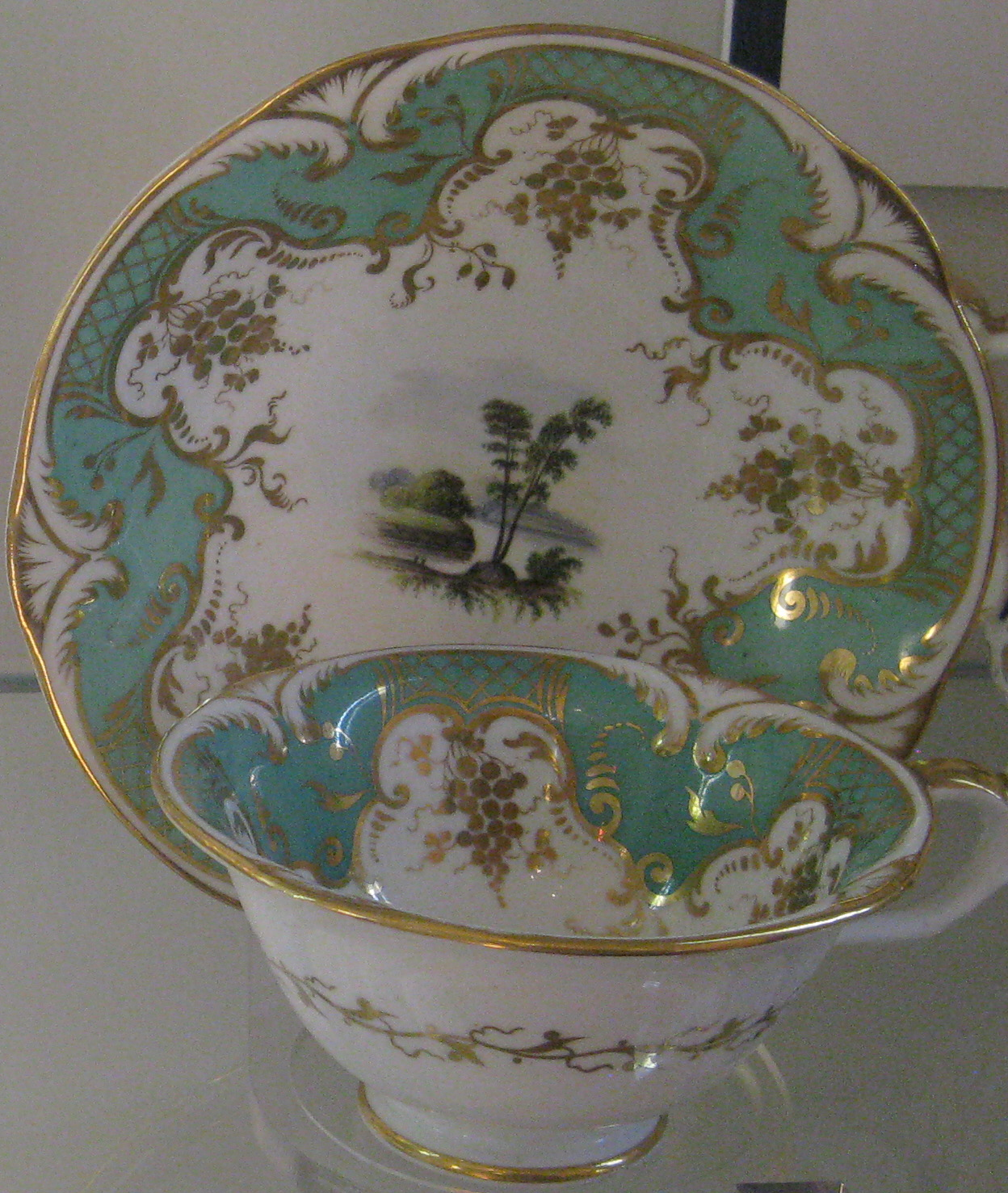
Puce-mark period cup and saucer

Rockingham porcelain was produced in two distinct periods: 1826–1830, the so-called red-mark period, and 1831–1842, the puce-mark period. As their names suggest, these periods are defined by the backstamps found on porcelain.

Porcelain products included tea and coffee services, dinner and dessert services, writing sets and ink pots, scent jars and pots, baskets, bed posts, porcelain plaques, figurines, animals, cabinet plates and cups. Patterns varied from regular geometric designs featuring brightly coloured reserves and simple gilding, through intricate neo-rococo designs of scrolls and acanthus leaves, to ornate encrusted decorative wares. Many of the more decorative pieces feature landscapes, floral and botanical specimens. Royal and aristocratic commissions often feature the family's arms. There is some evidence to show that the most decorative pieces were produced towards the end of the red-mark period and the early puce-mark periods: earlier pieces often feature the more geometric shapes, while later pieces, though retaining the neo-rococo shapes of the early puce-mark period, feature less extravagant decoration that was possibly more fitting of the first years of the Victorian age.

Amongst its other products, the factory was also famous for producing a deep brown, almost iridescent brown-glazed earthenware. In these wares, it was most famous for producing an ingenious style of pot that is filled from a hole in the bottom via a vacuum lock, known as a Cadogan. Examples of these in many sizes are often found, sometimes featuring gilding. The Brown Betty is an example of this kind of earthenware.

Amongst its more standard products were blue and green transfer-printed creamware and pearlware services and other items featuring a variety of scenes: the "Returning Woodman" or "Peasant" (often on octagonal plates) is possibly the most recognisable of these.

== Identifying original Rockingham ==
=== Earthenware ===
Rockingham-produced earthenware is often transfer printed, but occasionally enamelled pieces may be found. Brown-glazed 'Cadogan' pots are also common. Many pieces are backstamped with an embossed "Brameld" mark. Other pieces can be identified by matching with known backstamped designs. Brown-glazed earthenware marked with an embossed "Rockingham" mark is often not genuine Rockingham but the output of other contemporary factories seeking to impersonate popular Rockingham wares.

=== Porcelain ===
On Rockingham porcelain the most common marks are a red griffin with the words "Rockingham Works Brameld" and a puce griffin with the words "Rockingham Works Brameld Manufacturer to the King". Other variations are occasionally found. Pattern numbers are present on services; numbers outside the range 400–1800 are not known on original Rockingham, although there was a subsidiary 2/1 to 2/100 series that is genuine. Due to the frequency with which other manufacturers' wares are mistakenly attributed to this factory, and since pieces were frequently backstamped (in particular the saucers of tea services), the shapes of unmarked pieces must be matched with known Rockingham shapes to associate unmarked wares with this pottery with any confidence.

== Other Rockingham ==
=== Baguley ===
After the closure of the works in 1842, some of the craftsmen remained on site to continue manufacturing on their own. The most successful of these was the Baguley family, the most senior of whom Isaac Baguley had been a painter of porcelain who rose to be the manager of the painting and gilding department at the factory. Baguley decorated porcelain that was bought in as unglazed biscuitware from other potteries. The classic brown Rockingham glaze was used, the rights to which Baguley had acquired after the closure of the pottery, with much use of gilding and occasional enamelling. Isaac Baguley died in 1855 and his son Alfred continued the business, moving from the Rockingham works to nearby Mexborough in 1865, where he continued decorating bought-in porcelain until his death in 1891.

Immediately after the closure of the works, Baguley used an identical backstamp to the Rockingham puce mark. This changed into a similar mark titled "Rockingham Works Baguley". However, later the mark changed to an unrelated device with "Rockingham Works Mexborough" (or "Mexboro") as the subtitle, except on works produced for the Fitzwilliam household which retained the griffin mark. Use of these marks together with the brown glaze and gilding on non-Rockingham shapes makes Baguley pieces easy to identify. They are interesting and valuable in their own right.

=== Bennington and other American ware ===
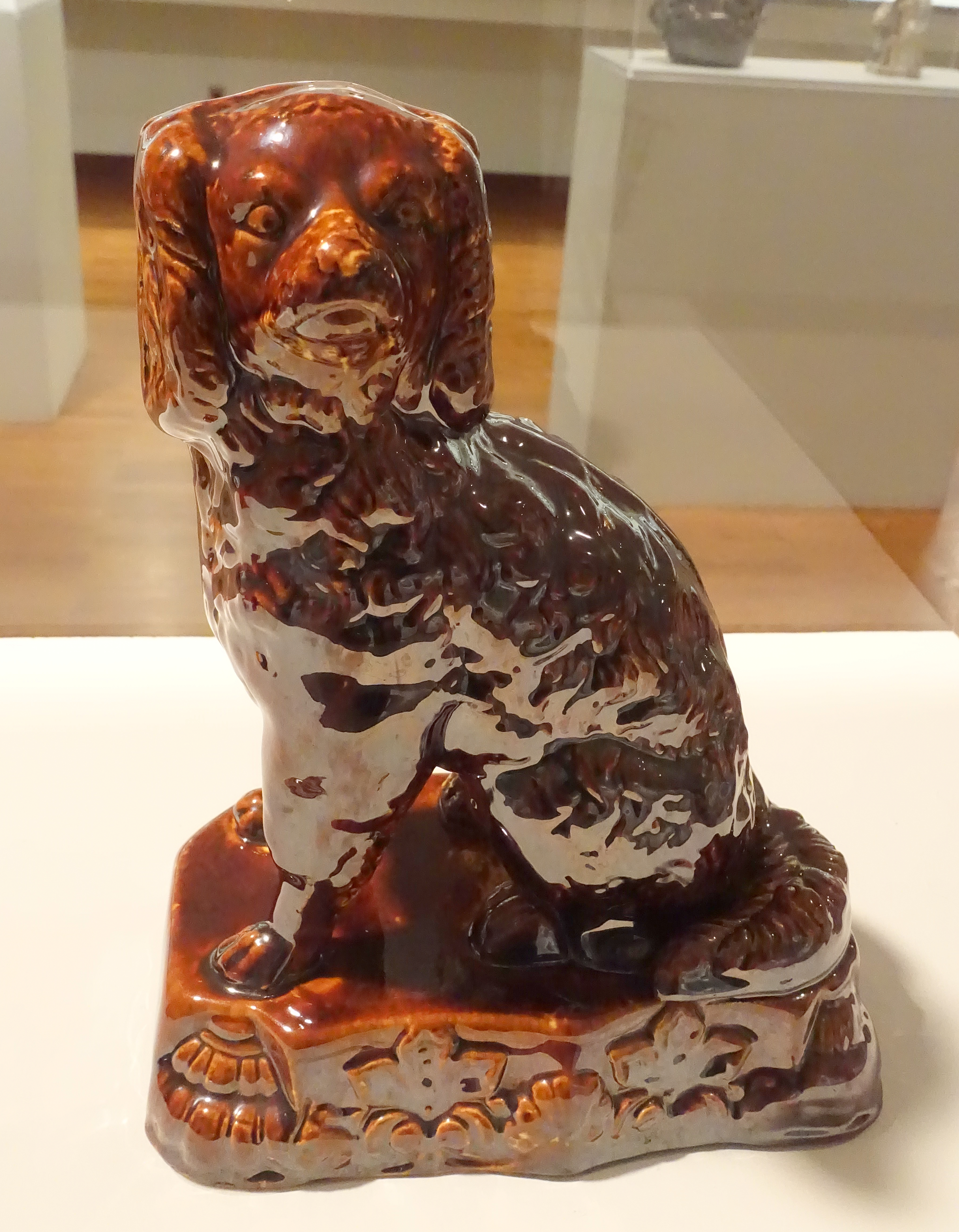
American stoneware spaniel figurine, "Rockingham Pottery", Bennington, Vermont, 1850-1900

The famous brown earthenware glaze discovered by the Rockingham pottery was imitated by many potteries and made its way across the Atlantic to be used on many decorative and utilitarian pieces from a variety of U.S. potteries, the most famous of which was at Bennington, Vermont. The name "Rockingham" is often used in the U.S. to describe the rather substantial brown-glazed earthenware output of these factories: Americans may be more familiar with its use in this context. Jabez Vodrey and his family are notable for having made Rockingham-style ware in East Liverpool, Ohio in the mid-19th century, while Edwin Bennett was also producing it in Baltimore. Many examples of this type of Rockingham pottery may be found in the East Liverpool Museum of Ceramics.

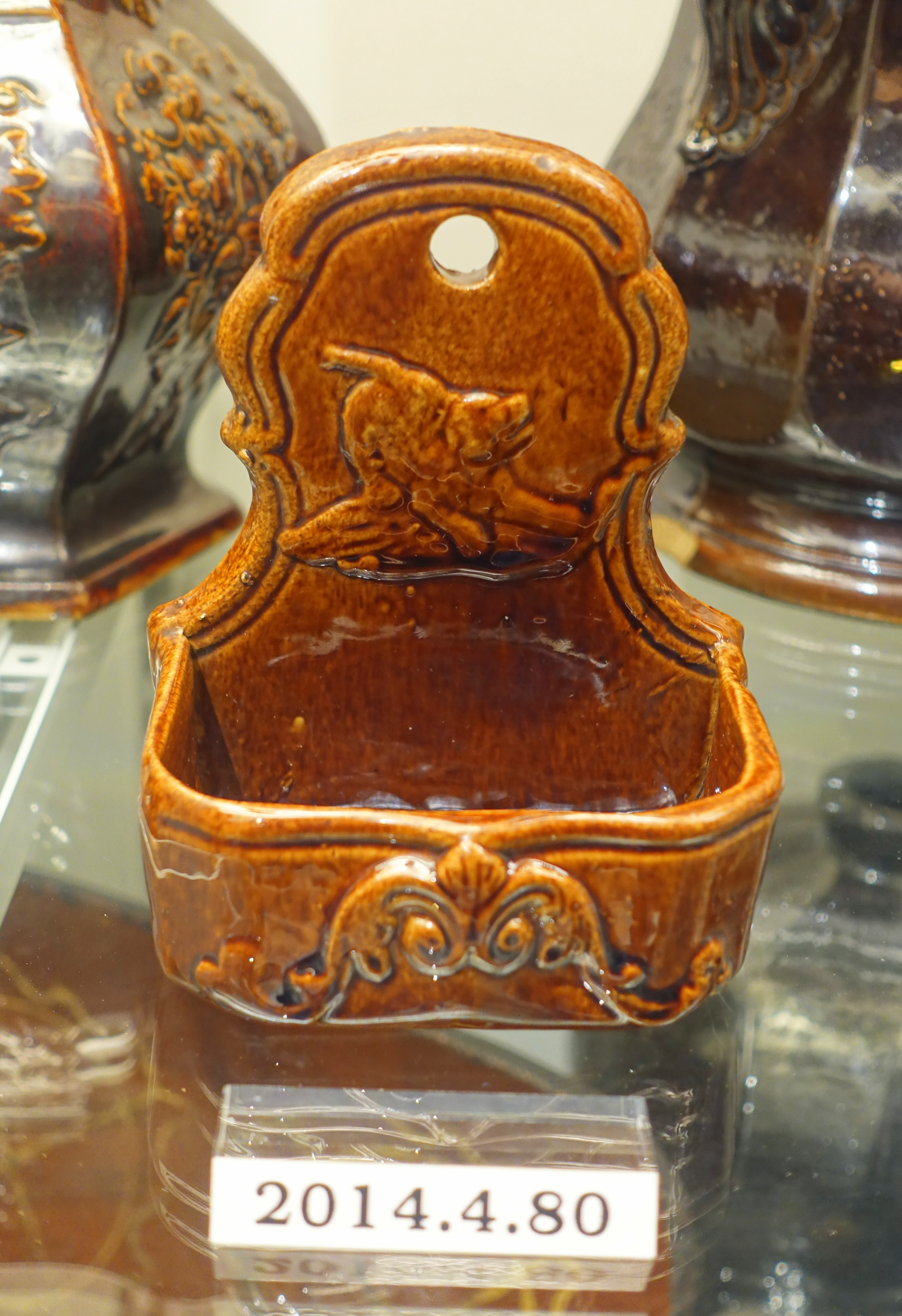
Match holder, John E. Jeffords & Co. Philadelphia City Pottery, c. 1870, lead-glazed yellow earthenware, Rockingham glaze

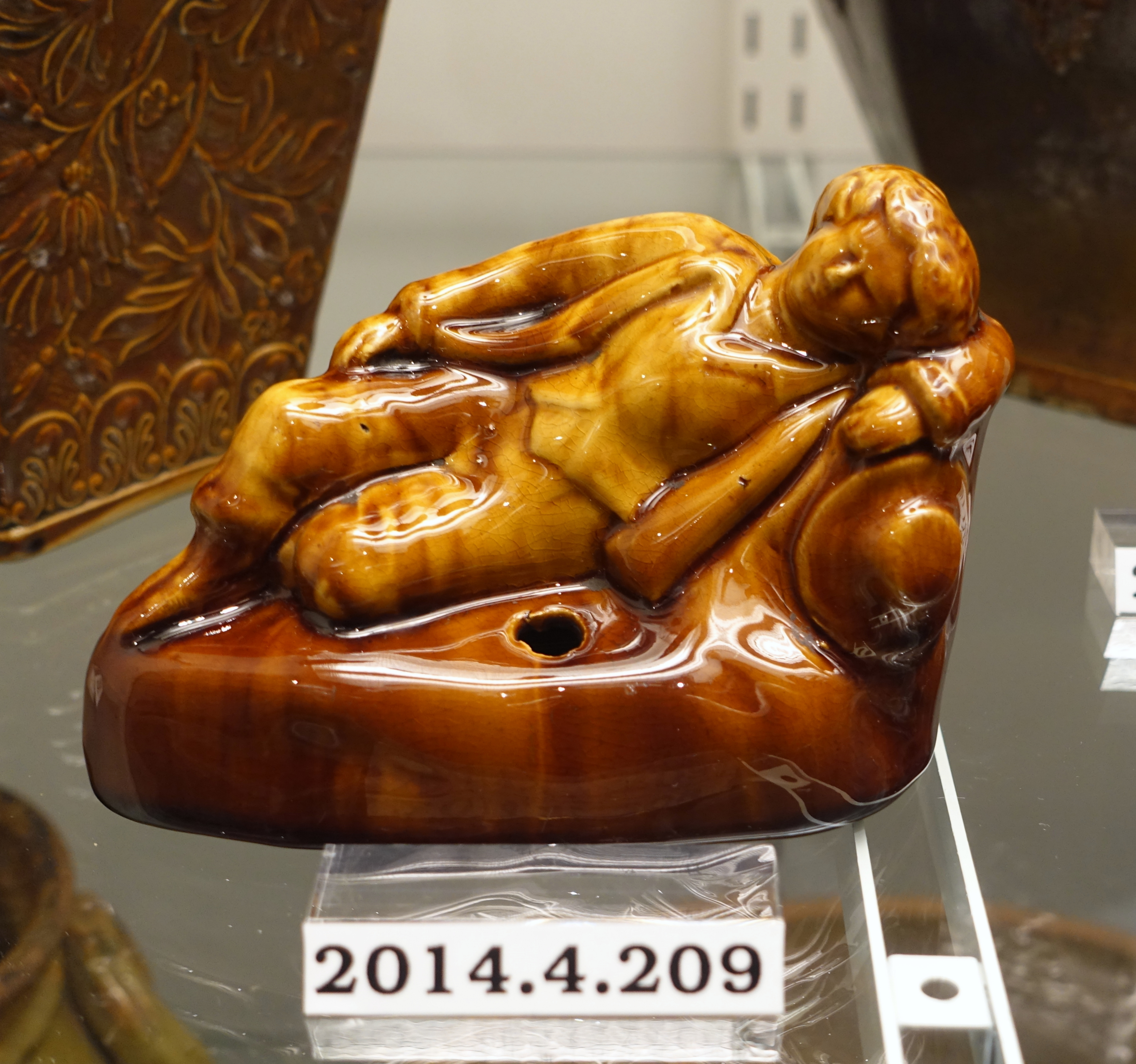
Inkwell, American or English, yellow earthenware, Rockingham glaze

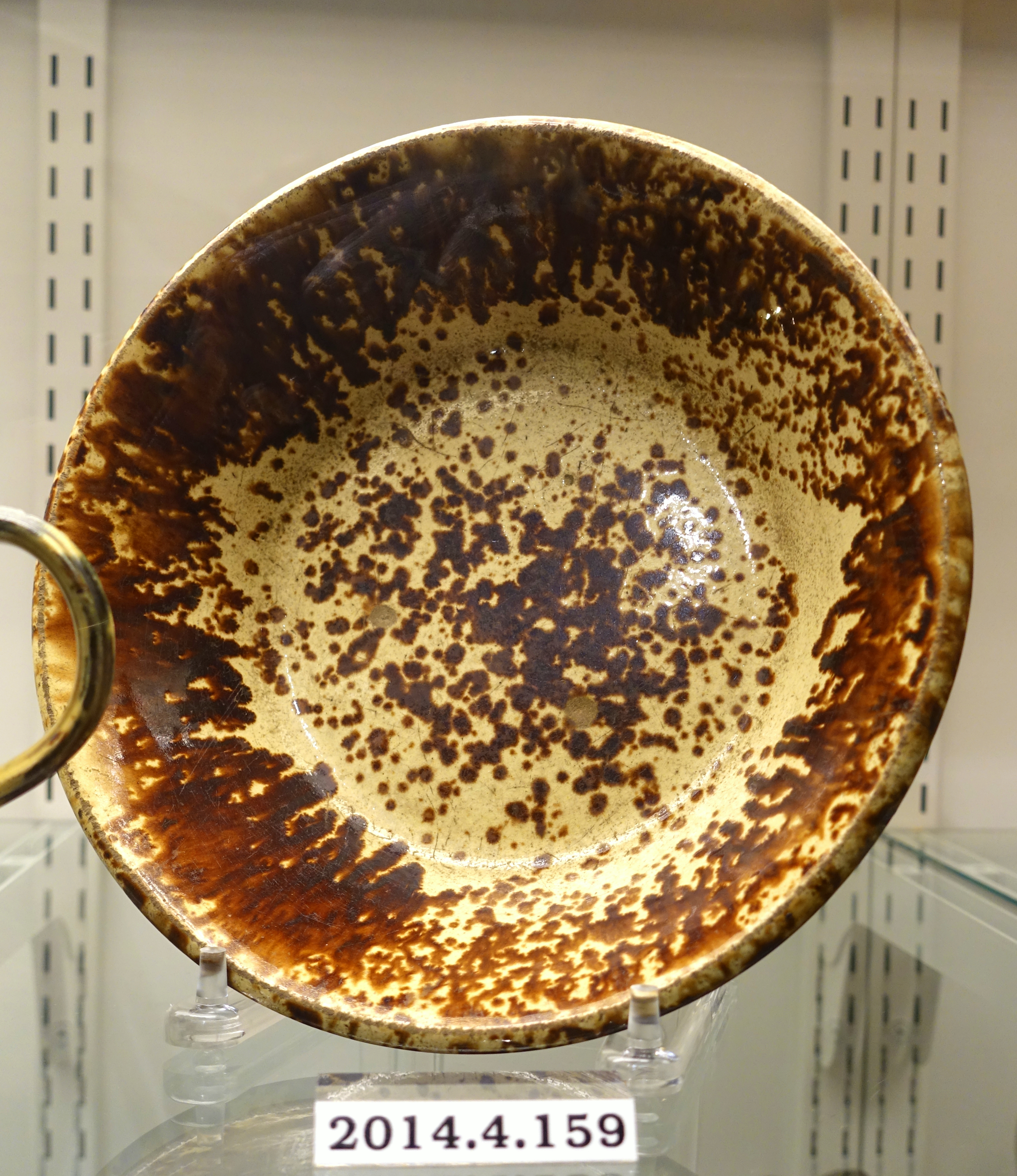
Pudding dish, Boston Earthenware Manufacturing Company, c. 1860, lead-glazed yellow earthenware, Rockingham glaze

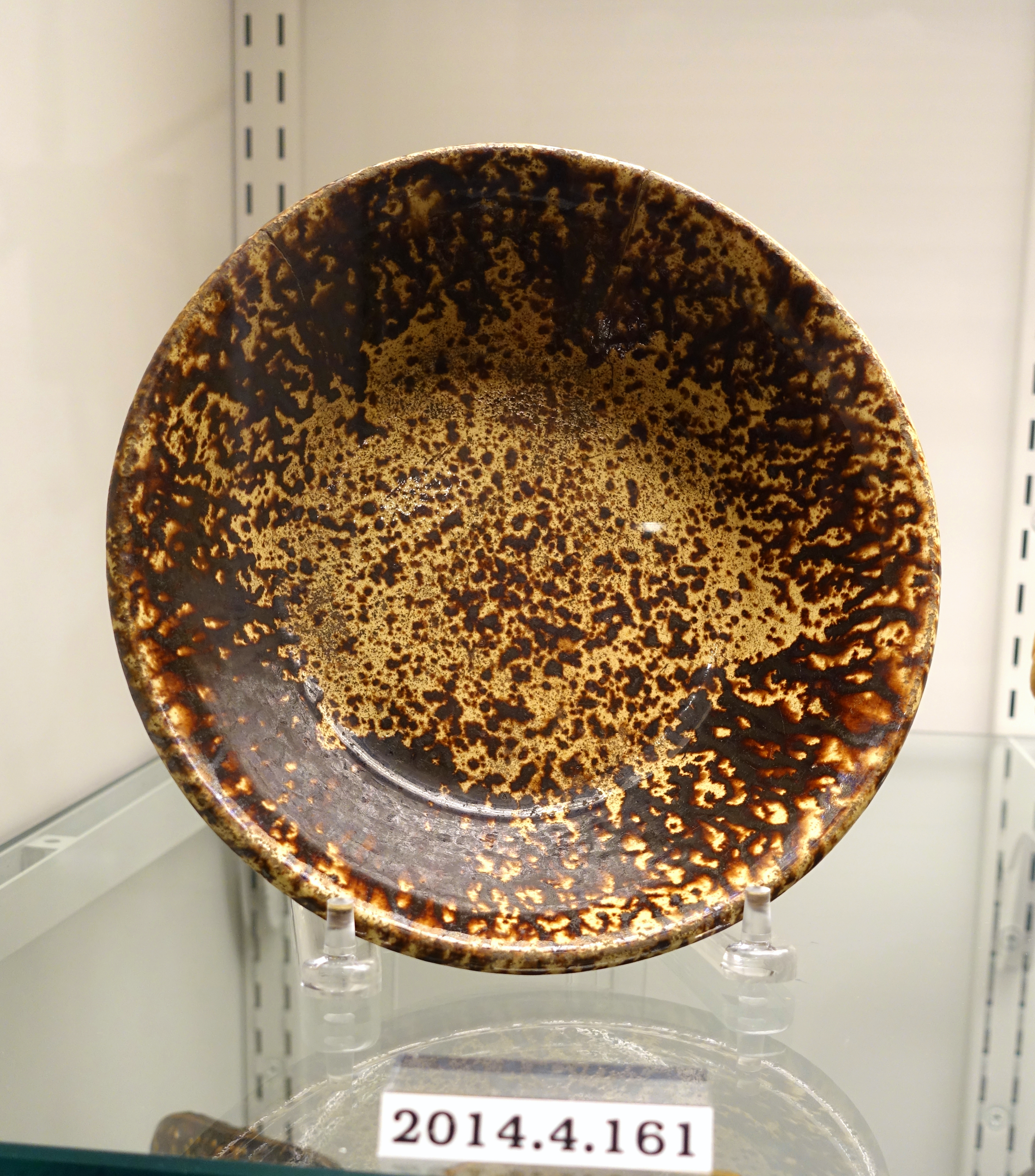
Bowl, Boston Earthenware Manufacturing Company, Massachusetts, c. 1860, lead-glazed yellow earthenware, Rockingham glaze

=== Copies ===
Some copies are known from the late 19th and early 20th century, but these are rare and the late 19th century pieces are interesting and moderately valuable in their own right, especially those by Samson. Often the backstamps do not look correct, and many are not known Rockingham shapes.

=== Modern "Rockingham" ===
Since the name Rockingham had come to describe a particular style of porcelain, the name was used by other manufacturers in the 20th century for earthenware and porcelain pieces, some of which are approximately in the style of original Rockingham. Although some were never intended to be passed off as genuine Rockingham (for example Paragon's "Rockingham" range of mid-20th century), other pieces are backstamped with a Griffin mark similar to the genuine product to the extent that the unwary could mistake them for originals. Give-aways are "Rockingham, England" and "Rockingham, Staffordshire" marks which are late 20th century and not genuine Rockingham.
