= Swinton Academy =

Academy in Swinton, Rotherham, South Yorkshire, England

Location
- East Avenue; Swinton; Rotherham, South Yorkshire, S64 8JW; England; 53.4829°N 1.3215°W

Information
- Type: Academy
- Motto: At Swinton Academy, we will make a difference
- Local authority: Rotherham
- Department for Education URN: 143141 Tables
- Ofsted: Reports
- Chair of Governors: David Lennox
- Head teacher: Chela Wilson
- Gender: Mixed
- Age: 11 to 16
- Enrolment: 750
- Capacity: 1,320
- Houses: Endeavour, Aspire, Unity & Integrity.
- Former Names: Swinton Comprehensive School; Swinton Community School
- Website: http://www.swinton.rotherham.sch.uk/

Swinton Academy is a mixed Academy and sixth form located in Swinton, South Yorkshire, England.

== Ofsted inspections ==
In November 2011, in the last inspection by Ofsted of the pre-academy school, it was judged to be a "Good" school with a good sixth form. In 2019, three years after the conversion to an Academy, Ofsted's first inspection of the academy found it to "Require Improvement".

Since the commencement of Ofsted inspections in September 1993, Swinton has undergone five inspections:

Ofsted inspection results
| Date of inspection | Name | Outcome | Ref. |
|---|---|---|---|
| 5–9 February 1996 | Swinton Comprehensive School | —N/a | |
| 22–26 November 1999 | Swinton Comprehensive School | Satisfactory | |
| 28–29 September 2005 | Swinton Community School | Satisfactory | |
| 21–22 January 2009 | Swinton Community School | Satisfactory | |
| 22–23 November 2011 | Swinton Community School | Good | |
| 24–25 September 2019 | Swinton Academy | Requires Improvement | |

== Head teachers ==
- Mr Dave Shevill, September 1997–August 2009
- Mr David Pridding, September 2009–August 2014
- Mr John Morrison, September 2014–August 2016
- Mrs Rebecca Hibberd, September 2016 – August 2023
- Mr James Graham, September 2023 - August 2024
- Mrs Chela Wilson, September 2024 - present

== Principals ==
- Mr John Morrison & Mrs Rebecca Hibberd, September 2016–August 2017
- Mrs Rebecca Hibberd, September 2017 – present
