= Swinton Boult =

Swinton Boult (1809–1876), was a secretary and director of the Liverpool, London, and Globe Insurance Company.

== Career ==
Boult commenced his life in Liverpool as local agent for insurance offices. In 1836 he founded the Liverpool Fire Office, which, after struggling with many difficulties, became, through Boult's energy, the largest fire insurance office in the world. After the great fire at the Liverpool docklands in 1842, Boult offered to the merchants of Liverpool opportunities of insuring their merchandise against fire in the various parts of the world where it was lying awaiting transshipment. Agencies, which proved very successful, were gradually opened in various parts of America and Canada, in the Baltic, in the Mediterranean, and afterwards in the East generally, and in Australia. About 1848 the company, on account of the number of its London clients, became known as the "Liverpool and London"; in 1864, on absorbing the business of the Globe Insurance Company and under the authority of parliament, the title of Liverpool, London, and Globe was assumed. At its height, the company operated throughout the Commonwealth and the United States. In 1919, it was acquired by Royal Insurance.

Boult was the principal means of introducing tariff rating as applied to cotton mills, whereby real improvements in construction are taken into account in determining the premiums; he originated the Liverpool Salvage Committee, did much to secure the passing of the Liverpool Fire Prevention Act, and devised a uniform policy for the tariff fire offices. He made a circuit of the globe in order to render himself familiar with the real nature of the fire risks which his company, in common with other fire offices, was called upon to accept; became managing director of his company, and gave evidence before various parliamentary committees on points affecting the practice of fire insurance, especially before that on fire protection which sat in 1867. He died on 8 July 1876, aged 67.
