= Leeds Pottery =

English pottery manufacturer

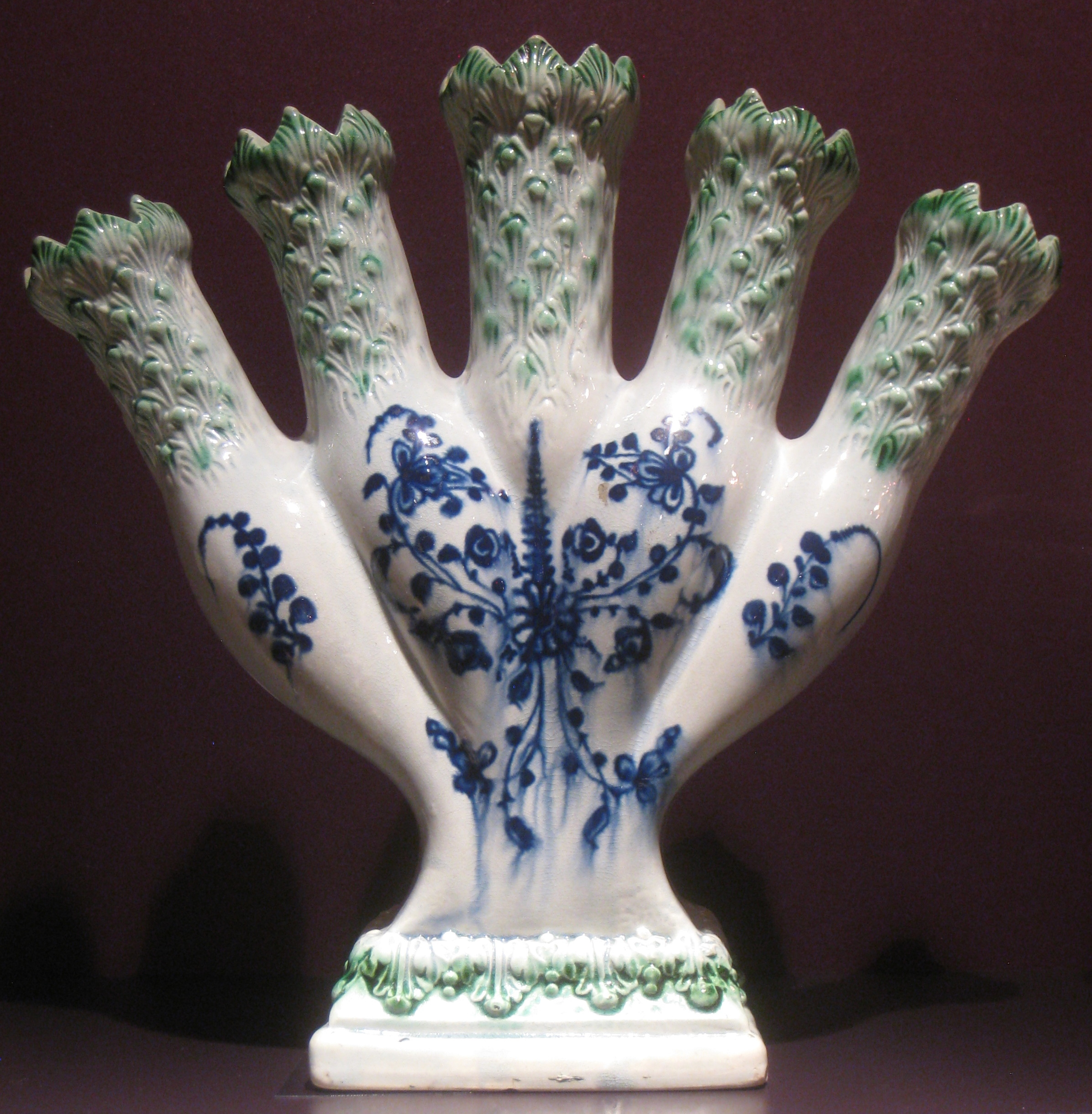
Leeds Pottery tulip vase, circa 1780, pearlware painted in underglaze blue, and green overglaze enamel

Leeds Pottery, also known as Hartley Greens & Co., is a pottery manufacturer founded around 1756 in Hunslet, just south of Leeds, England. It is best known for its creamware, which is often called Leedsware; it was the "most important rival" in this highly popular ware of Wedgwood, who had invented the improved version used from the 1760s on. Many pieces include openwork, made either by piercing solid parts, or "basketwork", weaving thin strips of clay together. Several other types of ware were produced, mostly earthenware but with some stoneware.

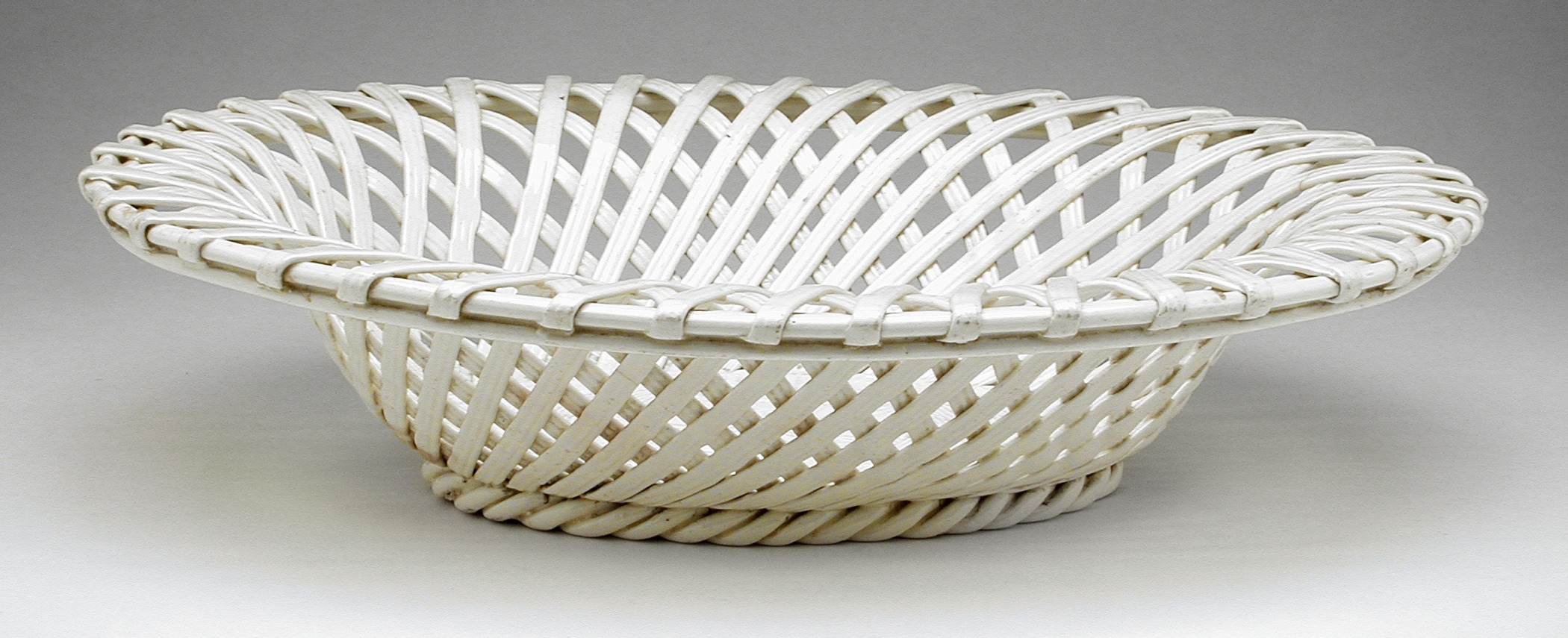
Openwork "basketwork" dish, built up by weaving strips, c. 1785

== Wares ==
The pottery produced catalogues of goods in 1783, 1785, 1786, 1794, and 1814; the pattern is somewhat indicative of the development of the business. There are other documents, and pattern books illustrating decoration, in the Leeds City Art Gallery and the Victoria & Albert Museum in London.

By 1790 the company employed 150 people. Leeds wares were lighter than those of most of their competitors, which gave them an advantage in European markets where import tariffs were based on weight. But this trade was greatly disrupted by the Napoleonic Wars. The final 1814 catalogue had over 200 general items and 48 patterns of tea, coffee, and chocolate services in a wide variety of plain, ornamented, perforated, and basketwork styles; this same catalogue continued with minor variations until a much later period. At this time, annual sales were about £30,000 per year.

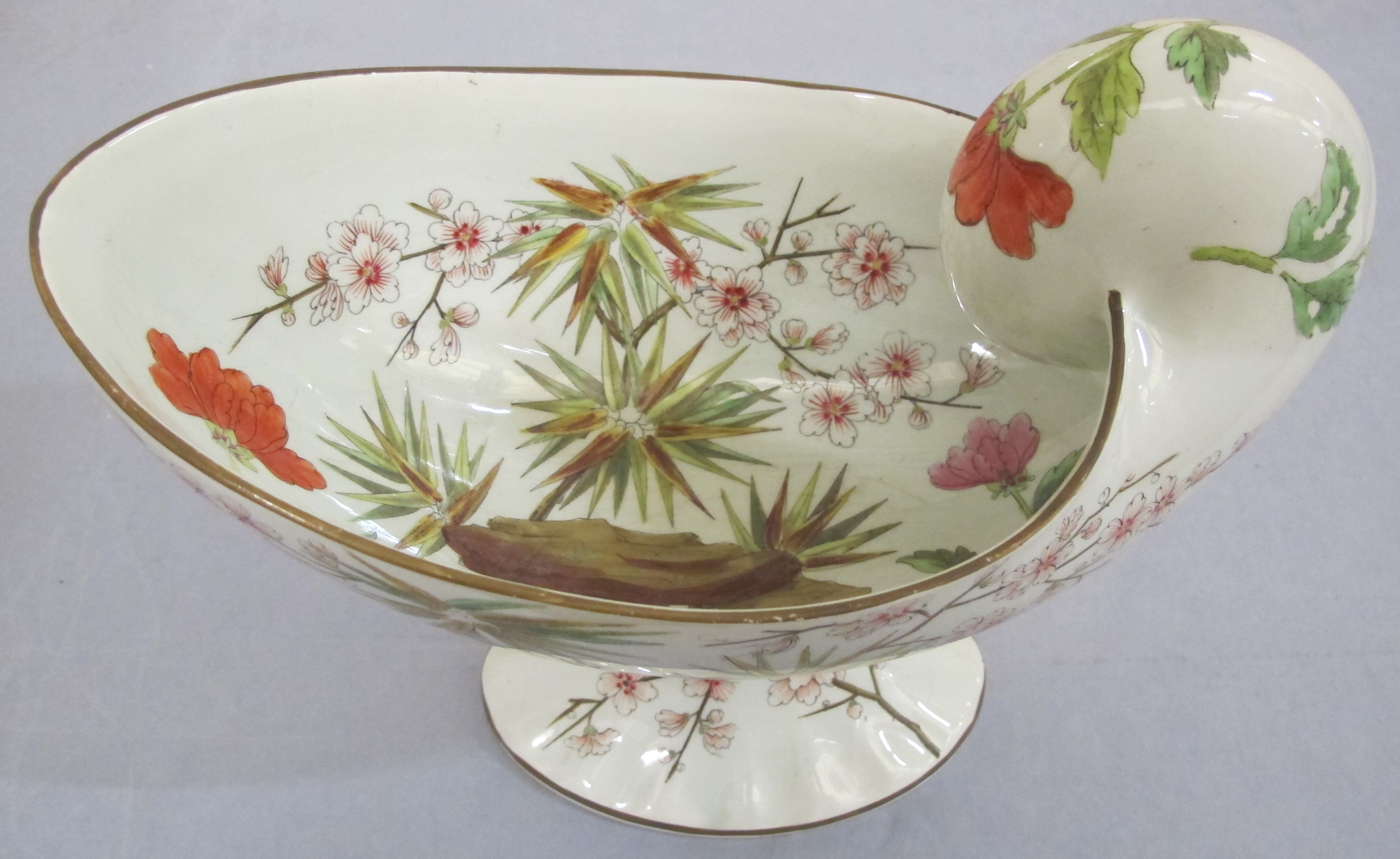
Sauce boat, c. 1775, "in a faintly Japanese style".

Although all the standard types of colour decoration were used at times (underglaze painting, overglaze enamels and transfer printing), a high proportion of the earlier wares were not decorated. Other decorative techniques used include "engine-turning", where the body is covered with coloured slip, which is then selectively removed to create a pattern, and (in the early 19th century) "resist lustre" where parts of the piece are covered before a lustreware glaze is applied. Some black "basalt" stonewares were produced, mostly teawares and after 1790. Many were "engine-turned", with geometric decoration cut on a wheel. Some figures, rather in the style of Staffordshire figures by Ralph Wood and others, were made, sold plain or enamelled.

== Marks ==
An impressed mark of "Leeds Pottery" (or "Leeds * Pottery") was introduced around 1775, to which "Hartley Greens & Co" was added from 1800. The earlier wares were unmarked, and attribution of pieces to Leeds is sometimes uncertain (with Liverpool and Swansea being the most likely alternatives). The 18th-century marks are often copied in later "reproductions" or fakes.

== Business history ==
Leeds Pottery has had a long and complex business history. It was created in Hunslet by John Green and Joshua Green, unrelated, around 1756, joined by Richard Humble in 1775 to become Humble, Green, and Co. Circa 1783 a businessman named William Hartley joined the firm, and the firm was renamed Hartley Greens & Co. The company's flint mill at Thorpe Arch was in 1814 replaced by a converted windmill on their Leeds premises.

In the early 19th century, however, the company went into a prolonged decline and from 1821 was sold repeatedly, becoming in turn Wainwright & Co., Stephen & James Chappell, Warburton & Britton, and finally Richard Britton & Sons, until it finally closed in 1881. Its buildings were then demolished. However, in 1888 production was restarted by James Wraith Senior, who used the old designs and marked his products Leeds Pottery. This business wound down in 1957. Leeds City Council restarted the brand in 1983, making reproduction pieces, but soon had to sell the business. Production was moved to Stoke-on-Trent, and in 1992 after acquisition by John Croft it was renamed Hartley Greens & Co. In 2011 it was acquired by Denby Pottery, and production moved to Middleport pottery, north of Stoke-on-Trent.

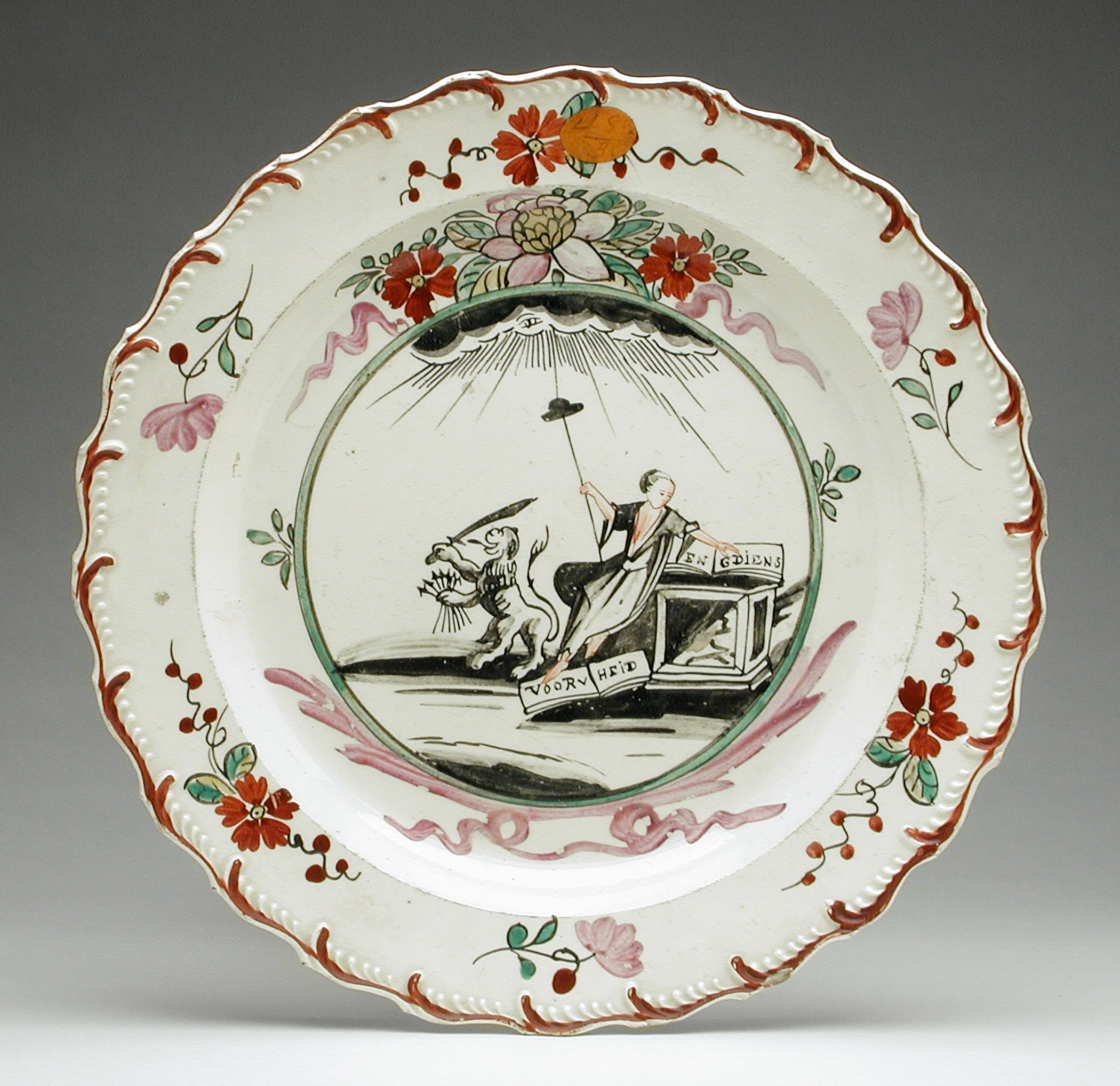
Plate with the Dutch Maiden in overglaze enamels, c. 1770; hand-painted wares such as this are relatively uncommon.

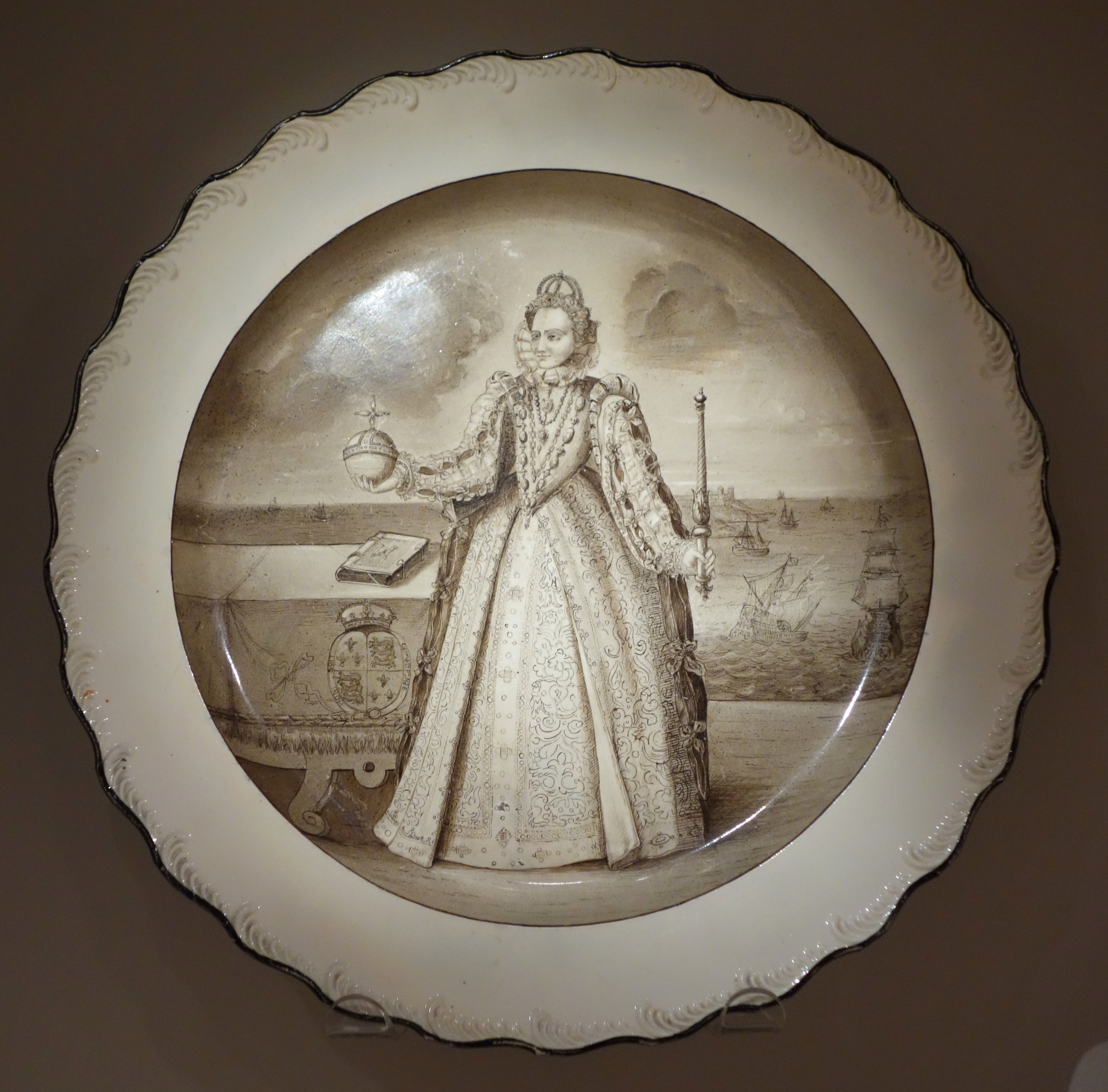
Charger with Elizabeth I of England, c. 1775, earthenware. The plate shape is the same as the previous image.

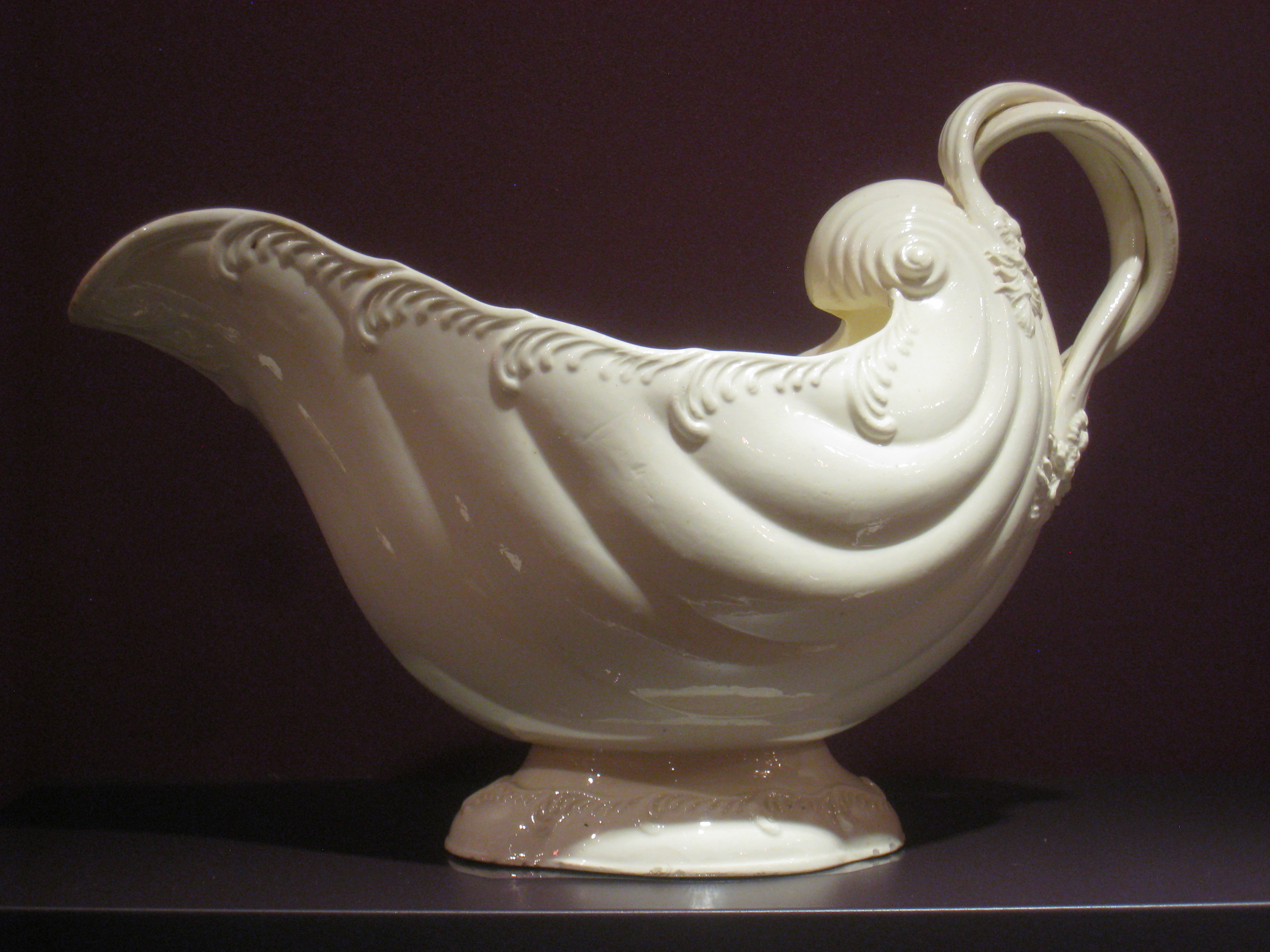
1770s sauceboat, attributed to Leeds; the twisted handle is characteristic.

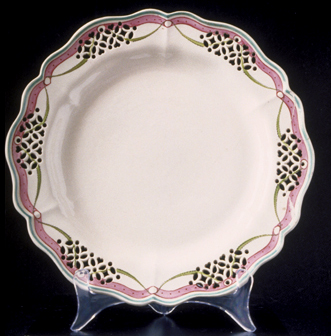
Creamware plate with pierced openwork, c. 1780

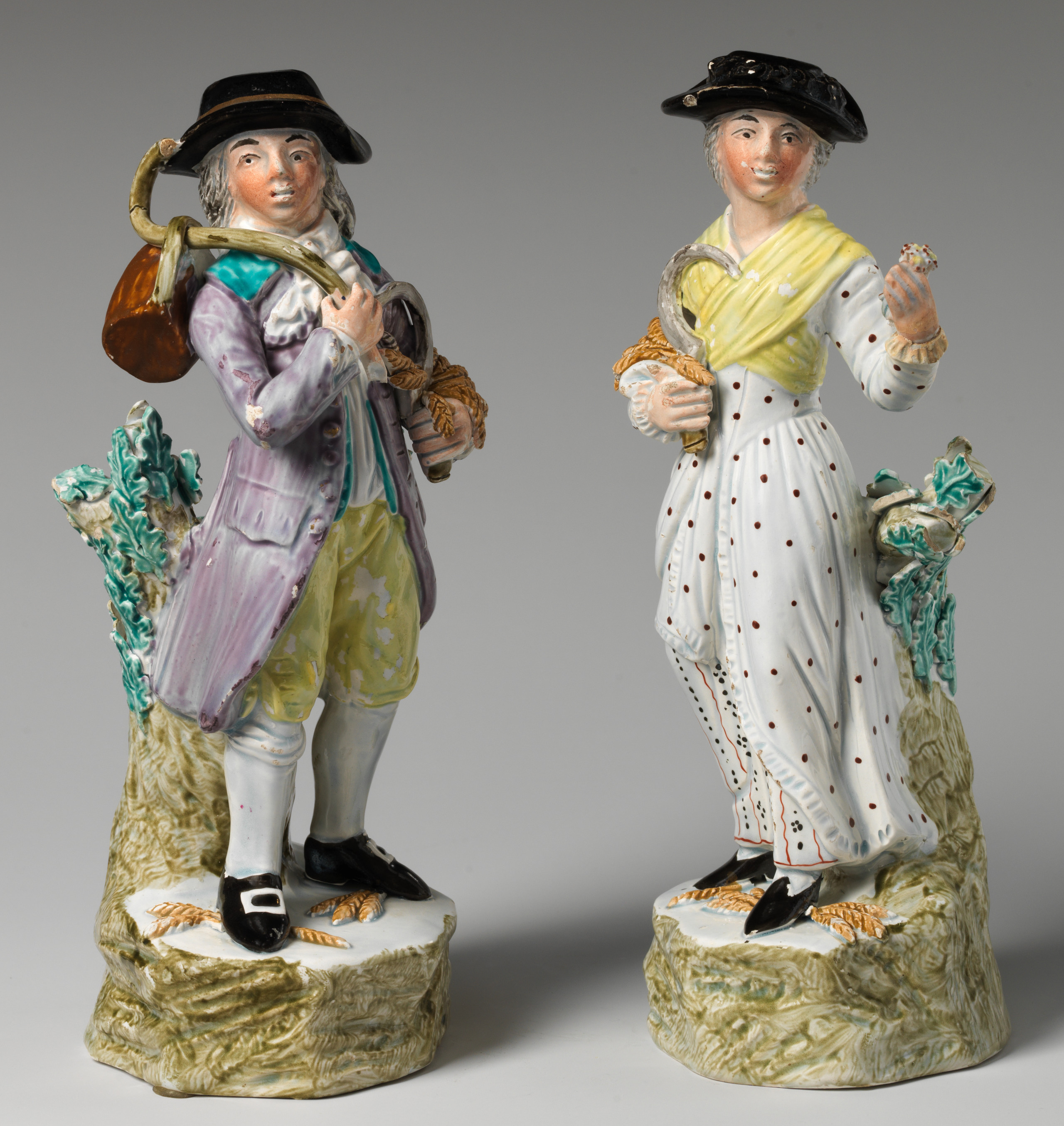
Harvester and companion, c. 1790, 7.5 inches high

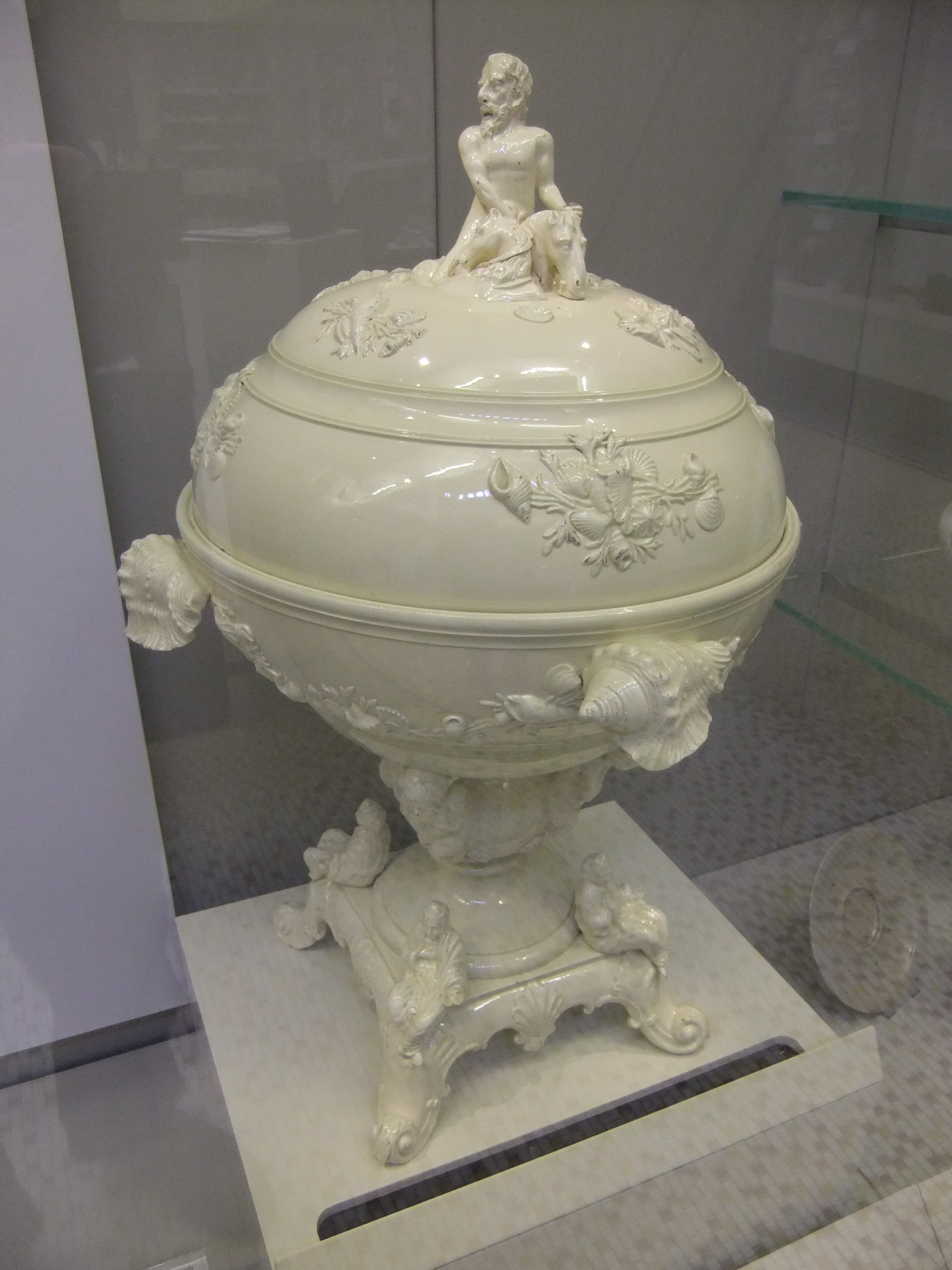
Creamware cocklepot, c. 1790

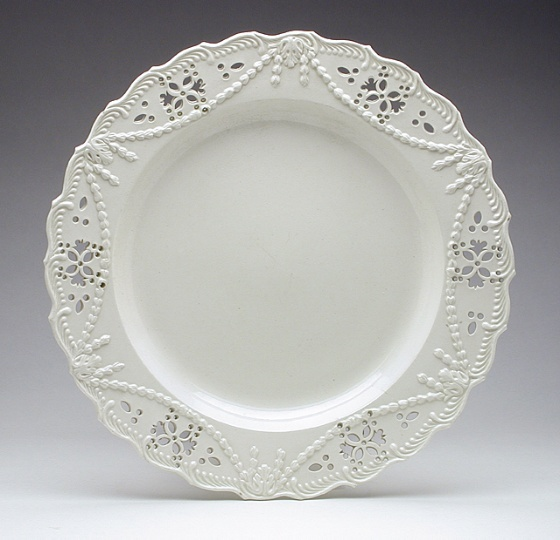
Plate with pierced openwork, 18th century

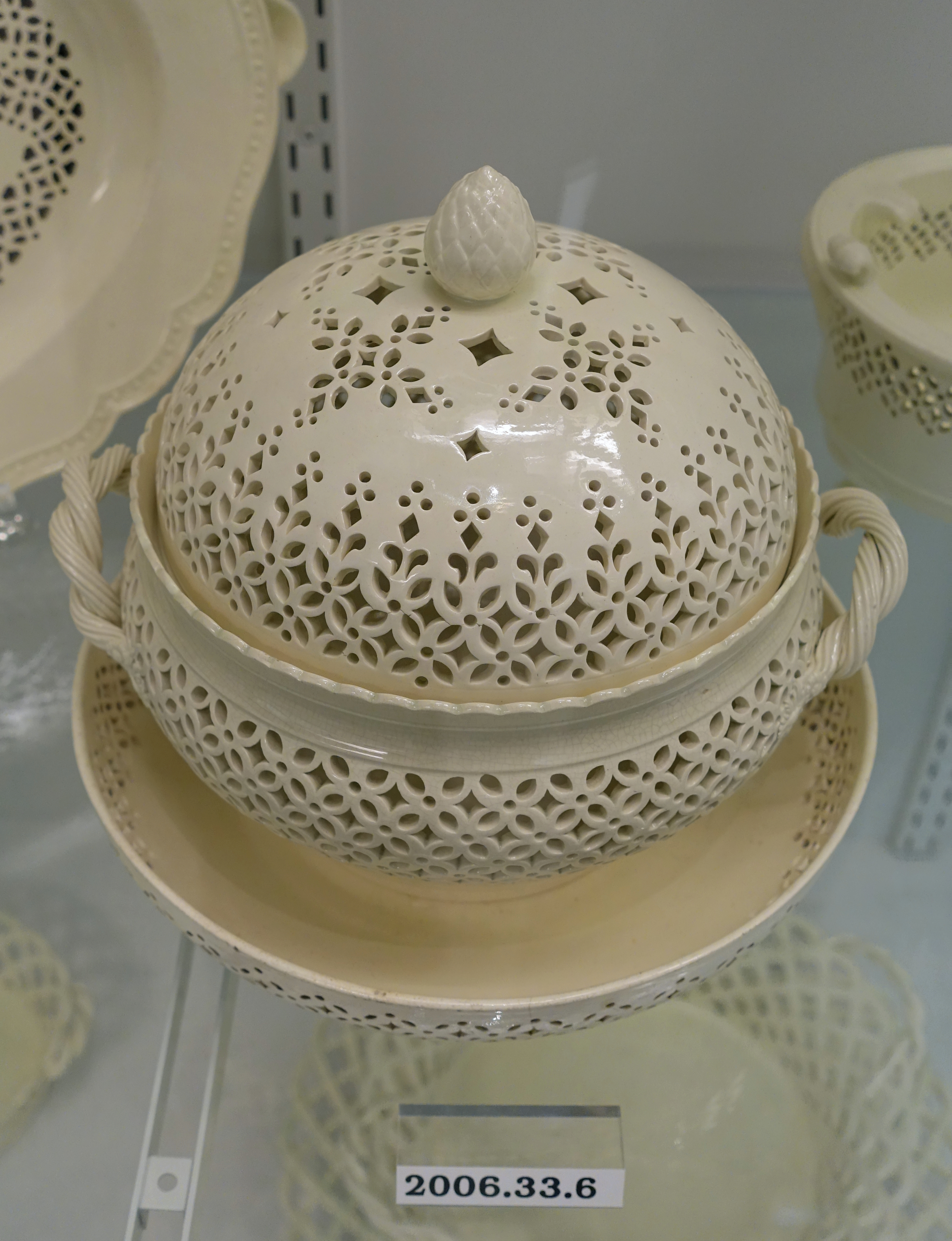
Chestnut basket on dish, attributed to Leeds Pottery, 1780-1800, creamware. Hot roast chestnuts needed to be able to "breathe".

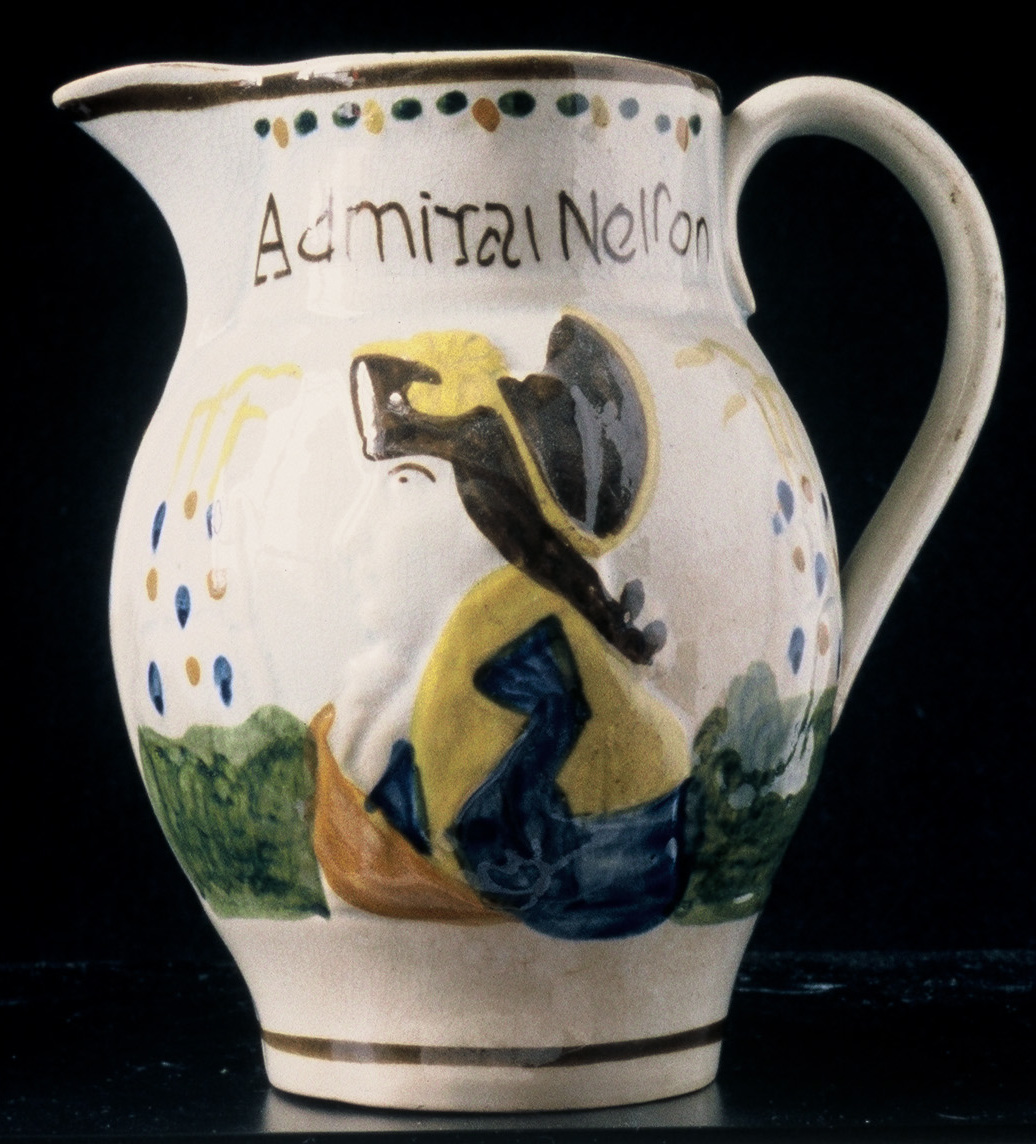
Admiral Nelson jug, probably 1790s, in Prattware, cheap lead-glazed earthenware

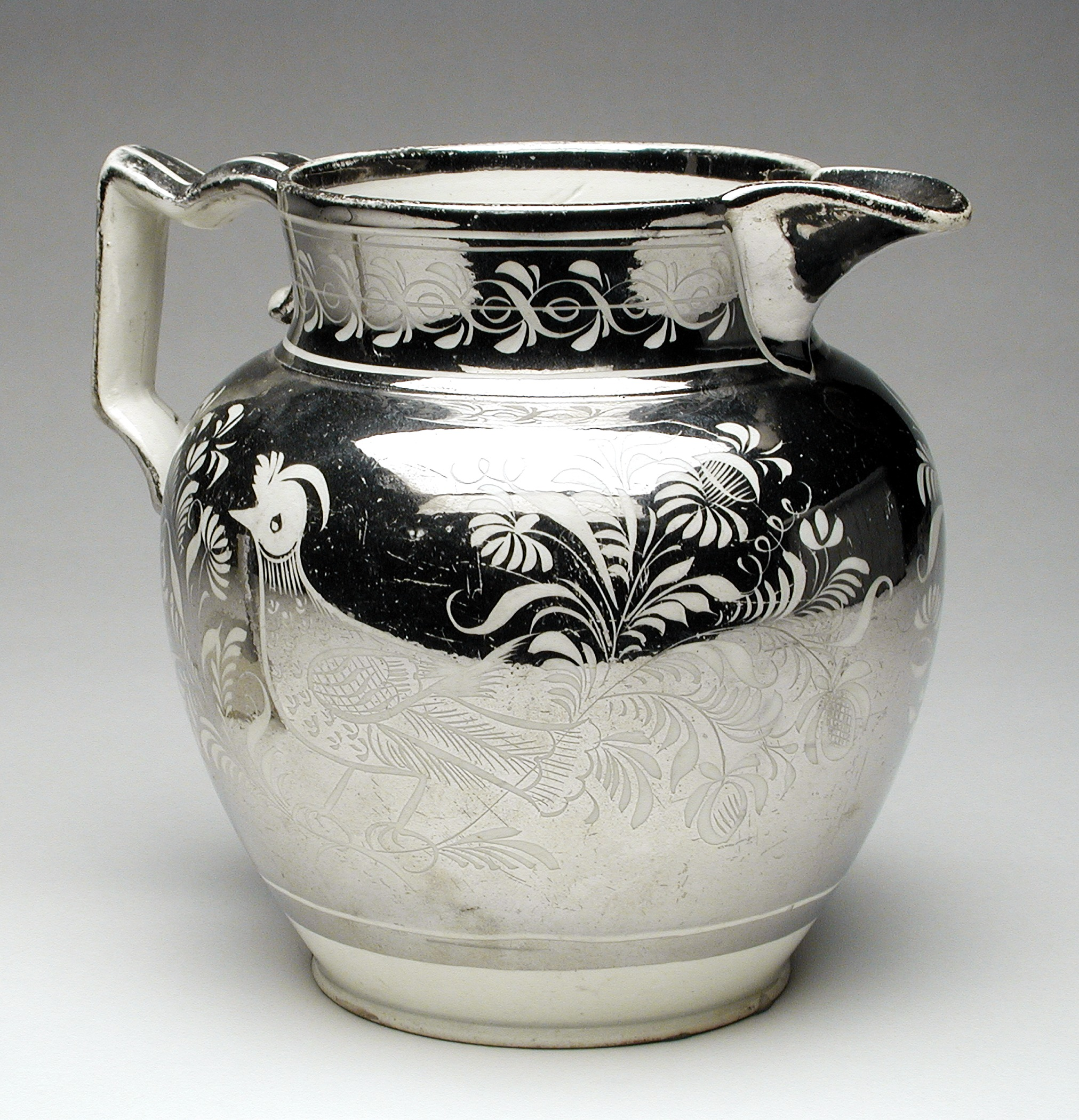
Resist lustreware jug, c. 1810
