= John Cawood (hymnwriter) =

English clergyman (1775–1852)

John Cawood (1775-1852) was an English clergyman, known as a writer of hymns.

== Life ==
He was born on 18 March 1775 in Matlock, Derbyshire, the son of Thomas Cawood, a farmer. At the age of eighteen, he entered the employment of one Rev. Carsham, at Sutton-in-Ashfield, Nottinghamshire. This position led him to prepare for a career in the ministry, and to further his knowledge he studied with Rev. Edward Spencer, rector of Wingfield, Wiltshire.
He gained entrance to St Edmund Hall, Oxford in 1797, obtaining his B.A. in 1801, and M.A. in 1807. He was taught by Rev. Isaac Crouch, and was ordained on 21 December 1800. He held the curacies of Ribbesford and Dowles under Rev. William Jesse, who presented Cawood with the perpetual curacy of St. Anne's Bewdley in 1814.

He founded a Sunday School in Bewdley and started a mission in Far Forest, which led to the building of Holy Trinity Church there in 1844. In addition to his parochial work, he was a master at Bewdley Grammar School; among his pupils may be counted Edward Feild, John Medley, Hugh Stowell, and John George Breay.

Cawood died at Bewdley on 7 November 1852, and was buried in the graveyard of the no longer extant St Andrew's Church, Dowles. His two marriages produced five children: two daughters died in infancy; his youngest child and only son, also John Cawood (1822-1894), was vicar of Pensax, and rector of Bayton and Mamble.

== Works ==
Cawood's publications include a pamphlet entitled The Church of England and Dissent (1831), and Sermons (1842). His hymns, given variously as numbering between thirteen and twenty, were rarely published with his name attached during his lifetime. Nine of them appeared in the eighth edition of Thomas Cotterill's Selection of Psalms and Hymns (1819), including the favourite "Hark! what mean those holy voices". A few were also included in the Lyra Britannica (1867).

The list below is not complete.

== Hymns ==
- A child of sin and wrath I'm born
- Almighty God! thy word is cast
- Begin a joyful song
- Behold yon wondrous star
- Blessed Father, Great Creator
- Christians, the glorious hope ye know
- Hark! what mean those holy voices
- Hark! what mean those lamentations
- In Israel's fane, by silent night
- King o'er all worlds the Saviour shone
- The Son of God, in worlds on high
- Trembling with tenderest alarms

== Settings ==
"Hark! what mean those holy voices" gained great popularity as a Christmas hymn in the nineteenth century, and was set to music by numerous composers, including Dudley Buck, Hart Pease Danks, Lowell Mason, Patty Stair, Robert Morrison Stults, Arthur Sullivan, Florence Turner-Maley, Arthur Batelle Whiting and Isaac B. Woodbury.
