= Edwin Bennett (potter) =

English potter (1818-1908)

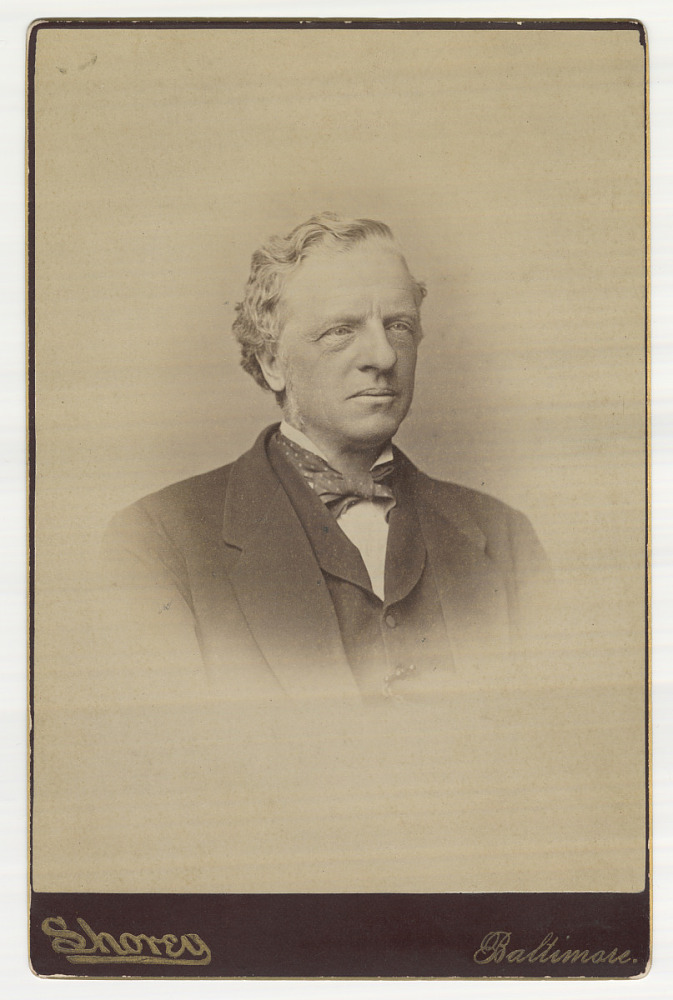
- Born: March 6, 1818; Newhall, Derbyshire, England
- Died: June 13, 1908 (aged 90)
- Known for: Industrial and art pottery

Edwin Bennett (March 6, 1818 – June 13, 1908), born in Newhall, Derbyshire, was an English American pioneer of the pottery industry and art in the United States, and founder of the Edwin Bennett Pottery Company of Baltimore, Maryland. Producing a variety of wares from the everyday to the fine and artistic, his company, originally founded in the 1840s as the Edwin Bennett Queensware Manufactory, continued in operation until forced to close during the Great Depression in 1936. Examples of Edwin Bennett pottery may be found in museums across the United States, including the Maryland Historical Society, the Philadelphia Museum of Art, the Metropolitan Museum of Art, and the National Museum of American History, as well as in private collections.

== Life ==
Edwin and his brothers, the children of Martha Webster and Daniel Bennett, a local Derbyshire coal company bookkeeper and Methodist preacher, apprenticed at the Staffordshire Potteries approximately 40 miles (64 km) from where the family lived in the East Midlands. Arriving to the United States in 1841 Edwin, described in the sources as someone of robust constitution, first worked with his brothers James, William and Daniel in East Liverpool, Ohio, where James had recently founded the pottery industry. Soon the brothers relocated to Pittsburgh to produce their wares, after which Edwin moved to Baltimore independently in 1846 and founded his own pottery with his own designs, the business growing to multiple kilns in little time. He became a citizen of the United States in 1848, in which year he was also joined by his brother William and the new partnership named E & W Bennett. They soon added new lines in coloured stonewares and majolica, and Edwin together with his brother William have ever since been considered the first creators and originators of American majolica.

Although William Ellis Tucker was the first to produce American porcelain for the American market, there have been claims that among the Bennetts' accomplishments was the first "industrial" production of porcelain in America in 1853, a line of jugs of biscuit porcelain or Parian. While it is uncertain if this is accurate or if somehow so if any of these survive, or any of those from when porcelain was produced again (or for the first time) in the 70s, examples from Bennett porcelain lines from the 1880s do, both parian and also featuring gilt, glazing and colored decoration. The acquisition of the Chesapeake Pottery increased the artistic offerings for a year of that decade before all porcelain production at both factories was ceased in 1888 due to unprofitability, even though very fine quality of different types had been reached, including the equivalent of Belleek at the Bennett factory.

Perhaps as notably, the Bennetts produced Rockingham-style ware, including the famous "Rebekah at the Well" teapot, modeled by Charles Coxon in Baltimore following Edwin's inspiration. It became the longest selling Rockingham-style ware pattern in history. Based on the special glazing of yellow ware, at the production of which the Bennetts also excelled, their own Rockingham-style ware, even if eventually considered old and unfashionable due to the market being flooded by lower quality producers of similar styles, was a mainstay of the family from their very first years in business in the United States.

Following James's retirement William left to run the Pittsburgh operation in 1856 and the Baltimore factory was renamed The Edwin Bennett Pottery. The first pitched battle of the American Civil War happened right in front of his business on April 19, 1861 and Edwin moved with his wife and children to Philadelphia, where in the next year or two he entered into a partnership with his friend the glassmaker William Gillinder, a notable maker of millefiori paperweights, with Bennett contributing some new pressed glass tableware designs. In 1867, the year he sold his interests to Gillinder and his sons, it was the largest glass factory within the city limits.

Having returned to Baltimore although with his factory continuing in production throughout the war and after, in 1869 Edwin introduced a general line of various earthenwares which were produced until 1890. Malachite glaze ware was produced in the 1860s and 70s as an alternative to the era's yellows, browns and whites (which Bennett also continued to produce). Among the later original styles he and his company are known for are the praised Albion slip-painted ware as well as the highly glazed "majolica family" Brubensul, both introduced in the mid-90s and with some rarer specimens bought by foreign governments for their national museums. It was also by the 1890s that the company was now the largest single producer of pottery in the United States, with five hundred employed artisans, fourteen large kilns, five dressing kilns, and consuming eight thousand tons of clay and coal per year. Roofing tiles were an important part of the business during this time in addition to the pottery, and of the pottery itself most of the volume was devoted to general but high quality domestic use, and to hotels and railroads. At the beginning of the 20th century Bennett himself was described by fellow potter William Percival Jervis as "more closely identified with the pottery industry of America than any other living man".

Many years after Edwin died in 1908, the Bennett Pottery Co. in its late era was also responsible for the design of the popular infuser-style "McCormick teapot".

== Family and friends ==
The Bennett brothers were long friendly with Andrew Carnegie and his family, who had lived in Ohio. Edwin once entertained Carnegie's mother Margaret, on her way to visit her son in Virginia during the Civil War, in his home on East Baltimore Street.

Edwin first married Mary Jane Huston, with whom he had eight daughters, and one son Edwin Huston Bennett who later ran the business. His second wife, Sarah Elizabeth Day, with whom he had one son, was a 1st cousin of writer Mary L. Day. Jane and Edwin's daughter Martha married William Gillinder's son James. The Gillinder's glass business also flourished for decades and they sent the Bennetts fine paperweights as presents.
