= Knowles Mill =

18th-century corn mill in England

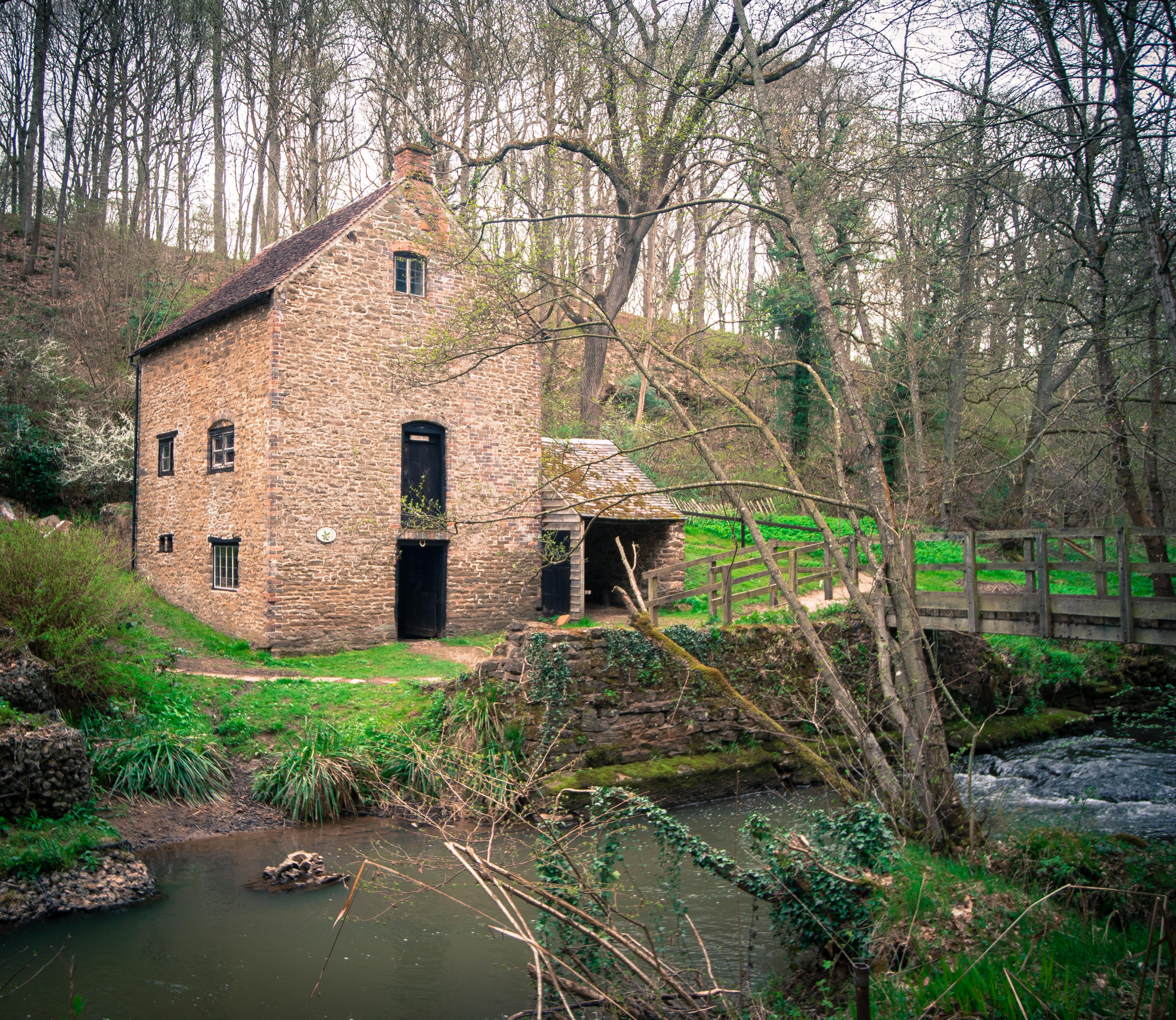
- Location: Bewdley, Worcestershire, England
- Coordinates: 52.3868°N 2.3508°W
- Type: Ruined mill
- Owner: National Trust
- Nearest parking: 3/4 mi (1,200 m) from site
- Website: www.nationaltrust.org.uk/knowles-mill

Knowles Mill is the remains of an eighteenth-century water-powered grain mill, located in the Wyre Forest in Worcestershire, England. The mill has been owned by the National Trust since 1938. The mill and its surroundings feature extant machinery, as well as notable populations of adders and wood cranesbill.

== Background ==
Knowles Mill is a Grade II listed water-powered grain mill, located on Dowles Brook, in the Wyre Forest, Bewdley, Worcestershire. The forest is the UK's largest National Nature Reserve and is administered by Forestry England, Worcestershire Wildlife Trust and Natural England. However the mill, as well as the mill pond, meadow, cottage and gardens are National Trust property.

The mill is approximately 3/4 mi (1,200 m) from the nearest car park. The path to the mill roughly follows Dowles Brook stream. The site also includes Knowles Mill Cottage, which is not accessible to the public. The woodland Knowles Coppice surrounds the mill to the south.

== History ==
One of nine possible mills that historically worked on Dowles Brook, Knowles Mill was built in the eighteenth century, and was later modified in the nineteenth century. The surviving building is two storeys high and the site also preserves an overshot mill wheel made of iron and a great spur wheel, alongside other remnant machinery. The first record of a mill on the site dates to 1757 when it was listed as for sale in a local newspaper. However there is documentary evidence preceding 1757 that lists owners of the land that the mill was built on. These owners include Arthur Palmer, c.1661, Edward Wheeler, c.1693, Roger Hunt, c.1704, Antony Betts, c.1717, Edward Faulkner, c.1722 and Daniel Crun, c.1735.

The first owner of the mill was William Crun, in 1757. It passed through a number of owners, including William and Mary Herbert, William Nicholls and Arthur Nott. The mill takes its name from the Knowles family who worked there from 1803 to the 1870s; earlier names included Coventry Mill and Upper Town Mill. The first member of the family to be listed as owner was James Knowles. The mill continued in use until 1891, when it became no longer financially viable.

It was donated to the National Trust by Paul Cadbury in 1938, along with four acres of orchards. The property was visited by the historian James Lees-Milne during his work as a curator for the Trust.

== Archaeology ==
In 2010 Birmingham Archaeology investigated the site and found the remains of a cast iron mill wheel, as well as "remains of the head race culvert"; other trenches investigated water flow and the mill race. Artefacts from the excavations included a 17th-century yellowware pancheon bowl, a Sankey flowerpot, two shards of 18th-century green glass, an early 20th-century pocket-watch and a blue poison bottle inscribed "NOT TO BE TAKEN" from the wheel pit. There were 149 bottles or fragments of glass excavated from the site, representing brands such as Gartons HP Sauce, Bovril, Kidderminster Brewery, White Horse Distillers, Watville Dairies and Venos cough medicine.

== Conservation ==
Since 1982, climatological measurements have been made at Knowles Mill and have been recorded and analysed at the University of Birmingham. The area surrounding the mill is notable for its adder populations, and for the presence of wood cranesbill.

== Gallery ==
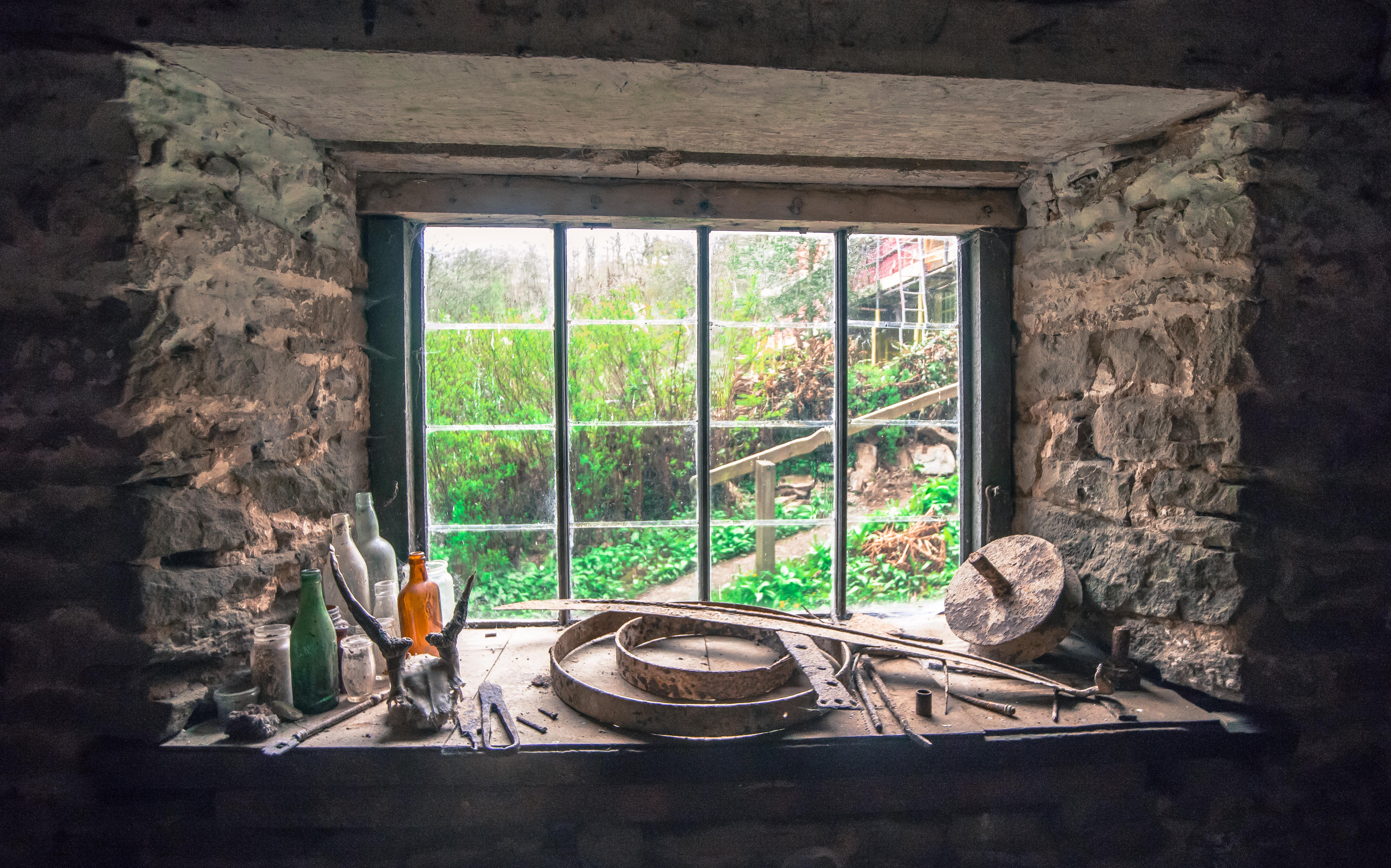
Knowles Mill, interior

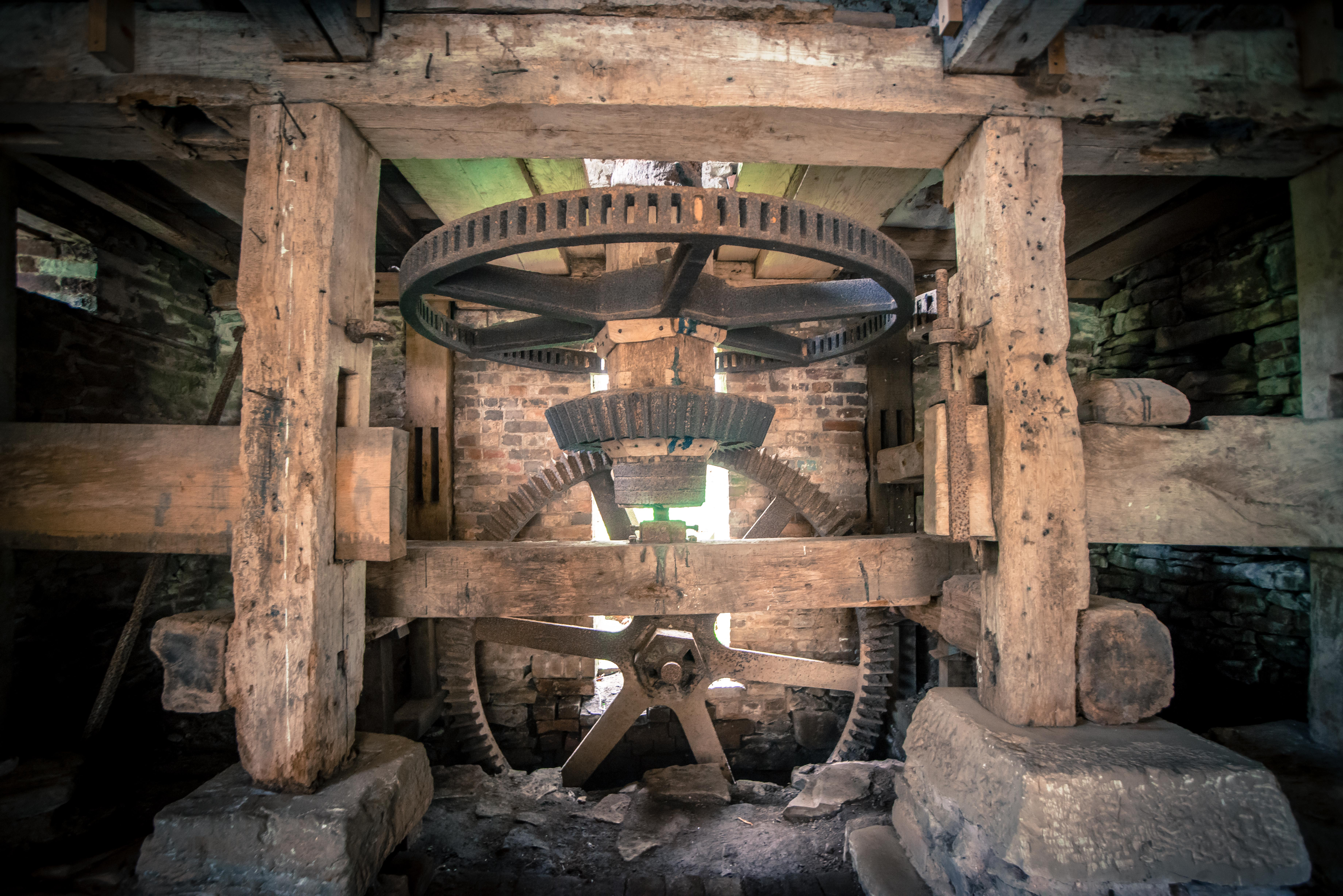
Mill mechanism

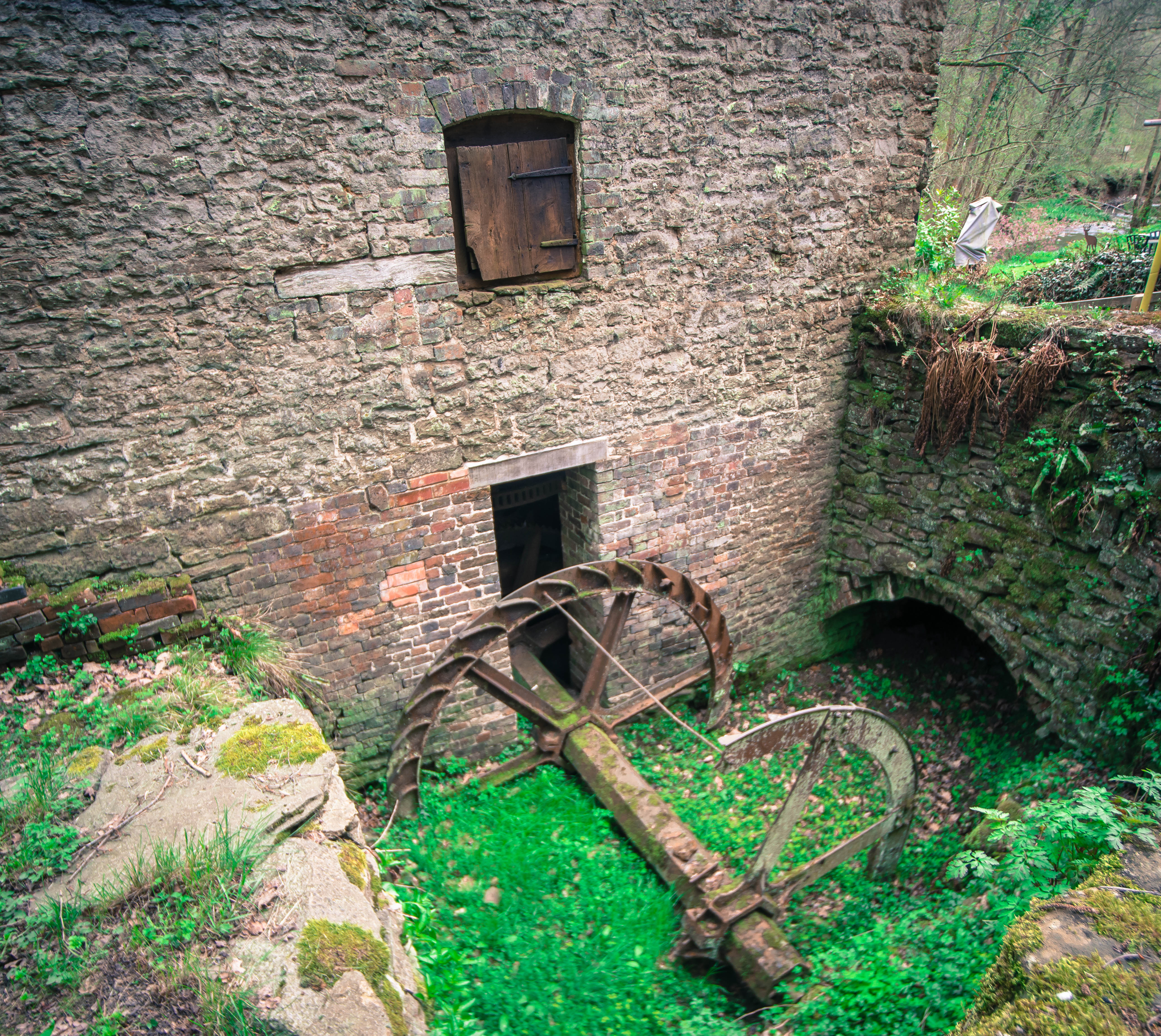
Wheel-pit and waterwheel

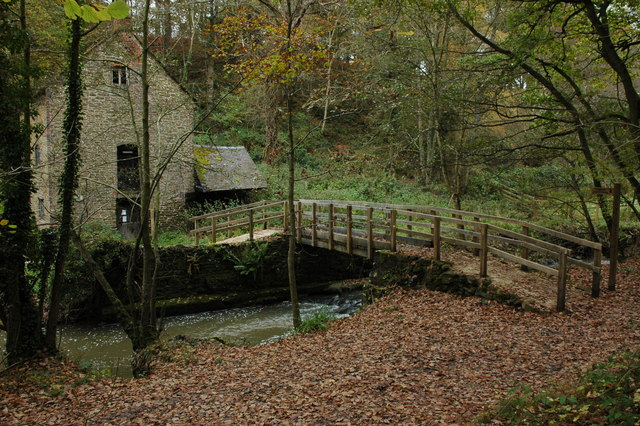
Footbridge at Knowles Mill

== See also ==
- List of National Trust properties in England
- List of watermills in the United Kingdom
