= James Bennett (potter) =

James Bennett (13 May 1812 - 30 July 1862) was an English-American potter who played a foundational role in the development of the ceramics industry in the United States. As one of the first potters to establish large-scale production in East Liverpool, Ohio, he helped transform the region into a major center for pottery manufacturing.

== Early life and immigration ==
James Bennett was born on May 13, 1812 in Derbyshire, England, into a family with deep ties to the pottery trade. He trained in traditional Staffordshire pottery techniques before emigrating to the United States in 1838, seeking new opportunities in the growing American market.

Initially, Bennett attempted to establish a pottery business in Birmingham, Pennsylvania, but encountered financial difficulties. In 1839, he moved to East Liverpool, Ohio, drawn by the area's rich clay deposits and access to river transportation. There, he founded the first successful commercial pottery in the region, producing Rockingham and yellowware ceramics.

== Establishment of the East Liverpool Pottery industry ==
Bennett's East Liverpool pottery introduced Staffordshire-style techniques that greatly improved American ceramics. His factory utilized advanced kiln-firing methods and glazing techniques that enhanced durability and aesthetic appeal.

In 1844, he relocated his operations to Pittsburgh, Pennsylvania, but his success in East Liverpool spurred a migration of English potters to the town. As a result, East Liverpool developed into a leading pottery center and earned nicknames such as "Ceramic City" and "Pottery Capital of America".

== Influence and industry growth ==
Bennett's innovations laid the foundation for industrial-scale ceramics production in the United States. Many of his employees and apprentices went on to establish their own pottery firms, contributing to the rapid expansion of the industry in East Liverpool. By the late 19th and early 20th centuries, the region was home to numerous pottery manufacturers, supplying ceramics to households across the country.

Bennett's younger brothers, Daniel and Edwin Bennett, also became prominent potters. Edwin later founded the Edwin Bennett Pottery Company in Baltimore, Maryland, further expanding the family's influence on American ceramics.

== Death and legacy ==
James Bennett died on July 30, 1862, but his contributions to American ceramics endured. East Liverpool remained a dominant force in pottery manufacturing for over a century, with firms such as the Homer Laughlin China Company continuing the tradition of high-quality ceramic production. Today, his legacy is preserved at the Museum of Ceramics in East Liverpool, which houses artifacts and historical records documenting the region's pottery industry.

He is buried at Concord Presbyterian Church Cemetery in Carrick, Pennsylvania alongside his wife, Jane (née Stevenson, 1820–1861) and their youngest born son, Andrew Carnegie Bennett (1861–1861).
