= Jannion Steele Elliott =

British ornithologist and naturalist

- Born: 25 May 1871; Bedford, Bedfordshire, England
- Died: 27 March 1942 (aged 70); Kerry, Montgomeryshire
- Education: Bedford Modern School
- Known for: Ornithologist and naturalist

Jannion Steele Elliott (25 May 1871 – 27 March 1942), his surname sometimes hyphenated to Steele-Elliott, was a British ornithologist and naturalist who, in particular, accumulated large amounts of information on the mammals and birds of Bedfordshire.

== Life ==
Elliott was born in Bedford on 25 May 1871 to William Elliott, an Inland Revenue officer, and his wife Elizabeth (née Jones). He was educated at Bedford Modern School.

From 1896, Elliott co-owned a foundry business (Robbins & Co.) in Dudley, West Midlands with his brother William. The business specialised in making fire grates and Elliott and his brother filed three patent applications regarding the improvement of the domestic fire grate. However, Elliott's main interest was ornithology.

Elliott published his first book The Vertebrate Fauna of Bedfordshire at his own expense in 1901. In their book, The Birds of Bedfordshire (1991), Paul Trodd and David Kramer stated that "the works of Jannion Steele Elliott were our base reference and it is only now that we can appreciate the importance of his writings when comparing the status of species than with those of today."

Elliott developed a large collection of the local birds of Bedfordshire which he gave to the Pritchard Museum of Bedford Modern School which was later to become a key component of the Bedford Museum. His collection was later transferred to the Luton Museum.

Of Elliott, the British ornithologist Bruce Campbell stated: "On June 4th, 1903, Jannion Steele-Elliott, the great Bedfordshire naturalist and his friend Ronald Bruce Campbell, my father, spent the day at Southill Park and found nests with eggs of 27 different species of bird, a feat which can have few parallels in British field ornithology."

Elliott was a Tring correspondent (1899–1942) and records of his ornithological work are kept in the archives of the Natural History Museum.

Elliott married firstly, in 1898, Caroline Emma Thompson, with whom he had a son (William Jannion, 1900–1929) and daughter (Marjory Caroline, born 1899); Caroline died in 1909. On 30 July 1925, Elliott married secondly Doris Amie, daughter of John Eccleston Sheldon, of Moorcroft, Barnt Green, Worcestershire, and former wife of Captain Mervyn Edward John Wingfield-Stratford (1883–1922), of the Worcester Regiment. Captain Mervyn Wingfield-Stratford was the first cousin of Georgina Grace Ida Wingfield-Stratford, wife of Elliott's son, William; the Wingfield-Stratfords descended from the politicians Richard Wingfield, 3rd Viscount Powerscourt and John Stratford, 1st Earl of Aldborough. Their daughter, Petronilla, married Peter Trustram Eve, son of the 1st Baron Silsoe.

Elliott had lived in Clent, 16 kilometres (9.9 mi) south of the foundry in Dudley, until 1902. That year, he moved his family 18 km (11 mi) west when he purchased the Elizabethan era building, Dowles Manor, near the confluence of Dowles Brook into the River Severn, at the eastern edge of the Wyre Forest. The manor, 1.5 km (0.9 mi) northwest of the center of Bewdley, Worcestershire, is in the former civil parish of Dowles. By the time of his death, in 1942, he had bought up the surrounding land, piecemeal, until he owned the portion of the valley, formed by the Dowles Brook, surrounding Dowles Manor; he maintained this land as a nature reserve. At Dowles Manor, he entertained friends and fellow naturalists including Charles Oldham, Thomas Coward and Herbert Forrest.

He died on 27 March 1942, when visiting his brother at Kerry, Montgomeryshire.

== Bibliography ==
Among the publications of Steele Elliott are:

- Steele-Elliott, J. (1897). The Vertebrate Fauna of Bedfordshire. Birmingham: privately published; printed by Robert Birbeck & Sons. OCLC 1051546662.
- Purple Heron in Herts, 1903
- Steele Elliott, Jannion (1918). Concerning the Manor House, Dowles, and its demesne ... With illustrations, plans, and map. Dudley: Herald Press. OCLC 560072309.
- Steele Elliott, J. (1936). "Local Duck Decoys". Survey of Ancient Buildings. Vol. 3. Aspley Guise: Bedfordshire Historical Record Society. OCLC 1114791242.
- Steele Elliott, J. (1936). Bedfordshire 'vermin' Payments: Concerning the Destruction of 'vermin' by Parish Officials During the XVI-XIX Centuries, with Extracts from Their Accounts. Luton Beds.: Luton Public Museum. OCLC 12176269.
