= John Cawood =

John Cawood may refer to:

- John Cawood (printer) (1514–1572), English printer
- John Cawood (hymnwriter) (1775–1852), English clergyman and hymnwriter
- John C. Cawood, Australian politician, served as first Government Resident of Central Australia 1926–1929
