= Dowles Church =

Demolished church near Bewdley, England

Coordinates: 52.3837°N 2.3242°W

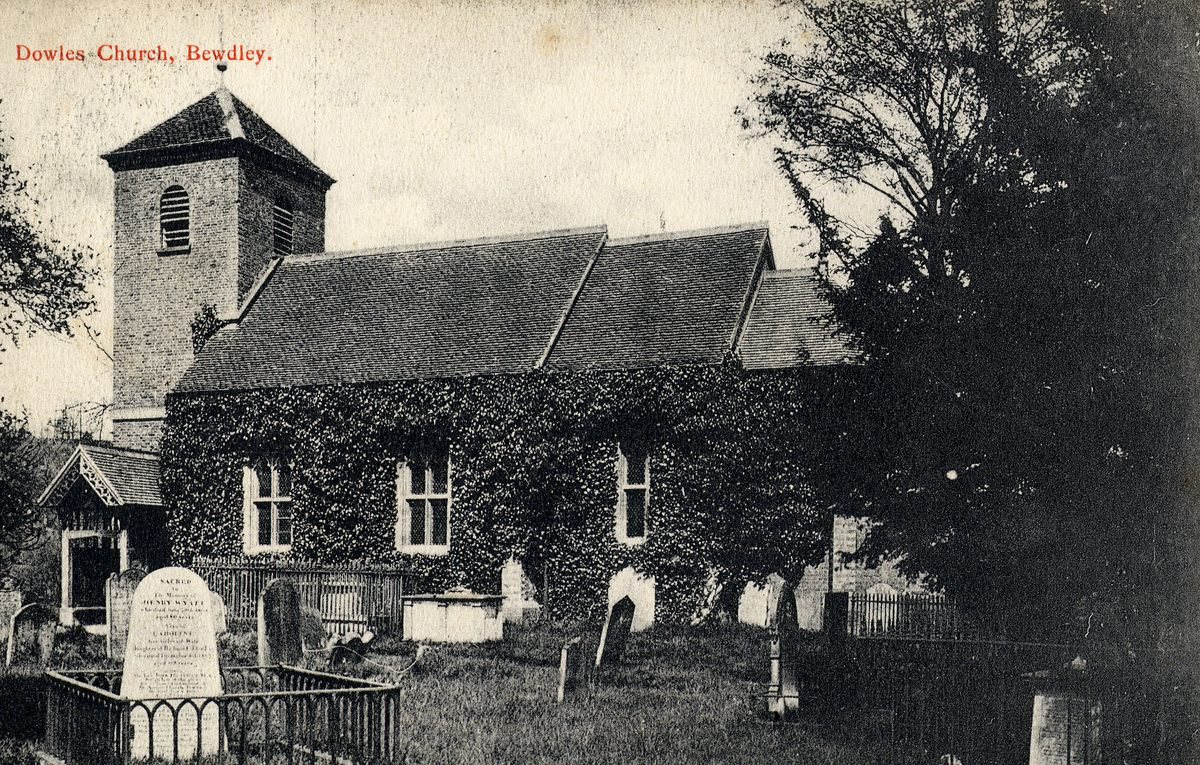
- Dowles Church prior to demolition (c.1905).

- Location within Worcestershire
- OS grid reference: SO 78003 76219
- Civil parish: Upper Arley
- District: Wyre Forest
- Shire county: Worcestershire
- Region: West Midlands
- Country: England
- Sovereign state: United Kingdom

Dowles Church is a demolished Church in the Parish of Upper Arley in England. Only the ruined Parish House and graveyard remain today. Dedicated to Saint Andrew, the site of the church is approximately 1 mile outside of Bewdley and accessible using the North Worcestershire Path and the Geopark Way. It was constructed as part of the Dowles Manor estate in Dowles.

== Appearance upon demolition ==
Dowles Church had a quasi-gothic appearance, surrounded by a graveyard and accompanied by a smaller Parish House. Its tower stood above a grey slate roof; supported by brick walls covered completely in ivy, permeated by windows traceried by red sandstone. There was a wooden porch above and around the door beneath the tower. Inside: an organ chamber was present that corresponded with the rest of the design through the sandstone that was used to detail the church. The baptismal font had a circular design, and was likely younger than the church in which it was situated. The pulpit, however, was much older. It bore the date ‘1695’ and the initials ‘I.G.’ ‘I.B.’. A piece of framed artwork served as the reredos of the altar, inscribed ‘Fraunces ap Bowen gave this Gifter 1669’. On the south side of the chancel: there was a Jacobean bench for secular use, in contrast to the rest of the church. It too had an inscription: ‘Sit Down Ye Weary.’

There were two bells inside Dowles Church:

- The first, by Westcote of Bristol, inscribed ‘R Northall Churchwarden 1823’
- The second, by John Greene of Worcester, ‘W. G. 1595.’

== History ==
There has been a church on the site of Dowles Church since it was first recorded c.1217.

Dowles Church (as it was demolished) was constructed c.1789 upon a much older church, thought to have been constructed sometime before 1217. The church was originally dedicated to Saint Lawrence, before being rededicated to Saint Andrew after its construction. The church was then modified c.1882, adding a semi-octagonal apse, new quasi-gothic windows, and converting the chancel and tower arches to the two-centred form. These details were all produced in red sandstone, a common rock in Bewdley.

Later still, an organ chamber was added in red brick. It had traceried windows of sandstone, corresponding with the red brick and sandstone of the windows of the chancel and nave.

The church was demolished c.1956 due to disuse.

The surviving (now ruined) Parish House was constructed alongside the church. Part of this structure and the church's graveyard are still standing and can be visited to the present.

== Parish House ==
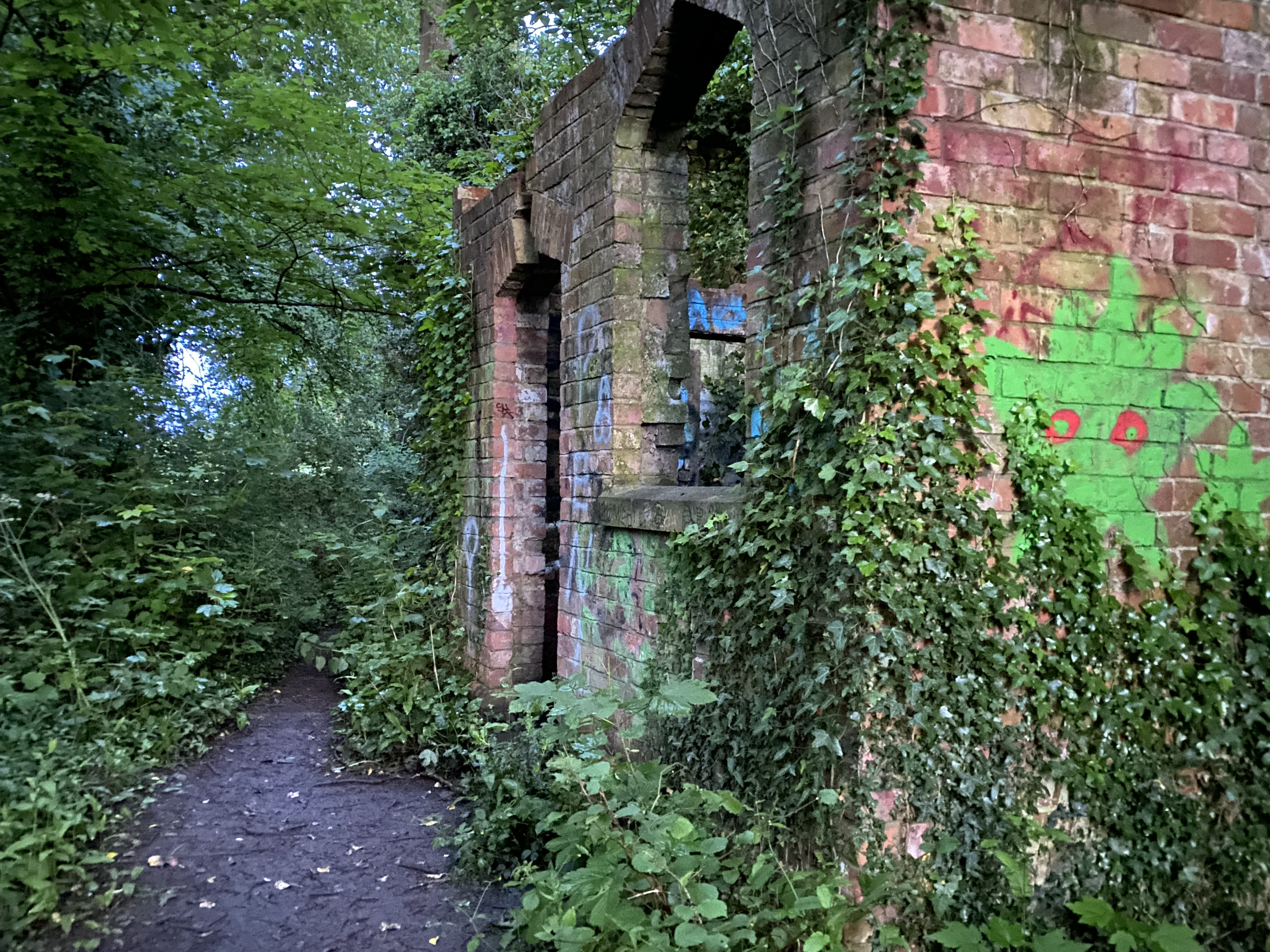
The graffitied ruins of the Parish House at Dowles

Dowles Church had a Parish House separate from the church itself. It still remains (ruined) today. It is a common misconception locally that the remains of the Parish House are the remains of the church itself.

== Graveyard ==
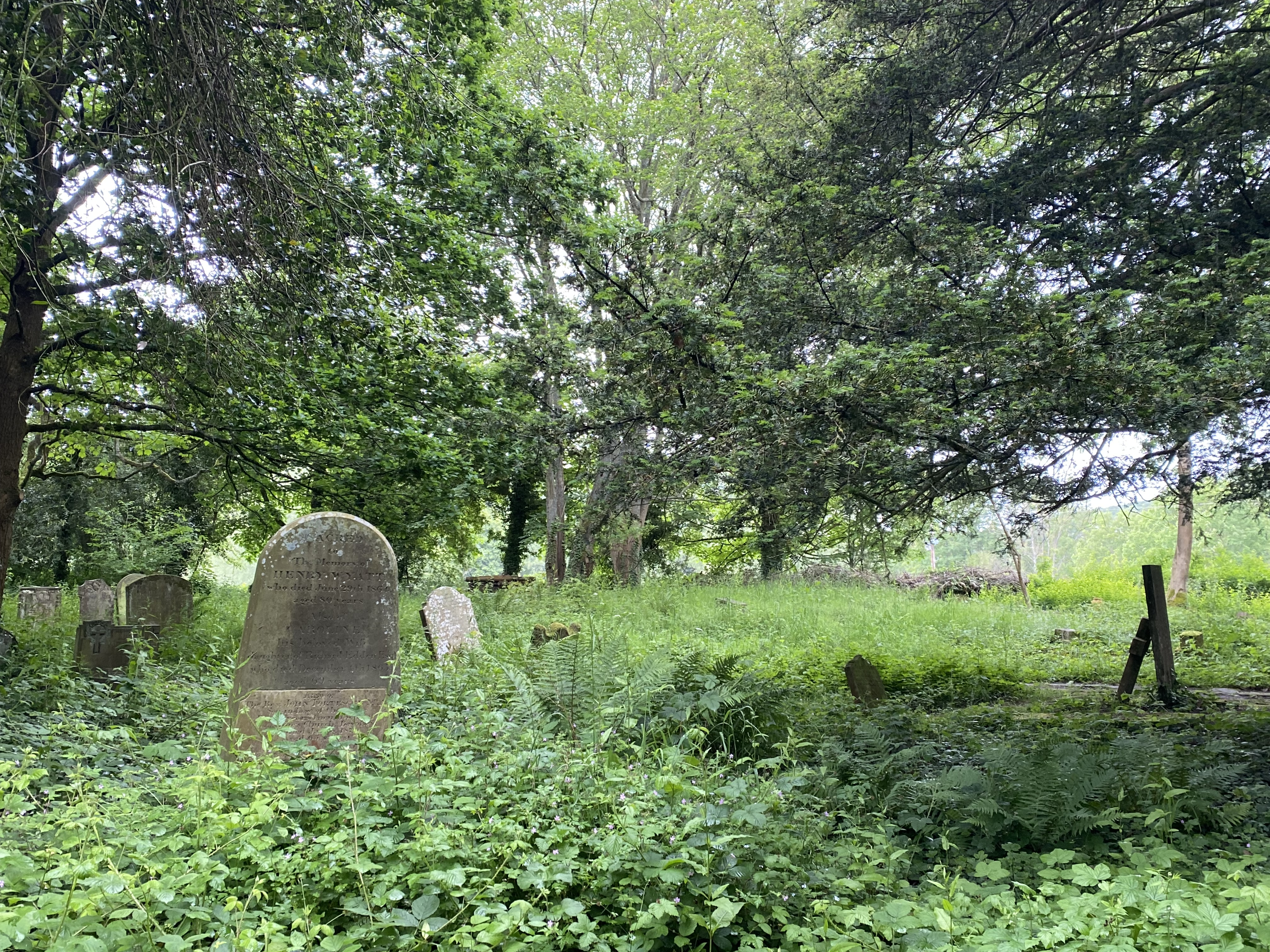
The graveyard of Dowles Church, facing towards the site of the church.

Urban myth in Bewdley says that a woman named Susan Wowen is buried in the graveyard. She was alleged to be a witch in the 1600s. Her burial and continued presence in the graveyard are unverifiable, as the names on some of the surviving graves are illegible, though there are plenty that can still be read.

An example of a mortsafe remains in the graveyard. By the size, it is thought that the grave belongs to a child. This is unverifiable due to the lack of a headstone adjacent to the grave.
