= Dowles =

Hamlet in Worcestershire, England

Coordinates: 52.3857°N 2.3306°W

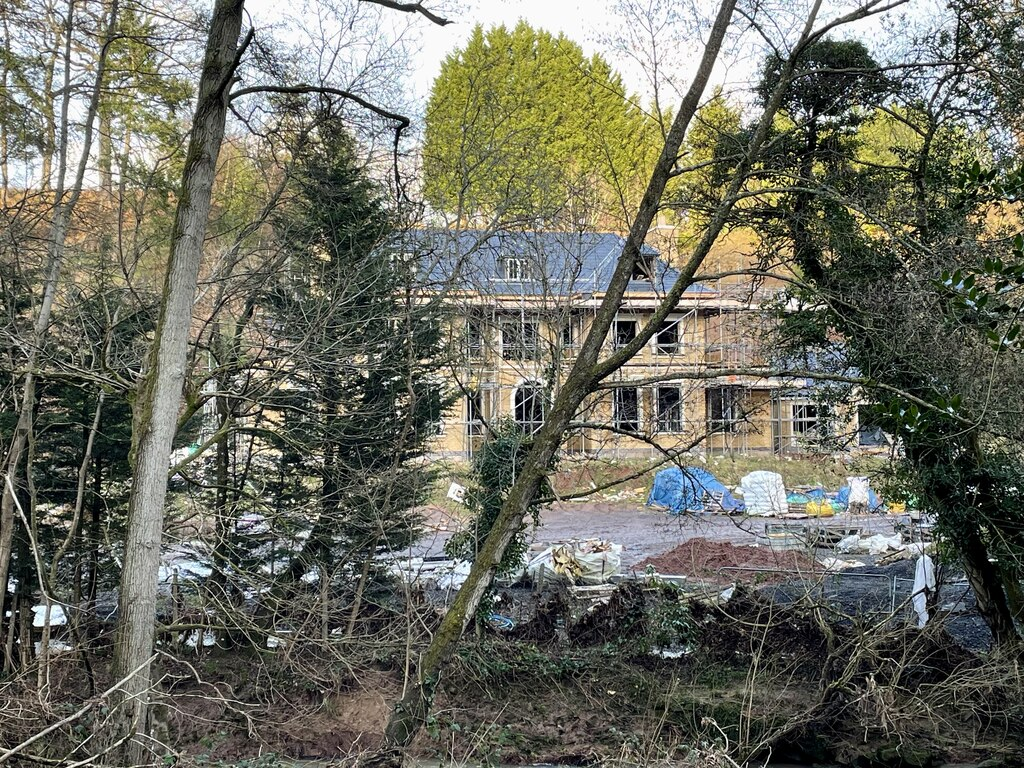
- Dowles Manor

- Location within Worcestershire
- Civil parish: Upper Arley
- District: Wyre Forest
- Shire county: Worcestershire
- Region: West Midlands
- Country: England
- Sovereign state: United Kingdom
- Police: West Mercia
- Fire: Hereford and Worcester
- Ambulance: West Midlands

Dowles is a hamlet in the civil parish of Upper Arley, in the Wyre Forest district, in the county of Worcestershire, England. It is about 3 miles from the town of Kidderminster. The parish was divided into two parts by the Severn.

== History ==
Dowles gets its name from Dowles Brook, which ran through the parish. It was transferred from Shropshire to Worcestershire on 30 September 1895. In 1931, the civil parish had a population of 113. On 1 April 1933, the parish was abolished and merged with Upper Arley, Kidderminster Foreign and Bewdley.

== Notable structures ==
- Dowles Manor, constructed c.1600. The Manor House within Dowles, owned the majority of the land.
- Dowles Church, a demolished church dedicated to Saint Andrew, of which only a graveyard and ruins of a Parish House remain. Built as part of Dowles Manor's estate on its historic land.
- Dowles Bridge, constructed c.1860 for the Severn Valley Railway across the River Severn, takes its name from the hamlet.
