= Wellington Steel Tube Co. Ltd. =

The Wellington Steel Tube. Co.Ltd was a family business mainly based on the borders of West Bromwich and Tipton, Staffordshire, England and which closed in 1971, a year after it was brought into public ownership as part of the British Steel Corporation. Owned by the Turner family - who also owned the Upper Arley estate in Worcestershire and created many in-jokes about Wellington there - it employed generations of Black Country people in hot rolled sections and tubes amongst other areas.

The site was later disposed of, being owned by Babcock International and other concerns, before in 1998 or 1999 being sold to Asda Stores. It now holds a superstore and petrol station. The site is officially called Wellington Park; and a canal bridge provided by Asda is marked as Wellington Bridge on maps.
