= Wyre Forest =

Large, semi-natural woodland in England

Coordinates: 52°23′6″N 2°22′7″W

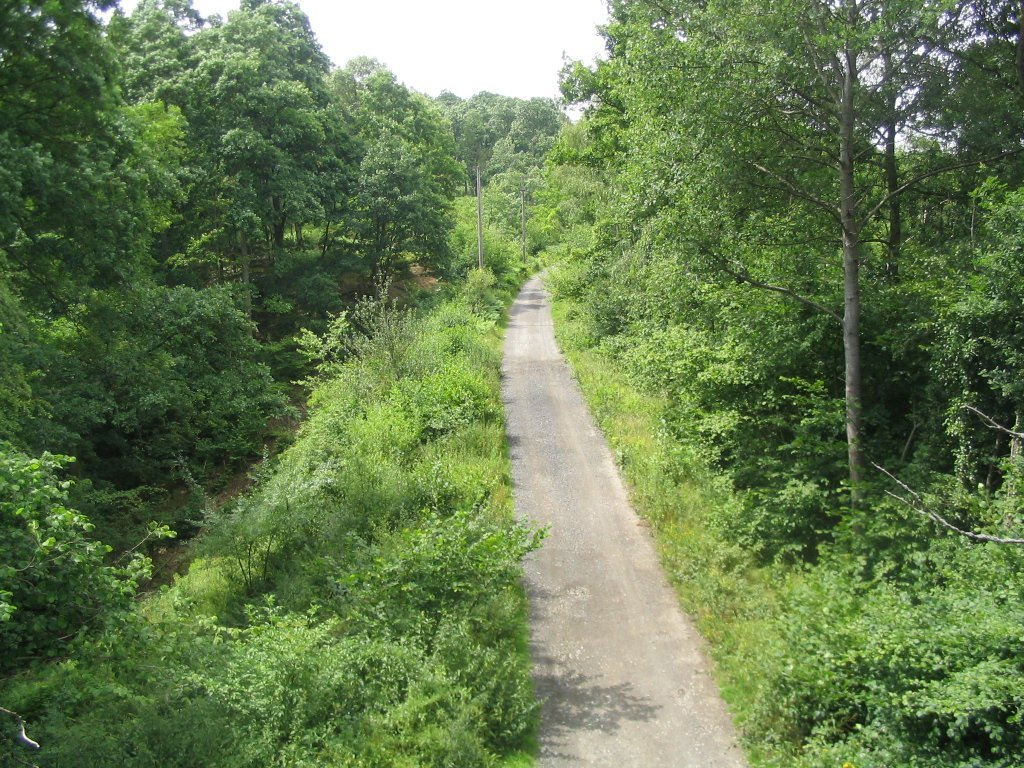
Path through the forest immediately north of Bewdley

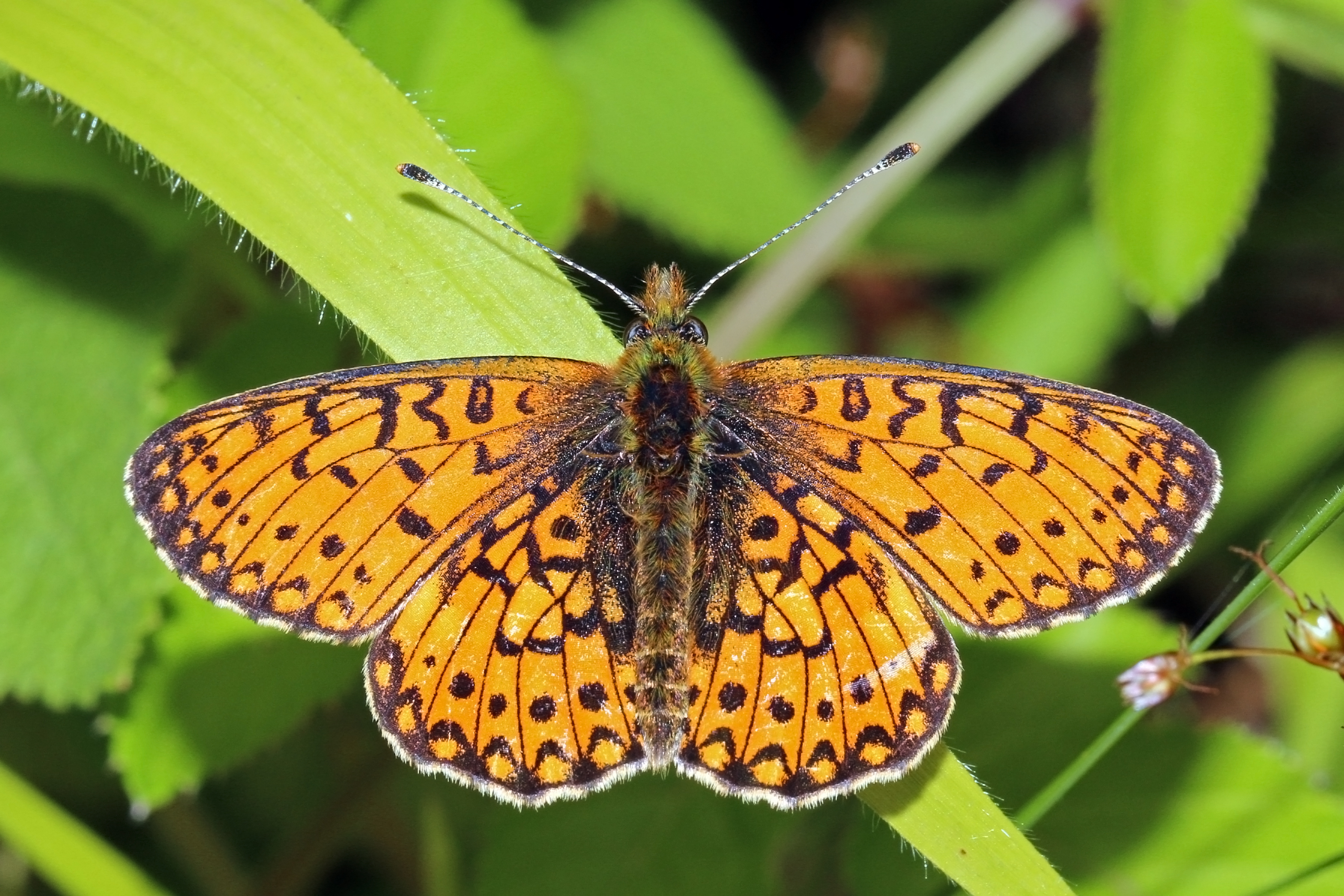
Small pearl-bordered fritillary (Boloria selene)

Wyre Forest /ˈwaɪər ˈfɒrɪst/ is a large, semi-natural (partially unmanaged) woodland and forest measuring 26.34 square kilometres (10.17 sq mi) which straddles the borders of Worcestershire and Shropshire, England. Knowles Mill, a former corn mill owned by the National Trust lies within the forest.

== Natural history ==
The forest covers an area in local terms of 2,634 hectares (6,509 acres, 26.34 square kilometres (10.17 sq mi)) and is noted for its variety of wildlife. Although now the Wyre Forest has been much deforested, it still extends from east of the A442 at Shatterford, north of Kidderminster in the east, almost to Cleobury Mortimer in the west and from Upper Arley in the north to Areley Kings, near Stourport in the south. It is one of the largest remaining ancient woodlands in Britain. Forestry England looks after around half of today's forest. Around two-thirds of the forest has been designated as an SSSI (1,753.7 Ha), while a further fifth (549 Ha) is listed as a national nature reserve. Dowles Brook flows through the heart of the forest, and the A456 road also runs through the southern edge of the woodland.

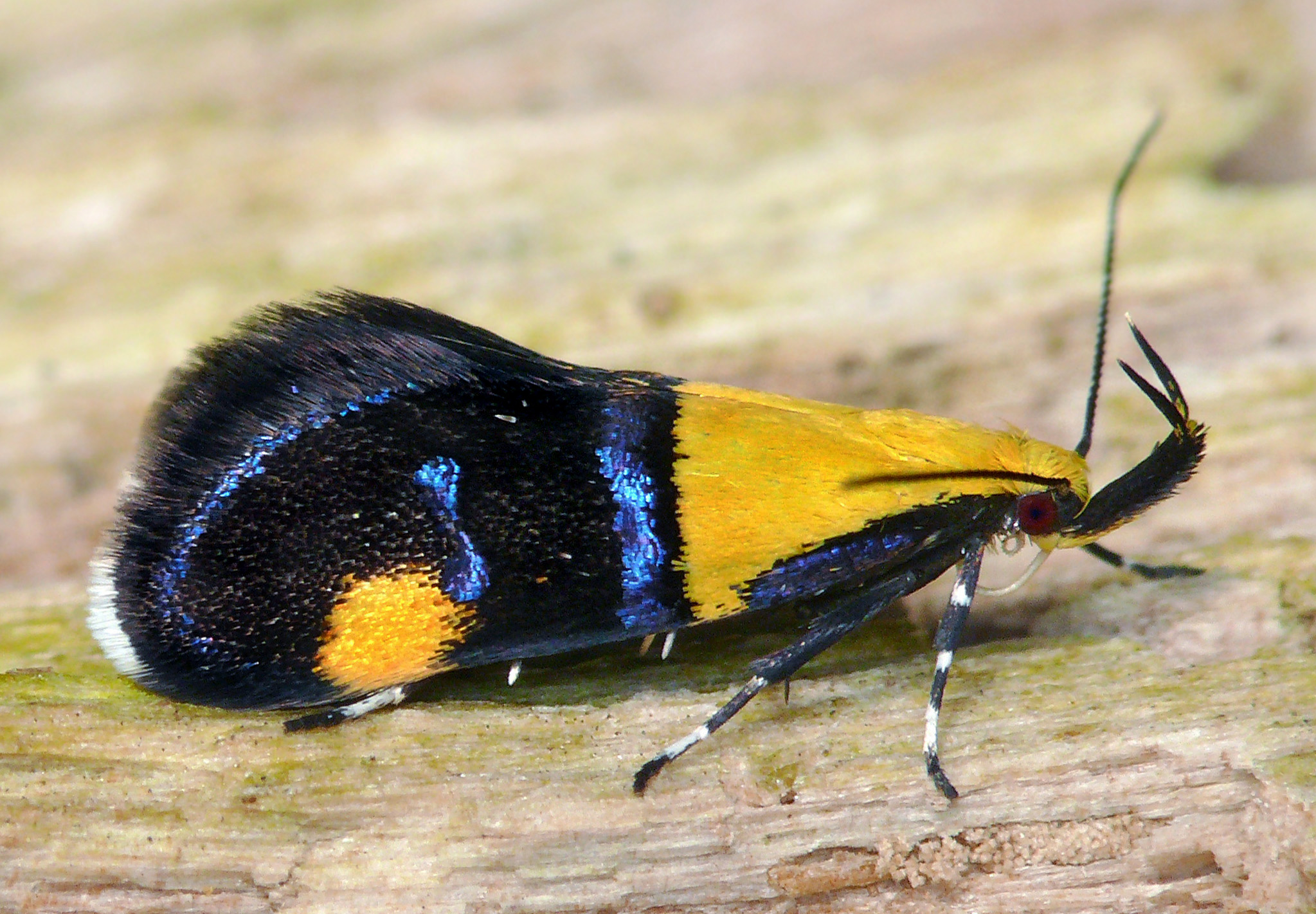
Oecophora bractella in Wyre Forest

It is one of the largest areas of semi-natural (partially unmanaged) woodland in the UK. Bird species to be found in the forest include hawfinch, dipper, wood warbler, common crossbill, spotted flycatcher, pied flycatcher, common redstart and long-eared owl, among many other woodland animals and plants. The small but colourful moth Oecophora bractella has one of its few English populations here, and does not seem to occur much further northwards.

The forest's adders have been the subject of a notable study by Sylvia Sheldon.

On 9 April 2024, a family of 6 Eurasian Beavers (Castor Fiber) were reintroduced to a tributary of Dowles Brook, within a five-hectare enclosure spanning the stream and surrounding woodland.

== History ==
The historic extent of the Wyre Forest is debatable. It is thought that it once stretched from Worcester to Bridgnorth along the west bank of the River Severn, but evidence for that is thin. Wyre Forest has none of the legal peculiarities of a historic forest at all, instead has those of a chase (of common land) with hunting rights belonging to the Mortimer family, who had the title Earl of March from 1328, as holders for centuries of the manor and liberty of Cleobury Mortimer, which technically still enjoys such hunting rights.

How far north the Mortimer family's hunting rights extended is debatable, but it may have included the whole area in south east Shropshire of which they were overlords at the time of Domesday Book. While they may have had hunting rights there, much of the woodland in fact belonged to other manors, such as Upper Arley and Kinlet. A large tract of woodland on the north side of the Dowles Brook was Kingswood, a detached township of the parish of Stottesdon. The town of Bewdley, a Mortimer foundation, may have been cut out of the forest. Far Forest was until recent times part of the borough of Bewdley, though separated from the rest of it by New Parks, which were in Rock parish. Most rights to land in the forest belonged to these medieval manors.

The rights of the Mortimer family passed to the crown as a result of the accession of Edward IV, who was (amongst other things) previously Earl of March to the crown. Its description as 'forest' probably dates from that period.

The extent of woodland two to three centuries ago was probably similar to that today. The manor of Cleobury Mortimer was alienated in the 16th century, leaving the crown only with the manor of Bewdley and Far Forest. Historical references to the Wyre Forest in this period seem to relate to this rather smaller area owned by the crown. In fact the crown's involvement was slight as its rights were leased to local gentlemen. One series of leases related to the manor of Bewdley, but another concerned something called the 'Wyre Forest'. This may have related to Far Forest, but that is not clear. During the 16th century, coal mining throughout the Wyre was prevalent. Industry in the Wyre Forest continued throughout the 17th and 18th centuries. During those centuries, the forest was intensively managed as coppice to provide cordwood for the production of charcoal. The charcoal was used to fuel iron forges at Cleobury Mortimer, and at Wilden and elsewhere in the Stour valley. These supplied iron from manufacture into finished iron goods mainly in the Black Country. Coppicing in the Wyre also provided industry to towns such as Bewdley, where local Tanneries profited from the woodland. Charcoal burning continued into the 20th century.

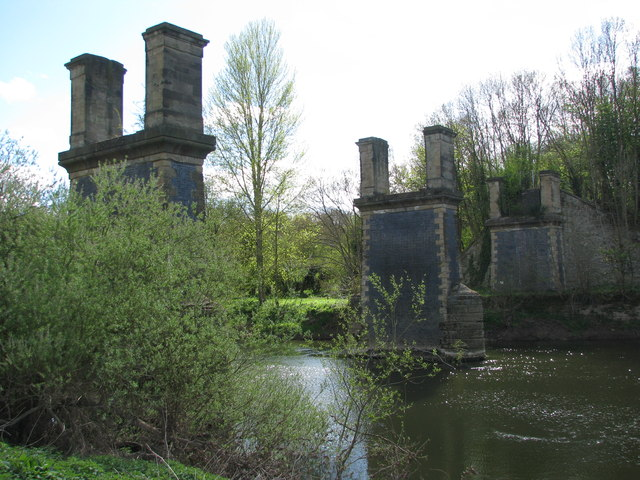
The remains of Dowles railway Bridge

A branch of the Severn Valley Railway, known as the Tenbury and Bewdley Railway once ran through the Wyre Forest. It branched from the main line north of Bewdley station and crossed the River Severn at Dowles Bridge, the supports of which still remain. The trackbed of the railway now forms part of National Cycle Route 45.

== Knowles Mill ==
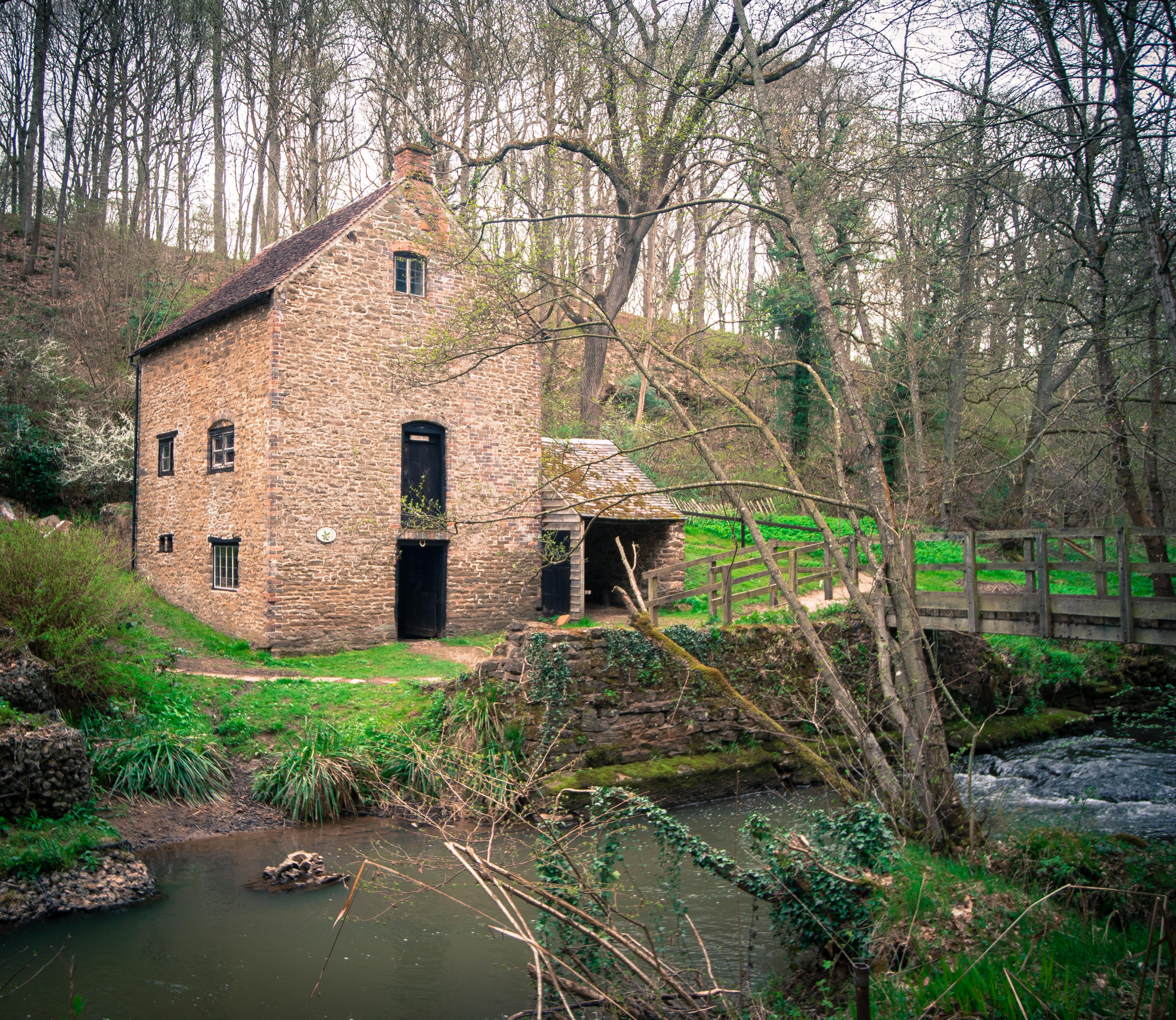
Knowles Mill

One of nine possible mills that historically worked on Dowles Brook, Knowles Mill was built in the eighteenth century, and was later modified in the nineteenth century. The surviving building is two storeys high and the site also preserves an overshot mill wheel made of iron and a great spur wheel, alongside other remnant machinery. The first record of a mill on the site dates to 1757 when it was listed as for sale in a local newspaper. The mill and its surroundings are owned by the National Trust.

== Namesake ==
The Wyre Forest District of Worcestershire, containing the towns Kidderminster, Bewdley and Stourport on Severn, takes its name from the forest. However, just over half the woodland is not in the district, and instead is in Shropshire, to the north.

== See also ==
- Ancient woodland
