= Dowles Brook =

Stream in Shropshire and Worcestershire, England

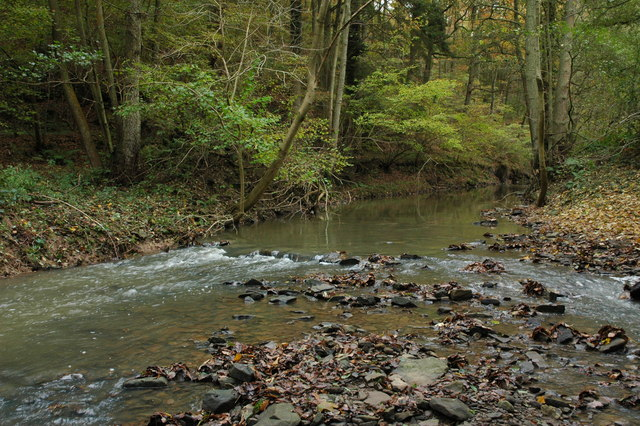
- Dowles Brook within the Wyre Forest

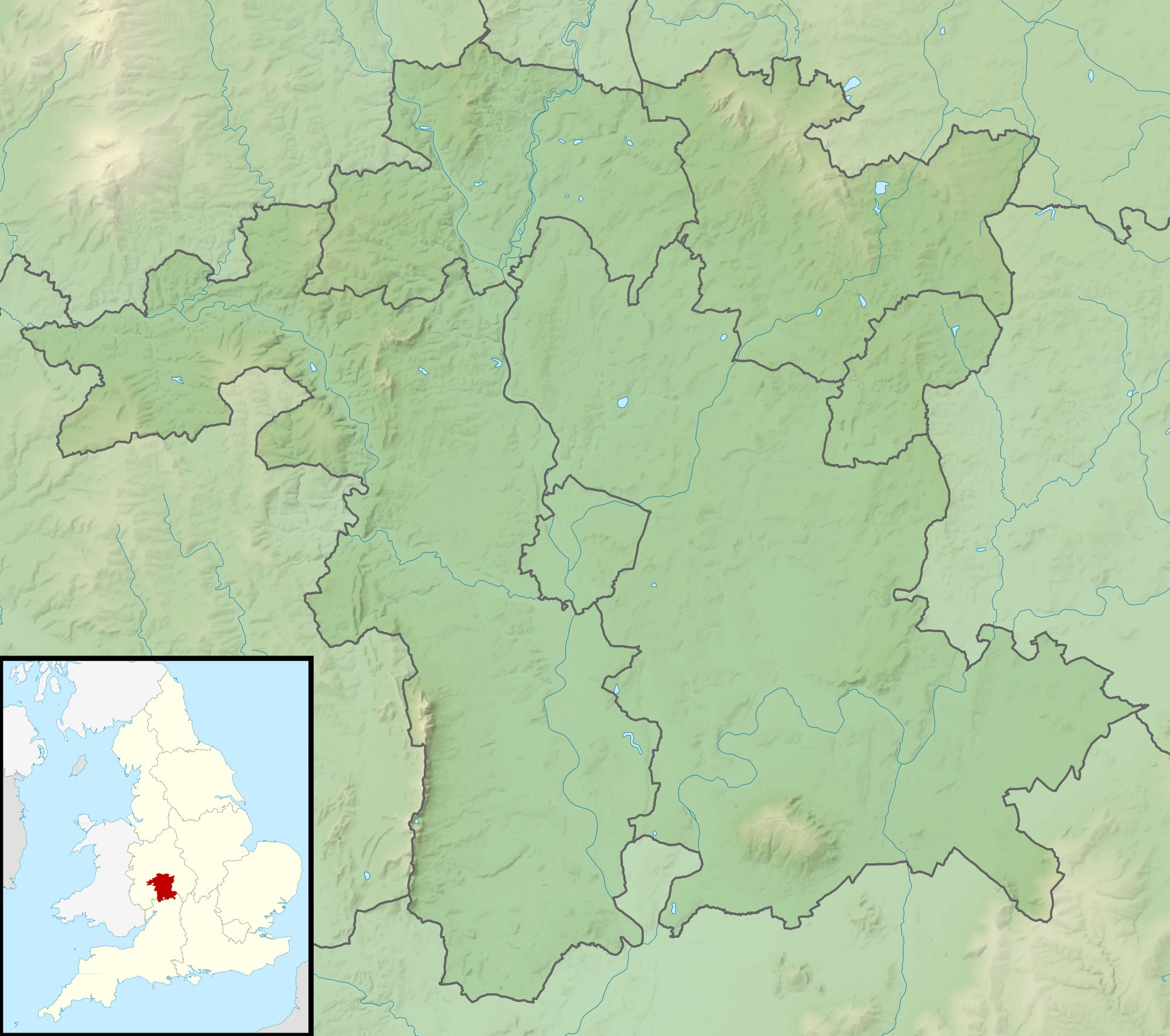
- Location within Worcestershire

Location
- Country: England
- Counties: Shropshire, Worcestershire

Physical characteristics
- Source
  - location: Bagginswood, Shropshire
- Mouth
  - location: River Severn, Worcestershire
  - coordinates: 52°23′06″N 2°19′29″W
- Length: 15.5 km (9.6 mi)
- Basin size: 46.2 km^{2} (17.8 sq mi)

Dowles Brook flows through the heart of the Wyre Forest, into the former civil parish of Dowles (from which it gets its name) and into the River Severn.

== History ==
In 1902, ornithologist and naturalist Jannion Steele Elliott purchased the Elizabethan era building Dowles Manor, near the confluence of Dowles Brook into the Severn. By the time of his death, in 1942, he had bought up the surrounding land, piecemeal, until he owned the portion of the valley, formed by the Dowles Brook, surrounding Dowles Manor; he maintained this land as a nature reserve.

== Conservation ==
During the summer of 2012, with funding from the Environment Agency, the Worcestershire Wildlife Trust attempted an ambitious project to eradicate the invasive Himalayan Balsam from a 3 km watercourse, hoping to improve biodiversity and reduce soil erosion. A pilot project was carried out on the Lem Brook, a tributary of the Dowles Brook. This was a success. However, as the seeds persist in the soil for up to two years: repeat eradication was planned for 2014 followed by close monitoring.

Beavers had been hunted to extinction in the Wyre Forest area during the 16th century. To reverse this, in April 2024, a population of 6 Eurasian Beavers (two adults and four kits) were reintroduced to an enclosure on a tributary of Dowles Brook, marking a key point in conservation and reintroduction of native species to the area.
