= Patty Stair =

Composer and organist

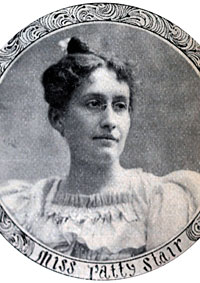
Patty Stair

Patty Stair (November 12, 1869 – April 26, 1926) was an American organist and composer.

== Biography ==
Patty Stair was born in Cleveland, Ohio, the niece of tenor Edwin Stair. She studied with music teachers including Franklin Bassett and at Hathaway Brown school for girls. She taught organ at the Cleveland Conservatory of Music from about 1889 to 1921 and served as organist for several churches in the Cleveland area.

She was the first woman member and served as dean of the Ohio Chapter of the American Guild of Organists, and directed the chorus of the Forthnightly Musical Club. She also served as president of the Women's Music Teachers association of Cleveland.

Stair never married, and died of pneumonia in Cleveland in 1926. Later that year as part of Cleveland Music Week celebrations, along with other recently deceased Cleveland musicians Johann Beck and Fanny Snow Knowlton, she was honored with a prominent exhibit at the Cleveland Public Library.

== Works ==
Stair composed for orchestra, songs and sacred anthems, and produced two light operas. Selected works include:

- Intermezzo for orchestra
- Six songs ("If I could take your tears, love," "Madrigal," "Love song," "When daisies bloom," Daphne’s cheeks," "Slumber song")
- All my Heart this Night rejoices, Christmas anthem
- Art thou weary, Sacred Duet for Soprano and Tenor, words by J.M. Neale
- Berceuse for violin and P.F., 1908
- Calm on the listening Ear of Night, Christmas Anthem, words by E.H. Sears
- Christ beneath Thy Cross, Anthem, 1915
- Christmas Cradle Song, For mixed voices and Organ, with Violin ad libitum, words by M. Luther
- Come, ye Faithful, Hymn-Anthem for Easter, 1908
- Evening Hymn, Softly now the Light of Day, Anthem for mixed voices, 1907
- A Folk-Tale, for violin and P.F., 1908
- Hark, what mean those holy Voices ... Anthem for mixed Quartet, 1902
- I have longed for Thy Salvation, anthem, 1913
- It is a good Thing to give Thanks ... anthem, 1913
- Little Dutch Lullaby, chorus for women's voices, 1905
- Now the Day is Over, hymn-anthem for women's or children's a capella voices
