= Yellowware =

Type of earthenware

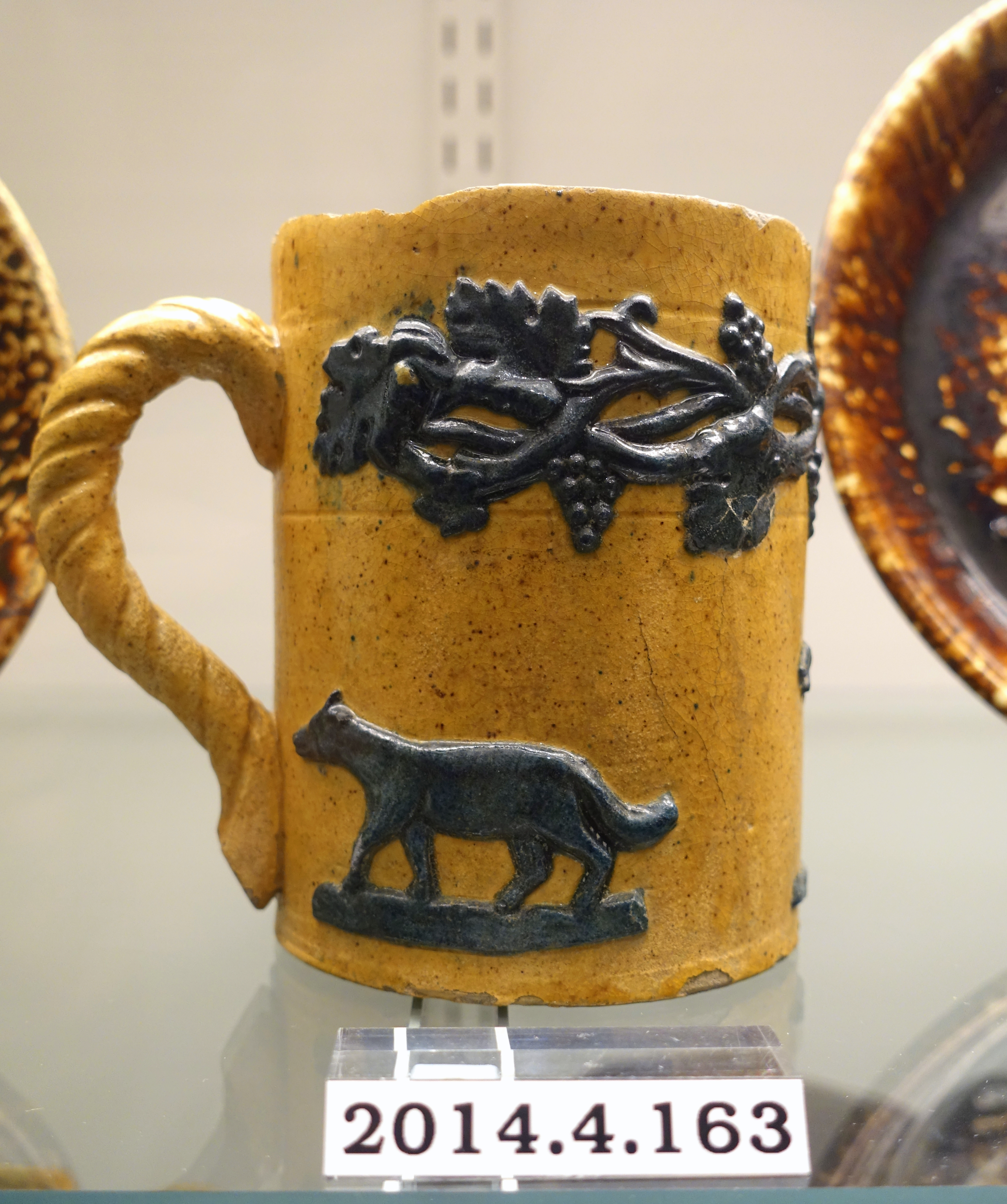
Mug, probably American, 1870-1890, lead-glazed yellowware, blue sprigged clay

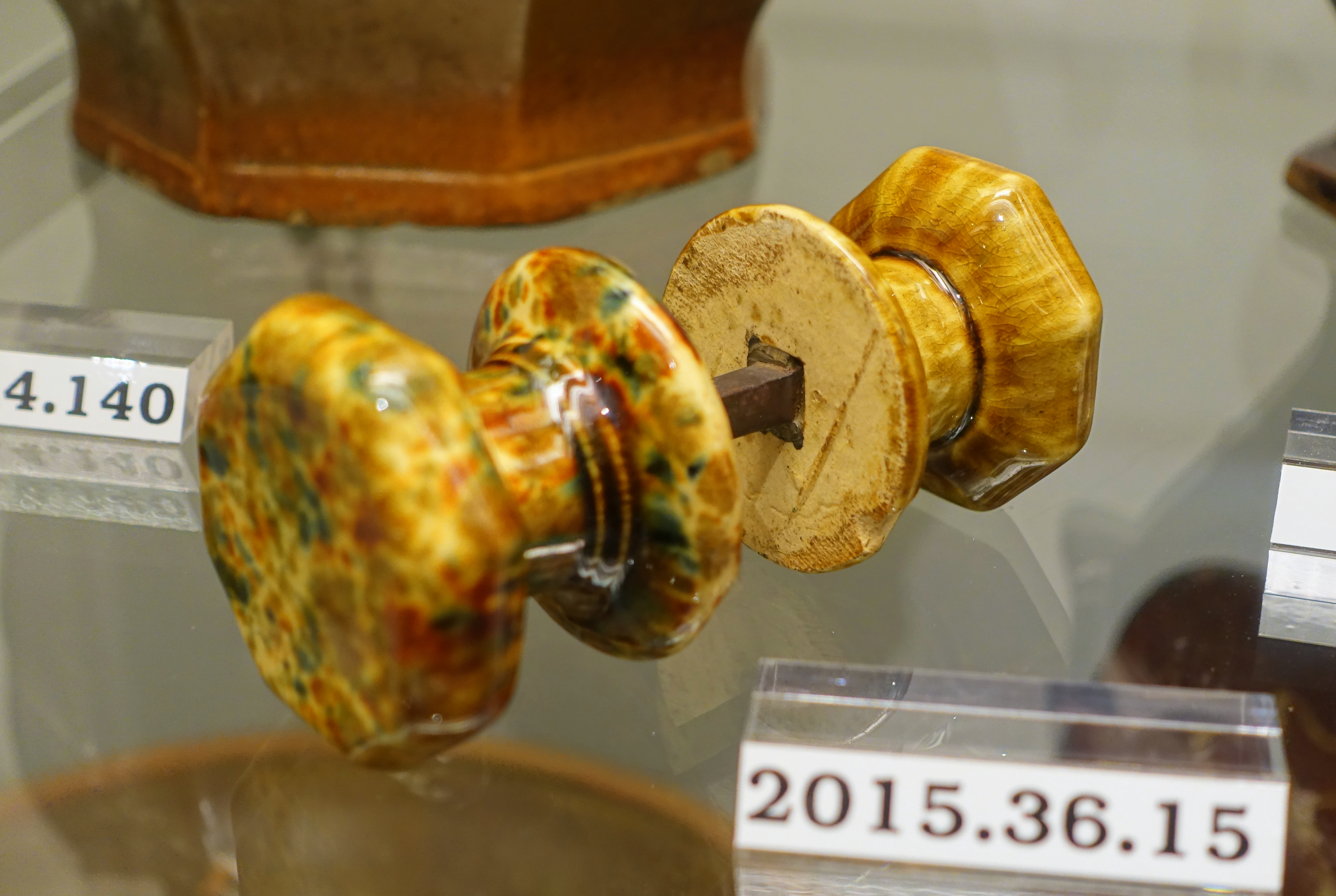
Doorknobs, Lyman, Fenton, & Co., Bennington VT, c. 1852, lead-glazed yellow earthenware, Rockingham glaze

Yellowware, or yellow ware, is a type of earthenware named after its yellow appearance given to it by the clay used for its production. Originating in the United Kingdom in the late 18th century, it was also produced in the eastern United States from the late 1820s.

== History ==
Colonists settling in the United States brought European pottery techniques with them. They were limited by the materials available to them, however, and colonial ceramic production was limited to redware and stoneware, with occasional attempts to produce creamware and porcelain.

Beginning in the late 18th century, potters in Scotland and northern England began manufacturing vessels of yellow-firing clay. The trade spread to Wales. A fragment of yellowware pancheon was excavated from Knowles Mill in Worcestershire. By the early 19th century, potters skilled in yellowware manufacture began to emigrate to the United States.

In the United States, production centered on New Jersey, Pennsylvania, Maryland, New England and Ohio. The earliest documented American yellowware was in 1797, with large-scale production starting in 1828 in New Jersey.

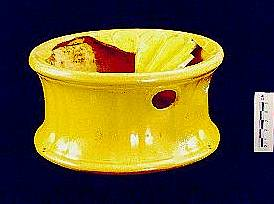
An early American yellowware spittoon, an artefact recovered from a site in New York City

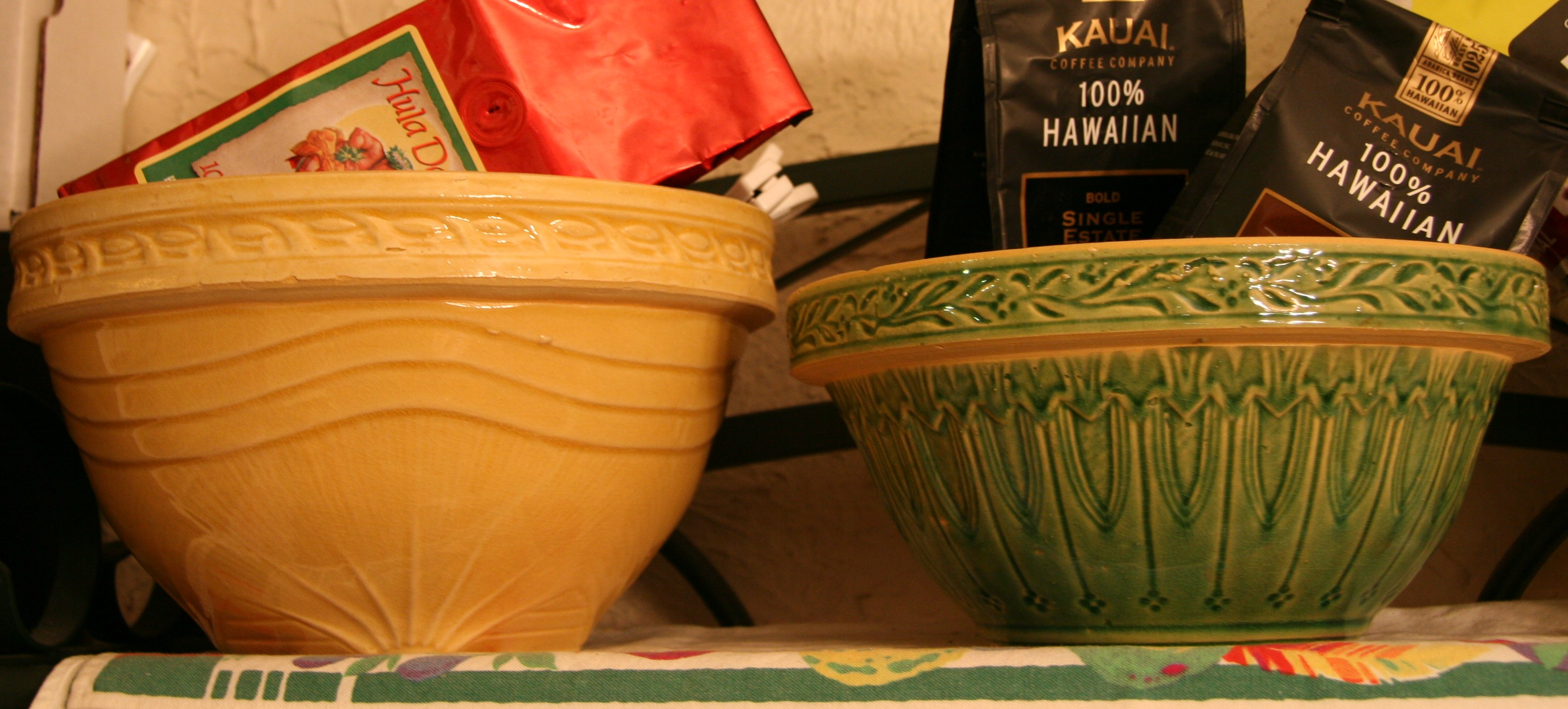
A pair of vintage yellowware kitchen mixing bowls, one with a green glaze

East Liverpool, Ohio, was the manufacturing base of much of the yellowware used in the United States during the mid- to late 19th century. It has been estimated that "between 1865 and 1885, Ohio alone produced half of America's yellowware".

By the early 20th century, yellowware was no longer fashionable.

=== Dating ===
General dates for yellowware in the United States are 1828 to c. 1930. Few wares are marked, but those marks that do exist are well-represented in the literature. Closer dating for unmarked pieces is possible through vessel form and decoration.

== Similar wares ==
Several varieties of Native American pottery manufactured in the American Southwest have been grouped together by scholars as Jeddito Yellow Ware. These were coil-built forms, usually bowls or ladles with a variety of decoration made in Hopi villages from the Pueblo IV period to historic times (c. A.D. 1300 to present). These wares are quite distinctive, and are unlikely to be confused with yellowware, either in appearance, or through recovery in the same contexts.

Rockingham ware was named after the Marchioness of Rockingham in the early 19th century, and the name was then used as a marketing term in the United States. Not all Rockingham ware was made using yellowware clay, and to distinguish it from other types of yellowware some collectors and antiquarians use the term "brown-glazed yellowware". Archaeologists usually refer to the American product, and British wares that did not originate at the Rockingham works, as "Rockingham-type" wares. Though it shares characteristics of its body with yellowware, and was thrown in many of the same potteries, Rockingham, or Rockingham-type ware is considered a different product from yellowware due to its distinctive brown glaze, often mottled.

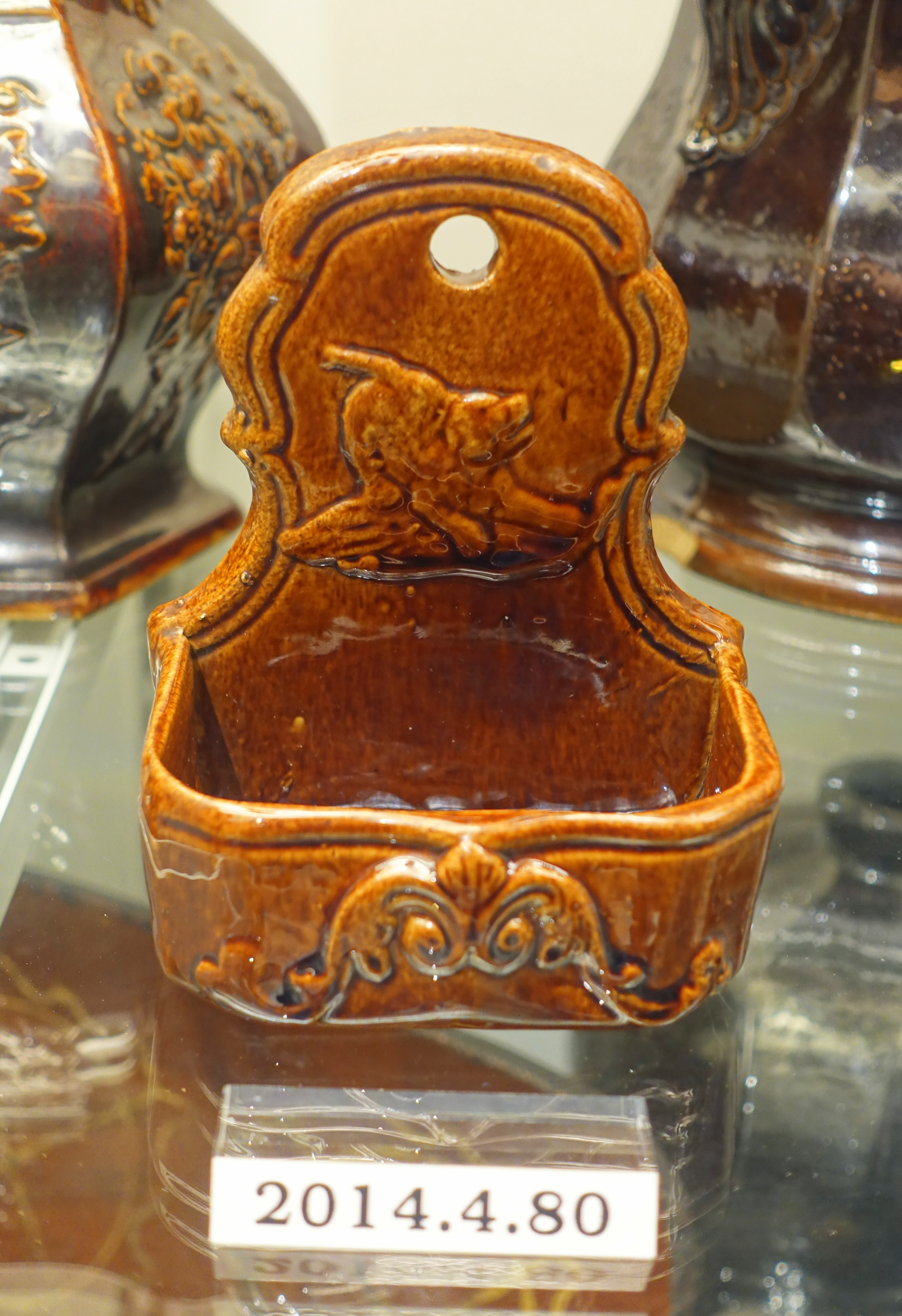
Match holder, John E. Jeffords & Co. Philadelphia City Pottery, c. 1870, lead-glazed yellow earthenware, Rockingham glaze

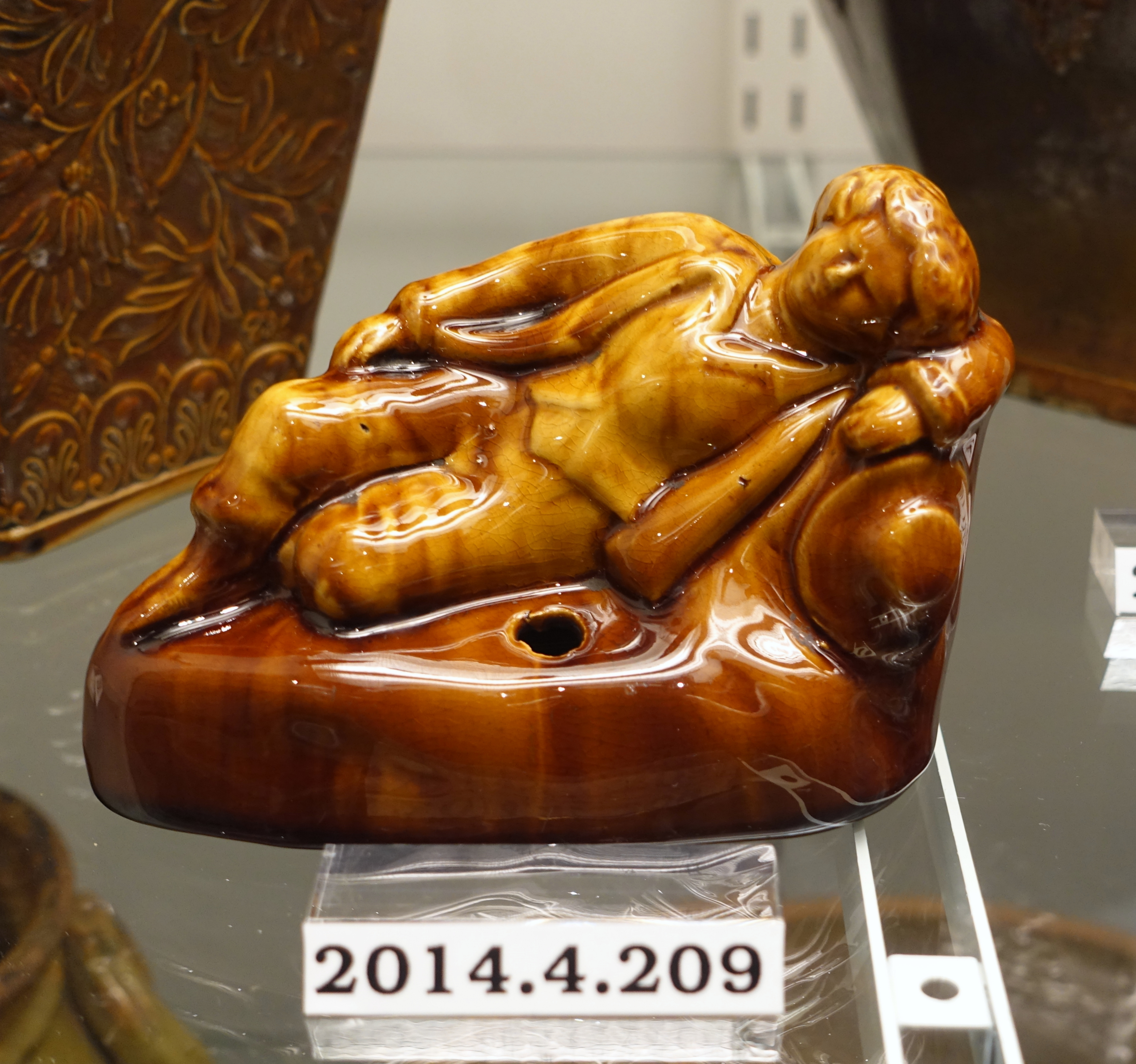
Inkwell, American or English, yellow earthenware, Rockingham glaze

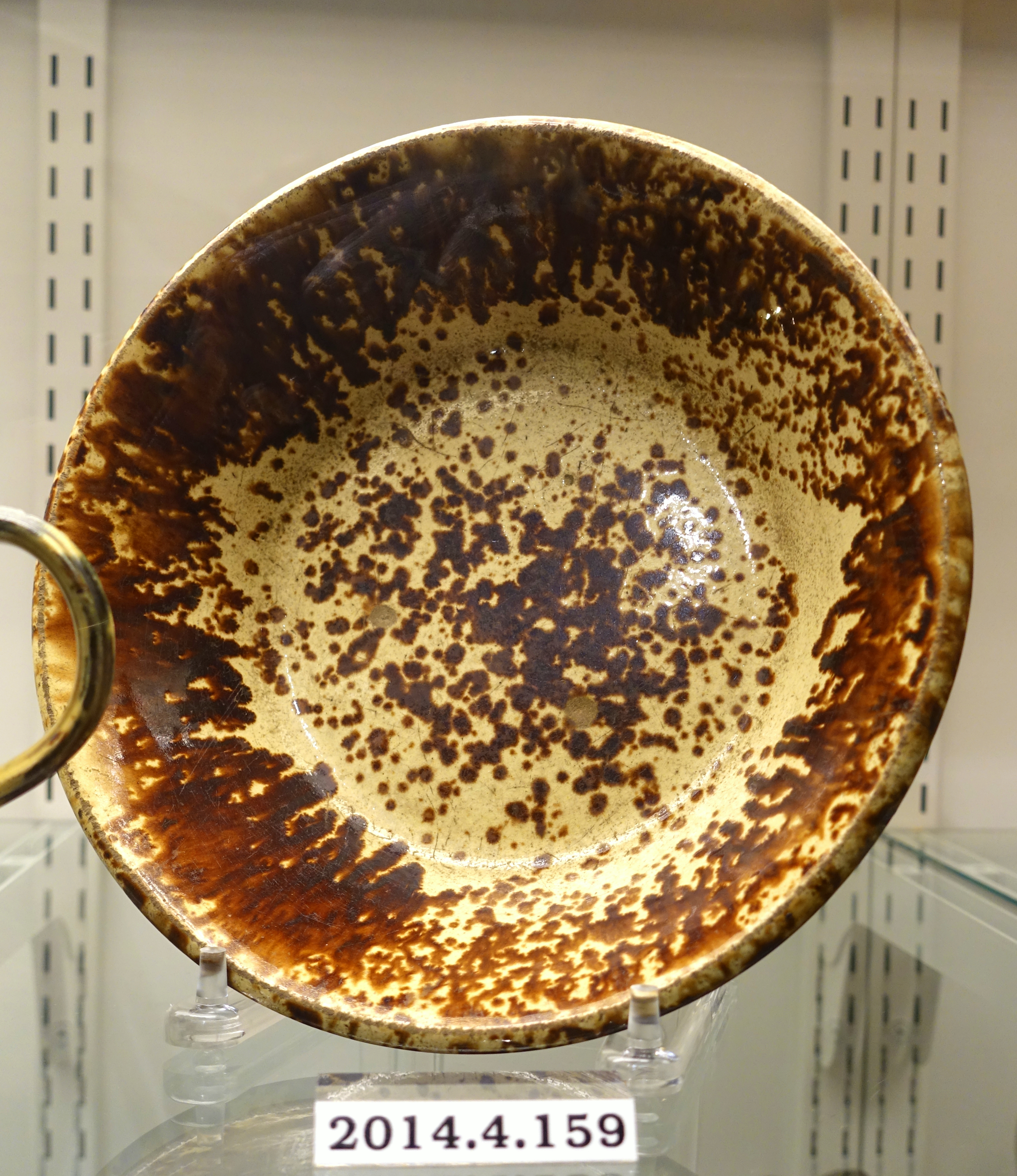
Pudding dish, Boston Earthenware Manufacturing Company, c. 1860, lead-glazed yellow earthenware, Rockingham glaze

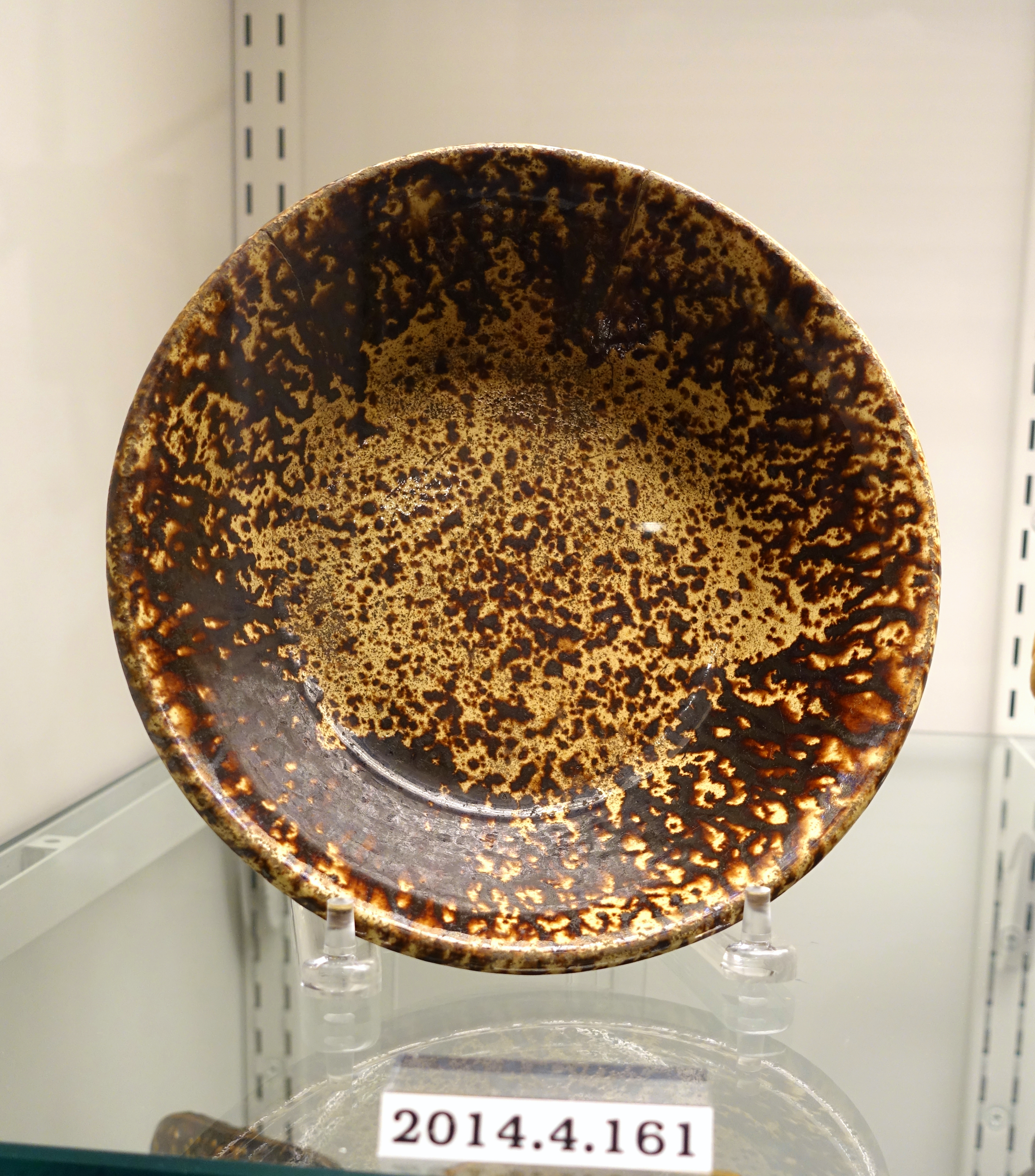
Bowl, Boston Earthenware Manufacturing Company, Massachusetts, c. 1860, lead-glazed yellow earthenware, Rockingham glaze
