= Upper Arley =

Village in Worcestershire, England

Coordinates: 52.42198°N 2.34699°W

Arley and Upper Arley
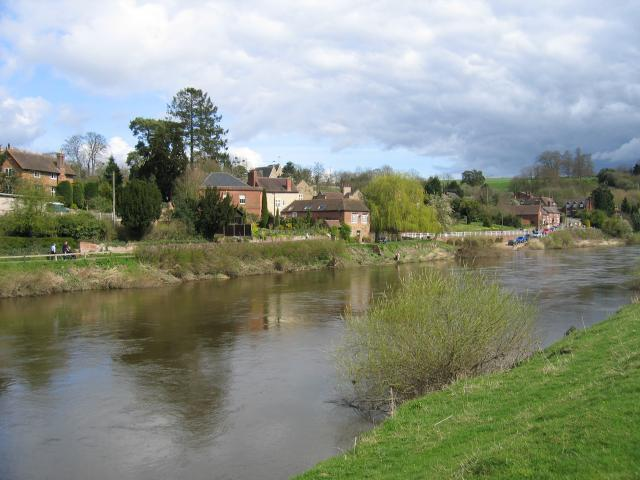
- Upper Arley village and the River Severn

- Location within Worcestershire
- Area: 17.08 km^{2} (6.59 sq mi)
- Population: 767 (2021)
  - Density: 45/km^{2} (120/sq mi)
- OS grid reference: SO765805
- District: Wyre Forest
- Shire county: Worcestershire
- Region: West Midlands
- Country: England
- Sovereign state: United Kingdom
- Post town: BEWDLEY
- Postcode district: DY12
- Dialling code: 01299
- Police: West Mercia
- Fire: Hereford and Worcester
- Ambulance: West Midlands

Upper Arley (grid reference SO765805) is a village and civil parish near Kidderminster in the Wyre Forest District of Worcestershire, England. Historically part of Staffordshire, the parish had a population of 767 at the 2021 census.

== History ==
The name Arley derives from the Old English earnlēah meaning 'eagle wood/clearing'.

Upper Arley used to be in Staffordshire, but was transferred to Worcestershire in 1895. The parish is unusual in being divided into two unequal parts by the river Severn. Woodeaves (west of the river) was only linked to the rest of the parish by a foot ferry, which was replaced in 1972 by a footbridge.

The manor of Upper Arley had various owners before 1276, when it was bought by Roger de Mortimer in 1276. It passed down his family, who held the title Earl of March until 1448 when Richard Plantagenet, 3rd Duke of York sold it. It was bought by William Burley, whose daughter Joan married Thomas Lyttleton, whose descendants (spelling their name Lyttelton) also owned Hagley Hall and became Barons Lyttelton until the death of Thomas Lyttelton, 2nd Baron Lyttelton in 1779, when it passed to his sister Lucy and her husband, Arthur Annesley, 8th Viscount Valentia, later Earl of Mountnorris. The manor was held by the Woodward family from 1853 to 1959. Captain Robert Woodward was killed in World War I in 1915. On the death of Sir Chad Woodward, on 2 February 1957, most of the estate was sold off for death duties. His widow continued to retain the rights and duties of the Lord of the Manor.

The village of Upper Arley was an estate village owned in the early 19th century by the Earls of Mountnorris and the heirs, the Viscounts Valentia, from whom the village's second (and now defunct) pub took its name. In the late 20th century, it was owned by the philanthropist and iron and steel tycoon Roger Turner, who bought the estate after selling his family's Staffordshire tubemaking businesses, called the Wellington Steel Tube Co. Ltd. There are a number of subtle references or in-jokes to this legacy on the estate — a large redwood tree of the Wellingtonia variety stands very much out-of-place at the entrance to the manor house of Arley House, as does one by the footbridge across the River Severn in the village; and the estate buildings, be they commercial or residential, are coloured green and cream, the corporate colours of the Wellington companies. By 2000 and the death of Roger Turner, part of his private park became Arley Arboretum, a partner garden of the Royal Horticultural Society which is open to the public. Symbolically, Turner lies buried in the churchyard and next to the gate leading to the Arboretum and Arley House.

== Amenities ==
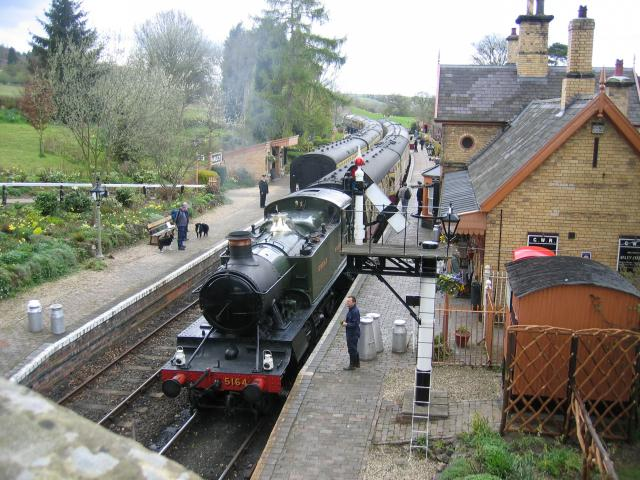
Arley Severn Valley Railway station

The Arley railway station, on the Severn Valley Railway, one of Britain's preserved steam railways, has been used in many films and television programmes (including the BBC's Oh, Doctor Beeching!). The station was opened in 1862 and closed by British Railways in 1963. It was reopened by the SVR in 1974.

The village also has one pub, a tearoom and a post office with shop.

Arley Tower, a Grade II listed castellated folly, is on Arley Lane close to the river Severn.
