= Clifton Park and Museum =

Park and museum in South Yorkshire, England

Clifton Park Museum
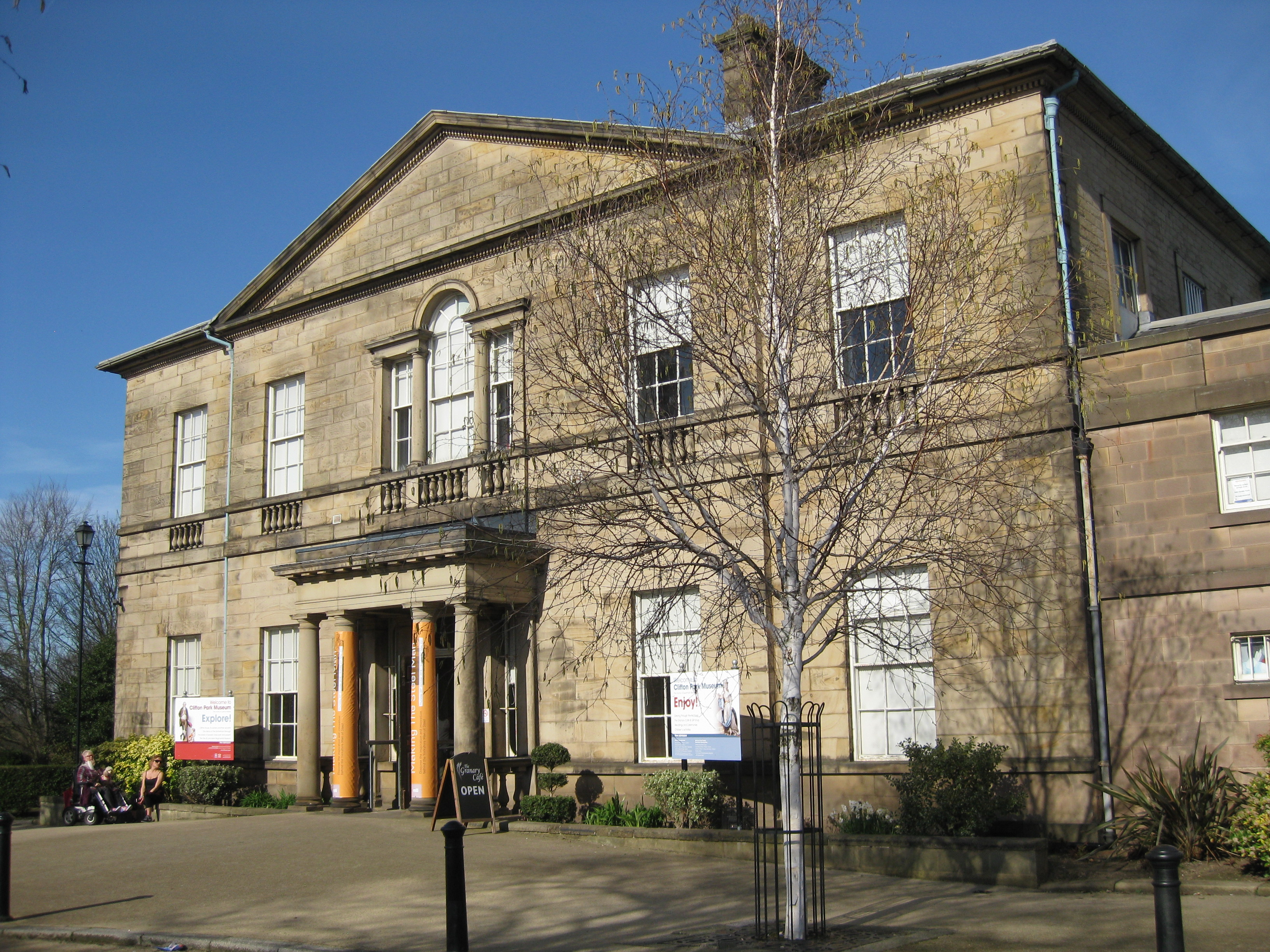
- Clifton Park Museum

- Shown in South Yorkshire
- Established: 1891
- Location: Rotherham, South Yorkshire
- Coordinates: 53.4296°N 1.3471°W
- Owner: Metropolitan Borough of Rotherham
- Website: cliftonpark.org.uk

Clifton Park and Museum is a city park and municipal museum located in Clifton Park, Rotherham, South Yorkshire, England. Clifton Park Museum is located in Clifton House and is one of several publicly owned museums and visitor attractions administered by the Metropolitan Borough of Rotherham. The house is the headquarters of Heritage Services, which also includes the York and Lancaster Regimental Museum and Archives and Local Studies. It is a Grade II* listed building. Clifton Park is a visitor attraction with facilities including a skate park, rockery, memorial park and children's play areas. It is also Grade II listed with Historic England.

== History ==
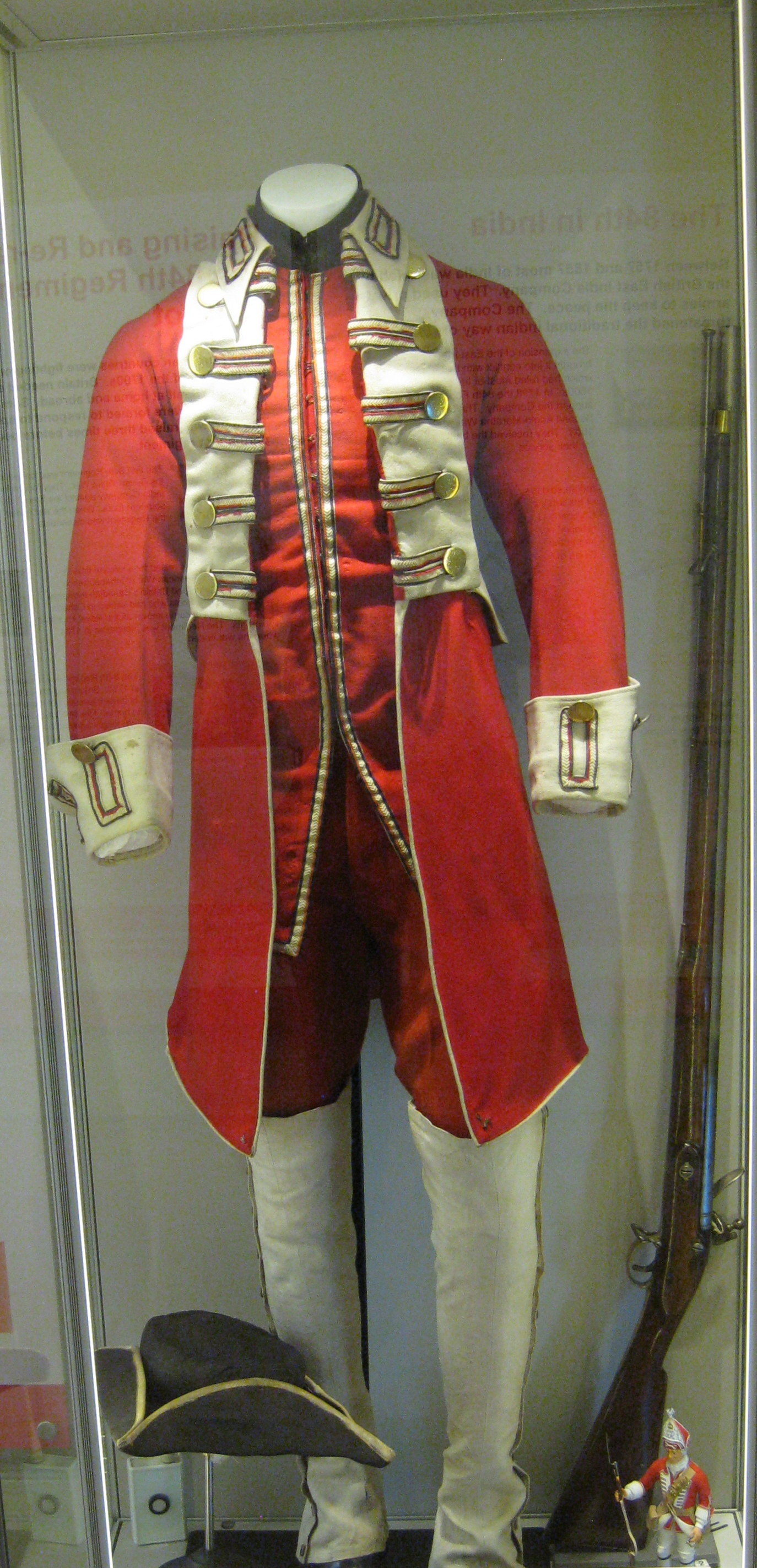
1758 soldier's uniform in the York and Lancaster Regimental Museum

Clifton House was designed by John Carr of York for Joshua Walker, an industrialist involved in the manufacture of iron and steel, and completed in 1784. The grounds of the house now comprising the park originally had walled gardens, pleasure grounds, and a fishpond, however they have mostly been lost due to later park changes. The house and park were purchased by the Municipal Borough of Rotherham in 1891 and the museum was first opened to the public later that year with the majority of its exhibits loaned by local people. It was administered by the Borough Librarian with a succession of honorary curators until the 1970s. In 1974 the soot blackened stonework was cleaned and the museum building was extended when a roof was placed over the original open courtyard.

== Clifton Park Museum ==
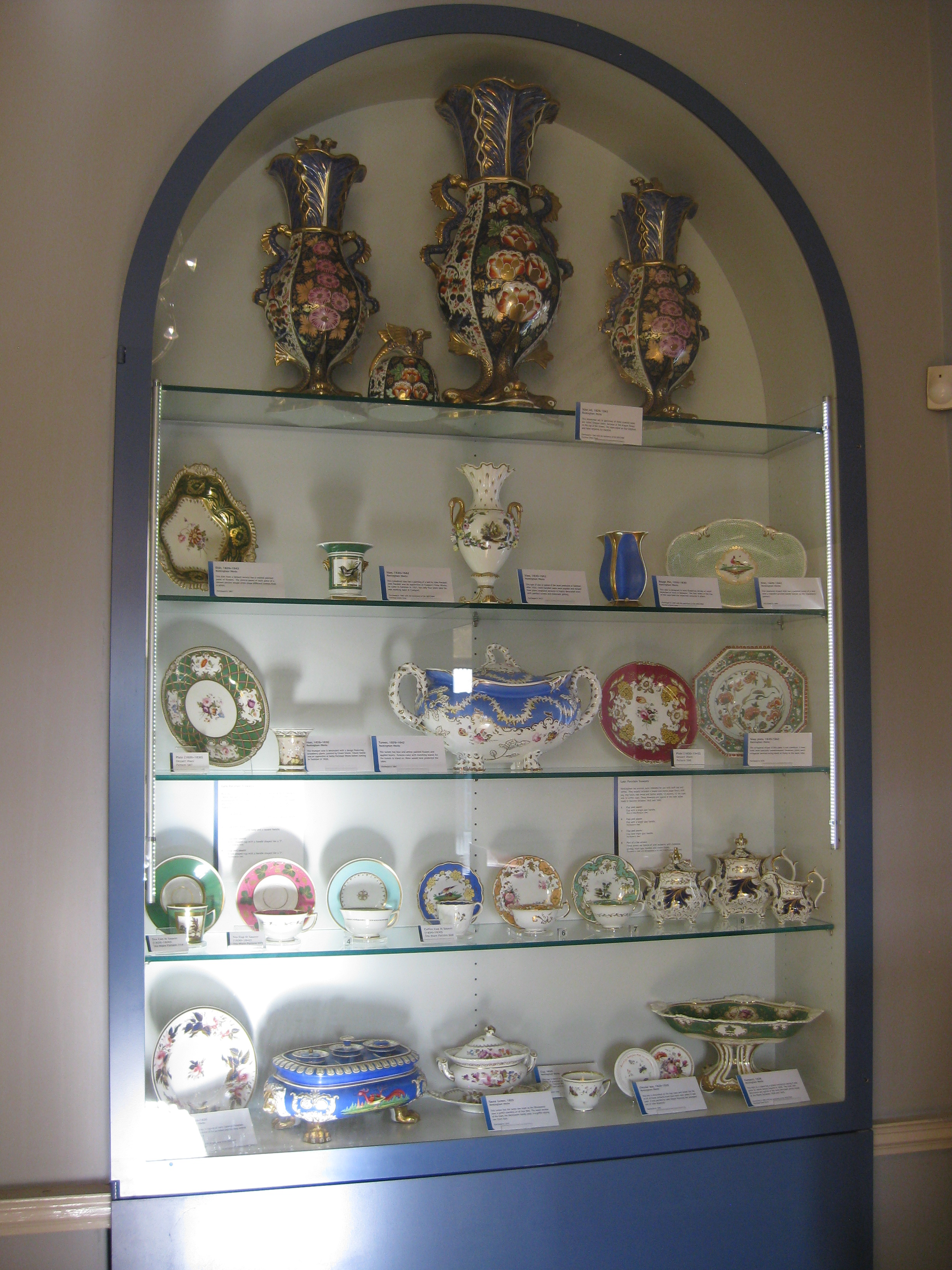
Rockingham Pottery

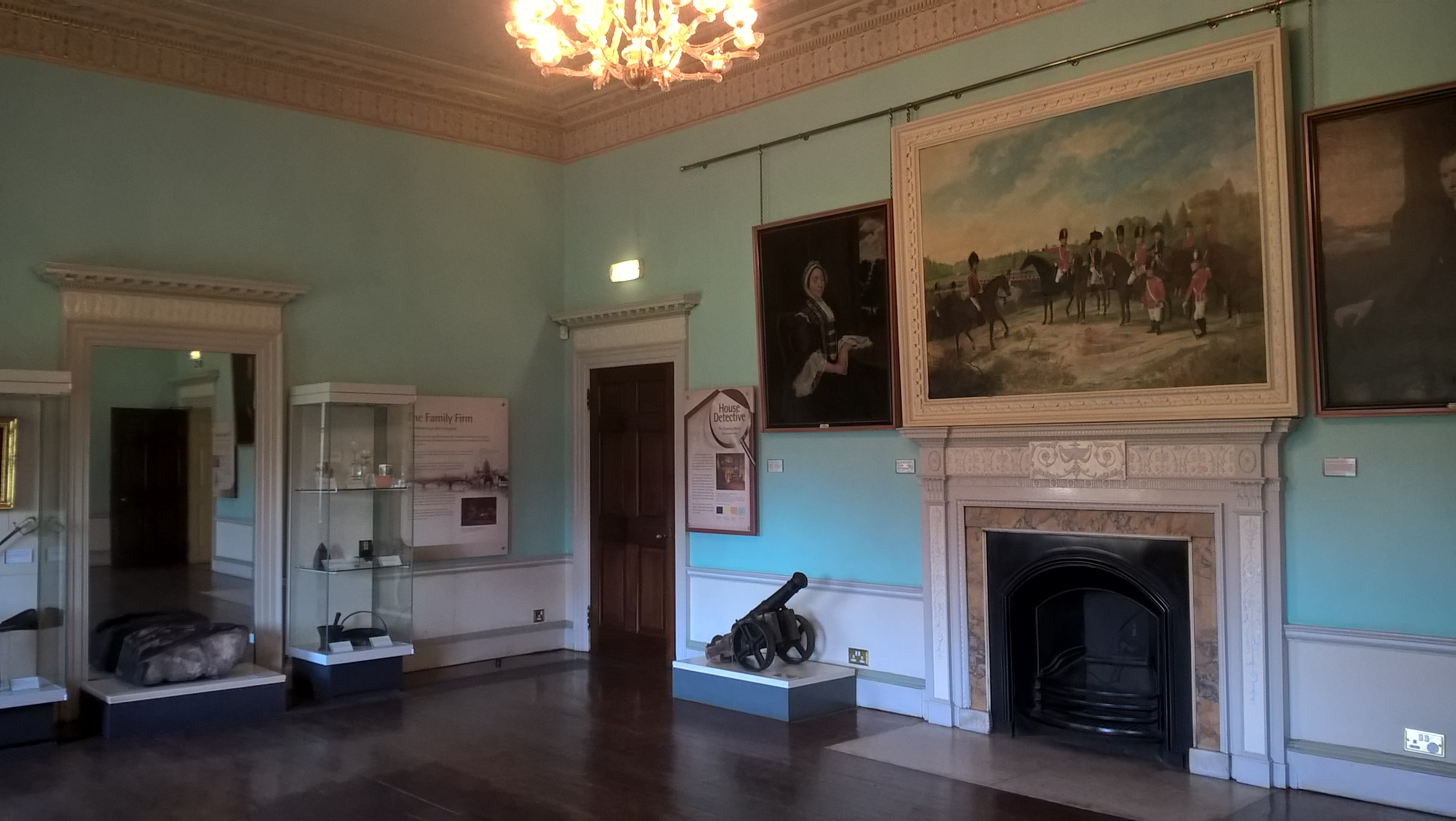
The museum

In 2003 the museum closed for a major refurbishment of the building and displays, partly funded by the Heritage Lottery Fund. During this time it was twice shortlisted for the Gulbenkian Prize for Museum of the Year in 2003 and 2004, for its innovative outreach programmes, despite the building being closed to the public. The refurbishment cost £3 million in total and included major repairs to the roof, heating systems, stonework, windows and electrical systems. In addition to new displays, improved public facilities included a study room, a cafeteria and a gift shop. A lift was also installed to make the building fully accessible to disabled visitors. The interior was redecorated using the exact colour scheme as used when the building was a Georgian country house in the 18th century. Clifton Park Museum re-opened to the public on 29 January 2005.

=== York and Lancaster Regimental Museum ===
The York and Lancaster Regimental Museum is a separate museum located inside Clifton Park Museum and covers the history of the Regiment and its precursors the 65th and 84th Regiments of Foot. The displays have uniforms, equipment and guns from all periods of the history.

=== Collections ===
The museum collections include local social and industrial history, archaeology, natural sciences, coins and medals and fine and decorative arts. These include Roman remains from Templeborough, and Nelson, a stuffed Cape Lion. The museum is noted for its particularly fine collection of Rockingham Pottery, including one of only two specimens of porcelain 'Rhinoceros Vase', which were created as showcases of the work of the pottery.

== Clifton Park ==
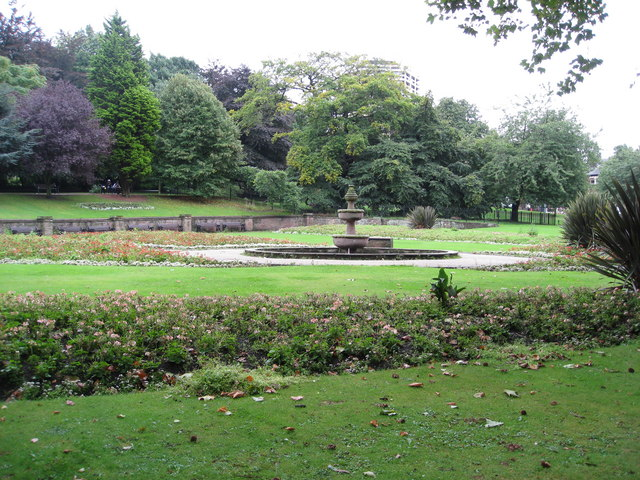
The memorial garden

The park in which the museum sits is Grade II listed with Historic England so too are the gate piers at one of the entrances. Clifton Park was opened on 25 June 1891 by the Prince of Wales, later Edward VII. Between 1891 and 1893 changes were made to the grounds to add footpaths, entrances and facilities resulting in the original walled kitchen garden being demolished. In the 1830s a commemorative beech tree was planted for Queen Victoria's coronation. In 1900 the main entrance was added, the Cenotaph was added in 1922, and the Memorial Gardens in 1948. The park was given a Heritage Lottery Fund award with a value of £7.6m and between 2009 and 2011 new features such as the water play area was added. A new walled garden was built and has plots maintained by a variety of different groups. The memorial garden has floral displays and a central fountain which is engraved with the names of Rotherham's Victoria Cross holders. The rock garden includes a waterfall and ponds. A new garden house and courtyard was built and offers event spaces and toilets. The house garden has Japanese maples, bamboos and a yellow weigelia.

=== Facilities ===
In addition to the museum there is a landtrain, children's play area, mini golf, crazy golf, a sand pit, a wet splash area, a rock garden, a memorial garden, a skate park, a fun park, a bowling green, tennis courts, picnicking, walking and a bandstand. A Parkrun takes place in the park every Saturday morning.

== See also ==
- Grade II* listed buildings in South Yorkshire
- Listed buildings in Rotherham (Boston Castle Ward)
