= Listed buildings in Rotherham (Boston Castle Ward) =

List of buildings

Boston Castle is a ward in the Metropolitan Borough of Rotherham, South Yorkshire, England. The ward contains 39 listed buildings that are recorded in the National Heritage List for England. Of these, three are listed at Grade I, the highest of the three grades, three are at Grade II*, the middle grade, and the others are at Grade II, the lowest grade. The ward contains the central part of the town of Rotherham and the area of Moorgate to the south. The listed buildings include houses and associated structures, churches and a chapel, shop and offices, re-sited Roman remains, a former shooting lodge in the form of a castle, schools, a lamp standard for an oil lamp, a former foundry, mileposts, a public house, a commemorative clock, two war memorials, and a former cinema.

== Key ==
Grade	Criteria
I	Buildings of exceptional interest, sometimes considered to be internationally important
II*	Particularly important buildings of more than special interest
II	Buildings of national importance and special interest

== Buildings ==
Name and location	Photograph	Date	Notes	Grade
Roman remains, Clifton Park; 53.42972°N 1.34618°W		2nd century	The remains were removed from Templeborough Roman fort and resited behind Clifton House in 1916, and are in sandstone. There are fragmentary remains of the portico and the colonnaded verandah of a pair of granaries in their original layout, and one Doric column has been re-erected. Associated remains are scattered at random elsewhere on the site.	II
Rotherham Minster; 53.43102°N 1.35660°W		14th century	The church has been altered and extended during the centuries, and was restored in the 19th century, especially by George Gilbert Scott in 1873–75. It is built in sandstone with lead roofs, and is in Perpendicular style. The church has a cruciform plan, consisting of a nave with a clerestory, north and south aisles, a south porch, north and south transepts, a chancel with north and south chapels and a north vestry, and a steeple at the crossing. The steeple has a tower with angle buttresses rising to pinnacles, four-light bell openings, clock faces flanked by gargoyles, crocketed pinnacles, and a recessed octagonal spire with a weathervane. Along the body of the church are embattled parapets and crocketed pinnacles.	I
25 and 27 High Street; 53.43028°N 1.35614°W		15th century	Originally part of an inn, later a shop, it has a timber framed core, stuccoed on the front, and a Welsh slate roof. There are three storeys, the upper floors jettied, a front of two bays with coped gables, and a rear wing. In the ground floor are 20th-century shop windows, a central doorway and a passage entry on the left. The upper floors contain sash windows. Inside, most of the timber framing is concealed.	II*
Rotherham Bridge; 53.43264°N 1.35815°W		15th century	The bridge carried Bridge Street over the River Don. It was widened and extended in the 18th century, but restored to its original form to be used as a footbridge in the 1930s, and no longer spans the whole river. The bridge is in sandstone and consists of four double-chamfered pointed arches. Some of the arches have retained their cutwaters, and the bridge has a renewed parapet with moulded copings.	I
Chapel of Our Lady; 53.43271°N 1.35817°W		1483	The chapel is on Rotherham Bridge and was restored in 1924. It is in sandstone, with a string course, and an embattled parapet with crocketed pinnacles, and is in Perpendicular style. There is a single storey with an undercroft, and fronts of one and two bays. On the gabled front is a doorway with a moulded surround, a Tudor arch, and a hood mould. To its right is a slit window, above is a two-light window, and on the sides are three-light windows with hood moulds.	I
Remains of the College of Jesus; 53.43155°N 1.35519°W	—	1483	The remains consist of three two-storey brick walls encased in later buildings. They contain doorways with brick arches, and windows with moulded surrounds. The walls are the earliest surviving brick structure in South Yorkshire.	II
Doorway southeast of Boston Castle; 53.41824°N 1.35356°W	—	Early to mid 17th century	The doorway, originally in the College of Jesus buildings, was re-sited in a rock face in 1876. It consists of a limestone moulded architrave and an aedicule set in a brick panel and infilled in brick. This is flanked by panelled pilasters on plinth blocks, with acanthus-carved consoles, and above is a moulded segmental pediment.	II
Moorgate Hall and outbuilding 53.42372°N 1.35244°W		17th century	A large house that was rebuilt in the early 18th century, and an outbuilding added in the late 18th century. It is in sandstone with an eaves cornice and a hipped Welsh slate roof. There are two storeys, an entrance front of four bays, and an outbuilding recessed on the left. On the entrance front is a central doorway, a continuous hood mould, and sash windows. At the rear are five bays, the middle three bays projecting with three storeys under a pediment containing an oeil-de-boeuf, and flanked by quoins.	II*
Wellgate Old Hall; 53.42811°N 1.35185°W	—	Late 17th century	A sandstone house, incorporating 15th-century timbers, with quoins, a floor band, an eaves cornice, and a hipped tile roof. There are two storeys and five bays, with a pediment over the middle three bays, containing an oculus with a moulded architrave in the tympanum. The doorway has a moulded surround and quoined jambs, and the windows are mullioned, with casements.	II
Sundial, Clifton Park; 53.42973°N 1.34517°W		1739	The sundial is in sandstone, and has an inscribed chamfered square plinth. The shaft is octagonal and rises to become cylindrical, and has a moulded capital, and a cuboid sundial with an inscription and iron gnomons. This is surmounted by a two-stage plinth and a ball finial.	II
31 Bridgegate; 53.43200°N 1.35694°W	—	Mid 18th century	A house, later a shop, it is in painted red brick, with a moulded eaves cornice, and a Welsh slate roof with a coped gable and kneelers on the right. There are three storeys and five bays, the middle bay projecting slightly under a pediment. The ground floor contains a 20th-century shop front. In the middle bay is a Venetian window in the middle floor, and a Diocletian window in the top floor, and the other windows are sashes. All the windows have keystones.	II
59 and 61 Moorgate Road; 53.42115°N 1.34934°W	—	Mid 18th century	A pair of houses, later shops, in sandstone, with quoins, and a Welsh slate roof with coped gables and shaped kneelers. There are two storeys, half-basements and attics, and three bays. In the centre are paired doorways flanked by shop windows with pilaster, a frieze, and a cornice. The upper floors contain sash windows, and at the rear are paired stair windows and two dormers.	II
Boston Castle; 53.41875°N 1.35454°W		1773–74	Originally a shooting lodge, it is in sandstone with quoins and a coped embattled parapet. There are two storeys, a square plan, and a single cell with an addition to the north. It contains a doorway with a quoined surround, and casement windows in architraves.	II
29 and 29A High Street; 53.43026°N 1.35628°W	—	Late 18th century	A house, later a shop, in sandstone, with chamfered quoins, an eaves cornice, and a Welsh slate roof with coped gables and square-cut kneelers. There are three storeys and four bays. In the ground floor are 20th-century shop windows, and the upper floors contain sash windows.	II
Gate piers, Clifton Park; 53.43041°N 1.34167°W	—	Late 18th century	The gate piers at the entrance to the park are in sandstone. They consist of a pair of piers linked to lower outer piers by dwarf walls with railings. The main piers are rusticated, and each pier has a cornice and is surmounted by an urn with foliage carving and swags.	II
Stable block and walls, Clifton Park; 53.42956°N 1.34653°W	—	Late 18th century	The former stable block is in sandstone, with a floor band, a moulded cornice, and a hipped Welsh slate roof. It is a small square building with two storeys and three bays. In the entrance front are two doorways with lintels extending as quoins, and in the upper floor is a hatch flanked by round pitching holes. At the rear are two round-arched recesses, one with a casement window. The wing wall to the right ends in a pier, from which extends a taller curved portion of wall.	II
Former Feoffees' School; 53.42884°N 1.35486°W	—	1776	A charity school, later a public house, it is in sandstone with a sill band and hipped Welsh slate roofs. There are two storeys, and a front of four bays, the middle two bays projecting slightly under a pediment, and a two-bay wing recessed on the left. Steps lead up to a central round-headed doorway with an architrave and a cornice, over which is an inscribed panel, and above this is a round-arched recess. The windows are casements, those flanking the doorway with lintels grooved to resemble voussoirs, those in the outer bays in round-arched recesses, and those in the top floor with wedge lintels. In the angle with the wing is a porch containing a doorway with an architrave, a frieze, and a pediment.	II
Clifton House; 53.42961°N 1.34704°W		1783	A large house designed by John Carr and later a museum. It is in sandstone on a plinth, with a dentilled cornice, and a hipped slate roof. There are two storeys and symmetrical fronts of five and six bays. The entrance front has five bays, the middle three bays projecting slightly under a pediment. In the centre is an open porch with paired Doric columns, an entablature and a mutule cornice, and a doorway with a fanlight. Above the ground floor is a floor band and a sill band, between which are sections of blind balustrading. Over the porch is a Doric Venetian window, and the other windows are sashes. At the rear is a canted two-storey bay window.	II*
7 and 9 Westgate; 53.42971°N 1.35744°W	—	1794	A house later used for other purposes, it is in sandstone, with a sill band, a string course, a moulded cornice, a blocking course, and a coated slate roof. There are three storeys, and six bays, the left bay and the right two bays projecting, In the ground floor are 20th-century shop fronts, and the upper floors contain a mix of casement and sash windows.	II
12 Wellgate; 53.43015°N 1.35456°W	—	Early 19th century	A shop in stuccoed sandstone with a floor band, a moulded eaves band, a cornice and blocking course, and a Welsh slate roof. There are three storeys and four bays. At the right end of the ground floor is a square-headed carriage entrance, and to its left is a 20th-century shop front flanked by Greek Doric half-columns. Above it is a frieze with triglyphs, and a mutule cornice. The upper floors contain sash windows, those in the top floor with recessed aprons.	II
Former offices, The Crofts; 53.42993°N 1.35572°W	—	Early 19th century	The office building, later part of a hotel, is in sandstone on a plinth, with a coated slate roof, and is in Tudor Revival style, There are two storeys and a front of three bays. The outer bays project, and each contains a doorway with monolithic piers and a cornice. Between them is a three-light mullioned window, and above is a continuous hood mould. In the upper floor the bays are flanked by octagonal turrets, the outer bays containing Tudor arched openings over an apron panel of shields. The middle bay contains a three-light mullioned window with ogee-headed lights, and at the top is a cornice and parapets, embattled over the outer bays, and stepped over the centre bay.	II
Lamp standard, Wellgate; 53.42869°N 1.35253°W	—	Early 19th century	The lamp standard is in sandstone, and consists of a tapering column on a square plinth, with a domed top. It is surmounted by a cast iron finial with out-curled leaves that originally carried an oil lamp.	II
The Factory Shop; 53.43076°N 1.35618°W	—	Early to mid 19th century	A house, later a shop, on a corner site, it is in ered brick with stone dressings, with chamfered quoins, a sill band with a moulded soffit, oversailing eaves on shaped brackets, and a Welsh slate roof, hipped on the corner. There are three storeys and fronts of three bays, the middle bay of the main front projecting under a pediment. In the ground floor are shop windows, and the upper floors contain sash windows, in architraves with moulded sills on brackets.	II
Oakwood Hall and wall 53.41370°N 1.34500°W	—	1856–59	A large house, later used as offices, in sandstone on a plinth, with bands, a modillion eaves cornice surmounted by a balustraded parapet, and a hipped Welsh slate roof. There are two storeys, a double-depth plan, a front of five bays, and a recessed right wing with a three-storey tower. On the front is a Doric portico with paired columns, a plain frieze and a mutule cornice, surmounted by a balustrade with gadrooned urns. The windows are sashes with architraves, and on the returns are two-storey canted bay windows. Attached to each side of the portico are curved retaining walls with balustrades and gadrooned urns.	II
Former brass and iron foundry 53.42796°N 1.36081°W		c. 1857	Most of the foundry has been demolished, the remaining buildings being three parallel ranges. These are in red brick and the roofs are in Welsh slate, with some corrugated sheeting and felt on the northern range. The northern range has three storeys and 34 bays, and contains a crane hall, and an engine house with a two-storey water tower above. The middle range has three storeys, a front of 18 bays and four bays on the sides, and its roof is hipped. Most of the southern range has three storeys and 14 bays, and at the west end is a two-storey four-bay building. On its front are arched window heads with imposts and keystones, sill bands, rusticated pilasters, a cornice and a central parapet.	II
Thomas Rotherham College; 53.41962°N 1.35010°W		1874–77	A school, at one time a grammar school, and later extended, it is in sandstone with limestone dressings and a red tile roof. In the centre is a five-storey tower, flanked by two-storey wings with four bays, two projecting bays on the left, and three rear wings. The tower has chamfered and moulded plinths, quoins, angle buttresses, string courses, and an embattled parapet. On the front is a doorway with a pointed arch, colonnettes, and panelled spandrels, above which is a two-storey oriel window. On the right is an octagonal turret, and at the rear on the right is an octagonal embattled turret. The side wings have gables with moulded copings, and contain cross windows.	II
Milepost opposite 144 Broom Road; 53.42241°N 1.33789°W		Second half, 19th century	The milepost is on the northeast side of Broom Road, (A6102 road). It consists of a gritstone pillar with cast iron overlay, and has a triangular plan and a rounded top. On the top is inscribed "ROTHERHAM & BARNBY MOOR ROAD" and "ROTHERHAM", and on the angled sides are the distances to Barmby Moor, Bawtry, Tickhill, and Rotherham, College Square.	II
Milepost opposite 85 and 87 West Bawtry Road; 53.40755°N 1.35885°W		Second half, 19th century	The milepost is on the southwest side of West Bawtry Road (A631 road). It consists of a gritstone pillar with cast iron overlay, and has a rounded top, the lower part missing. On the top is inscribed "BAWTRY & TINSLEY ROAD" and "WHISTON".	II
Milepost opposite Moorgzate Grove; 53.41966°N 1.34791°W		Second half, 19th century	The milepost is on the southwest side of Moorgate Road (A618 road). It consists of a sandstone post and a cast iron plaque, with a rounded top and two lower panels. On the top is inscribed "ROTHERHAM & PLEASLEY/ROAD" and "ROTHERHAM", and on the lower panels are the distances to Rotherham, College Square, Mansfield Town Hall, Pleasley Old Cross, and Clown Old Cross.	II
Former School of Science and Art; 53.43301°N 1.35515°W		1887–89	The original school was altered and converted into the Town Hall with courts in 1895–97. In 1990 the façade was retained when the buildings behind were converted into a shopping arcade. The façade is in sandstone, with two storeys and a front of 14 bays. The arched entrance is flanked by paired Ionic pilasters, above which is a lettered frieze and a shallow segmental pediment. Over this are two blind windows, a triangular pediment, and a statue of Queen Victoria. In the ground floor, the windows have flat heads, and in the upper floor they have round-arched heads with keystones.	II
Former Williams and Glyns Bank; 53.43062°N 1.35490°W		1892	The former bank, on a corner site, is in sandstone on a plinth, with a floor band, a full entablature, a parapet, and a Welsh slate roof. There are two storeys and attics, five bays on High Street, six bays on Wellgate, and a curved bay on the corner. Between the bays are Corinthian columns in polished Aberdeen granite. There are two doorways on High Street, the left with quarter colonnettes in the jambs, and above it is an inscribed panel and a segmental pediment with a coat of arms. The right doorway has an architrave, a plain panel, and a triangular pediment on consoles. The windows are casements, those in the ground floor with bracketed sills, architraves and pediments.	II
Former Town Hall; 53.43268°N 1.35541°W		1896–97	The town hall, which incorporated earlier fabric, and which included civic offices, a courtroom, and assembly rooms, has been converted for other uses. It is in sandstone on a plinth, with a floor band, and a Welsh slate roof, and it occupies a corner site. There are mainly two storeys, and the corner is curved. The main entrance has a rusticated arch, blocked Ionic columns, and a canopy on console brackets. The corner bay contains a shop front in the ground floor, over which is a curved four-light mullioned and transomed window with a cornice, and a parapet with an inscribed panel.	II
Talbot Lane Methodist Church; 53.42871°N 1.35631°W		1902–03	The church is in sandstone with a slate roof, and consists of a nave, aisles, transepts, and a chancel with an apse. The entrance front is at the east and has a steeple on the left and a projection on the right. The steeple has a tower with three stages, angle buttresses rising to octagonal turrets with crocketed spirelets, a doorway above which are two lancet windows, a blind panel, a two-light window, and an octagonal spire with lucarnes and a weathervane. To the right are paired doorways with pointed heads and granite colonnettes, above which is a five-light window, and a stepped four-light window in the gable.	II
Imperial Buildings; 53.43037°N 1.35714°W		1905–07	Shop and offices with an internal shopping arcade on an island site, the building is in red brick with stone dressings, curved corners at the front, and slate roofs, and is in Jacobean Revival style. There are three storeys at the front and two at the rear, and in the ground floor some Edwardian shop fronts have been retained. In the upper floors, the bays are separated by paired Doric pilasters. The main entrance to the offices has flanking marble pilasters, a segmental-arched hood on brackets, and a balustrade with finials over an inscribed and dated tympanum.	II
Cutlers Arms; 53.42834°N 1.35787°W		1907	The public house is in glazed faience blocks, on a skirt of red brick, with a Welsh slate roof. There are two storeys and an attic, three bays and a narrow bay on the left. The doorway has a fanlight, the ground floor windows have flat heads and the upper floor windows have arched tops and alternately projecting voussoirs. Above the window in the left bay is heraldic relief carving. Between the bays are pilasters at the top of which are armorial carvings, and between them are two shaped parapets containing lettering and the date. In the roof is a three-light dormer, and many of the windows contain Art Nouveau stained glass.	II
The Hastings Clock; 53.43335°N 1.35485°W	—	1912	The clock commemorates the Coronation of George V and Mary, and is in cast iron. It has a tapered octagonal pedestal with two drinking basins, and between them is a semicircular horse trough on supports in the form of horse's legs and hooves. Above are panels, two of them with inscriptions, and a quatrefoil column with a moulded base and a foliate capital. At mid-point are four pendant lights, and at the top is a square clock that has a dentilled cornice with acorn corner finials. This is surmounted by an elaborate openwork corona, with a bell suspended from its centre.	II
War memorial, Clifton Park; 53.43122°N 1.34897°W		1922	The war memorial is at the northwest entrance to the park, and consists of a sandstone cenotaph on a granite stylobate, with a curtain wall at the rear. The plinth has an inscription, and on the shaft is a carved wreath and a bronze sword. On the top is a stylised sarcophagus with swags and a cornice, surmounted by a bronze brazier with an eternal flame. The curtain wall had end piers, and contains 13 bronze panels with the names of those lost in the First World War.	II
War Memorial, Rotherham Grammar School; 53.42001°N 1.35032°W		1925	The war memorial is in an enclosure in the grounds of Thomas Rotherham College. It is in the style of a medieval cross with a central York rose motif. The cross has a tapering octagonal shaft on an octagonal plinth on a base of two steps. There are two tiers of bronze plaques on the plinth with inscriptions and the names of those lost in the two World Wars and a later conflict.	II
Former Regal Cinema; 53.43189°N 1.35850°W	—	1934	The former cinema, which is in Art Deco style, has a steel frame, faced in brick and concrete, with dressings in faience and brick, a plinth, a parapet, and a corrugated metal roof. There are two storeys and a basement, and a front of five bays, the middle three bays containing the entrance under a canopy, and flanked by reeded pilasters with torch-shaped flagpole holders at the top. Between the pilasters are cross windows, and the outer bays have windows with Art Deco glazing and shop fronts below. Inside, many Art Deco features remain.	II
