= Rotherham Minster =

Church in South Yorkshire, England

- Minster Church of All Saints
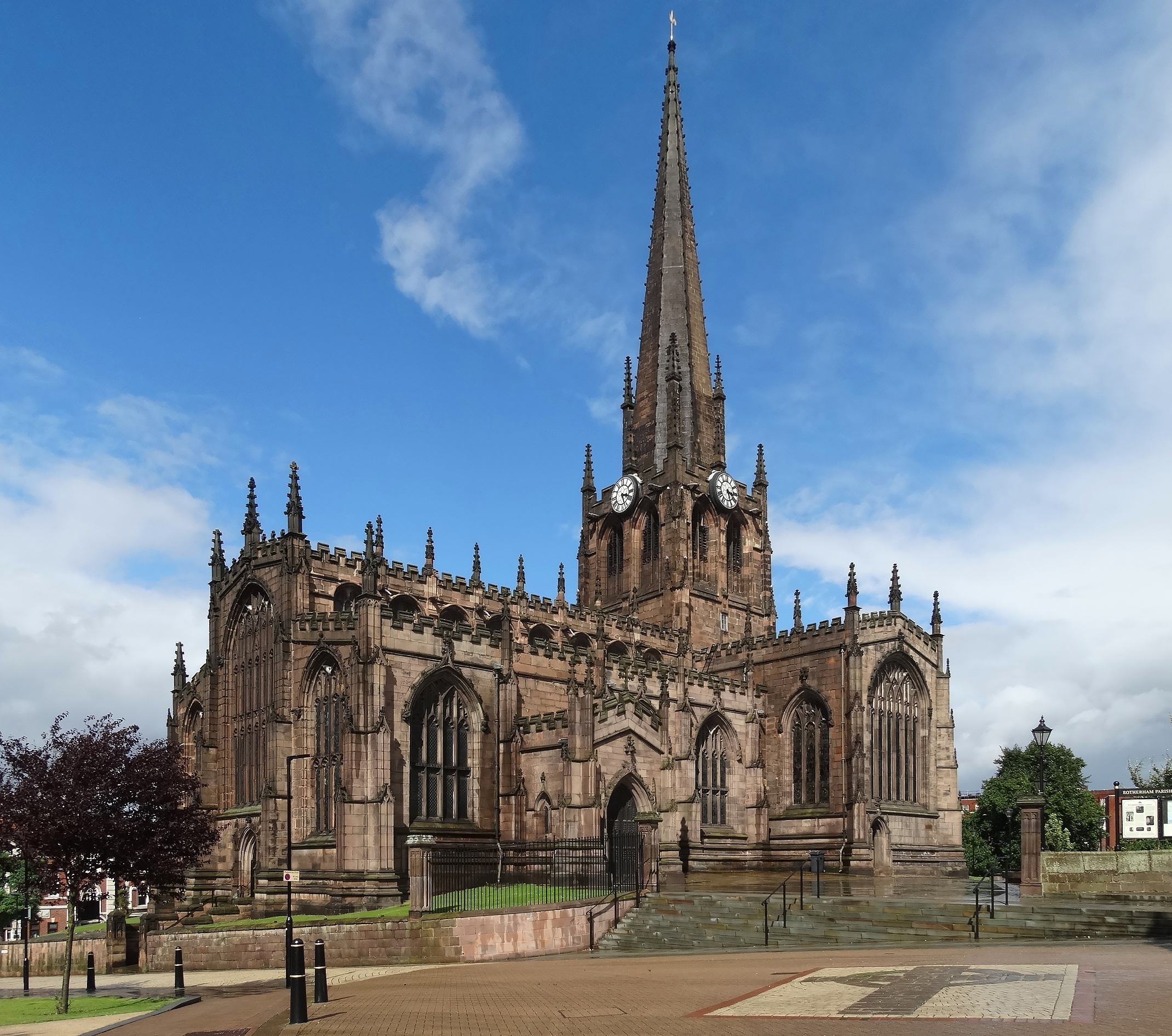
- Rotherham Minster from the south-west

- Location in South Yorkshire
- 53.4310°N 1.3569°W
- OS grid reference: SK 428 928
- Location: Rotherham, South Yorkshire, England
- Denomination: Church of England
- Churchmanship: Broad Church
- Website: www.rotherhamminster.co.uk

History
- Founded: 937
- Dedication: All Saints

Architecture
- Style: Decorated Gothic, Perpendicular Gothic
- Years built: c. 1400–1512

Administration
- Province: York
- Diocese: Sheffield
- Archdeaconry: Sheffield and Rotherham
- Parish: Rotherham

The Minster Church of All Saints or Rotherham Minster is the Anglican minster church of Rotherham, South Yorkshire, England. The Minster is a prominent example of Perpendicular Gothic architecture and various architectural historians have rated it highly. Nikolaus Pevsner describes it as "one of the largest and stateliest churches in Yorkshire", Simon Jenkins states it is "the best work in the county", and Alec Clifton-Taylor calls it the "glory of Rotherham". With its tall spire, it is Rotherham's most predominant landmark, and amongst the tallest churches in Yorkshire.

The church has been designated as Grade I listed since 1951 by Historic England and was granted Minster status in 2004. The minster is also one of two parish churches to have minster status in South Yorkshire, the other being Doncaster Minster.

== History ==
=== Saxon and Norman eras ===
In Saxon times, Rotherham seems to have been a place of some importance. It had a Saxon church, a market and a fair all before the Norman Conquest. The Domesday Book of 1086 records a church on the site, despite the future town only having a population of twelve households.

This small Saxon church was replaced by a much larger Norman edifice during the 12th century, similar in plan to today's Minster. This Norman church was built using Rotherham Red sandstone and decorated using Magnesium Limestone from Conisborough. It was cruciform in plan, having a chancel, nave, transepts and a low central lantern tower. Little is known about either of these two previous churches, however, the line of the old Norman roof ridge can still be seen on the western tower arch in the present church.

=== Gothic rebuilding ===
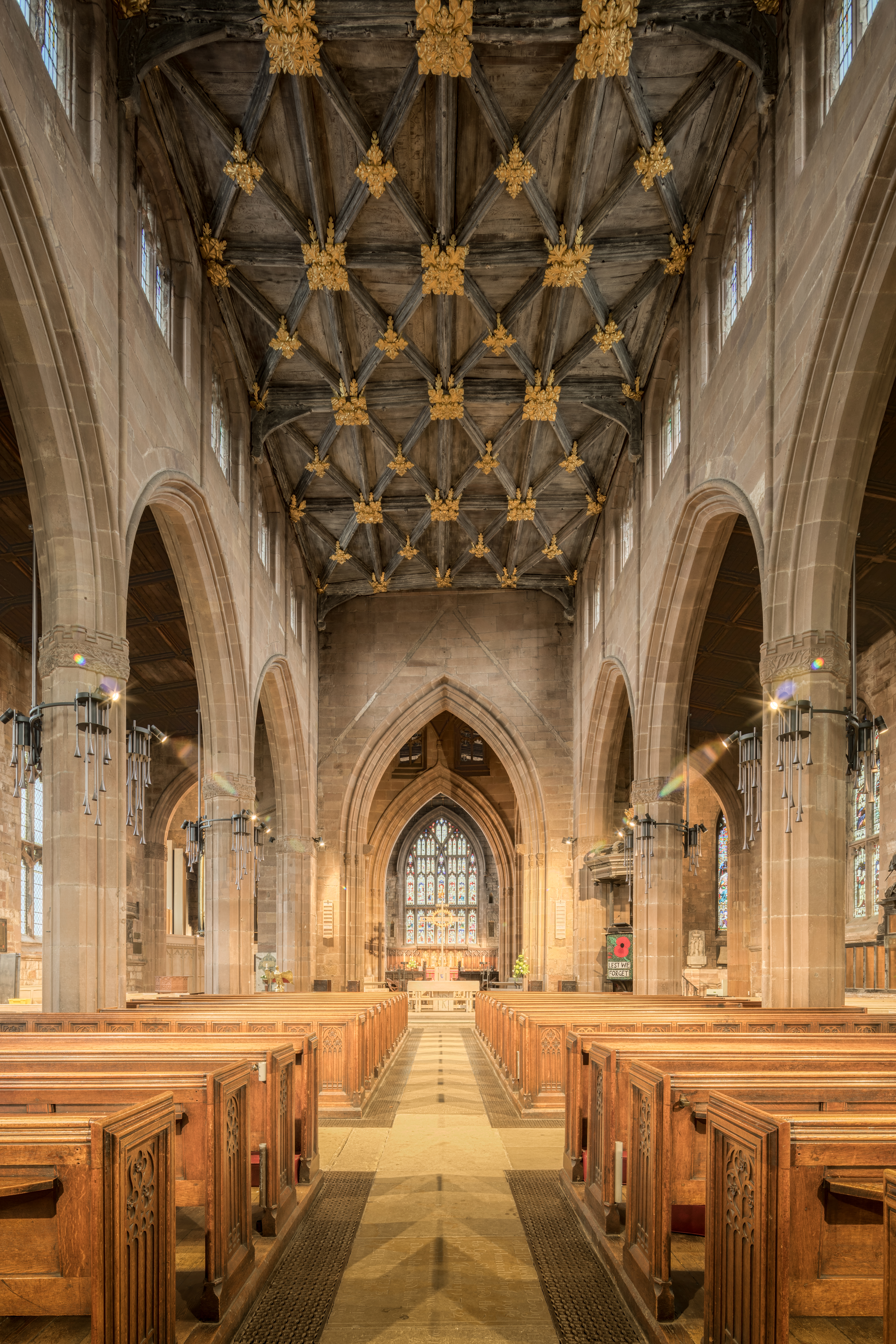
Perpendicular Gothic nave (late 15th century), with multiple bosses

During the 14th to 15th centuries, the church came under the control of the Cistercian Abbeys of Rufford (Nottinghamshire) and Clairvaux (Kingdom of Burgundy), whose monks began rebuilding the church in the Gothic style, beginning with the chancel. The chancel was rebuilt in the Decorated Gothic style in the early part of the 14th century, initially as a single storey. In 1409, the vicar received a letter from Henry Bowet, Archbishop of York, granting him permission to sell indulgences to raise funds to repair and raise the tower. This must have taken some time, as the tower vault was not completed until 1420.

Construction of the new central tower and spire caused issues, for the Gothic builders used the bases of the original Norman piers to take the strain, but these were not in line with the new Gothic arms of the church, and thus the piers no longer formed a square. To cover for this, the builders decorated the intersections of the ribs with carved leaves, to disguise the awkward construction.

The main period of building was from 1480 to 1512, which includes the chancel chapel built by Thomas Rotherham, the locally born Archbishop of York, now called the 'Jesus Chapel', the nave, transepts and aisles. The chancel was also heightened with an additional storey and a new roof. By 1512, the building was essentially complete, with an aisled nave and chancel, transepts and central tower with spire.

=== 17th to 19th centuries ===
During the English Civil War, Rotherham fell to Royalist forces. John Shaw, the English puritan minister, took refuge in the tower at Rotherham Minster during an attack by Royalist forces in January 1643 when his sermon was interrupted. Bullet holes in the roof found two hundred years later suggest they tried to flush him out, but he fled to Kingston upon Hull.

Beginning in the 18th century, major alterations to the internal fabric of the Minster took place. Galleries were inserted around the walls in the nave and transepts, high "horse-box" pews were added in the nave and the pulpit was placed under the tower arch at the end of the nave. An organ was added in 1777, initially placed under the chancel arch, but was moved in 1843 to the north transept.

Major restoration of the entire building took place from 1873 to 1875, led by Sir George Gilbert Scott. Under his direction, the galleries and box pews were removed, the stonework cleaned and restored, and the roofs renovated. Evidence was found during this restoration of fires in the roofs, along with bullet holes from the English Civil War. The south transept ceiling and roof required more attention, and repairs were conducted using pine, rather than oak, as the natural resin found within it makes it resistant to insect damage. The large Great East Window was given during this restoration by the Earl and Countess of Effingham, designed by Scott. A new font was manufactured in memory of the vicar, William Newton, who died during the restoration. The original Norman font was moved to a chapel in the chancel, the pulpit was moved to the northern side of the nave and the chancel was re-ordered. Scott chose to keep and preserve the medieval misericords and choir stalls, recognising their importance. To celebrate the completion of the restoration project, a new brass eagle lectern was manufactured.

=== Modern history ===
The Jesus Chapel was restored in 1921 as a memorial to the people of Rotherham killed during the First World War, and a new window was created as part of the restoration.

During 1932, the north side of the churchyard was levelled to create 'All Saints Square'. To prepare for this, the northern part of the churchyard was surveyed, the results of which showed more than 500 burials present in the area. These burials were re-interred in Moorgate Cemetery. The roof bosses in the nave were extensively restored in 1976. A major restoration of the Minster was begun in 2001, costing nearly £2.25 million. The restoration involved covering almost the whole building in scaffolding in stages, restoring battlements, window repairs, a new chancel roof, restoration to the stone inside the building, a new kitchen to allow hot meals, a new lighting system and restoration to the clock faces.

It was found, however, that major repairs were required to the spire when a routine inspection was undertaken in 2010. The inspection revealed large holes in the spire, the cast-iron tie-bars were corroding, the stonework was crumbling and the spire was beginning to lean. Beginning in late 2010, the spire was encased in scaffolding and the top 33 feet (10 m) was taken down and rebuilt. The cast-iron tie-bars were replaced by new tie bars that did not contain iron to avoid corrosion in the future. The project was completed in December 2011.

A further project was launched in 2021 to restore the Great West Window, with a funding goal of more than £300,000. The Minster received £25,000 from the Cultural Recovery Fund in 2021, which meant the first stage of works to the window could begin. The stained glass in the window, which dates to 1884 by Clayton & Bell, was at risk of collapse. Scaffolding was being assembled inside and outside the window and expected to remain in place for 9 months.

== Architecture ==
=== Exterior ===
Simon Jenkins describes Rotherham Minster as a "polished work of Perpendicular Gothic". The entire building has a unified appearance, the majority of it was built in the same period in the 15th and 16th centuries. It is a large, cruciform church built of sandstone, with battlements, crocketted pinnacles, large traceried windows and buttresses. The focal point of the exterior is the tall central tower and spire, which rises to a height of 180 feet (55 m), topped by a 7-foot tall weathervane. The Minster is floodlit at night. According to the Church of England, the Minster has an area of more than 1,100 sq m, which makes it a "very large" building.

==== Facades ====
The Minster has four main facades; the east and west facades which include the Great East and Great West windows, and the north and south facades that run along the length of the building. The west facade has a transomed seven-light window in the centre, flanked by two four-light windows, all Perpendicular Gothic in style, and buttresses separating each window. The east facade has a similar setup to the west facade, with a seven-light central window flanked by smaller five-light windows.

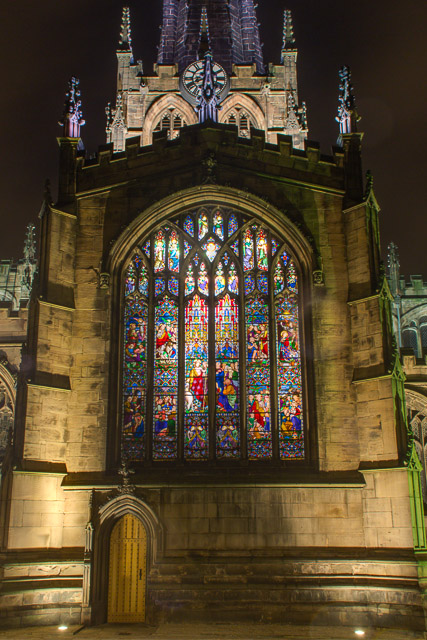
South transept, by night.

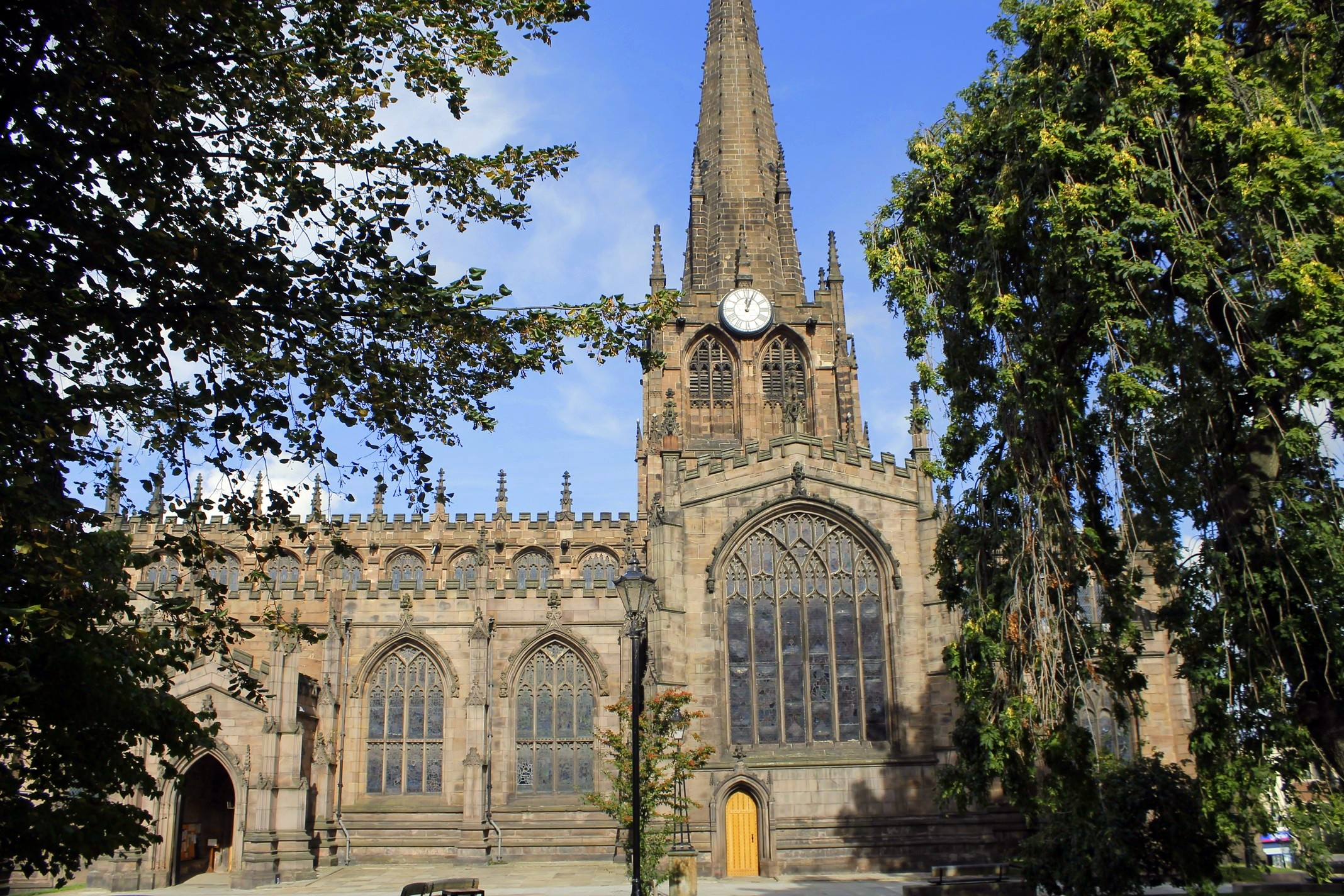
South facade

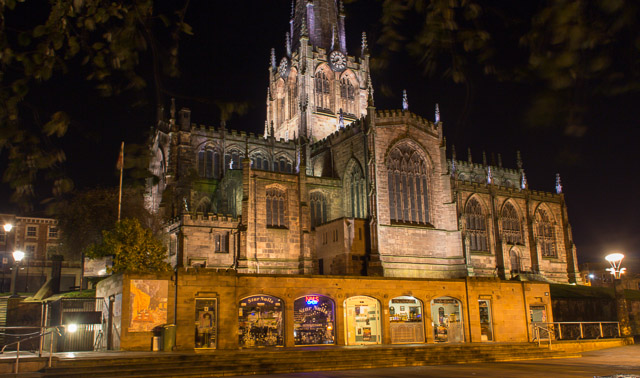
North facade

==== Nave and chancel ====
The Minster has a four-bay aisled nave some 105 feet (32 m) long, interrupted on the south side by the gabled porch. The bays are separated by angle buttresses, which rise to crocketted pinnacles above the battlements. The nave aisles contain large four-light windows in each bay, above which is the clerestory. The clerestory windows are smaller, of three-light design, two windows per bay.

The chancel is formed of two bays, similar in design to the nave, but with a taller clerestory to compensate for the slightly lower chancel aisles. The chancel aisles terminate short of the eastern gable end, both ending in chapels. As with the nave, each bay is separated by corner buttresses, rising to crocketted pinnacles.

==== Transepts ====
The transepts are 35 feet (11 m) long each and the total length between the gable ends of the transepts is 100 feet (30 m). Each transept is two bays in length, and there is a large six-light Perpendicular window in each gable, with tall three-light windows on the east and west sides, facing the aisles. There is a door below the south window, something not replicated in the north transept. The gable end of each transept has four-stage corner buttresses on both sides, rising to tall pinnacles. The transepts are slightly lower than the chancel and nave.

==== Central Tower and Spire ====
The central tower contains two stages; a shorter, plainly decorated stage above the crossing, containing a simple transomed window in each face and a taller belfry stage above, each face of the tower containing two four-light louvred belfry-openings. The belfry stage is highly decorative, each opening flanked by pinnacled angle buttresses, transoms, and king mullions. The lower halve of each opening is formed of blind panels. There is a large white clock face above each face, centred between the belfry openings and battlements, flanked by gargoyles.

The tower is crowned by a tall, recessed octagonal spire with crocheted ribs and pinnacled shafts that rise from the corners. The spire is crowned by a gilded weather vane, some 7 feet tall.

=== Interior ===
The interior is spacious, light and airy. The main aisle of the Minster is tall and wide, lit by numerous large windows. The arcade, which makes up the majority of the height of the nave, is separated from the clerestory above it by a narrow row of carved foliage. The nave piers are lozenge in shape, with moulded arches separating the piers. The chancel is of two ages, the lower storey from the early 14th century and the upper storey and main window from the early 15th century. There are niches either side of the east window which implies before the second storey was constructed in the 15th century, statues flanked the window. The transepts are both lit by large windows, the window of the north transept being clear glass. There is an "immense" groined fan vault underneath the tower, dating from 1420, amongst the earliest of its kind.

==== Stained glass ====
The Minster has nearly forty windows, many of which contain stained glass. Notable windows include the Great West Window, which contains glass dating back to 1884 by Clayton & Bell, the Great East Window, also by Clayton & Bell, and the South Transept window, also from the 19th century.

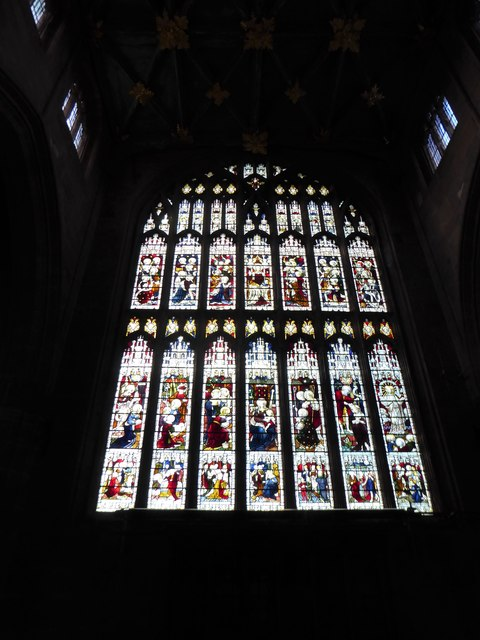
Great West Window

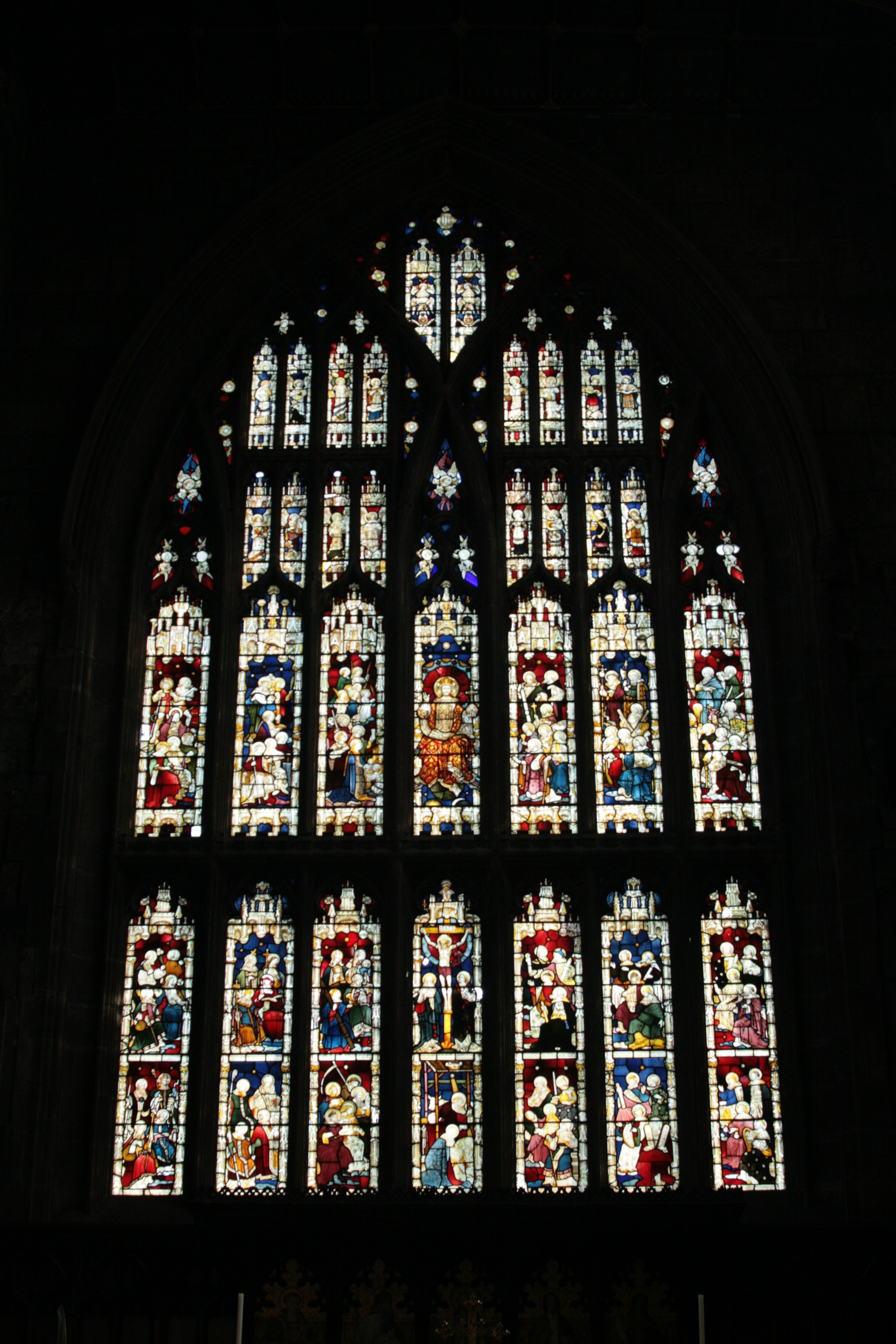
Great East (or Te Deum) Window

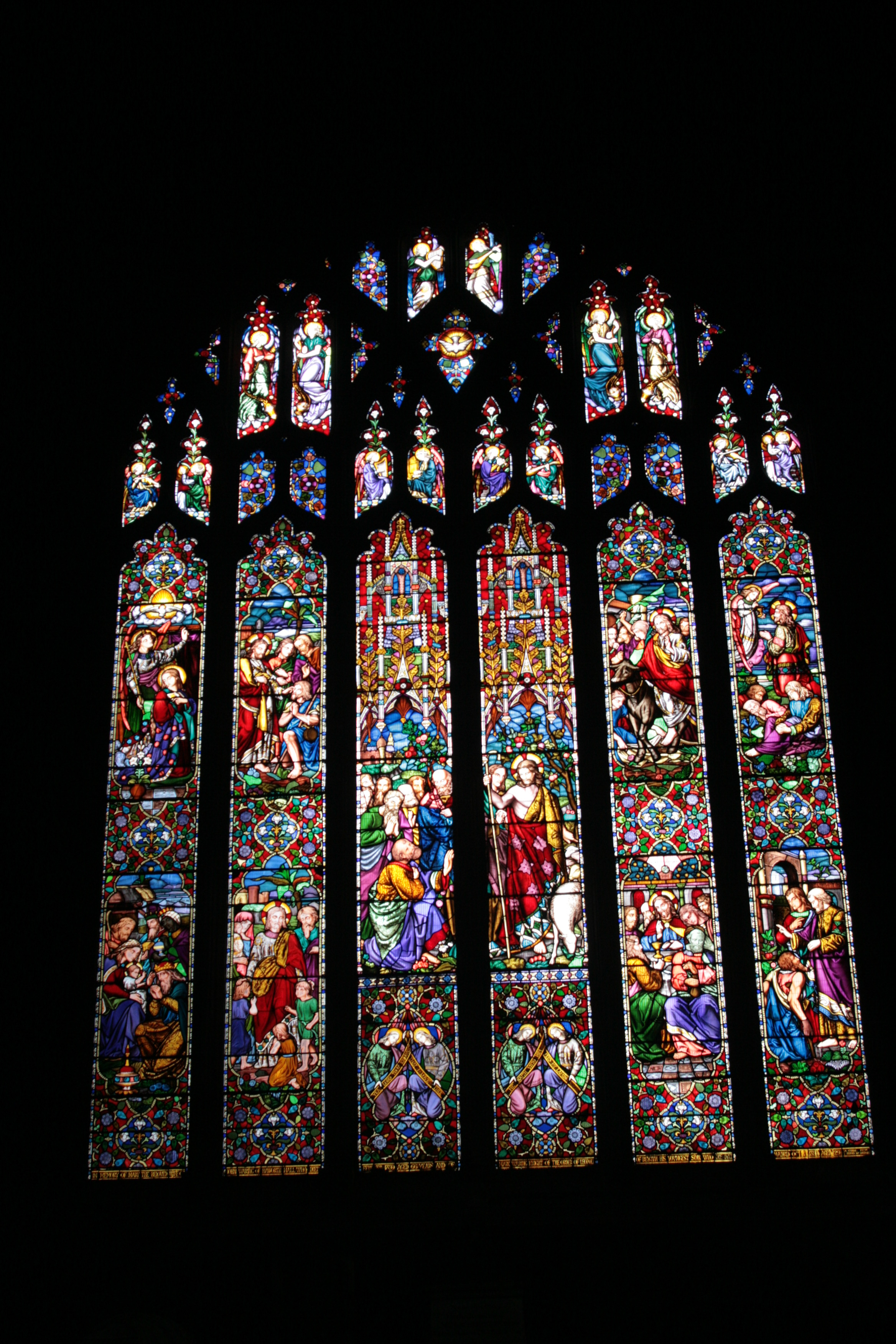
South transept window

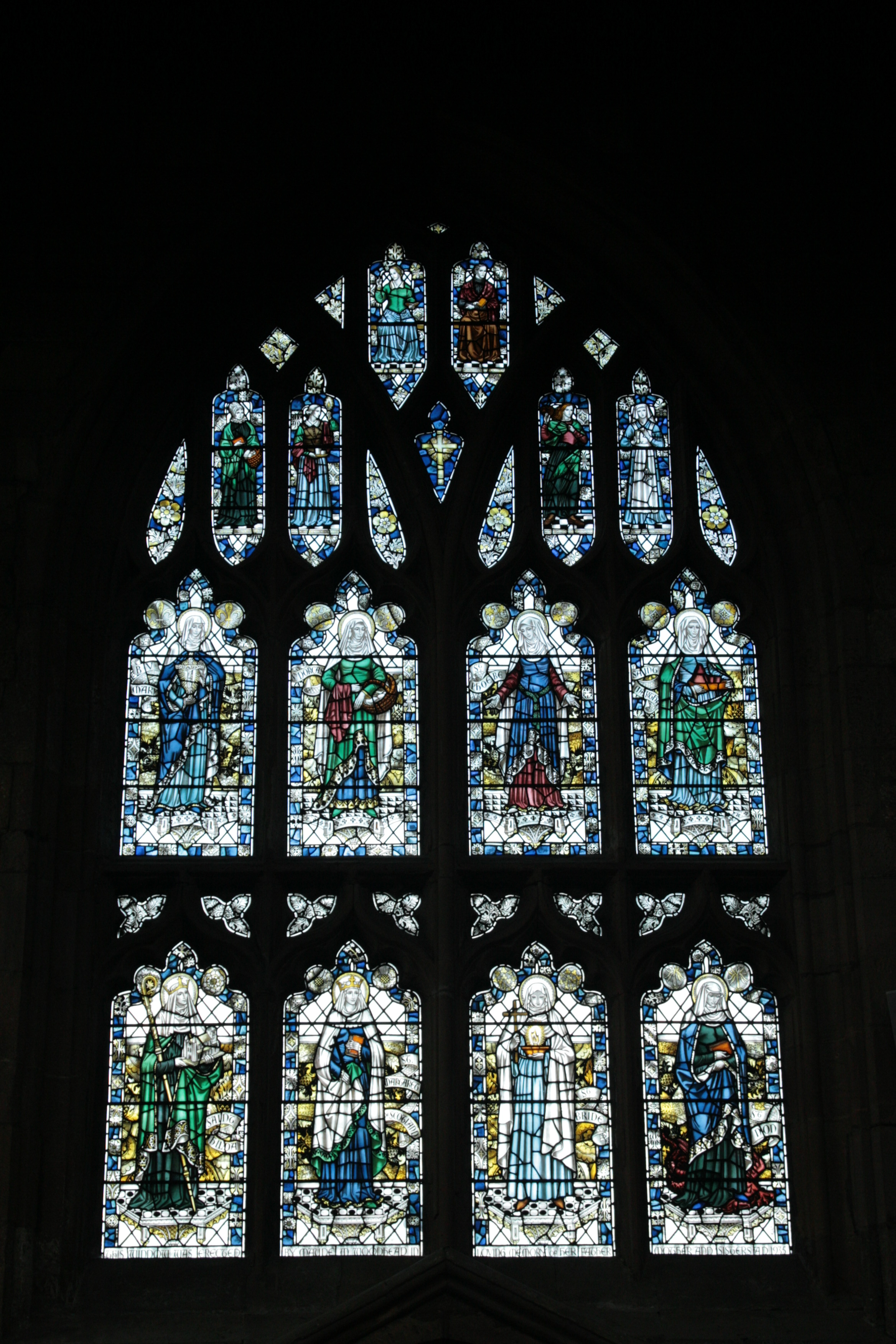
Nave aisle window

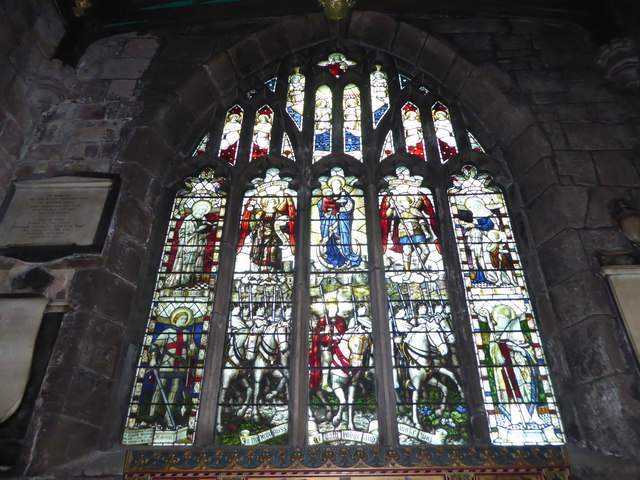
Jesus Chapel window

==== Ceilings and vaults ====
One of the Minster's treasures is the fine nave roof, which dates back to the 15th century and features 77 carved roof bosses, restored in 1976. The chancel also has a fine early 16th century roof with carvings, the bosses depicting the Tudor Rose. The roof of the Jesus Chapel has been painted dark blue.

Underneath the central tower is an "immense" fan vault, constructed in 1420. Originally, when constructed, the window openings were above the level of the arms of the church, bringing light from outside to within the crossing, but since the reconstruction of all four arms in the 15th and 16th centuries, the window openings are now below the level of the roof.

==== Fittings ====
===== Misericords and choir stalls =====
There are two surviving medieval misericords in the first bay of the chancel dating from 1483. Both of these misericords have a carved head of a man beneath a corbel shaped bracket, one with curled hair and one with horns. There are several intricately carved 15th century pews within the chancel, each of which has a poppy head carved on the bench end telling the story of the nativity. New choir stalls were installed under the crossing in the early 21st century, traditional in style but constructed from fresh limewood, whose light colour contrasts with the deep colours of the original stalls in the chancel.

The Minster has two fonts, a newer red sandstone font in the nave, made in memory of Vicar William Newton, who died during Scott's restoration, aged 42. It has an elaborate cover in the shape of a church steeple. The original Norman font, the only major surviving part of the Norman building, is now in the Jesus Chapel. Other notable fittings include an exceptionally intricate octagonal pulpit, dating from 1604 and complete with a wine-glass shaped canopy, and a large brass lectern in the shape of an eagle, given to celebrate the completion of Scott's restoration.

===== Memorials and monuments =====
There are numerous monuments and memorials in the Minster, including a memorial to Samuel Buck in the south transept, opposite to a larger memorial called "Faith", remembering the fifty victims of a maritime disaster at nearby Masborough in 1841. A dresser tomb exists in the north chapel dedicated to Robert Swift and Anne Swift, ancestors of Jonathan Swift, author of Gulliver's Travels. There is a brass memorial to the victims of the First World War in Rotherham, located in the south wall, above which is a statue of St George slaying the dragon. Other notable memorials and burials include to Robert Dyson and to the members of the York and Lancaster Regiment in the First World War.

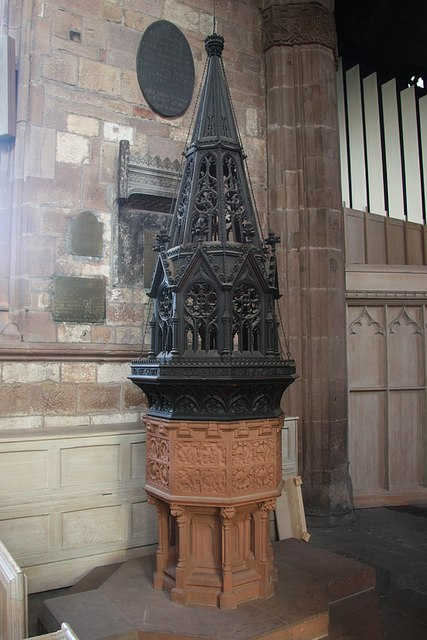
Victorian font with cover

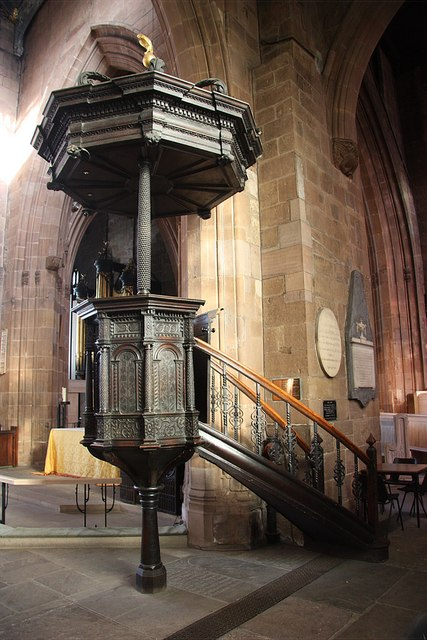
The pulpit of 1604, with its canopy from 1700.

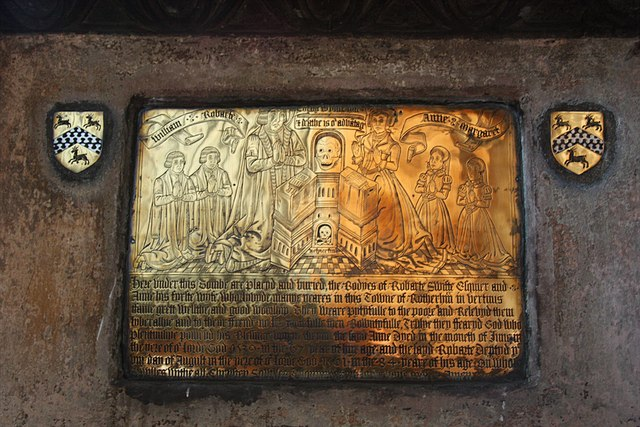
Memorial to Robert and Anne Swift

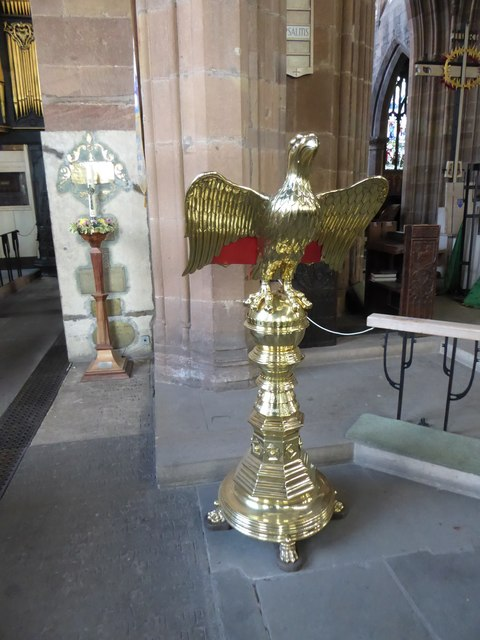
Lectern

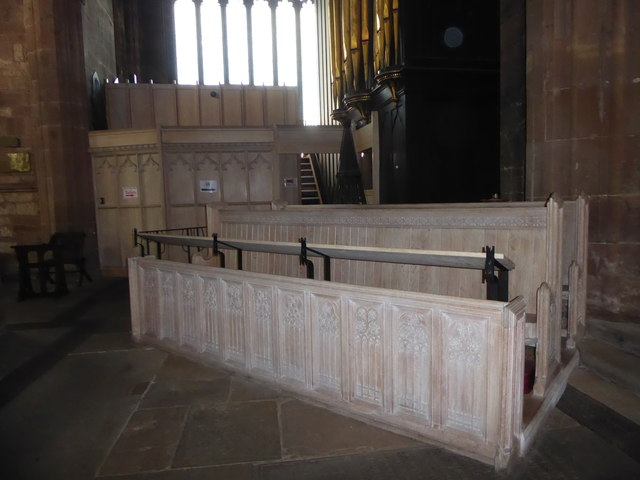
New choir stalls in the crossing

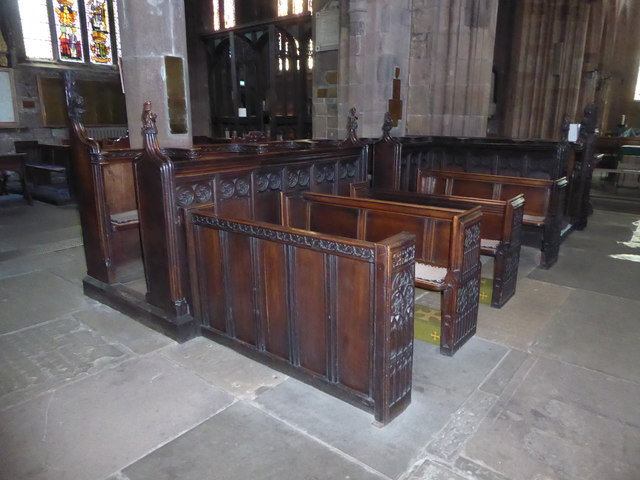
15th century pews in chancel

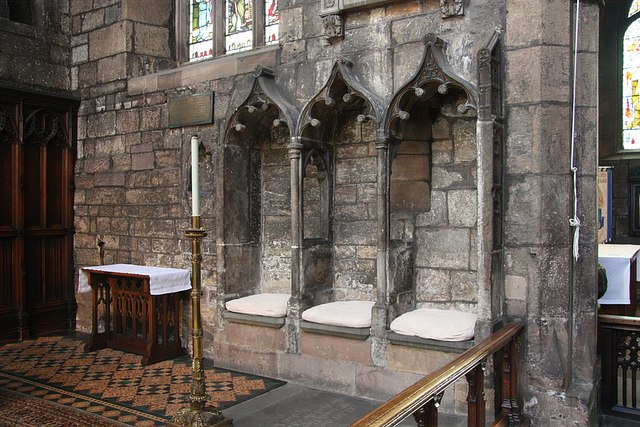
Sedilla in the chancel

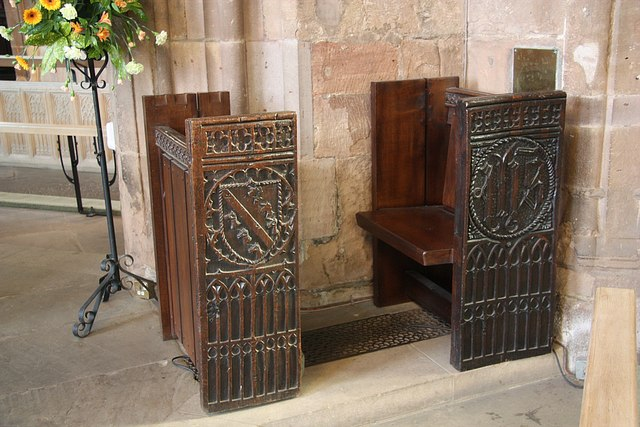
Misericord at entrance to chancel

=== Dimensions ===
- Length of church (internal): 147 feet
- Spire height: 180 feet (55 m)
- Area: 1,153 square metres (12,410 sq ft)

== Organ ==
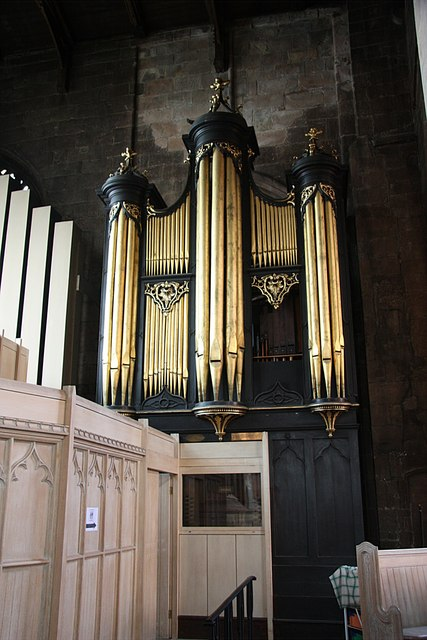
The 1777 Snetzler organ

Rotherham Minster has two organs, only one of which is operational. The older and more prominent organ dates back to 1777 and was manufactured by Johann Snetzler, funded by public subscription. The instrument as originally built was formed of three manuals with 57 keys each, no pedalboard. It was originally installed on a gallery on the chancel arch but was moved in 1843 to the north transept, with a small number of additions. The organ was substantially rebuilt and enlarged during 1890 by Abbott & Smith. The organ received further work and enlargements in 1902 after water damage, 1905 by Gray & Davison and 1950 by an unidentified company. The organ had a further rebuild in 1972 and was enlarged using pipework from the redundant Tiviot Dale Methodist Church in Stockport, completed with a new console.

The Snetzler organ has been unusable since the beginning of the 2010s, as it requires a major restoration to be restored to working order, though the pipework and organ case remains visible in the north transept. The Snetzler organ was replaced in 2011 by a digital organ, a Rodgers Trillium Masterpiece, formed of three manuals. It was purchased from St Alban's Cathedral in Hertfordshire following the completion of their organ restoration programme. It was re-voiced upon arrival at Rotherham to better suit the building.

== Bells ==
The earliest record of bells is to be found in the will of William Greyhern, who was the first provost of the College of Jesus in the town. He died in 1501 and left 6s 8d to the four bells of Rotherham. In 1704 the largest of these four bells either cracked or broke, and was recast at a cost of more than £50. By 1752, information in the present ringing room suggests there were six bells since a half peal was rung in 1 hour and 20 minutes.

In 1812, these had either been recast or augmented to eight, the tenor weighing 24cwt. Only eight years later in 1820, the tenor cracked again, so the whole ring of eight were recast and augmented to ten for the sum of £704 by Whitechapel in 1821. The final peal on the old peal of eight bells was rung on 19 February 1821, and consisted of 5040 changes of Plain Bob Major, rung in 3h 20m.

The new ring of ten were cast by Thomas Mears II of Whitechapel, and were maiden bells, that is, bells with no tuning. At a meeting of the Church Bell Committee in April 1821, plans were laid out for the opening of this new ring of ten. The decided format included the Rotherham ringers were to start ringing at 7am on Easter Monday. Twelve-bell ringers then had priority entrance and had to ballot for entrance, followed by priority for ten and eight bell ringers. No more than 5040 changes were to be rung by any one band on the first day. The bells were not to be rung after 9pm, so the report states. The opening continued over Tuesday too, and during the two days, the town was host to visitors from all over the country, so the Sheffield Iris newspaper reported. The first peal on these bells was Grandsire Caters rung on 20 December 1821, also in 3h 20m.

These bells remained until a restoration in 1924–1925, where all ten bells, frame and fittings were sent to John Taylor & Co in Loughborough for recasting and rehanging. The bells were increased in weight slightly after recasting, the new tenor coming out after tuning as 34.75 long cwt (1,765 kg). The dedication service for this new ring of bells was held on 18 March 1925. The service was said to be “impressive”, as reported in the Ringing World at the time. The new treble bell was rung up during the service and reports describe it as a “sweet, velvety note, reminding one of the pure, clear and poetic beauty of a silvery-voiced choir-boy”.

During the 1924–1925 restoration, the old oak frame was removed – the donors had determined that only the very best should be done; therefore they commissioned Messrs Taylor of Loughborough to recast and rehang the bells on modern principles, and a new steel and iron frame was specifically designed to suit the tower. Massive steel girders now brace and bond the walls, forming at the same time a foundation for the future augmentation to twelve, which took place in 1986 (see below). The first peal on the new ring of ten was 5148 Grandsire Caters on 29 December 1925.

In the late 1950s, the then Ringing Master, Norman Chaddock, acted on advice he received from Fred Sharpe and had a sound control system installed. Since that time, the bells have been readily available for bookings, and peal ringing has been popular ever since. During Chaddock's time, Rotherham became a teaching band, a policy that is still in use today. During the 1980s, the band grew and the average age of recruits got lower, so for the 60th anniversary of the bells in 1984, the local band decided to finish the original job by augmenting them to twelve, which would also give a light front eight for teaching. The two new bells were cast in 1986 by John Taylor & Co of Loughborough and matched the original ten perfectly. Because of the new sound control, there were 334 peals on the original ten between 1925 and 1986, and the first peal on the 12 was of Grandsire Cinques on 18 August 1986, with the first Maximus following a few months later. The 1000th peal in the tower was rung on 19 March 2017 and consisted of 5040 changes of Yorkshire Surprise Maximus, rung in 3 hours and 29 minutes.

The bells have had no major work to them since. They are regarded as one of the finest peals of bells in the UK and are popular with visiting bands, especially from within Yorkshire.

In 2022 a sharp second semitone bell was added to the ring, allowing a light ring of eight.

== See also ==
- Grade I listed buildings in South Yorkshire
- Listed buildings in Rotherham (Boston Castle Ward)
