= Halesowen Abbey =

Premonstratensian abbey in Halesowen, England

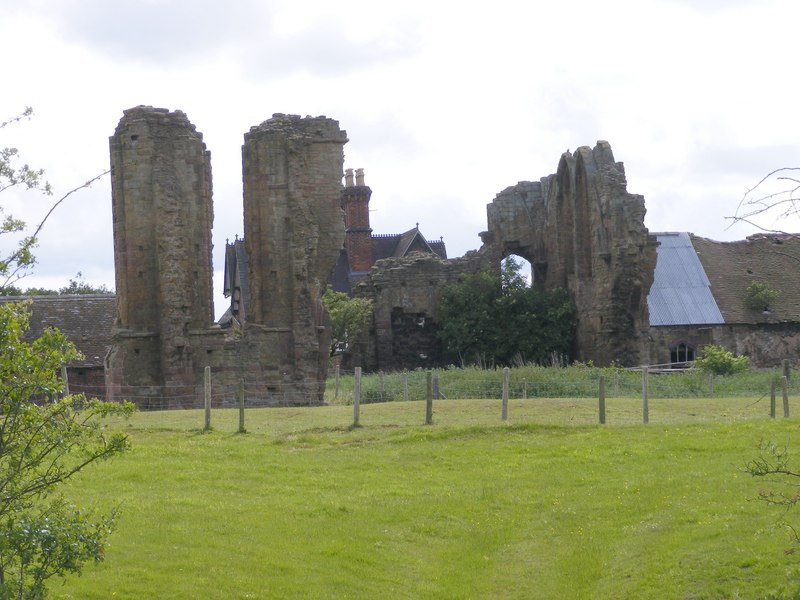
- The ruins of Halesowen Abbey.

- Location within West Midlands county

Monastery information
- Other name: Abbey of Hales
- Order: Premonstratensian
- Established: 1218
- Disestablished: 9 June 1538
- Mother house: Welbeck Abbey
- Dedication: The Blessed Virgin Mary for the Feast of the Assumption and St John the Evangelist.
- Diocese: Diocese of Worcester
- Controlled churches: Halesowen; Walsall; Wednesbury; Harborne; Clent; Rowley Regis; Cradley; Warley Wigorn; Lutley

People
- Founders: Peter des Roches, Bishop of Winchester

Site
- Location: Halesowen, West Midlands, B62 8RJ
- Coordinates: 52.4436°N 2.0368°W
- Grid reference: grid reference SO 97724 82701
- Visible remains: Parts of the north wall of the presbytery, the south transept and the south aisle, the south range of the cloister. Vestiges of water control features, including mills.

Scheduled monument
- Official name: Halesowen Abbey and associated water control features
- Designated: 8 February 1915
- Reference no.: 1009770

Listed Building – Grade I
- Official name: St Mary's Abbey Ruins, Manor Farm
- Designated: 10 January 1950
- Reference no.: 1063731
- Public access: Visible from nearby footpath. No direct access.

Arms of Halesowen Abbey

Halesowen Abbey was a Premonstratensian abbey in Halesowen, England of which only ruins remain. Founded by Peter des Roches with a grant of land from King John, the abbey's official year of inauguration was 1218. It acquired two daughter abbeys and a dependent priory. It also acquired a considerable range of estates, mostly concentrated within the region, and many churches, which it appropriated after being granted the advowsons. The abbey's manorial court records have survived in large part, portraying a discontented community, driven to many acts of resistance and at one point to challenge the abbey's very existence. The abbey played no great part in the affairs of its order, although it was represented at all levels. At least one abbot attracted serious criticism from within the order, which attempted to remove him. Its canons observed the Rule of St Augustine to a varying degree, with some serious lapses, at least in the late 15th century, when the order's visitor uncovered widespread sexual exploitation of local women. The abbey was moderately prosperous and survived the suppression of the lesser monasteries. It was dissolved in 1538.

== Foundation and early years ==
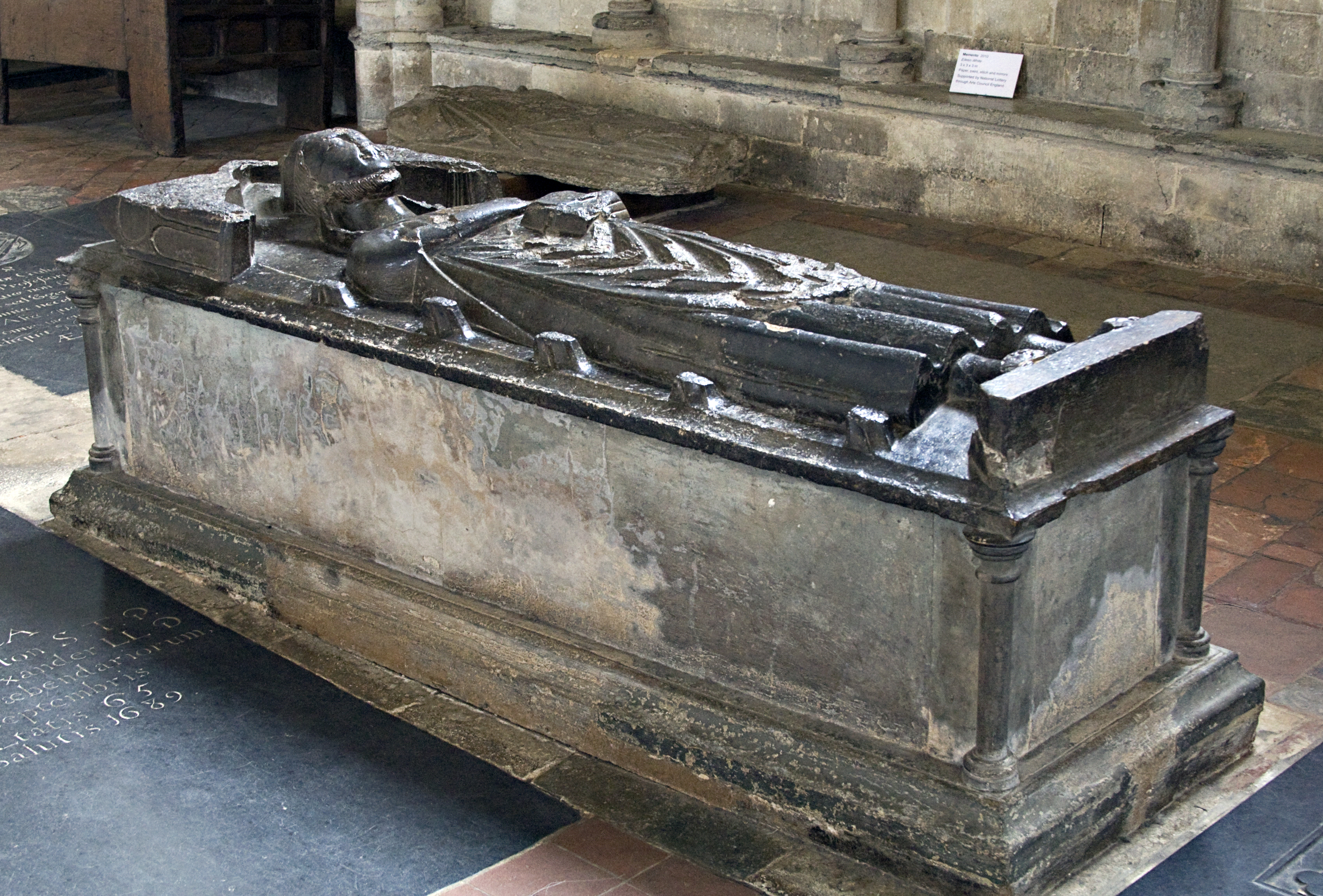
Tomb of Peter des Roches in Winchester Cathedral.

Halesowen Abbey originated in a grant of the manor of Hales in 1214 by King John to Peter des Roches, then Bishop of Winchester, intended to allow Peter to found a religious house "of whatever order he pleased". On 27 October of that year the king issued instructions through letters close to the Sheriff of Staffordshire to give the bishop full seisin of the manor and all that pertained to it. The following year John issued a charter confirming the manor in frankalmoin to the "canons of the Premonstratensian order resident at Hales" (apud Hales).

However, the official date for the foundation of Halesowen Abbey, as given by the Premonstratensian order, is 1218, at least three years after the canons regular, known as "White Canons" because of their habit, had set up a community at Halesowen. Such apparent disparities were common with Premonstratensian houses and stem from religious and theological attitudes specific to the order. (Note: cf for example Dale Abbey, where the stated date of the foundation, 15 August 1204, is at least five years later than the establishment of a successful Premonstratensian community at Dale.) In monastic orders, generally an abbey requires a chapter of at least 13, so that there can be an abbot or "father" and twelve canons. (Note: This rested on a typological view of Christ and the Twelve Apostles, and more anciently, the Twelve Tribes of Israel.) Moreover, it seems likely that the Premonstratensians did not count an abbey as fully established until there was an abbey church to consecrate. Finally, several of the later abbeys were dedicated not simply to Mary, mother of Jesus, but specifically, as at Dale (Stanley Park) Abbey ad festum Assumptionis — "for the Feast of the Assumption," so the abbey would not be inaugurated until the next occurrence of the festival (15 August) after the gathering of a sufficient number in church. All of this could lead to considerable delays. The basic facts about the foundation and dedication of an abbey were established in advance by Bishop Redman, abbot of Shap Abbey, before he carried out regular canonical visitations of Premonstratensian houses in 1478. The text of replies to his preliminary enquiries for that year's visitation of Halesowen:

Cenobium de Hales Owen
in [comitatu Salop, et] diocesi Wygornie.
Anno Domini MCCXVIII.
A domino Petro de Rupibus, episcopo Wyntonie fundatum est.
In honore B. Marie Virginia ad festum Assumptionis, et S. Johannis Evangeliste.
Abbas de Welbek est pater abbas.
Et sexto kalendas Maii, feria quinta, eodem anno, venerunt canonici de Welbek ad monasterium de Hales.
Filia eius est cenobium de Tychfeilde.
Tres habet ecclesias quarum canonici sunt vicarii perpetui.
Episcopus Wyntonie est fundator.

Translation:

Community of Halesowen
in the county of Shropshire and the diocese of Worcester
A.D. 1218
It was founded by Master Peter of the Rocks, Bishop of Winchester,
in honour of the Blessed Virgin Mary for the Feast of the Assumption, and of St John the Evangelist.
The abbot of Welbeck is the father abbot,
and on the sixth of May (the fifth weekday) of that year canons from Welbeck came to Hales.
Its daughter house is the community of Titchfield.
It has three churches, of which canons are the perpetual vicars.
The bishop of Winchester is the founder/patron.

The acceptance of the abbot of Welbeck Abbey in Nottinghamshire as the father abbot of Halesowen, and its basis in a colonisation from that abbey on 6 May 1218, suggests a reason for the delayed formal foundation of the abbey. King John's confirmatory charter of 1215 had implied that there was already a Premonstratensian community at Halesowen, although it did not mention where the canons had come from. If there was an early Premonstratensian settlement at the site by 1215, it seems that further colonisation from Welbeck was needed to bring the numbers up to the requisite level. Certainly, substantial building work was underway in 1218, as Peter des Roches received a royal grant of £17 3s. 4d. to meet its costs. Although the exact date of the foundation is nowhere stated, Halesowen was likely consecrated on the Feast of the Assumption in 1218, early in the reign of Henry III.

Building and possibly rebuilding continued for some years, as early in 1223 Brian de Lisle was instructed to have made for the bishop sixty copula de cablecio from the royal Forest of Kinver for the "refurbishment of his church of Hales." Evidently, the matter was considered important, as a second set of more detailed instructions was issued to Brian on 23 May, raising the possibility of buying the items ready-made. Although the Victoria County History account mentions the grant, it does not explain what the items actually were. Copula de cablecio suggests some sort of couplings or ties, possibly rafters, joists or other structural members. In connection with the grant of wood, instructions were also issued to Brian on 5 June to procure for the abbey, with minimal damage to the woodland, sufficient wood for four fires to melt lead, indicating that roof work was underway: rather than a repair, this was perhaps lead covering to replace an earlier, temporary roof.

A charter of Henry III confirmed the status and possessions of Halesowen Abbey on 5 April 1227. In particular, the grant of the manor of Halesowen was reiterated, and it was made clear that the abbey was answerable to the bishop of Winchester and his successors as patrons.

== Daughter houses ==
=== Titchfield ===
Peter des Roches went on to found another Premonstratensian house, Titchfield Abbey in Hampshire. This was colonised with canons from Halesowen and given the same dedication as Halesowen. The date is given in some sources, including Victoria County History, as 1222, but the convent's reply to a question from Bishop Redman on the subject was that the foundation date was 1231, which agrees with the foundation charter, dated the 16th year of Henry III. Redman's pro forma also elicited a confirmation that the abbot of Halesowen was the father abbot of Tichfield.

=== Talley ===
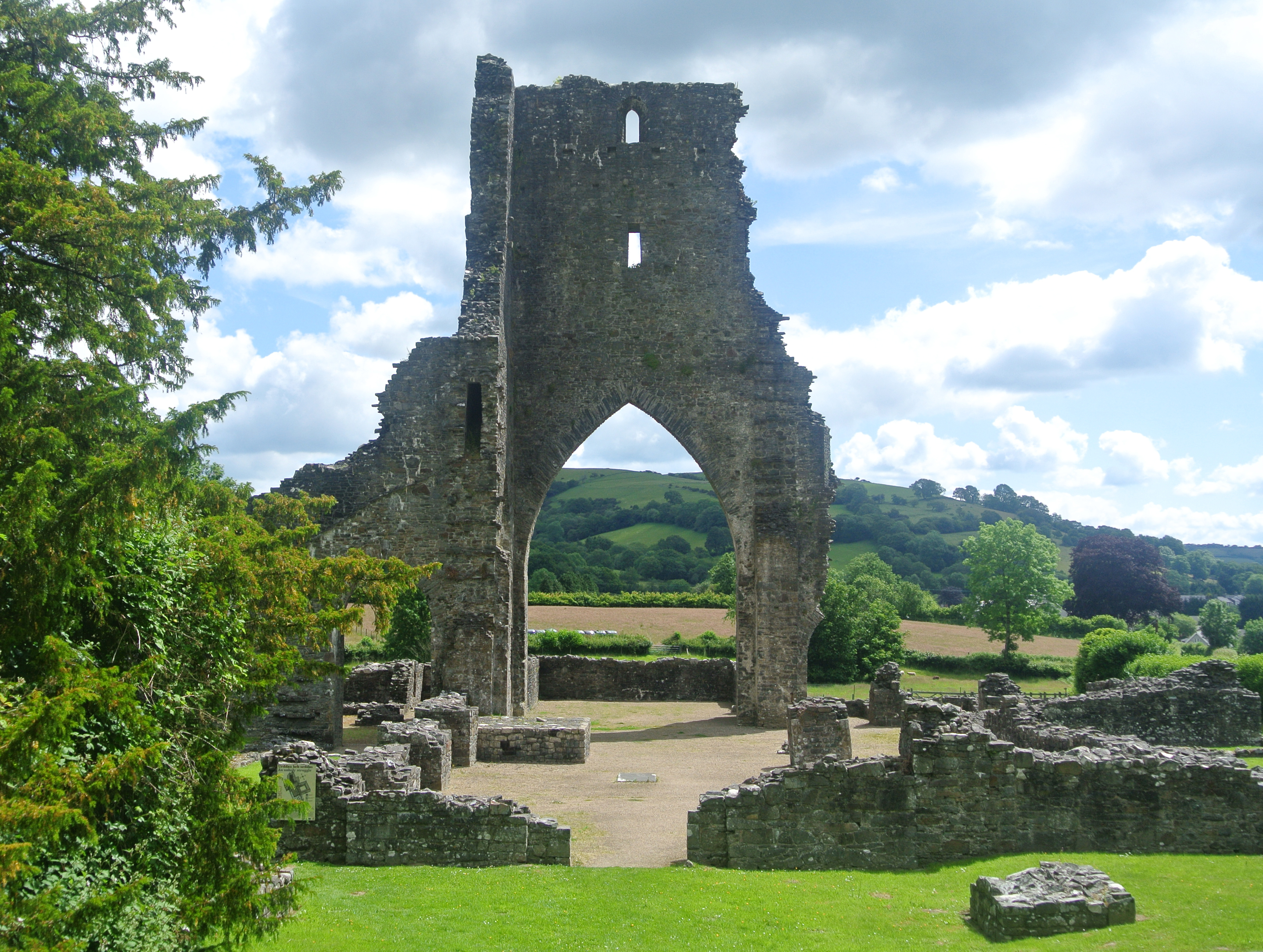
Ruins of Talley Abbey

Talley Abbey (Welsh: Abaty Talyllychau) was about two decades older than Halesowen Abbey, founded towards the end of the 12th century by Rhys ap Gruffydd Originally it was subject to St. John the Baptist's Abbey, Amiens. It suffered greatly as a result of constant warfare in its first century. In 1291, the head of the order, William, Abbot of Prémontré Abbey, requested Edward I to assist the abbots of Halesowen and Newsham Abbey in making a canonical visitation. This fitted well with the king's policy of bringing Welsh religious houses more closely under domination from England. The patron of Talley was Rhys ap Maredudd, one of the most intractable of the Welsh opponents of the English monarchy, who died in 1292. In a letter dated that year, the abbot of Prémontré refers to the will of the king and to the advantages and peace that would surround the abbey, as a result of his reassignment of Talley to Welbeck Abbey, making the abbot of the Nottinghamshire house and his successors the father abbots of the Welsh house.

Uncertainty still surrounds the rôles played by Halesowen and Welbeck Abbeys in relation to Talley. Abbots of Halesowen played a part in three of four known visitations at Talley. In 1410, Antipope John XXIII granted an indult to Talley to prevent visitors requiring the canons to travel for more than a day to meetings: previously, they had been travelling about 80 miles, despite the impoverishment of the abbey from constant incursions by armed bands. After an inquiry into the matter, the abbot of Welbeck resigned the paternity of Talley Abbey to Halesowen in a letter of 20 August 1414. A letter from Hubert, Abbot of Prémontré, dated 18 April 1475, explains to Bishop Redman that Talley Abbey was transferred to Halesowen because of the distance separating it from St. John the Baptist's Abbey in Amiens. A search of the documents had found no mention of Welbeck in this context, which suggests that its claim might have been based on a forgery. Despite the difficulties of travel, the abbot of Talley attended a provincial chapter meeting, covering all the order's abbeys in Britain and Ireland, at Lincoln in July 1476 In 1478, Redman's set questions preceding the visitation elicited the answer from the convent of Talley that Abbas de Hales-owen est pater abbas — "the abbot of Halesowen is the father abbot." Gribbin suggests that the questions, which were asked of all convents that year, were devised precisely because Redman was unsure of the situation at Talley. Nevertheless, a provincial chapter meeting, probably held in 1479 at Leicester, considered the "dubious paternity" of Talley, which Redman was investigating. In December 1485 Redman dealt with a canon who wanted to transfer from Cockersand Abbey to Talley and saw fit to bring the abbot of Welbeck into the process, perhaps to cover himself against future challenges. When Redman made a visitation of Talley Abbey in 1497, he met the abbot, not at the abbey in Wales but at Halesowen, and, as he was newly elected, received his vow of obedience to the abbot of Prémontré. Redman was sufficiently well-informed to order the abbot to attend to urgent repairs. It seems that the issue had been settled at last in favour of Halesowen.

=== Dodford ===
Halesowen Abbey absorbed the Augustine Dodford Priory in 1464, by letters patent of Edward IV. At this point, the convent of Dodford had dwindled to a single canon, Thomas Tipton, who was therefore the prior at the time of dissolution. The king's reference to the "decrease of fruits and profits" makes clear that the priory was in financial difficulties. The priory was founded in the reign of Henry II, but its oldest extant foundation document is an inspeximus charter, which also dates from the 16th year of Henry III, 1231–2. Although Brother Thomas Cooksey, a canon of Halesowen was consistently accorded the title "prior of Dodford" in 1488, 1491 and 1494, he was no more than the custos, keeper, of Dodford in 1497. Halesowen came to treat the former priory as a mere monastic cell and exploited its resources efficiently, bringing about a substantial increase in revenues. In 1500, neither Cooksey nor any other member of the community was named as responsible for Dodford, which had dwindled to the status of one of Halesowen's estates. In 1505, Cooksey reappeared as prior, at the head of a fictional Dodford community, which was simply a list of Halesowen's canons. In 1535, the demesne land and leases at Dodford together brought in the substantial sum of £24 3s. 1d.

== Abbots of Halesowen ==
=== Abbots within the order ===
Premonstratensian abbeys in England and Wales: paternity and dependence

Based on similar tree diagrams in Holliday and Gasquet, and with reference to Gribbin. The chart lists Premonstratensian houses in England and Wales, in the late 15th century, except for Orford or Irford Priory a small Nottinghamshire house of canonesses which was of unknown affiliation. Both abbeys and priories were generally affiliated to the house that founded them, but this was not always so: in some cases paternity was attributed elsewhere or altered subsequently. A solid line links each abbey to the abbey of its "father abbot" in a row above. The line of paternity from Prémontré Abbey to Halesowen and beyond is highlighted with yellow boxes. Dependent priories are linked to the mother house with dashed lines. Dates of foundation are those given by convents when questioned by Bishop Redman in 1478, if available; otherwise, as estimated by Gasquet or the editors of Victoria County History.

Prémontré Abbey; 1120
Licques Abbey; 1132	St. Radegund's or Bradsole Abbey; 1192—3	Bayham Abbey; 1200
Newsham Abbey; 1148
Broadholme Priory; By 1154
Alnwick Abbey; 1147	St Agatha's or Easby Abbey; 1152	Welbeck Abbey; 1153	Barlings Abbey; 1154	Sulby Abbey; 1155	Croxton Abbey; 1162	Beeleigh Abbey; 1180	Tupholme Abbey; By 1190	Newbo Abbey; 1198	Dale Abbey; 1204	Coverham Abbey; 1212
Egglestone Abbey c. 1200	Lavendon Abbey; By 1180	Hornby Priory c. 1200	Blanchland Abbey; Before 1190	Cockersand Abbey c. 1190
Langley Abbey; 1195	Guyzance Priory c. 1150	Shap Abbey c. 1200
Wendling Abbey c. 1265	Hagnaby Abbey; 1175	Leiston Abbey; 1183	Beauchief Abbey; 1183	West Dereham Abbey; 1188	Torre Abbey; 1196	Dureford Abbey; By 1217	Halesowen Abbey; 1218
Langdon Abbey; 1212	Titchfield Abbey; 1231	Talley Abbey; By 1197	Dodford Priory probably 1180s

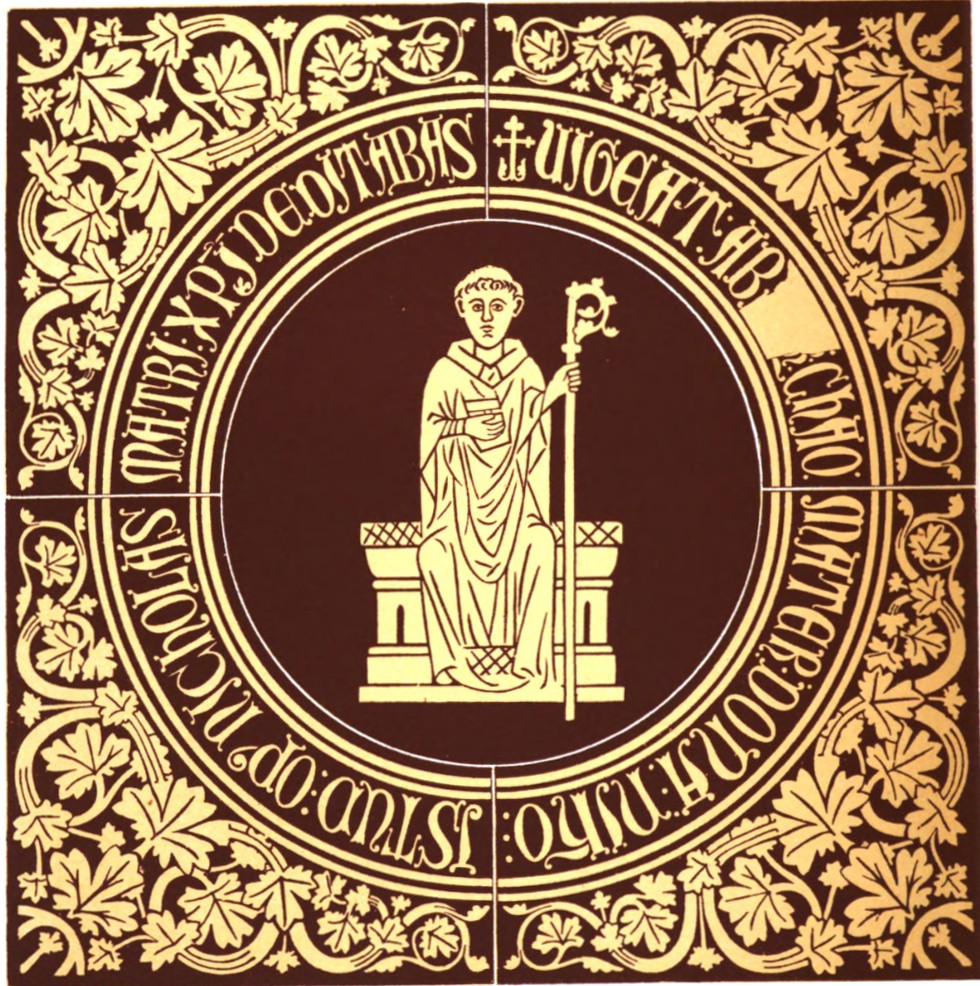
Floor tiles from Halesowen Abbey, as reconstructed by J. R. Holliday, showing an abbot, Nicholas, thought to be from the reign of Edward I. The lettering reads: ISTUD OPUS NICHOLAS MATRI CHRISTI DEDIT ABBAS VIGEAT ABSQUE CHAO MATER DONA NICHOLAO - This work Abbot Nicholas gave to the Mother of Christ that he might flourish without confusion.

Premonstratensian Abbeys of the English Middle Circaria

Halesowen's abbots were the main channel connecting the convent to the wider Premonstratensian (Norbertine) order. The paternal links between abbeys provided a hierarchical structure of supervision and discipline. As Halesowen was a daughter house of Welbeck Abbey, it was subject to canonical visitation and correction by the abbot of the mother house. The abbot of Halesowen was himself "father abbot" to Titchfield and, later, to Talley and Dodford, and was obliged to carry out annual canonical visitations and to supervise and formally confirm the election of their heads. In 1370, for example, Richard de Hampton, Abbot of Halesowen, provided John Thorny, newly elected as abbot of Titchfield, with a letter confirming his election, which he took to William of Wykeham, Bishop of Winchester and patron of both abbeys. This initiated the benediction of Thorny at the episcopal manor, a more intimate context than the cathedral. In 1390, Abbot Richard, now old, wrote a similar letter to secure the benediction of Thorny's successor, John Romsey. In 1420, Abbot John Poole of Halesowen travelled to Titchfield Abbey to perform two tasks: to attend to the confirmation and benediction of Richard Aubrey as abbot of the daughter hose and to carry out a canonical visitation. He was assisted by John Ultyng, Abbot of Dureford Abbey in Sussex, a short distance east of Titchfield. The visitation, signed off on 12 June, seems to have concentrated on accounting for Titchfield's assets and liabilities. There was no cash in the treasury, and the debts came to £62 0s. 6d., although the house was owed £43 4s. The valuables in the sacristry and treasury were counted: one silver-gilt ciborium, two large silver-gilt chalices and twelve others, of which six were gilded, a large Gospel book adorned with various relics, a silver-gilt vessel set on feet and filled with relics, a large silver-gilt cross with images of Mary and St John, set on a large stand, and so on, to the 84 silver spoons. The livestock on various manors was also counted: 34 horses, 10 draught horses, 4 colts, 154 oxen, 7 bulls, 69 cows, 17 heifers (young cows), 10 bullocks (young and or castrated bulls), 28 yearlings, 29 calves, 381 muttons, 207 hurtis et muricis, 121 hoggets, 100 lambs, 17 boars, 24 sows, 33 pigs, 126 hogs (castrated male pigs, and 89 suckling pigs. It is possible this precise accounting was to establish a marker for the new abbacy.

The order did not work solely through vertical, hierarchical structures. Even when the paternal links were invoked, major interventions almost always involved at least one other abbot: in the case of the attempt to remove Abbot Walter, it was the father abbot and two others. When an election was needed at Dale in 1332, the responsibility to supervise it fell naturally to the abbot of Newsham Abbey, the father abbot. However, he sent as his representatives the abbots of Halesowen and Langdon. Both were in the paternal line from Newsham, the oldest Premonstratensian house in England, although only two English abbeys were not. There were horizontal links of support and consultation that took the form of the unique Premonstratensian circaria system, which grouped abbeys within a region. In its completed form, this placed Halesowen in the English Middle Circaria, which stretched from Lincolnshire to Shropshire, and beyond into South Wales. In 1311, when the English abbeys were caught between the demands of Prémontré and the king over the subsidies issue, they organised against Adam, the head of the order, based on the circaria: the abbots of Croxton Abbey and Newsham wrote to all the Middle English abbeys to raise funds for an appeal to Rome, including Halesowen's 14 shillings in the list of required contributions. When war brought Prémontré into serious hardship in 1354, the abbot of Halesowen was chosen as one of the representatives of the English Middle Circaria to discuss the issue at Grantham.

Abbots of Halesowen also sometimes took on similar representative functions at the Provincial Chapter, a triennial meeting of all the abbots of the order in Britain and Ireland, which always began with the selection of the definitors, a steering committee. Abbot Thomas Bridges of Halesowen is known to have taken this rôle at two consecutive chapters: at Grantham in 1492 and at Lincoln in 1495 Sometimes the abbot of Halesowen would attend the General Chapter of the order at Prémontré. In 1327, for example, with strict conditions in force designed to prevent the transfer of subsidies to Prémontré, abbots attending the meeting were forced to apply for permission and to specify the amount of money they were carrying. On 1 September, orders were issued from Nottingham to Bartholomew Burghersh, the constable of Dover Castle, to permit the abbots of Halesowen and West Dereham Abbeys to cross the Channel with their entourages, with 20 marks each for expenses.

=== Abbatial elections ===
Abbots played a crucial part in the installation of other abbots, although Premonstratensian houses elected their own abbots, so long as they could agree on the right man. There was no formal vote, as the election process was expected to produce a candidate acceptable to all. The earliest election at Halesowen of which details are extant was one of those in which the canons could not agree. Held on 17 June 1322, it was supervised by Richard de Nottingham, Abbot of Welbeck and father abbot of Halesowen. He was assisted by the abbot of a house abbreviated to T, which narrows the possibilities to Tupholme Abbey or Torre Abbey. The election probably followed the resignation of Abbot Bartholomew. After celebrating the Mass of the Holy Spirit, the entire convent of the abbey retired with the two abbots to the chapter house, where they sang the Veni Creator Spiritus, "Come Creator Spirit." After initial discussion, the canons unanimously decided to accept an election by way of compromission, a commonly used procedure in which the decision was delegated to a panel chosen by the convent as a whole. This took place under the leadership of Henry, the prior of Halesowen. However, the issue proved intractable, and the choice ultimately devolved on the abbot of Welbeck, acting in his pastoral capacity. He nominated Thomas de Lech, who was generally accepted. After singing the Te Deum with the chapter, Abbot Richard led them out into the choir of the abbey church, where he seated Thomas in the first choir stall, conferred paternal authority on him, and installed him in the church and its possessions.

The way of compromission was followed with greater success on 9 March 1486, after the death of Abbot John Derby. On this occasion, the father abbot from Welbeck was accompanied by the abbot of Beauchief. It seems that the convent quickly agreed on a panel empowered to carry out the election: the subprior Thomas Bridge, Henry Edgbaston, Richard Hill, John Saunders, Thomas Cockseye, and John Birmingham. They were given from 11:00 to 13:00 to make a decision. Before the time had elapsed, Richard Hill was authorised to announce that Bridge had been elected abbot, to unanimous approval. The visiting abbots made a diligent examination of the process and could find nothing wrong with either the election or the man chosen, so they took him into the church for installation in his seat.

Over two centuries, the essentials of the process did not change, although on 4 July 1505, it reached a swift conclusion because there was little to discuss. Thomas Wilkinson, Abbot of Welbeck, was accompanied to Halesowen by the abbot of Dale, Richard Nottingham, after the death of Thomas Bridge. Once again, proceedings began with the Mass of the Holy Spirit and a procession to the chapter house, where Wilkinson solemnly warned any who were excommunicated, suspended, or under interdict to withdraw before the election commenced. There followed an invocation of the Holy Spirit. It seems that Edmund Green, prior of Hornby, a small Lancashire dependency of Croxton Abbey, immediately emerged as favourite. After the convent and the visiting abbots had assured themselves that his reputation and holiness of life were of the required standard, Wilkinson and Nottingham approved, ratified, and confirmed his election and affixed their seals to the election return. The convent and the abbots returned to the church and sang Te Deum laudamus.

=== Attempted deposition ===
The outstanding case of the deposition, or attempted deposition, of an abbot of Halesowen occurred in 1311, when Walter de la Flagge was abbot. In 1310 Abbot Adam of Prémontré, presumably acting on rumours or reports he had received, had instructed the abbots of Dale and Langdon to carry out a visitation of Halesowen Abbey, taking with them the abbot of Welbeck: they were to correct abuses and be prepared to force the resignation of the abbot if necessary. They were to use ecclesiastical powers to put down rebellion, but were authorised to call in the secular arm if necessary. The situation was complicated by a conflict between the king and the Premonstratensian order over subsidies that the English abbeys were expected to remit to Prémontré Abbey: money that the king wanted to keep in the country. The king suspected that the visitation was a stratagem for extracting a subsidy and sent a copy of his prohibition of such payments to the abbots of Dale and Langdon on 7 May 1311. However, the visitation went ahead, and the three abbots pronounced the abbot of Halesowen incontinent, uncooperative, incompetent, and unfit to rule, on numerous grounds deserving of excommunication. Brother Lawrence, a deposed abbot of Bayham Abbey, whose offences were not quite defined, was condemned in the most verbose terms as a scandal to the faith. Brother Batholomew of Coventry was a confirmed liar. Brother Robert de Boudon was guilty of incontinence, conspiracy, and violent disturbance of the peace. The prior, they reported, was the son of a cleric (which would have excluded him from the order without special permission), incapable of his office, an open conspirator, and not trusted by the canons to hear confession. Joh Gorscote was in the same mould as the abbot. However, before the visitors could proceed against them, the accused produced the king's prohibition, claiming that it made them immune to their sentence. When the visitors persisted, they were expelled from the abbey. They were even refused accommodation, at their own expense, at one of its granges or farms. They travelled to Dale, where they assured themselves that the king's prohibition did not apply to visitations as such and, on the Nativity of Saint John the Baptist (24 June), pronounced their sentences. The abbot, prior, sub-prior, sacristan, precentor, cellarer and John of Gorscote were solemnly and publicly excommunicated: members of the order were not to communicate with them until they were absolved by the abbot of Prémontré. To signal that this was not just the judgement of the two visitors commissioned by Prémontré, the abbot of Welbeck appended his seal to the document. It is not clear precisely what effect the visitation and the sentences had on the running of Halesowen Abbey. The next known election was not until 1314, when Bartholomew became abbot, so it is possible that the slippery Abbot Walter managed to remain in post for some years.

== Canons of Halesowen ==
=== Numbers ===
Number of canons, including abbot, at Halesowen Abbey as listed in the visitations, 1475–1500.

The clerical population of England seems to have reached a peak by about 1300 and fell greatly during the Black Death. The number of Premonstratensians is thought to have fallen by a little under a third during this disaster. Poll tax returns for Halesowen show only 11 canons at the abbey in 1381. Redman's visitations give lists of canons at not quite regular intervals for the last quarter of the 15th century. Numbers at Halesowen are given in the accompanying column chart.

=== Rôles and responsibilities ===
The Premonstratensian canons of Halesowen were not monks and could take on a wide range of responsibilities both inside and outside their own religious house. Entering the community, sometimes as children, they would progress through a novitiate, under the tutelage of the novice master, until able to make their religious profession as full members, specifically as part of the convent of Halesowen. Alongside this, but distinct from it, was progression through the Holy orders in the Catholic Church: at that time generally acolyte, subdeacon, deacon and priest. The registers of Worcester diocese record some of these ordinations. For example, in the first week of Lent in 1373, William Horwood of Northfield, a canon of Halesowen, was ordained a subdeacon. On the vigil of Trinity Sunday 1419 Thomas Holder of Halesowen convent was ordained a subdeacon during a vacancy in the see by Nicholas Duffield, the abbot of Pershore, who had been recognised as bishop of Dunkeld by the Roman antipopes during the Western Schism. Bishop Redmand's visitation records show individual novices becoming canons and progressing through holy orders. In 1475, the abbey had six novices: Richard Wenlock, John Hales, Edward Clareley, John Seed, Richard Walsall, and Richard Worfield. Three years later, all their names are prefixed by the title Frater, "Brother," indicating that they have made their profession and become full members of the convent. Hales had been appointed cantor or singer of the abbey, although neither he nor Wenlock is otherwise described: possibly both were now priests. Clareley and Seed had now been ordained deacons, with Clareley also made a sub-cantor; Walsall was a subdeacon; Worfield was an acolyte.

The same reports also give examples of the rôles and responsibilities of the more established canons. John Derby stands at the head of the lists as abbot, but next comes Richard Edgbaston, the prior of the abbey. In 1478, he was also described as cellarer, responsible for the abbey's supply of food and drink, and probably also the manager of its manorial court. He was also at that time the sacristan, who took care of the abbey's liturgical vessels and other ceremonial items. He seems to have been the abbot's confidant and factotum, a man trusted with a demanding and important range of tasks, so it is no surprise to find him appointed to the panel that elected John Derby's successor in 1486. In both years, his deputy in managing the day-to-day affairs of the convent was Thomas Nechel, the sub-prior. The same three canons were vicars of controlled churches in both 1475 and 1478: John Comber at Walsall, Richard Hill at Halesowen, and John Hay at Clent. These were priests who exercised pastoral and liturgical functions at the three parish churches and their chapels. Comber is prefixed by the title Magister, Master, in 1475, suggesting academic credentials, and in 1478 it is explained that he is in decretis bacca larius, a graduate in canon law, a distinction which he shares with the abbot. John Hay was vicar of Clent still in 1500, although his incumbency had been interrupted for some years: he was described as a former abbot.

In 1475, one canon, Richard Harborne, was described as a metrista, someone skilled in verse. In 1478, John Saunders is called a circator, one who patrolled the dormitories in a circuit to enforce discipline. This is ironic, as he was found guilty of incontinence and apostasy and sent to another abbey in the course of the visitation. Although the canons occupying them display a succession, the posts of responsibility varied hardly at all. In 1488, William Hales, a priest, was in charge of the infirmary, and Thomas Cooksey, who had been accused alongside Saunders in 1478 but found innocent, made his first appearance as prior of Dodford Priory, which had been absorbed by the abbey some years previously. This report and that for 1482 are very unusual in giving the title Dominus, Lord or Master, to several canons other than the abbot. However, others who are clearly priests are titled Frater, as usual. A number of the reports clearly distinguish the priests with the labels sacerdotes or presbiteri.

=== Diet ===
The commentary on the Rule of St Augustine recommends: "Subdue the flesh by fasting and abstinence from food and drink as much as your health permits." In addition, it urges "let distribution of food and clothing be made by your superior". As well as the Friday fast ordained for all believers, a 1464 bull of Pope Pius II obliged Premonstratensians to fast on Wednesdays and Saturdays, throughout Advent and for an extended Lenten period from Septuagesima to Easter. This meant that canons were to eat a meat-free diet most days of the year, so it not surprising that they stoutly defended their fishing rights. Food often became a point of contention and a focus of grumbling. The first extant report by Redman on Halesowen, dated 1478, found the canons complaining about the abbey's bread, which was said to insufficienti, non de frumento sed alliis granis confecto, ministris altaris Christi minus congruo et inhonesto: "inadequate, not made of wheat but produced from other grains, unsuitable for ministers of the altar of Christ and shameful." The canons seem to have associated the bread they were offered with that consumed by and distributed to the poor. The Rule condemned murmuring but Redman thought the complaints justified and ordered that the baking of bread be improved and reformed. Ten years later, he noted that the convent was using twenty modii (about 180 litres) of wheat and winter wheat each week to make its bread. As it was also using 60 animals a year for beef, 40 for mutton, 30 for pork, and 24 for veal, although these large quantities must include an allowance for the many guests. An inventory made after the death of Abbot Thomas Bridge in 1505 found that at "Usmore" grange, eight oxen were waiting for the cellarer and four fat beefs for the abbey kitchen. It seems unlikely that the canons of Halesowen were underfed.

=== Discipline and infractions ===
Redman's visitations found canons sometimes chafing at the order's discipline. Their infractions of the order's statutes illustrate the difficulties and demands of the religious life. In 1491, some canons were evidently dining off the premises, and Redman strictly forbade eating and drinking in a secular house within a league (three miles or an hour's walk) of the abbey. Eating together as a community was part of cenobium, community or shared life, the term Halesowen Abbey used to describe itself. The Rule states: "No one may eat or drink out of the monastery without permission, for this is not in accord with monastic discipline." However, Redman's concern was probably as much with the company the canons were keeping during their extramural activities as with maintaining the common life. During the same visitation, he ordered that Margery Cook and other women of bad reputation be put out of the abbey premises and not allowed back in. Chastity was a central requirement of the religious life, and the Commentary on the Rule is particularly concerned with the male gaze "because the unchaste eye is the sign of the unchaste soul". Breaches of chastity were not uncommon, although the penalty varied greatly. The fault for which John Saunders was condemned in 1478 was described as incontinence, or lack of control, invariably meaning a breach of chastity. In the case of Saunders and many others, though not always, this was paired with apostasy, which could mean nothing more than being absent without permission but might involve an almost total break with religious life. Redman proposed to send Saunders for three years to Cockersand Abbey, a remote place in an exposed location overlooking the Irish Sea. At the special request of the abbot and canons, he agreed to reduce this greatly: to just eighty days at Dale Abbey in Derbyshire. Moreover, he arranged for Saunders' prompt return when visiting Dale just two days later. Even when severe punishments were actually imposed, they were often revoked at signs of penitence. Thomas Bromsgrove, a priest, was listed at Halesowen alongside Saunders in 1478. He must have got into trouble subsequently, as about 1480 he was at Welbeck Abbey, where he had been sent for apostasy. However, the abbot of Welbeck wrote to Halesowen, asking that he return home soon, as he had shown himself to be submissive. The abbot of Halesowen wrote back in agreement. The leniency probably had divergent results. Saunders was present at the abbey in 1482, went on to become a trusted member of the convent, playing a central part in the election of the next abbot, and was prior by 1491. He was not mentioned in connection with the "enormities" of 1497. Bromsgrove is never heard of again, so if he did not die before the 1482 visitation, he must have left the order.

Over the course of a quarter century Redman made many criticisms or suggestions on the finer points of the liturgy and occasional criticisms, not all justified, about the management of money and resources, but disciplinary matters were often relatively minor: in June 1494 he took up the tonsure at Halesowen, threatening serious penalties if it were not reformed in line with the order's statutes. He also enjoined silence about the visitation.

=== Enormities discovered ===
At the next visitation, on 30 August 1497, Redman reported that he had "discovered enormities". He seems to have uncovered a substantial ring of canons abusing Halesowen women: the convent had considerable power over Halesowen people in general, as they were its servants and tenants. It was reported of Brother Richard Walsall that he went "above and beyond apostasy and disobedience, from the life of a child in its mother's womb being extinguished on his advice, to a very great insurrection of many of the younger men of Hales against the abbot." Redman decreed that he should be imprisoned for ten years at Croxton Abbey in Leicestershire. Richard Bacon, the sub-prior and an important aide to the abbot, was involved in the plot against the abbot and was suspected of cohabiting with local women. He was sentenced to forty days of severe penance and to be transferred to St Agatha's or Easby Abbey in North Yorkshire for three years. Richard Hampton, Roger Wednesbury, and Thomas Dudley did not deny their guilt. They were sentenced to the same punishment: Hampton and Wednesbury at the Lincolnshire abbeys of Barlings and Newsham respectively, and Dudley at West Dereham Abbey in Norfolk. These three were almost certainly among the younger men encouraged to rebel by Walsall: they are first mentioned together in the 1488 visitation, when all were still novices. The charges against Walsall mention many younger canons rebelling, which suggests rather more than three. Roger Walsall himself was considerably older: a novice in 1478. Bacon first appears, already a priest, in 1482: it could be that he is identical to Richard Wenlock, who was at the abbey in 1478 but subsequently disappears from view. If the five were prepared to procure abortions and to threaten open revolt to cover up their conduct, they were clearly ruthless men, and it seems that more were involved to a lesser extent in their conspiracy.

Despite the seriousness of the situation, a scandal was unlikely because Redman's findings were secret, as he had stressed during his previous visit. It seems unlikely that the punishments he prescribed were fully carried out. There were "tearful appeals for mercy" on behalf of the five from Abbot Thomas Bridge, from the abbot of Talley, who was reporting to Redman at Halesowen instead of undergoing a visitation at his own abbey, and from their own brother canons. Redman consented to refer the matter to the next provincial chapter. The next visitation of Halesowen was on 17 May 1500, less than three years later. All five of the accused canons — even Walsall, who had been condemned to ten years of imprisonment — were at this time resident at Halesowen Abbey and Bacon was sub-prior, as before.

== Lands and endowments ==
=== Manor of Halesowen ===
==== Jurisdictions ====
The grant of the manor of Hales brought the abbey into existence and gave it its name. It was to continue as the main economic and political focus for the abbots and the convent.

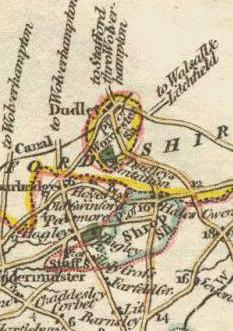
Map of Shropshire (Detached) marked as blue, in the early 19th century. In the Middle Ages, Dudley was part of Staffordshire.

In 1086 Domesday Book listed the manor of Hala as part of the hundred of Clent in Worcestershire It had 77 householders: 42 villeins 23 bordars, 8 enslaved mens, 2 enslaved women, 2 priests and 4 riders. This made it a fairly large settlement by the standards of the time, and the tenant-in-chief was Roger de Montgomery, the first Earl of Shrewsbury and a key confidant of William the Conqueror. The immense power of Roger and the importance of the manor to him led to its transfer to his county of Shropshire sometime soon after the Domesday survey. Cradley, Warley Wigorn and Lutley, manors held by other lords but part of Halesowen parish, remained within Worcestershire. The rebellion of Robert de Bellême, Roger's second son, allowed Henry I to dismantle the dynasty's vast land holdings in the Welsh Marches and Midlands. He retained Hales in royal hands, so Henry II was in a position to make a gift of it to his sister Emma of Anjou, who had married Dafydd, the son of Owain, king of Gwynedd and Prince of Wales. Emma returned the estate to the Crown in the reign of her nephew Richard I but retained the rental income. The situation was confirmed by King John in 1200. There is no direct evidence that Owen, a son of Emma and Dafydd, ever held the manor but an inquisition in the Hundred Rolls for 1273 states that when John granted the estate to the abbey he had acquired it per escoetam cuisdam nomine Oweyn — "through escheat of someone called Owen." The name of the manor often took the suffix Owen or similar by the mid-13th century. (Note: The suffix "Owen" was generally separated or hyphenated until the 20th century. Cf Holliday's article, which still used the form "Hales Owen" in 1872.)

Earl Roger's action had ensured that Halesowen Abbey, throughout its existence, was in an exclave of the historic county of Shropshire enclosed by the boundaries of Staffordshire to the north and Worcestershire on the other three sides. (Note: Halesowen remained part of Shropshire until 1844, when it was transferred to Worcestershire. In 1974, it became part of the new West Midlands county in the Metropolitan Borough of Dudley.) The royal administration seems to have been caught between ceremony and practicality in dealing with it, sometimes working through the Sheriff of Staffordshire or other notable royal servants, like Brian de Lisle. If this was confusing in relation to the manor, the residents of the wider parish of Halesowen, who looked to the abbey as their church, could be greatly inconvenienced, as it crossed the boundary of the enclave and included settlements that were undoubtedly in Worcestershire. In 1341, there were complaints that some were in danger of being taxed twice because officials for both Shropshire and Worcestershire had assessed them. Also confusingly, the abbey, manor, and parish were all within the bounds of the Diocese of Worcester. Still, the abbey itself was not subject to it, as Premonstratensian abbeys were independent of the local ordinary. The parish church and the dependent chapels, however, were subject to the bishop.

At some time in the reign of Henry III, the abbey obtained a charter to "make a borough" at Hales. Burgages were established at a rent of 12d. The burgesses were to receive any or all of the customs and privileges enjoyed by the burgesses of Hereford, subject to their own decision, and to enjoy common pasture throughout the manor of Hales and common in a defined area of woodland. There was a considerable demand for burgages, and this included tenants of the manor wishing to exchange their status for that of the free town. However, the borough seems to exercised little real independence and was not represented in the Parliament of England. In practice, the manorial and borough courts were indistinguishable, dealing with the same issues and having the same jurors.

==== Growing discontent ====
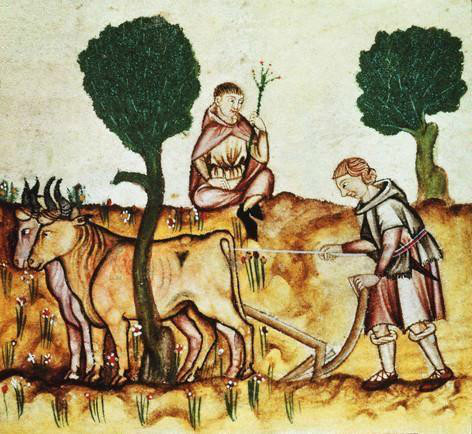
Medieval ploughing with a team of oxen.

There is considerable evidence of poor relations and conflict between the abbots of Hales and their manorial tenants. The abbots seem to have exercised a "peculiar jurisdiction" over probate. (Note: The editor of VCH reports the abbots' jurisdiction over probate with implied doubt, as reported without citation by Treadway Russell Nash, an 18th-century Worcestershire antiquarian. However, the same is reported of Dale (Stanley Park) Abbey, where the abbot's jurisdiction over probate and marriage was inherited, asserted, and exercised after the dissolution by lay lords of the manor, who took the title "lay bishop", until the mid-19th century. The jurisdiction was rooted in the Premonstratensian privilege of independence from the local bishop. See Borough, R. F. (1942). Fisher, F. N. (ed.). "The Lay-bishop of Dale" (PDF). Journal of the Derbyshire Archaeological and Natural History Society. 63. Bemrose and Sons: 91–98..) However, the foci of conflict were generally not related to the abbots' ecclesiastical authority but to their practices as landlords. In 1243, the tenants agreed to render to the abbey merchet, suit at the mill, except when it was clearly out of use, and various labour dues: six days' ploughing and six days' sowing in Lent, for each virgate of land. The abbot dispensed with 12 1/2 marks tallage which they owed, and promised that tallage would be applied at Halesowen only when it was imposed on the king's manors. He also confirmed their common pasture.

However, the tenants chafed at the authority of the manorial court and complained that its reach was, in some cases, arbitrary and could not be challenged in the king's courts. The eyre of 1255—6 heard that Abbas de Hales non permittit homines de Hales placitare vetitum namium in com[itatu]. Immo capet namium eorum et non vult eos deliberare per ballivos domini Regis — "The Abbot of Hales does not allow the men of Hales to make a plea of vetitum namium (prohibited distraint) (Note: Vetitum namium, meaning prohibited or unjust distraint, was a technical legal term for an action to recover a distrained animal or other property that the lord had taken as security for the behaviour of the tenant. Generally, the first resort when such an item was not returned when due was to ask the sheriff for replevin, or legal restitution. If this failed, the appeal to a higher authority was called placitum vetitum namium, "plea of prohibited distraint". cf. Vetitum namium: where the bailiff of a lord seizes the goods or beasts of another and the lord forbids the bailiff to deliver to a sheriff who attempts to make replevin, the owner of the cattle may demand satisfaction in placitum de vetito namio.) The Halesowen tenants were concerned that prohibition of such an action logically gave the abbot total control over their property, as there was no external check on unjust appropriation of it. On the contrary he grabs the distrained items and doesn't want a decision via the officials of the Lord King." The privileges of the "ancient demesne", granted by King John's charter, allowed tenants to go to law against the abbot in his own court. They used the law to frustrate the abbot at every turn, and the dependence of proceedings on compurgation or purging of guilt by oath tended to forge a solidarity among them. When an accused called on support in this way, it was said that he vadit legem - "waged law" or "went to law". If this was held to prove their innocence, they had fect legem — made their law.

The abbots' interpretation of their powers as lords of the manor invaded every corner of their tenants' lives. At a court held on 20 June 1274, for example, two men, John of Romsley and Nicholas Sewal, were given until the next court to decide whether or not they would marry the widows assigned to them by the abbey's cellarer, who managed the proceedings of the manorial court. Immediately afterwards, Roger Ketel of Illey was fined 4 shillings, a large sum, for retaining the abbot's heriot, a feudal relief or death duty. This was the conclusion to a fairly protracted dispute: at the court of 9 May, he had been placed in day-to-day distraint, detention with no fixed limit in the abbey prison, because he refused to part with the payment due on his mother-in-law's death. The same measure had been applied to his guarantors and a man called Richard of Illey, whose part in the affair is unclear. Heriots were a significant source of income for the abbey: at least three were levied between Ketel's appearances, for the deaths of a husband, a sister-in-law, and a daughter. Ketel and his family went on to defy the court on several occasions, and he emerged as a leading figure in the tenants' resistance. The court, on 3 June 1275, heard that he had failed to answer a summons issued in the previous session. He argued that he was essoined (had made a valid excuse) for that session, not only for routine attendance but for a special purpose for which the court had summoned him. He "made his law" by compurgation and escaped punishment. He was fined 5 shillings by the court of 11 March 1277 for giving false evidence in a case involving Thomas Ulf, a man from his own village; the jury were fined, collectively, twelve shillings for believing him, presumably because they were all suspected of collusion. On 14 March 1278, his son, also Roger, was accused of raising the hue and cry to prevent the abbot's bailiffs from taking away a distrained item, perhaps an animal. The issue, though minor, dragged on for some time, with a challenge to the evidence given against the son, and Roger senior repeating the offence.

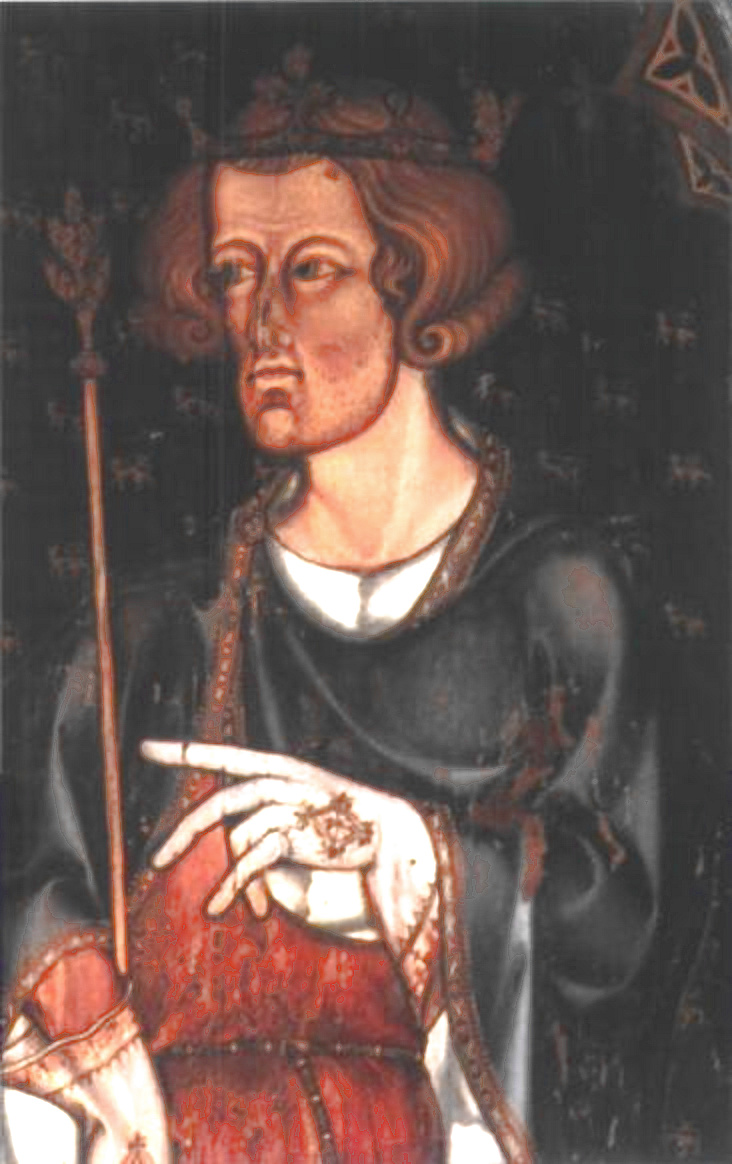
Portrait, thought to be of Edward I, in Westminster Abbey

==== Legitimacy challenged ====
In 1278, the tenants challenged the very basis of the abbot's lordship over them. The abbot and convent petitioned the king in parliament to obtain help in their dispute with the men of the manor of Halesowen, who, on the plea that from of old they had belonged to the royal demesne, were refusing to render their feudal customs and services. Towards the end of the year, the abbot and some canons were assaulted at Beoley. It is unclear how this was related to their dispute with their tenants but Godfrey Giffard, the bishop of Worcester, considered it serious enough to instruct the deans of Warwick, Pershore, and Wick to excommunicate those responsible. It seems that a substantial number of tenants boycotted the abbot's court: Ketel's name is on a list of 21 essoins (excuses for absence) for the 20 November 1279 session that had to be stitched to the side of the record.

Instead of rushing to the aid of the convent, Edward I had scented an opportunity to recover royal estates and had a writ of quo warranto issued, compelling the abbot to state under what authority he held the manor. The abbot was able to refer to King John's charter and Henry III's confirmation of 1127, settling the case. Ketel then faced a reckoning in the manorial court, where he was fined 100 shillings for his part in denying the abbot's authority in the king's court. He was allowed to pay in biannual installments of ten shillings, on the Nativity of Saint John the Baptist (24 June) and Christmas Day. The abbot portrayed himself as magnanimous in allowing Roger to keep his land, albeit at the lord's discretion, as a copyholder. Pledges from his neighbours at Illey show that he had support, and he may have been bringing a test case.

==== Conflict continued ====
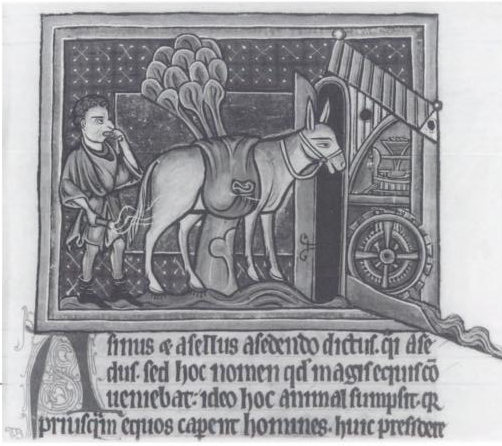
Medieval watermill with undershot wheel. Oxford, Bodleian Library, MS. Bodl. 764

Most of the manor court's extant records date from the period after this vindication of the abbot's rights and resistance, which continued, sometimes apparently organised, sometimes teasing and playful. The mill and the requirement to both use and pay for it were innovations that the tenants resented: before the manor was granted to the abbey, they had ground their own corn. Numerous tenants were presented at the manorial court for either persisting in grinding their own corn or using mills outside the manor. On one occasion in 1280, nine were presented simultaneously, suggesting an organised strike or boycott. Naturally, the nine included Roger Ketel and his friend William Ulf, who maintained that they were in the right and "made their law". However, this seems to have been Ketel's last act of defiance. He died within a month of being confined in the stocks for a day and night by two of the abbey's officials, Robert Beley and William Sherburn. This must have happened between 1 July 1282, when he last attended court, in place of Nicholas Richardson, and 25 September 1282, when the abbot was negotiating with his widow, Matilda. His fine was halved to fifty shillings: up to that point, nothing had been paid. Matilda made an installment of 9s. 4d., perhaps pointedly short of the ten shillings demanded, leaving 49s 8d. to pay.

Related to the mills were the streams and pools, which the tenants persisted in treating as their own, poaching in the pools and "stanking" or damming the waterways to feed their families on fish, particularly trout. They argued their case stoutly when presented to the manorial court. In 1280, for example, four men were accused by Roger Hall, the abbot's overseer, of obstructing the stream's flow to facilitate their fishing; they managed to turn the tables in court, and Roger himself was fined. When in 1293 Nicholas Fitz William, a child, was accused of fishing in the forbidden sluices of the abbot's new mill, his flight from the scene was used as evidence of his guilt. However, he explained that he had fled because John, the abbot's bailiff, had already struck him twice with his bow, breaking the weapon in the process, and he was afraid of a further drubbing. He was able to call on Roger Hall to give evidence and escaped punishment.

The records for 1293 also show children at Romsley (Note: Although Romsley was strictly a separate manor from Halesowen, it descended with it from the 12th century. The abbots refused to acknowledge that it was distinct and treated it as a member of Halesowen. cf. Willis-Bund, John William, ed. (1913). Halesowen: Introduction, borough and manors. Vol. 3. pp. 136–146, text anchors 192–6.) cocking a snook at the abbot, even when he was displaying his most dread powers: infangthief and gallows, which together allowed him to hang felons from his own manor.

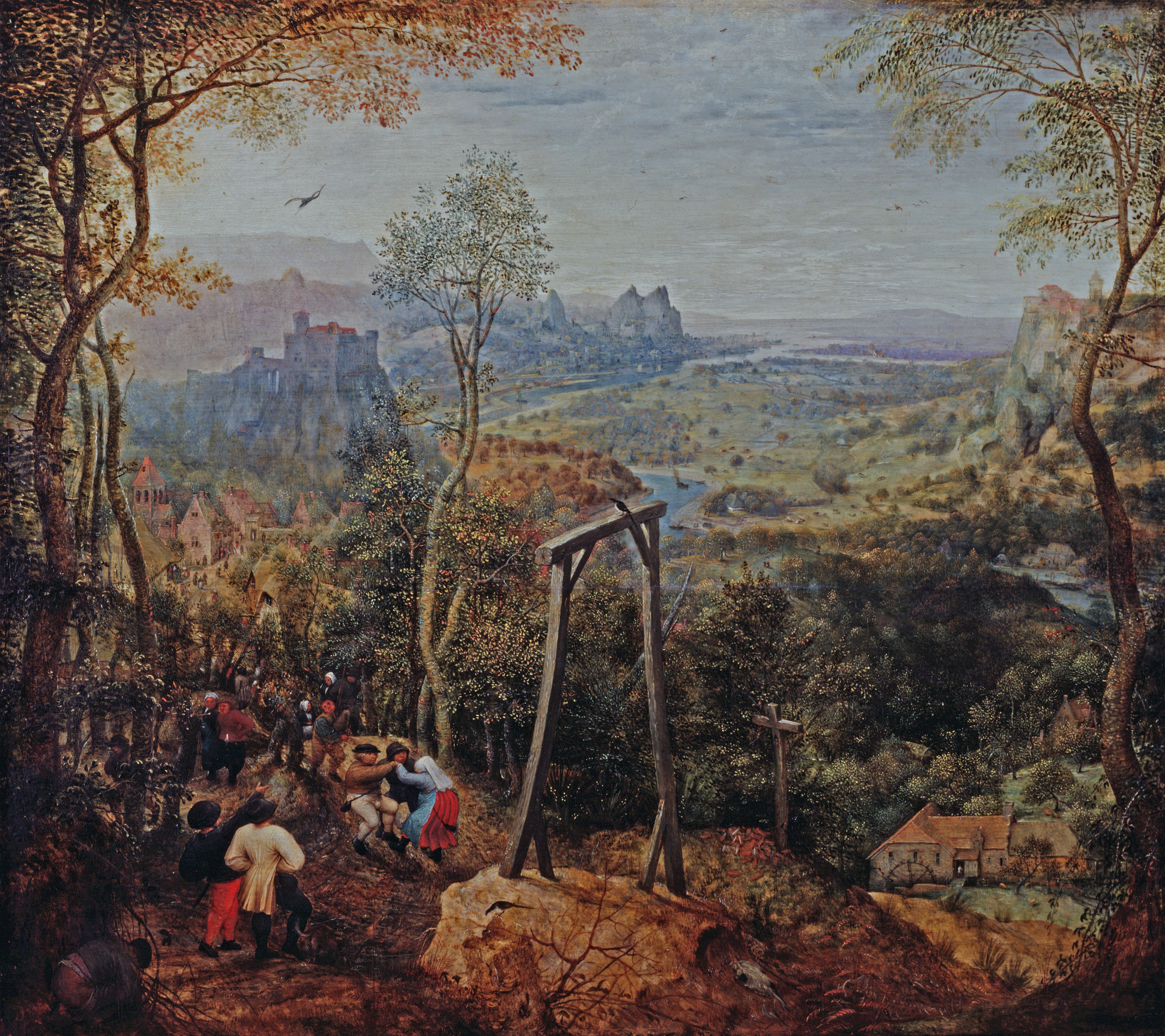
Magpie on the Gallows, by Pieter Bruegel the Elder

Villa de Romesley presentant quod cum ballivi domini Abbatis levasscent furcas apud Honeford ibidem venerunt Amicia in la Grene et Juliana filia Rogeri de Honeford et unus eorum dicit quod Cristina filia Rogeri predicti prostraverunt predictas furcas injuste.

Et venientes ballivi domini Abbatis et levaverunt huthesium juste.

Et quod variabant in sua presentatione tota villata est in misericordia et predicte mulieres atachiantur si inveniantur.

Translation:

The vill of Romsley presents that when the baliffs of the Lord Abbot erected gallows at Honeford, Amicia Green, Juliana, the daughter of Roger Honeford, and according to one of them Christina, daughter of the same Roger, came there and wrongfully threw down the gallows.

And the bailiffs of the Lord Abbot came and rightly raised the hue and cry.

And as they varied in their statements the whole village is at mercy and the females mentioned are to be attached if they can be found.

A fine of 2d. for the villagers is recorded with the account of the offence.

Tensions were perhaps eased when, in 1327, the abbot agreed to commute labour services for a fixed rent. However, landlords' nerves were raw in the years after the Peasants' Revolt, even in areas well outside the main zone of activity in the south east of England. On 12 February 1387, a commission of oyer and terminer was issued on the news that "diverse bondmen and bond-tenants of the abbot at Romsley had refused their customs and services for their holdings and confederated by oath to resist the abbot and his ministers." The matter seems to have been treated very seriously, with a considered selection of landed gentry to investigate, reflecting the manor's ambiguous position: Robert Burgulon, a Staffordshire justice of the peace, Thomas Lee, a Shropshire lawyer with previous experience of commissions to suppress rebellion, and John Russell, another lawyer and relative of the powerful Worcestershire landowner Sir John Russell of Strensham. It seems, however, that this was the end of major hostilities: there is no evidence that conflict continued into the next century, probably because the improved position of labourers brought about by the Black Death was now producing concrete improvements.

=== Small gains ===
Throughout the 13th century, Halesowen Abbey made useful adjustments and small gains, some in outlying areas and some politically significant, to its landholdings.

The abbey had a constructive relationship with the holders of neighbouring Frankley manor throughout the century. As early as John's reign, before the abbey's formal foundation date, Simon, lord of Frankley, agreed with the convent about the boundaries of their lands along the River Stour, allowing the abbey to construct a mill pond on the river which extended into its own estates. The position of the respective manors seems to indicate that the agreement relates to lands held by the lords of Frankley within Halesowen manor: it seems that the abbey held lands in Frankley too. The de Frankley family seem to have had other estates in the region, including Trysull in Staffordshire. Later, in Henry III's reign, Simon granted the abbey a rent of four shillings for the souls of Rose, his wife, and Elicia, his mother. Simon's son Philip donated the labour services and other dues, including 12s. rent, of William de Stampes, one of his tenants. The abbey granted to Philip land in Frankley, which had previously been held by the chaplain Ralph: Philip sublet this land, by 1257, to John Walerand, a cleric, giving the abbey permission to enter the property and distrain if the rent of 40d. went unpaid. On 6 November 1276 Emma, Lady of Frankley, Philip's niece or granddaughter, confirmed a rent of 2s. from the land held by Hugh de la Rudinge in Frankley for the soul of her late husband, Anger de Talton. Emma died late in 1298, described by the inquisition post mortem in Worcestershire as the widow of Nicholas de Wheathampstead, a man who had witnessed the charter of Halesowen borough. Her Worcestershire lands were worth only £8 3s. 9d.

At Halesowen, in the reign of Henry III, Roger, son of Roger the Cleric, gave several plots of land and permission to build a mill pond and mill, on condition that he was allowed to fish in the overflow water and have his corn ground free of charge. During the reign of Edward I, John Lyttelton, with the assent of his wife Lucy, granted the abbot and convent all the waste (uncultivated land) they were able to appropriate. John was the uncle of Thomas Lyttelton, who later became lord of Frankley, but it is unclear from his deed precisely which land he was offering to the abbey.

=== The Lenches ===
The Lenches

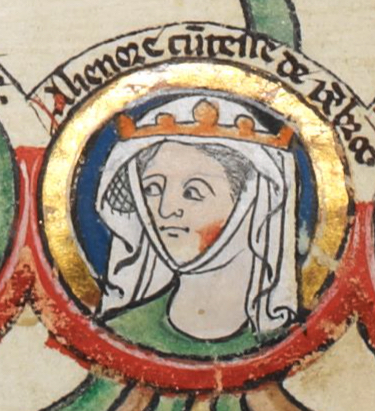
Eleanor, Countess of Leicester. Early 14th-century depiction.

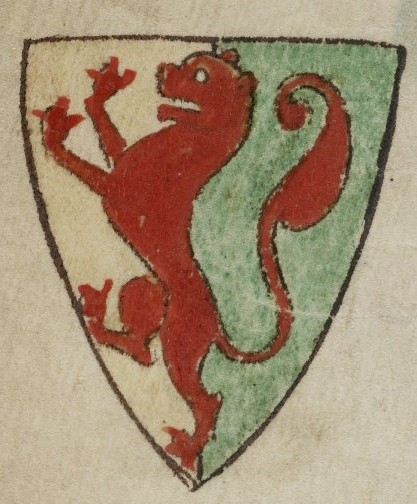
Arms of William Marshal, 2nd Earl of Pembroke

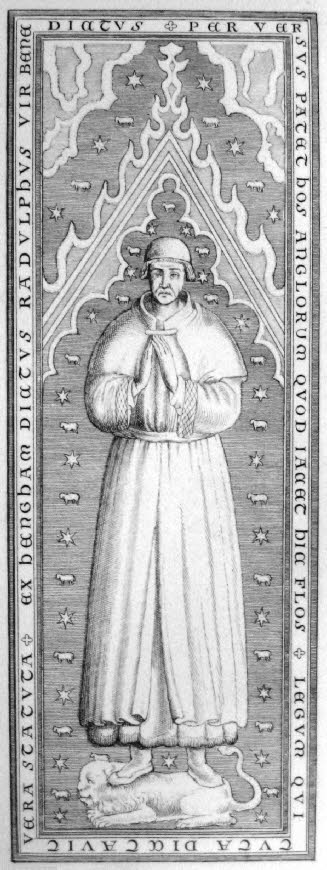
Ralph de Hengham

On 12 November 1227 Warin Fitz William and his wife Hawise conveyed to Halesowen Abbey 40 acres of land at Ab Lench. William Marshal, 2nd Earl of Pembroke quitclaimed to Halesowen Abbey the forty acres as well as common of pasture at Ab Lench for the souls of himself and his wife Eleanor, the king's sister. The abbey was to pay the annual rent of 4s at Inkberrow Castle. Subsequently, William granted the rent back to the abbot and canons. Eleanor, the king's sister, was a child of about twelve at the time of the grant: she was to be a living link between the leadership of the baronial opposition to successive kings, as she later married Simon de Montfort, 6th Earl of Leicester. Almost immediately, the abbey became locked in a conflict with local landowners. The abbot and convent were accused of encroaching on the common pasture by erecting buildings and possibly sowing crops. Roger of Lench, possibly the lord of the manor, and Stephen of Lench, initiated an assize of novel disseisin to prevent them, perhaps on behalf of the commoners. However, the abbot protected himself against complete loss by securing from the king on 18 September 1230 a mandate to the sheriff of Worcestershire to prevent his adversaries' demolishing his barns, which were full of seed corn. He was allowed until 2 February to complete the removal of the offending buildings.

The small grant to an abbey on a far edge of the county may have had a political motivation. Still, it was followed by other small donations in the Lenches, close to the Worcestershire/Warwickshire border. Around 1230 Roger Rokulf, lord of Church Lench, made several grants to Halesowen Abbey: a virgate of land with its messuage; seven perches of meadow on the way to Aceton (possibly Atch Lench to the south east); a man called Luke, with his chattels, messuage, garden and three selions of land at Church Lench. In 1272–3 the abbot of Halesowen conveyed for life a messuage and 3 carucates of land in Church Lench and a carucate of land in Ab Lench to Ralph de Hengham, who later became chief justice of the Common Pleas.

=== Harborne and Smethwick ===
The manor of Harborne was granted to Halesowen Abbey by Margaret de Redvers (later de Breauté), daughter of Warin II fitzGerold. She also granted the advowson of the church, a gift that led to much greater conflict than that of the manor (see below). The manor of Smethwick went with Harborne and was included in Margaret's grant: both were held under the overlordship of the bishop of Coventry and Lichfield. The date of the grant is not certain but it was probably by 1227, when Osbert de Parmentur, a villein, testified in a land dispute that the ten acres of land he held at Harborne were part of the free tenement of abbot of Halesowen. In May 1229 Abbot Richard of Hales sued Margaret to acquit him of the services he owed to the bishop for Harborne and Smethwick. She did not appear to answer the summons and the case was postponed. In January 1230, her attorney appeared in court to deny that she was the mesne lord, or intermediate holder of the land between the bishop and abbey: a claim which the abbot did not dispute. This was a fictitious claim to establish that the abbot was the lord of the two manors, holding them directly from the bishop: in 1284 the abbot of Halesowen was listed as holding one quarter of a knight's fee in Harborne and Smethwick of the bishop, for which he paid one mark, with no mention of a mesne lord.

A collection of charters from the reign of Edward I suggests a lively market in development land around Harborne and Smethwick. Abbots Martin and Nicholas made several grants of land to John, son of Adam de Theshale. Most were in the wasteland between the manors and the rents were generally low. One plot next to the road from Weoley to Birmingham cost only half a penny per year. However, one plot cost 40s. and the rent was an additional 12d. annually. However, John seems to have made a success of developing his plots and on 14 April 1305 sold all his holdings in Harborne to Richard of Edgbaston and Emma, his wife, for £55.

=== Rowley ===
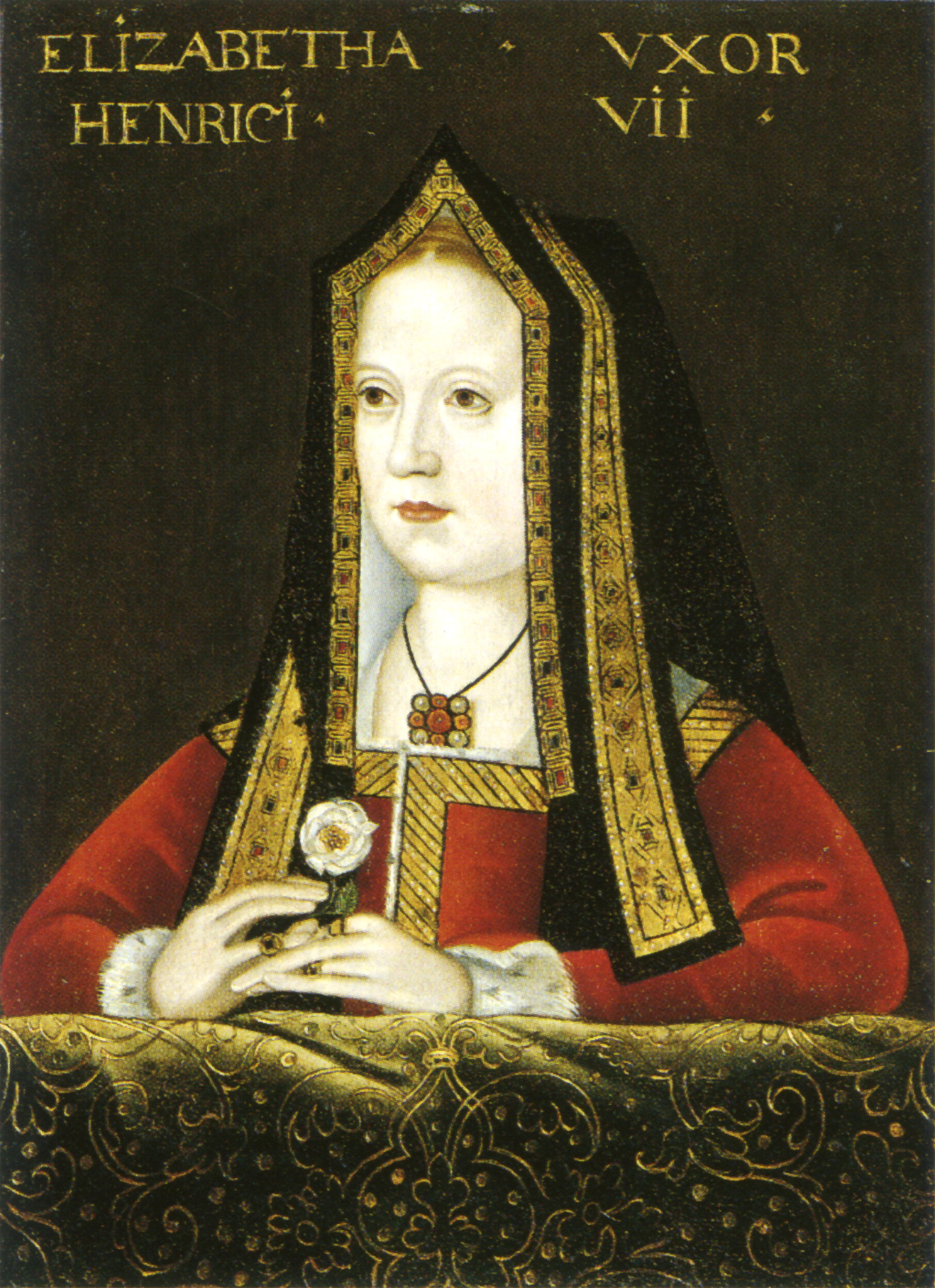
Elizabeth of York, 16th century copy of a contemporary portrait.

On Easter Tuesday, 1331, John de Hampton granted the manor of Rowley to Halesowen Abbey. For this, a canon would offer the full service for the dead daily for his soul and that of his wife Eleanor, his brother Richard, and for all their family, past, present, and future. A charter of the same year, known from an inspeximus and confirmation of 28 May 1391, asserted that Edward III granted the manor of Rowley to the abbot and convent at an annual rent of £10 6s. 8d. The point of the king's charter was not simply to confirm the grant of the estate but to assert and clarify his residual interest in it. The estate was to be held under a fee farm grant, not the usual frankalmoin, which meant that the abbey would always have to find the annual rent for it. Equally, on 20 September 1332, the king licensed the abbey to sublet the estate to tenants. The rent paid by the abbot was available for the king to grant to whomever he pleased; in 1337 he gave it to Alice Plomton, a lady in waiting to his own sister, Eleanor, Countess of Guelders, as an allowance, pending a fuller provision which he promised he would arrange later. On 4 December, the king issued a writ de intendendo, a formal notification to the abbot of Halesowen that he owed homage to Alice for the manor of Rowley. In 1486 the rent was one of a large number granted by Henry VIII to his wife, Elizabeth of York.

=== Warley ===
The manor of Warley was granted to Halesowen Abbey in 1337/8 by Joan Botetourt. The Calendar of the Patent Rolls has two entries for the initial gift, one a brief notice, dated 2 May 1337, of a licence that describes it as a gift in frankalmoin and intended to finance three canons who will celebrate mass daily in the abbey church for the royal family and Joan's own family. The second, dated similarly, refers to the estate being alienated in mortmain and gives a little more detail about the conditions of the grant, stipulating six wax candles for Joan's anniversary and alms of 20 shillings to be distributed among people experiencing poverty. The complexities of subinfeudation meant that, to make the grant secure, Joan had to win the assent of other parties.

The feudal barons of Dudley had long held the overlordship of Warley. When John de Somery, the last of his line to hold Dudley Castle, died without issue in 1322, his possessions passed to his sisters and co-heirs, Margaret, who had married John de Sutton, and Joan, the widow of Thomas Botetourte. Margaret and John de Sutton took Dudley Castle. It seems that the overlordship of Warley was divided between the two sisters. The terre tenants or lords of the manor at Warley were the Fokerhams. The charter of 1309 by which Richard Fokerham had acquired the entire manor from his father, William, is extant. A few days before Joan granted Warley to Halesowen Abbey, Richard Fokerham made a grant to Joan, described as Lady of Weoley. In it, Richard refers to the manor of Warley as divided into moieties, one of which he inherited from John de Sutton, Lord of Dudley, and leases to Joan, the other of which he grants. In early August 1337, Richard quitclaimed the manor of Warley to the abbot and convent of Halesowen. After the Feast of the Assumption, in mid-August, John de Sutton also quit-claimed Warley to the abbot and convent. For this, he was to receive the full benefit of their prayers, fasts, vigils, alms, psalms, and masses, and at death was to receive the same benefits as an abbot. The abbot and convent then granted the manor back to Richard Fokerham for life, to hold in full by service of a rose on John the Baptist's Day.

On 23 August, Joan obtained an inspeximus and confirmation, both written into the public record, setting out the terms of her donation to the abbey, as contained in an indenture or chirograph. The abbey agreed that Joan and her successors should sponsor three canons, all at least 20 years of age, who would seek ordination as priests and then take up the chantry responsibilities envisaged by Joan. Each day they were to say mass as well as placebo and dirige, vespers and matins for the dead, for Edward III, and for Joan and her family: she named in particular Thomas Botetourte, her sister Margaret and her nephew John. Substitutes were to be provided while the named canons were unordained or unavailable. Her annual obiit was to be celebrated with all the solemnity previously reserved for the founder of the abbey, Peter des Roches. 20 shillings were to be distributed to people experiencing poverty in portions of one halfpenny, with an envisaged attendance of 480. The canons of the abbey, on the other hand, were to receive a mark (13s. 4d.) each for attending. Six large wax candles, valued at a mark, were to be burned: two each at the altar, at her own tomb, and at Margaret's. Joan was also to be mentioned at other commemorations of the dead. In accordance with the king's licence and their indenture, Joan issued a charter to the abbot and convent, granting them the manor of Warley and all that pertained to it, on the Sunday following the Feast of the Circumcision of Christ 1338. She must have died within weeks, as on 4 March the king had her heir, John Botetourt, in wardship and was presenting a parson to the church at Forton, Staffordshire on his behalf. At some point after he came into his estates, her son varied the terms of Joan's grant to allow the abbot and convent to appoint one of the canons to the family chantry.

The true donor in the grant of Warley appears to have been Richard Fokerham, who was expected to forgo his estate so that Joan could donate it, with nothing apparently in return. However, the token service of a rose was commonly used to disguise underlying financial transactions, especially when lands were encumbered. Medieval property transactions seldom refer to cash considerations. Still, it is possible that Richard retained Warley for his own lifetime only after the abbey and Joan offered a way to relieve him of heavy debts. (Note: In the Angevin period monasteries frequently expanded their holdings by working with Jewish lenders to acquire encumbered estates: see Richardson, H. R. (1960). The English Jewry Under Angevin Kings. London: Methuen. pp. 83–108.) This was common enough in the Midlands. (See the example of Cistercian Buildwas Abbey apparently working through the Jewish community of Hereford to acquire land: Close Rolls, 1231– 4, pp. 430-1. However, Jews never had a monopoly on rural credit, and after the Edict of Expulsion of 1290, they had no share at all. In addition to using Jewish lenders, Premonstratensian Dale Abbey employed a cleric, William of Southwell, to find encumbered estates for them, sometimes using feoffment for a single rose to conceal money transactions.

=== Granges and leases ===
Like most religious houses, Halesowen Abbey initially managed its demesne through a network of granges. Although they might provide accommodation and administrative functions, granges were primarily storage facilities. The word "grange" ultimately derives from Latin granum and, like "granary", essentially signifies a grain store. An early abbot's difficulties at Ab Lench resulted from his unlawful attempt to establish a grange on common pasture. The court report of an incident at Romsley in 1271 makes clear that its granges were used to store grain for tenants, as well as for the canons' own consumption and for sale. Coming home on the night of 14 September de cervisia ("from the beer"), Nicholas was shut out of the house by his mother-in-law, Hawise. He broke in and assaulted Hawise, setting off a brawl in which a neighbour struck Nicholas with a cup and many others became involved. The incident was serious enough to warrant an inventory of the main culprits' assets. This disclosed that Nicholas had a store of oats, of unknown quantity, in Farley Grange This was just one of the abbey's granges. It was listed with Offmoor, Hamstead, and Radewall Granges, Home Grange, and New Grange in the Taxatio Ecclesiastica of 1291. Farley Grange also appears in a lease of 1415, along with Blakeley in Oldbury, Owley in Lapal, Radewall in Ridgacre, and Offmoor. Helle Grange is mentioned in the grant of the abbey lands to John Dudley.

The 14th century brought economic challenges stemming from the demographic crisis, beginning with the Great Famine of 1315–1317. They were greatly intensified in the middle of the century by the Black Death and ensuing outbreaks of plague. Despite the widespread suffering, labour rose in value relative to assets, especially land. Halesowen Abbey, like other major landowners, responded by leasing out more and more of its demesne to those able to cultivate it, and, in some cases, even selling land, initially in small transactions involving peasants. The Lyttelton charters give glimpses of this process, starting on 25 March (Lady Day) 1335, with the lifetime lease of a tenement at Ridgeacre and two other plots to John Weston of Coventry and his wife for eight shillings per year. At Michaelmas 1369, Abbot Richard de Hampton and the convent leased a plot in the manor of Halesowen to John atte Holt de Hulton for sixty years for a rent of eighteen pence. In January 1378, the abbot and convent of Halesowen granted the reversion of a house and lands to John Broun, Cristina, his wife, and their heirs: this was the sale of a small estate, although the price is not stated in the grant. In May 1382, Thomas Wheatcroft of Harborne was granted a lease of various lands in Ridgeacre for six shillings and eightpence. With the new century, the length of leases, where specified, increases considerably, although the transactions remain small at first. In April 1404, William Cockes of Halesowen was granted an eighty-year lease on a house called Chyltonusplace for four shillings, but a provision was made that he or his heirs could sublet the place for an increase in rent to five shillings. Three years later, William Caldewelle acquired three areas of land in Warley and elsewhere on a 99-year lease at a rent of six shillings. Slowly, the pattern of tenure was being changed from one of villeins and cottagers to small farmers, with a corresponding change in the landscape.

With a lease of 1415, the dealing in leases seems to attain an entirely new scale. A group of clerics and laymen, headed by John Porter, vicar of Kidderminster, took on five entire granges for a term of sixty years, but on puzzling terms: the indenture provided for Halesowen Abbey to pay to the vicar and churchwardens of Kidderminster £400 over 20 years following the death of a named individual, Richard Russeby. The whole story is not apparent in the lease conditions, not least because Blakeley Grange, one of those apparently handed over to the consortium, was on the market again long before the term elapsed: a six-year lease to John de Walloxhale of Halesowen is extant, dating from February 1443. The date 1415 may be a clue to the purpose of the transaction: the king was about to launch the invasion of France that led to the Battle of Agincourt and religious houses had every reason to minimise their tax liability and their exposure to the levying of "voluntary" loans. (Note: The financial pressures are covered by Barker, Juliet (2005). Agincourt. London: Abacus. pp. 104–13. ISBN 978034911918-2., Tables of lay and clerical taxation are given in Jacob, E. F. (1961). The Fifteenth Century. Oxford University Press. pp. 203–4. ISBN 978-0198217145.)

However, leases of major assets, and even of crops, to wealthy individuals did become normal during the abbey's final century. In May 1505, Abbot Thomas and his house granted a lease to Sir William Lyttelton's steward, Richard Hawkys, of "the tythe barne of Illey, and all the tythe corne of almaner greynes, and the tythe hey of Melley felde and Melley medowe yn Illey, with all tythe corne and hey belonging to the Township and Elde of Illey." This lease is strictly related to the glebe of the parish church, rather than the abbey's own demesne. The Lady Day dealings of 1522 included a 60-year lease to William Green and his wife Joan of Radewall Grange and a pasture. Demesne land was not entirely leased out, as it was by some abbeys: Valor Ecclesiasticus in 1535 reported £30 from the Halesowen demesne land and £7 from Dodford Priory. However, most of the revenue sources are specified as either redditus (something rendered, rent) or firma (farm, a rented property or right), both indicating a yield from a leasing arrangement.

== Controlled churches ==
Halesowen Abbey: advowsons of churches

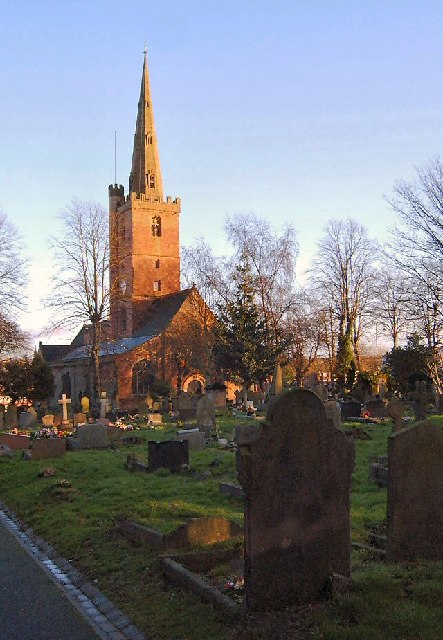
Church of St John the Baptist, Halesowen. Substantially a medieval building, with modern additions to the south aisle.
52°27′01″N 2°03′04″W

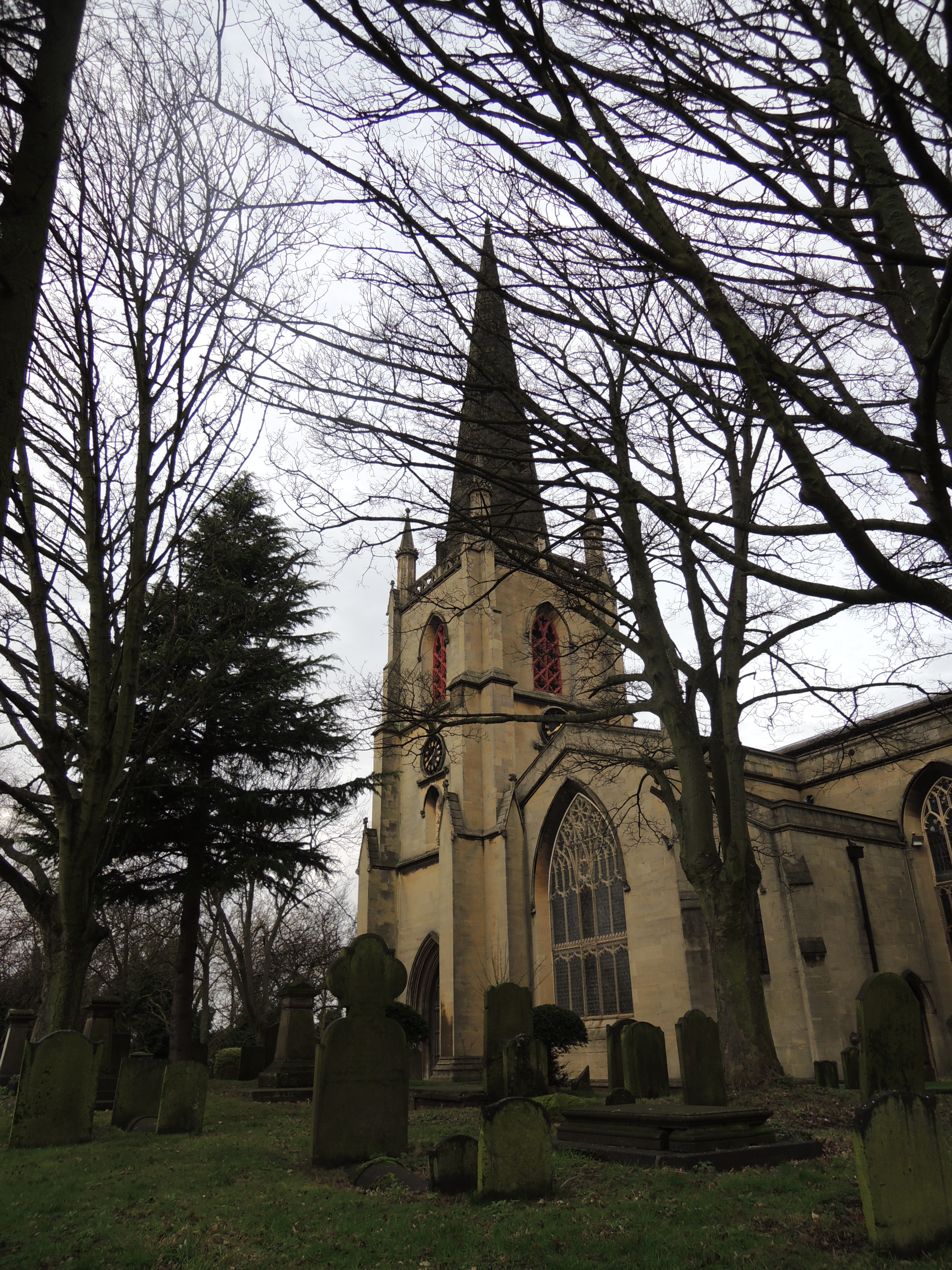
Church of St Matthew, Walsall, formerly All Saints'. The 15th-century church was heavily reconstructed/restored in 1819—21 and 1879—80.
52°34′57″N 1°58′38″W

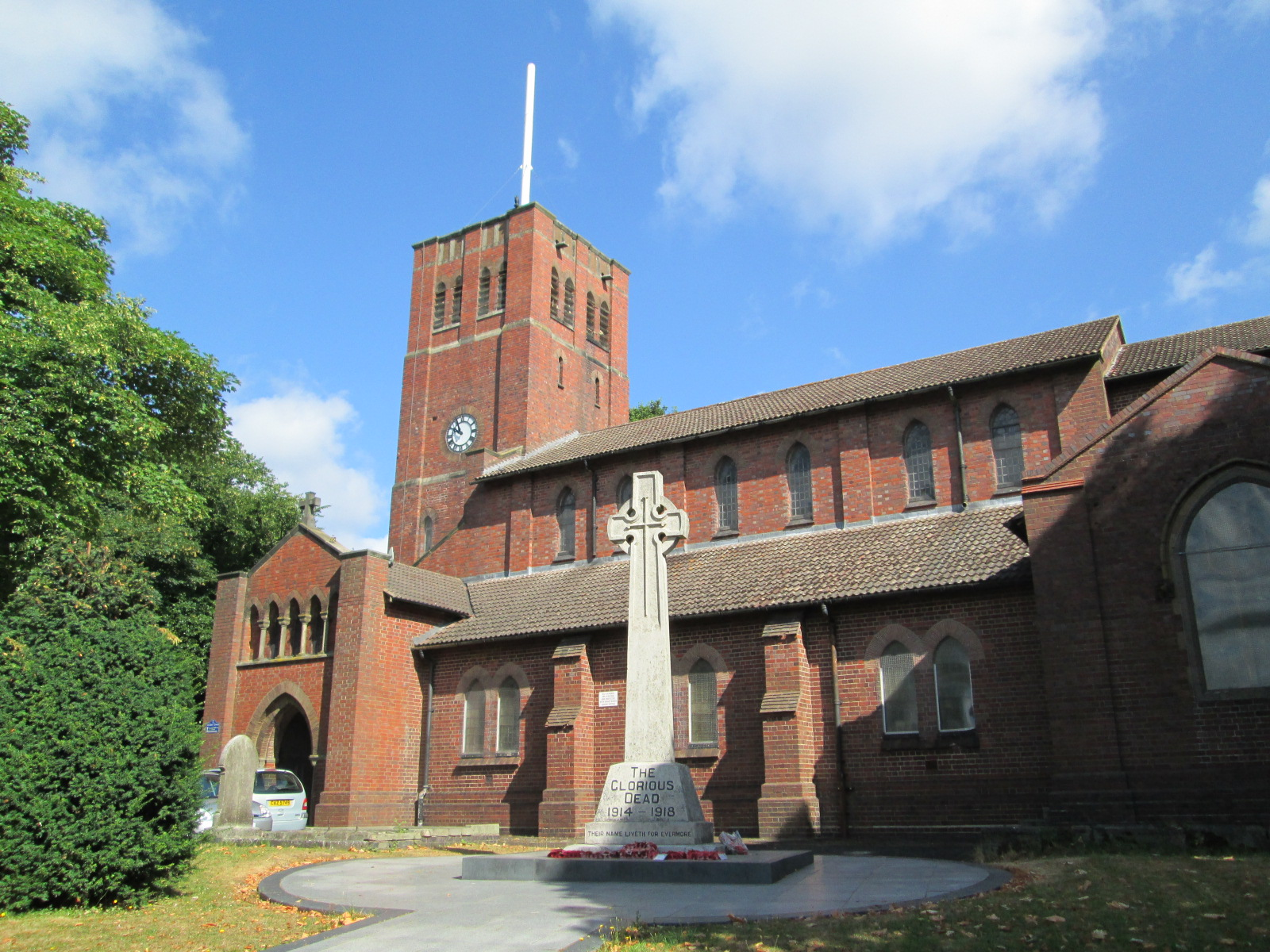
Church of St Giles, Rowley Regis. 1923 building on the original site.
52°29′05″N 2°02′43″W

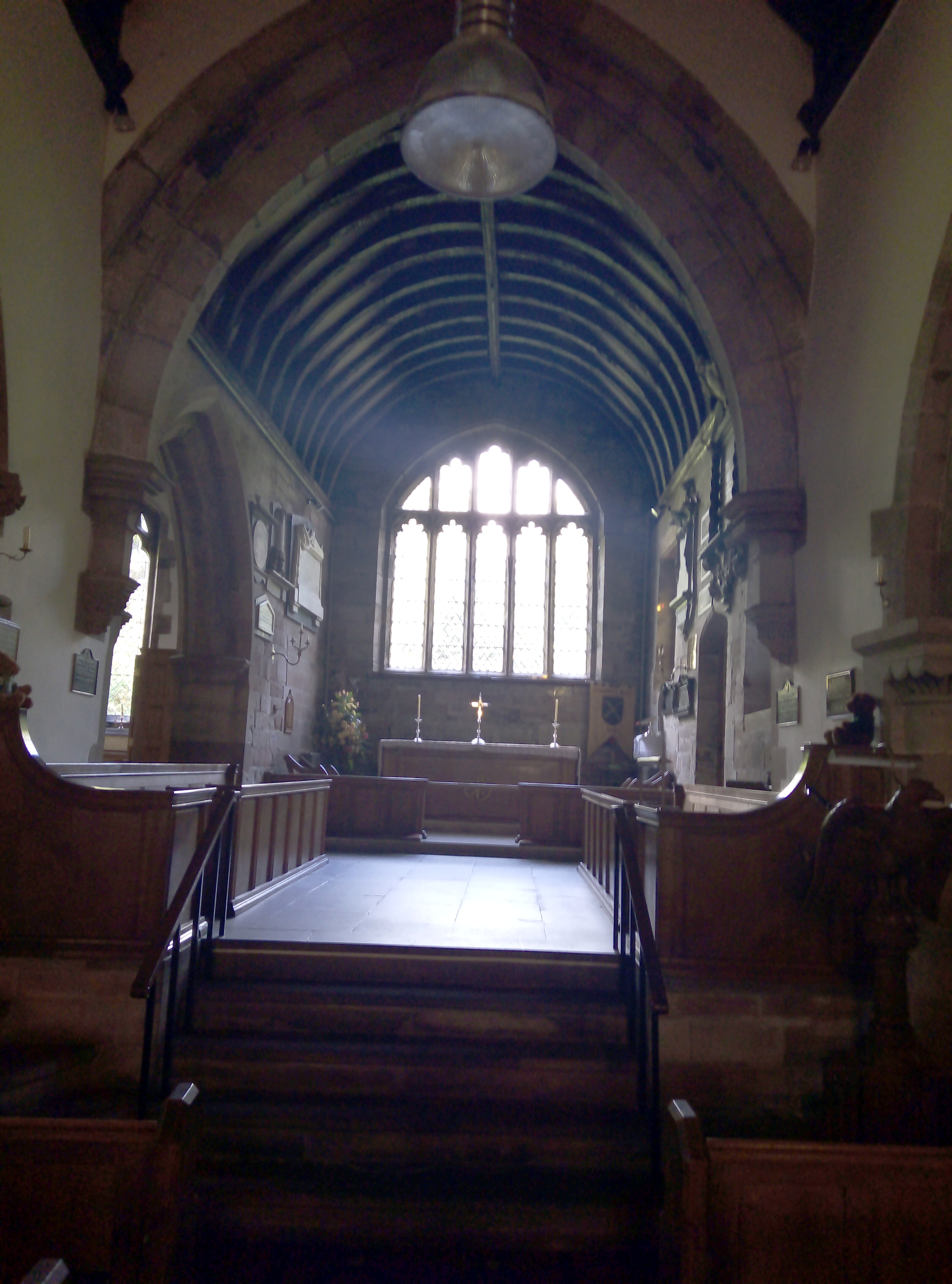
Church of St Leonard, Clent. Partly medieval, with a 15th-century tower. Nave rebuilt 1884—5.
52°24′44″N 2°06′23″W

Controlled churches: images and locations
Halesowen Abbey: advowsons of churches

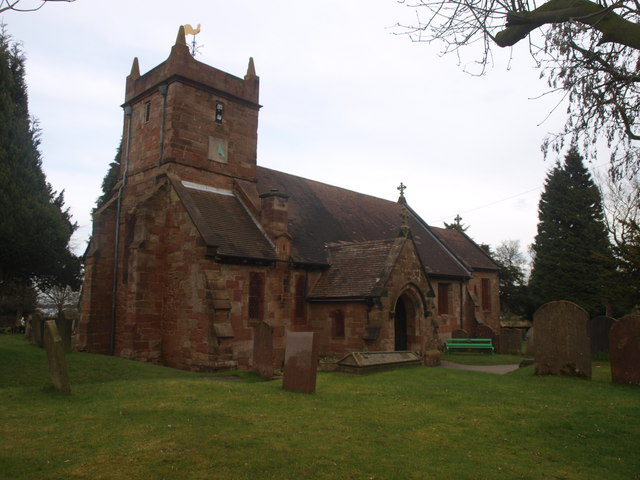
Church of St Leonard, Frankley. Substantially a medieval building, with modern additions to the south aisle.
52°25′18″N 2°00′11″W

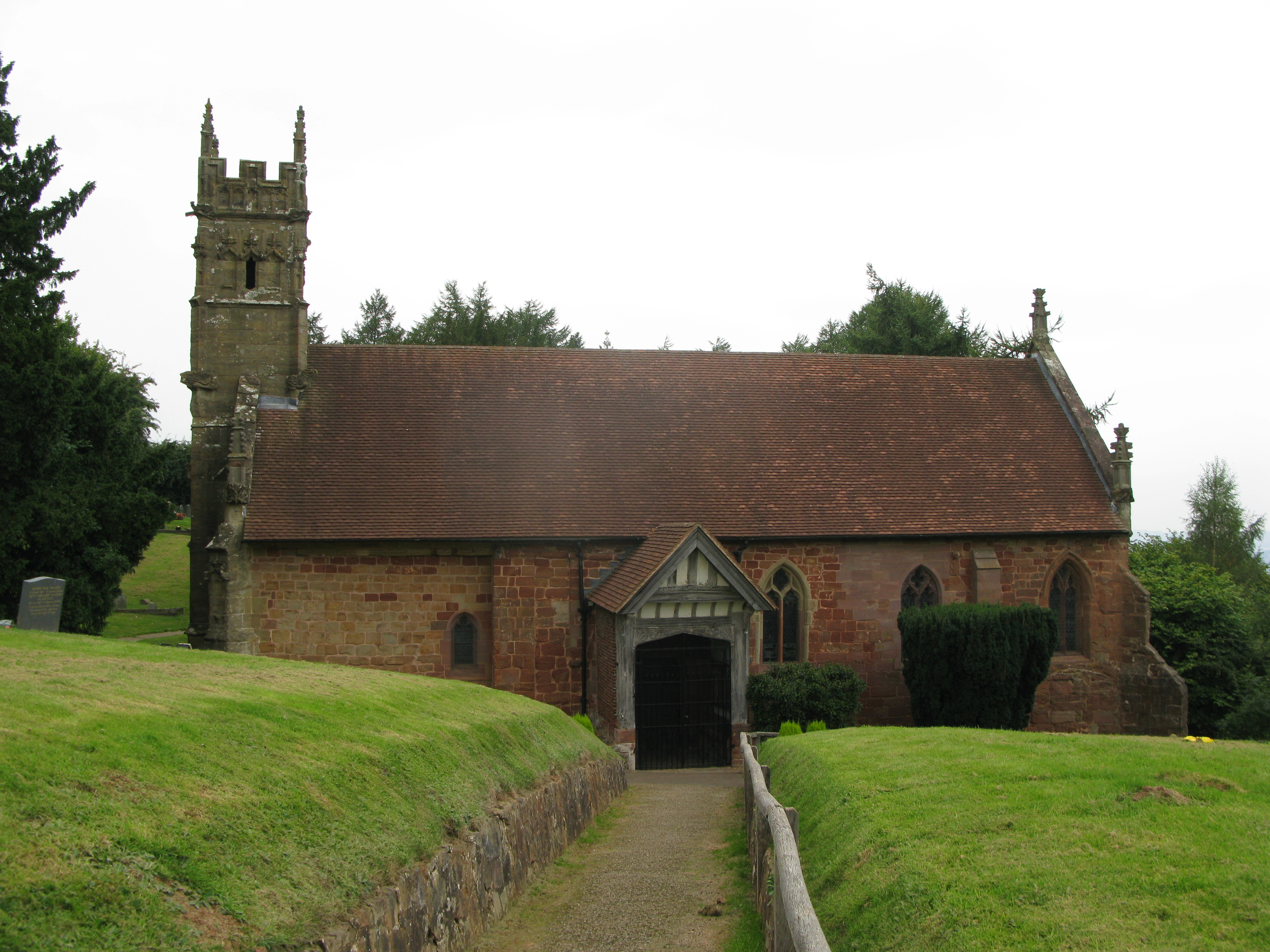
Church of St Kenelm, Romsley. 12th and 14—15th century church, partial Victorian restoration..
52°25′30″N 2°05′00″W

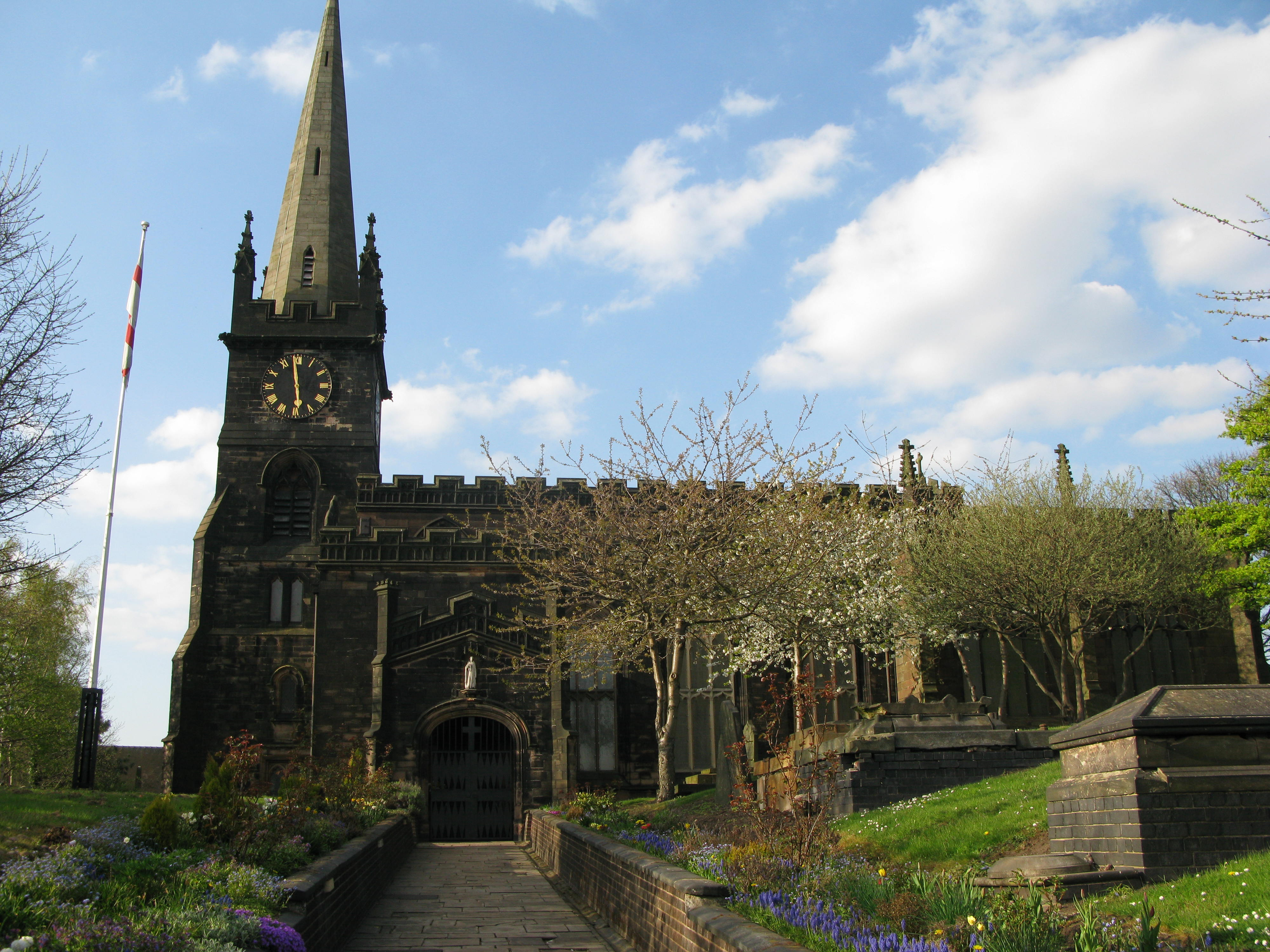
Church of St Bartholomew, Wednesbury. 13th-century traces remain, but it was substantially rebuilt in the 18th century.
52°33′22″N 2°01′13″W

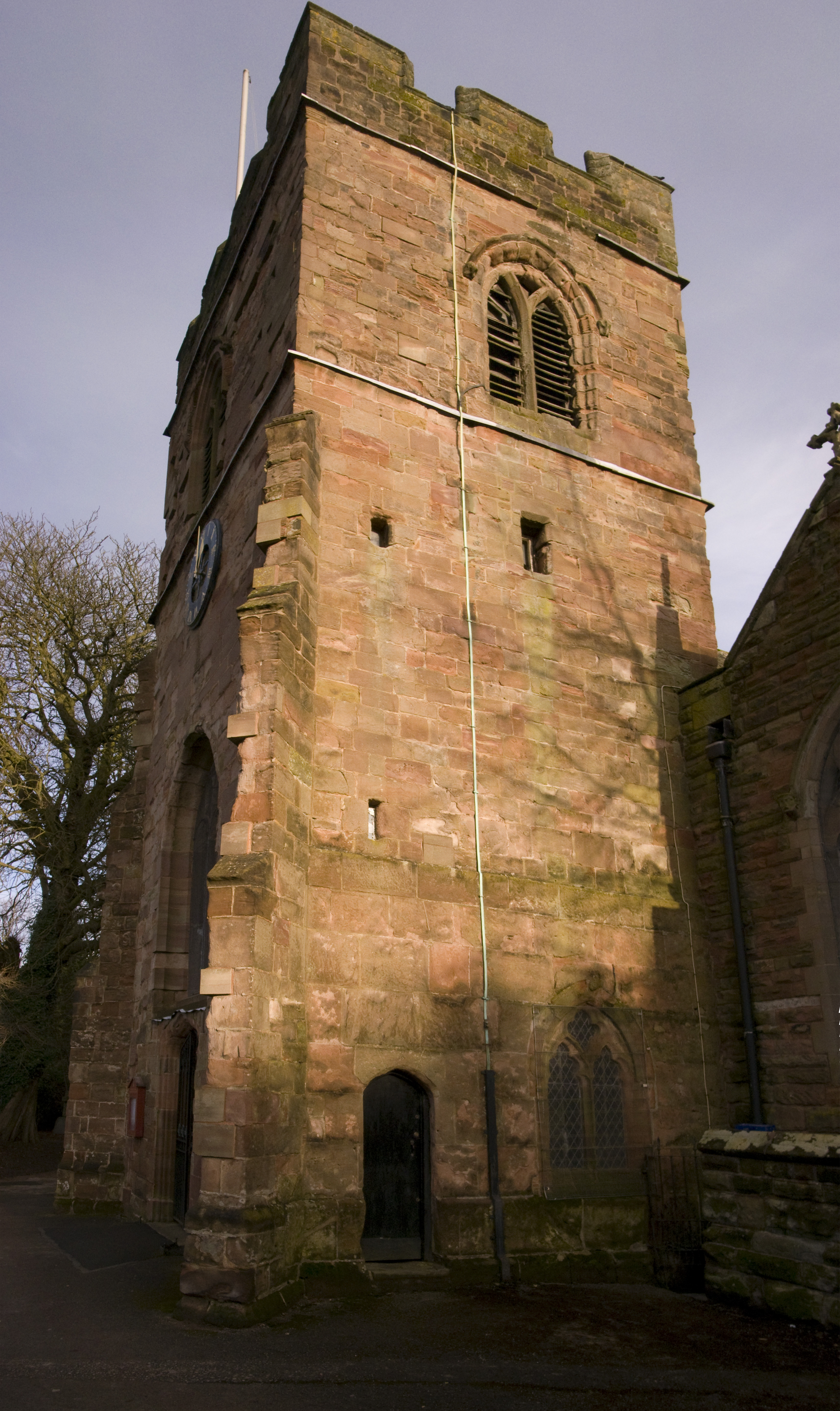
Church of St Peter, Harborne. The west tower, 15th century, is the only medieval feature.
52°27′15″N 1°57′31″W

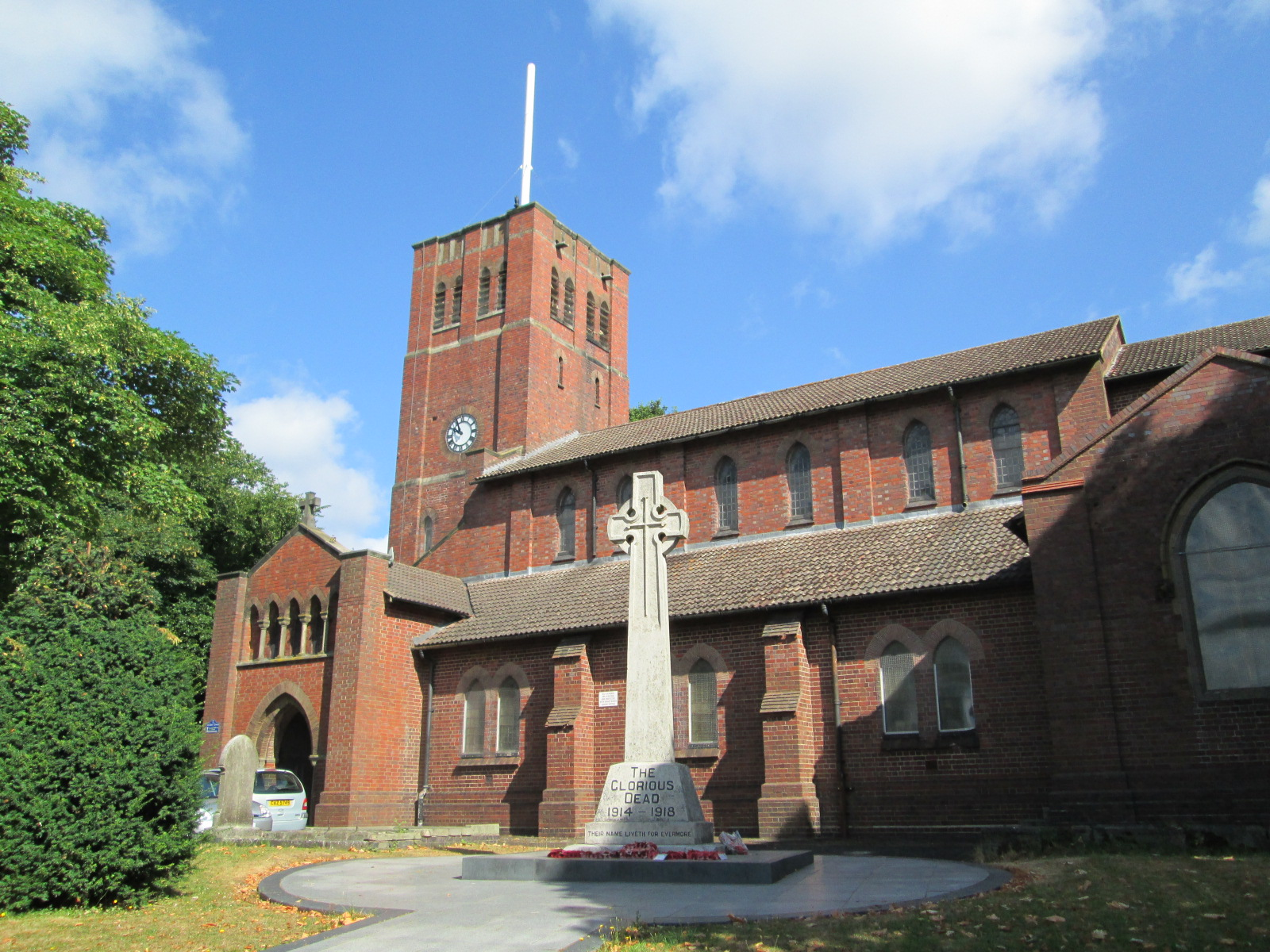
Church of St Giles, Rowley Regis. 1923 building on the original site.
52°29′05″N 2°02′43″W

Controlled churches: images and locations

In 1478, the convent at Halesowen Abbey stated that the abbey controlled three churches: the parish churches of Halesowen, Walsall, and Clent. Behind this lay tales of all the mistakes, competing claims, royal caprice, avarice, and deceit that characterised medieval property transactions and made the apparently simple statement of fact a complex, nuanced interpretation of a chequered history.

=== Halesowen ===
The abbey had the advowson or patronage, the right to appoint a parish priest, at Halesowen, as it came with the manor. It had always belonged to the lord of the manor, except for a short time, when Dafydd and Emma held it and Dafydd gave it, with Emma's consent, to the abbot of Pershore Abbey. The abbot returned the advowson to King John when he recovered the manor for the Crown. The church was specifically included in John's gift of the manor to Peter des Roches. However, the gift did not include the tithes of the church, which went to the rector. To complete its control of the church, the abbey needed to appropriate it, installing a vicar and making an allowance from the tithes to support him. The appropriation did not occur until 1270, when Bishop Godfrey Giffard ordained a vicarage worth ten marks, to be paid in equal installments at Michaelmas and Easter. However, five years later, Bishop Giffard had to resort to a mandate to compel the abbot and convent actually to set aside an allowance for the vicar. A papal bull of 12 October 1281 from Pope Martin IV regularised the situation, along with that of Walsall church. A letter of 14 October 1283 from the same pope confirmed the presentation by the abbot and convent of one of their own canons, Robert de Croule, as vicar of the church. The Taxatio Ecclesiastica of 1291 set the value Halesowen church at £26. 13s. 4d.

After reviewing all the documentation relating to the abbey's relationship with Halesowen church, starting with Peter de Roches' original grant, Adam Orleton, Bishop of Worcester, issued an inspeximus and confirmation on 4 January 1331. While the diocese of Worcester had no authority over the abbey itself, Halesowen church preceded the abbey. It was subject to the diocese like any other parish church within it. A letter of 1313 from John de Wyke, Prior of the chapter at Worcester Cathedral, to the abbot of Halesowen relates that the prior has recently visited the appropriated parish church; it requests that the customary procuration be paid within three days and also that the abbot also send the cope in which he received a benediction at the cathedral. A reference in the Worcester annals relating to 1232 makes clear that a payment of 20 shillings and the gift of the cope were expected from the newly elected abbot, who was presumably blessed in his capacity of patron of Halesowen parish church. The prior had requested his perquisites for eight years without success, as Walter de la Flagge had been abbot since 1305, so it is not surprising that he ended his letter with the implied threat that he wished to avoid discord and litigation.

Frankley church was dependent chapel of Halesowen church, although the advowson was contested by the monks of Dudley Priory until 1297, when they quitclaimed it to Halesowen after an unsuccessful legal challenge. In 1236, Ralph, its chaplain, confessed before a meeting of the convent and the Archdeacon of Kidderminster that he had breached one of the central rights of the mother church, its monopoly of burials in the parish. He promised that it would not be repeated and passed on the offerings made at the burial to the cellarer of the abbey.

=== Other churches? ===
Victoria County History adds that by the dissolution, Halesowen Abbey had also acquired the advowsons of the churches of Cradley, Warley Wigorn and Lutley but the details are puzzling. All three churches were within the parish of Halesowen, which suggests they were dependent chapels of Halesowen church. At Cradley, for example, there is a tradition of a chapel at a spot called Chapel Leasow, close to a manor house. A chantry of Brendhall, belonging to the chapel of St. Katherine the Virgin at Warley, is mentioned in a 1309 document by which William Fokerham transferred the manor of Warley to his son. A rental of Halesowen Abbey, dated 1499–1500, mentions another chapel at Warley, St Michael's, next to Warley Grange, is mentioned. The three churches or chapels of Cradley, Warley and Lutley are mentioned together not only in the Valor Ecclesiasticus but also when their advowsons and lands were granted, together with all the estates of Halesowen Abbey, to Sir John Dudley in September 1538. The grant also refers to the vicarages and rectories of the churches, which suggests that they were independent, but the same vocabulary is used for St Kenelm's chapel, which was not: possibly all had been detached from Halesowen for the sale. All three rectories faded from existence after the dissolution of the abbey, and the Church of England parish churches serving these areas are relatively modern institutions, not directly descended from their medieval precursors.

=== Walsall and Wednesbury ===
Walsall church and its chapels were granted to Halesowen Abbey by a charter of William Ruff. William was the lord of the manor of Walsall and the Rous, Ruff or Ruffus (Note: These are all versions or translations of the same name, signifying someone with red hair, like William the Conqueror's son William Rufus. Rouse or Rous is Middle English, while the other forms are from Latin. See Hanks, Patrick; Hodges, Flavia; Mills, A. D.; Room, Adrian (2002). Oxford Names Companion. Oxford: OUP. p. 534. ISBN 0198605617.) family had held the manor since Henry II granted it to William's grandfather in 1159. The witnesses to his charter included: Peter des Roches, Bishop of Winchester; William de Cornhill, Bishop of Coventry and Lichfield; and Richard, abbot of Welbeck. The Victoria County History account of the abbey places this around 1227, the time of Henry III's confirmatory charter of the abbey's estates. However, Bishop de Cornhill's date of death is generally given as 1223, and the more recent VCH account of Walsall's churches gives an approximate date of 1220 which seems more plausible. The matter of the grant was much more problematic than it seemed at first. The church had been granted to the Bishops of Coventry by King John in 1200. It was probably seized by John in 1208, during his conflict with the Church, and its restoration may have been overlooked when the conflict was resolved in 1213 because the see of Coventry was then vacant.

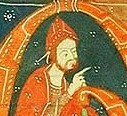
Pope Gregory IX, from a manuscript of c.1270

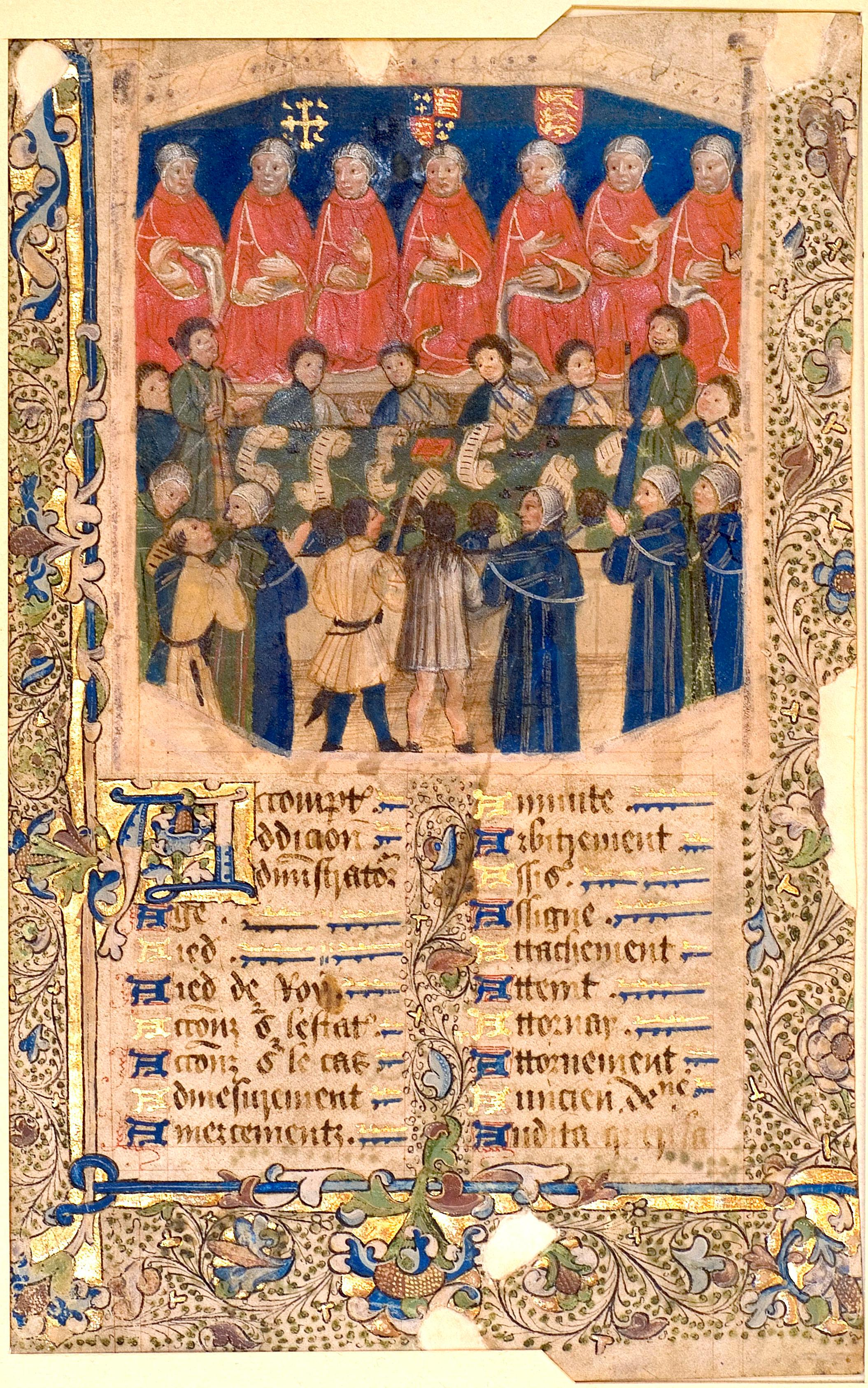
The Court of Common Pleas in session, manuscript c. 1460, in Inner Temple library.

In January 1223, William Ruffus was summoned to the Court of Common Pleas to explain why he claimed the advowson of the church of Walsall, where Magister Serlo de Sunning had been rector since his installation by King John. Serlo alleged that William had waged a feud against him for some years, seizing his goods and money, harassing his servants, and costing him a total of 200 marks. William testified that he did not claim the advowson, but only the manor of Walsall; he recognised that the patron of the church was the king. Serlo pointed out that, as a cleric, he had tried to settle the matter with William in a church court, but a writ prohibe ne procedat had prevented this. William offered trial by combat, but the court was apparently disposed to favour Serlo, who was allowed to challenge the writ blocking his resort to a church court. The evidence given by William is entirely inconsistent with his charter. If he did not hold the advowson of the church or even claim it, he could not grant it to Halesowen Abbey. The case seems to have petered out, but in 1227 the court confirmed Serlo's position and stated bluntly that the church of Walsall was "a gift of the Lord the King."

Accordingly, Henry III's recognition of the grant on 15 June 1233, more than a decade after the event, was ambiguous. Although it acknowledged that Walsall church and its chapels had been given to Halesowen Abbey by William Ruffus, it was phrased as a grant from the king himself, rather than as a confirmation, suggesting that he believed that it was really his to give. Pope Gregory IX's confirmation, issued at Perugia on 16 July 1235 was even-handed, although it introduced a new emphasis: the grant was, he claimed, made by William, bishop of Coventry, with the consent of his chapters, by a gift of Sir William Rufus, with royal assent. Despite both royal and papal confirmations that the advowson of Walsall now belonged to Halesowen Abbey, whatever its previous status and whoever the donor, Henry III presented Osbert of Maidstone to the parish on 3 June 1245. A few weeks later, on 15 July 1245, a further royal charter explicitly made a "gift" of the church to the abbot and canons from the king. The abbot began to prepare a bid to appropriate the church but ended the process when he realised that this was not the king's intention. The king's intention for Walsall became even less clear when he made Master Vincent rector of the church on 21 June 1247. It was clear that the immediate requirements of the royal family took precedence, as Vincent was tutor of the king's half-brother, Aymer, who was newly in England, seeking benefices for himself and his household. The abbot gave his approval to the king's presentation, itself an assertion of his own right to choose the rector, and the king agreed later in the year that the abbot would present in future. The abbots were able to present Premonstratensian canons from Halesowen to the church and the records show that they always did so from about 1309 to the dissolution.

Henry III now initiated the appropriation of the church, and Bishop Roger Weseham enacted it on 30 December 1248. It provided for a vicarage worth 13 marks, including the net profits of the dependent chapels of Wednesbury and Rushall, and was not to become effective until the death or departure of Master Vincent. A papal confirmation had to wait until 1281, when Martin IV sent it from Orvieto with that for Halesowen itself. A decade later, the Taxatio Ecclesiastica valued Walsall church at £12. This was evidently enough for Edward I to initiate a quo warranto in 1293, challenging the abbot of Halesowen to justify his patronage of the church. The abbot was able to produce the relevant documentation from the reign of Henry III, so the king's officials switched their attention to Wednesbury chapel, which the king denied was part of Walsall church. The jury found that Wednesbury was a mother church and so not included in the grant with Walsall. The abbey paid ten marks to restore the situation, regaining the advowson of Wednesbury. Letters patent of 5 May 1301 confirmed not just the advowson of Wednesbury but the abbey's right to appropriate it.

Although a vicarage worth 13 marks at Walsall had been provided for in 1248, it seems that it was not actually instituted until 1309, and this may be why the unbroken succession of Halesowen canons as vicars of Walsall begins in that year. In 1535, according to the Valor Ecclesiasticus, the last vicar, John Turner, had an income of almost £11 from the church, while the tithes brought in £10 for Halesowen Abbey. Although the abbey clearly regarded Wednesbury church as a dependent chapel, the king's commissioners evidently regarded it as a rectory in its own right because of the quo warranto of 1293, and they valued it separately at £5 6s 8d.

=== Harborne: a temporary acquisition ===
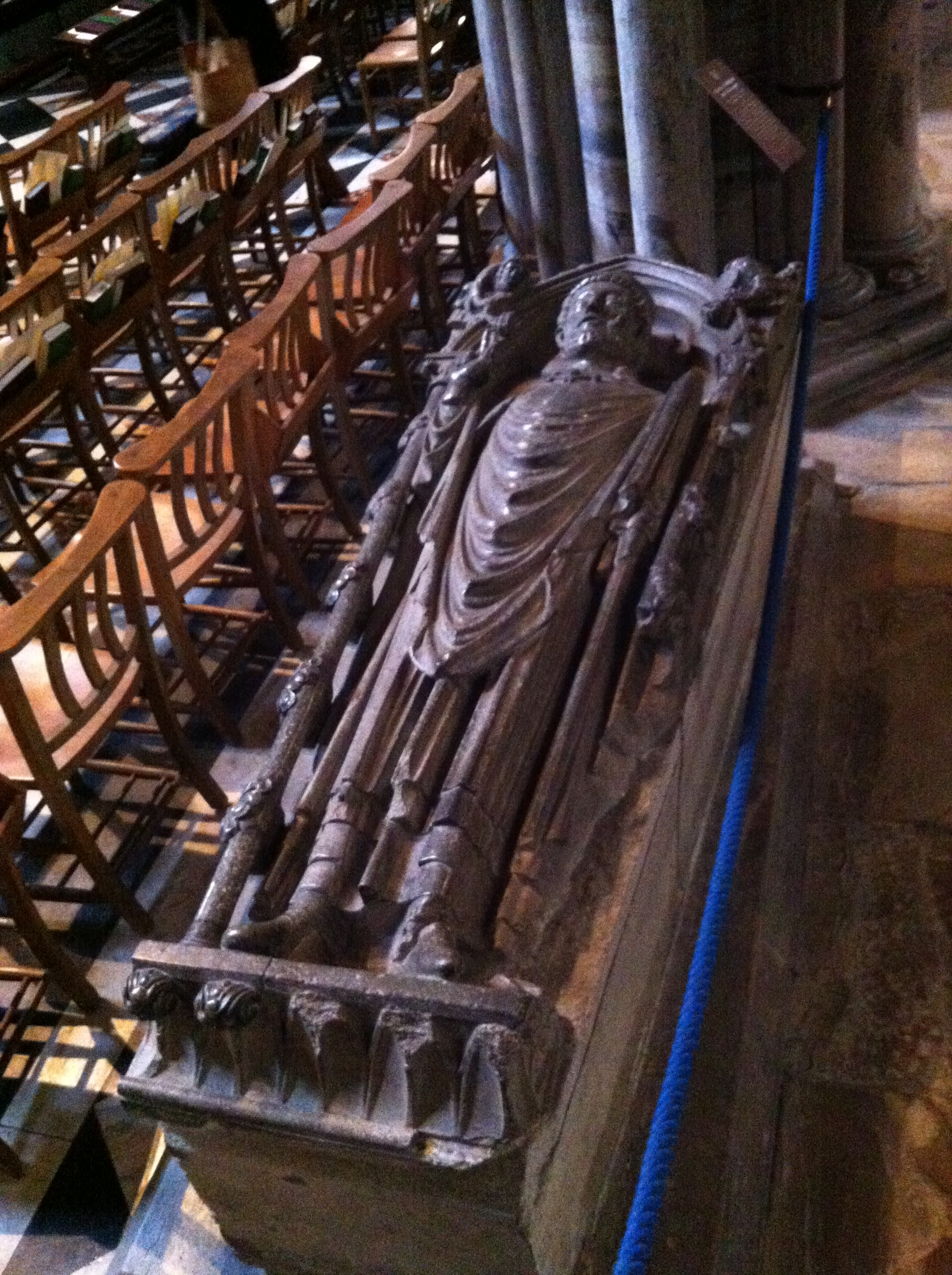
Effigy of Bishop William Kilkenny, former rector of Harborne, in Ely Cathedral.

Halesowen Abbey was granted the patronage of St Peter's Church, Harborne by Margaret de Redvers or Rivers, daughter of Warin II fitzGerold Warin had inherited Harborne manor, and with it the advowson of the church, from his father, Henry fitzGerold, who held the manor of the bishop of Coventry. In 1216 King John had ordered Thomas of Erdington, the sheriff of Staffordshire, to seize Harborne: part of a batch of confiscations into the hands of Thomas as a tactic in the First Barons' War. Warin died in 1218. The seizure of Harborne manor threw into question Margaret's right to dispose of anything appertaining to it, including the advowson. Although Thomas had held Harborne only as part of his function as sheriff, he laid claim to it and the linked manor of Smethwick in 1221. In June 1222 the Court of Common Pleas made an investigation into whether Thomas of Erdington, now deceased, had seisin of Harborne on the day of the death, as this materially affected the inheritance of his son, Giles. Margaret attended the assize with her second husband, Fulk de Breauté, and neither objected to it. It seems that her grant of the advowson to Halesowen Abbey came some years later, probably after 1226, when Fulk died. It also seems that she gave the manor of Harborne itself to Halesowen Abbey around the same time.

In January 1238 the abbot of Hales was involved in an assize of darrein presentment (an action to challenge the appointment of a cleric) over Harborne against the bishop of Coventry and Lichfield, Alexander de Stavenby. The case was said to involve the prebend of William of Kilkenny, a royal servant with a living at Lichfield Cathedral, who was then on a mission to the Roman Curia. It was respited to the Trinity term. There is great uncertainty about how the case arose, about William's connection with it, and how the bishop became involved at all, as he was the overlord at Harborne, not the lord of the manor. The advowson may have been bundled with other lands and rights into a benefice for William, although it is unlikely that he was actually a prebendary. However, the case must have gone against Halesowen, as the abbot was compelled to remit all claim to the advowson on 13 October 1238.

In 1255, when William of Kilkenny gave up the post of Lord Chancellor to take up his duties as Bishop of Ely, Henry III presented his successor Henry Wingham to the church of Harborne. The king claimed to be acting as guardian of Baldwin de Redvers, 7th Earl of Devon, Margaret's grandson. The appointment had to be cancelled, as the king discovered that Bishop Roger Weseham had already presented a candidate. He then obtained the advowson through an assize of darrein presentment and mandated Roger de Meyland, Weseham's successor, to institute Robert of Reading in the church on 28 March 1257. As the advowson had now been reclaimed for the successors of Margaret de Redvers and Warin fitzGerold, it was open to the abbot of Halesowen to argue that Margaret's grant made the abbey the true patron of Harborne church. This he did in October 1260, by a plea that Baldwin should permit him to present a parson at Harborne, only to be told that a further presentation had been made by the bishop, this time with the assent of the Roman Curia. However, the abbot argued that the bishop's candidate, a Roman known as Henry de Ganio, had breached clerical celibacy by taking a wife called Sibilla, and so the church was vacant. The bishop was ordered to enquire whether this was so and to report back by 12 November. This seems to have proved the abbot's point, and on 15 May 1261 Baldwin acknowledged the advowson of Harborne to be the right of the abbot and his successors. However, Henry did not simply disappear but continued to argue his case, with papal support, in the chapter of Lichfield Cathedral until 1279. This was accompanied by further wrangling between the abbey and the diocese, which led the abbot of Halesowen to give up all claims to the advowson in favour of the Dean of Lichfield and his chapter in 1278.

=== Clent ===
After Edward I's Statutes of Mortmain, it became more difficult and expensive to make donations to religious houses, and licences had to be secured in advance for a particular grant. On 24 March 1340 Edward III issued a licence for John Botetourte, lord of Weoley (also called Northfield), to alienate in mortmain the advowson of the parish church of Clent and Rowley and its chapels to Halesowen Abbey, along with two acres of land at Clent. John had only just come of age and taken over his manors, including Weoley and Clent, which he inherited from Joan Botetourte. Victoria County History identifies John as Joan's son. Joan's grant of Warley to Halesowen Abbey in return for the establishment of chantries mentions John Sutton II who was the son of Margaret, her sister, but never mentions her own son by name, although he must have been about 19 years old at the time.

St Kenelm's Chapel

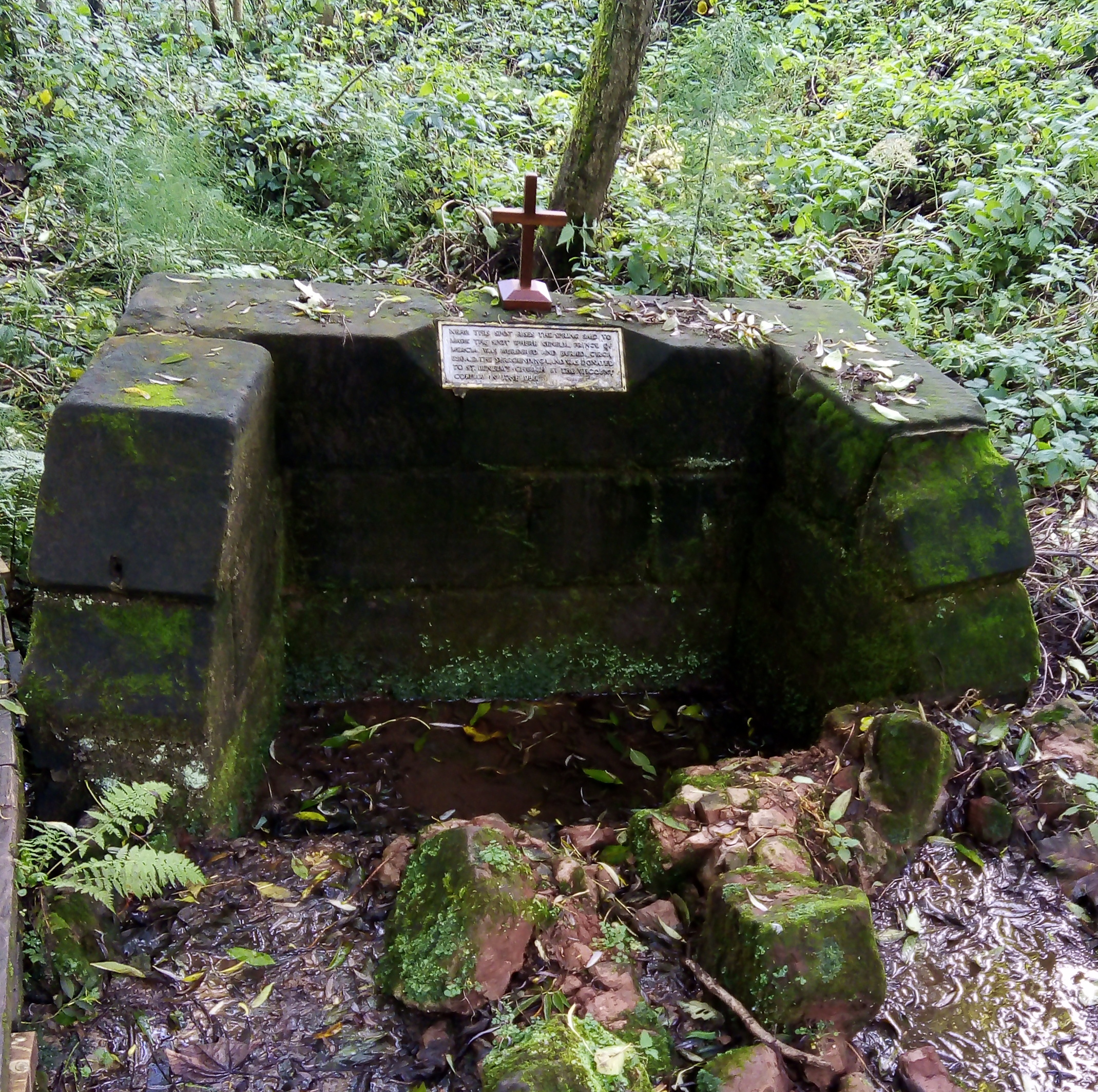
Pool, considered thaumaturgic, immediately east of St Kenelm's Spring, Romsley, with commemorative plaque dated 1985.

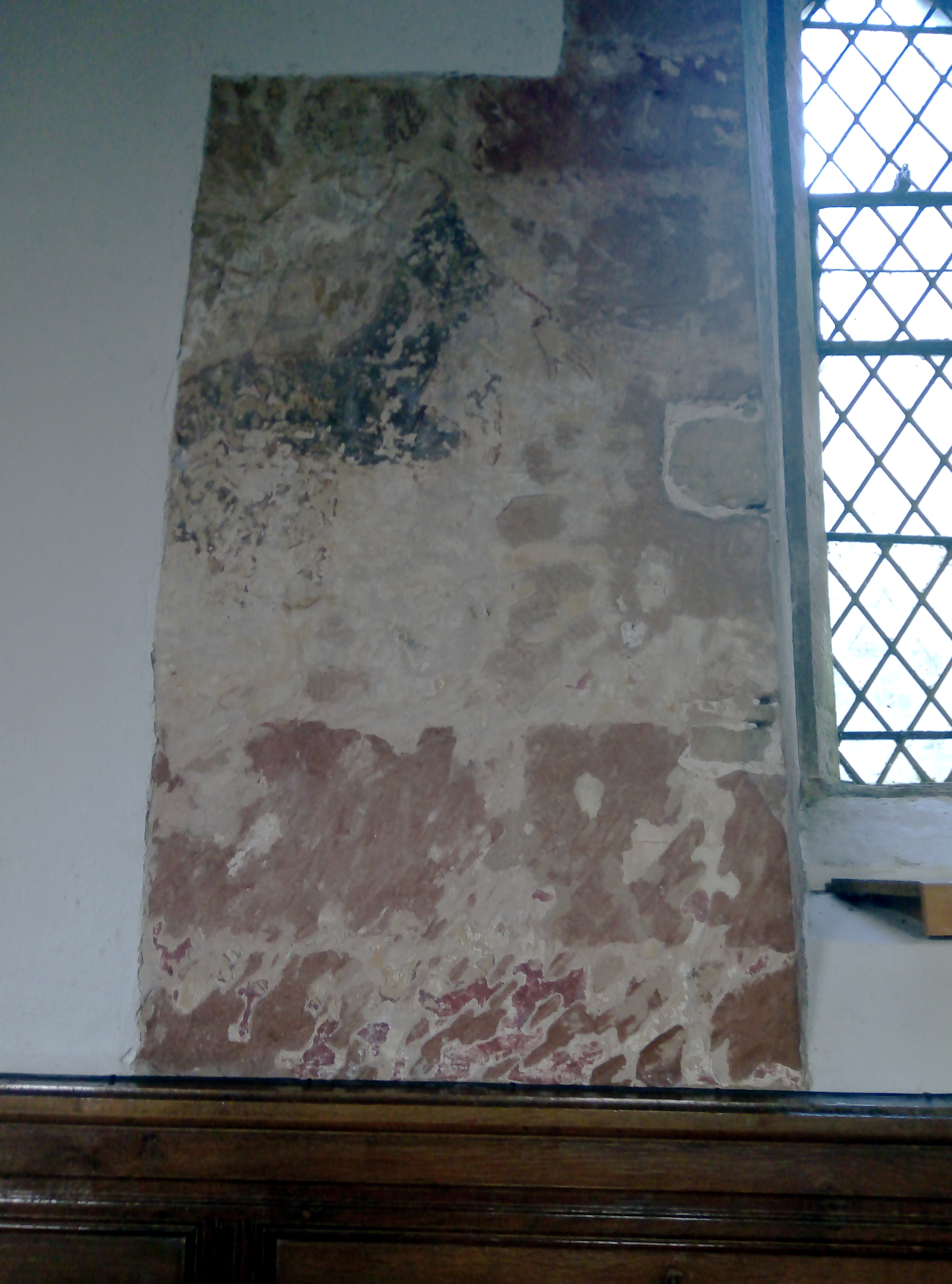
Medieval wall painting in chancel of St Kenelm's Church, part of a series originally depicting events from the saint's life.

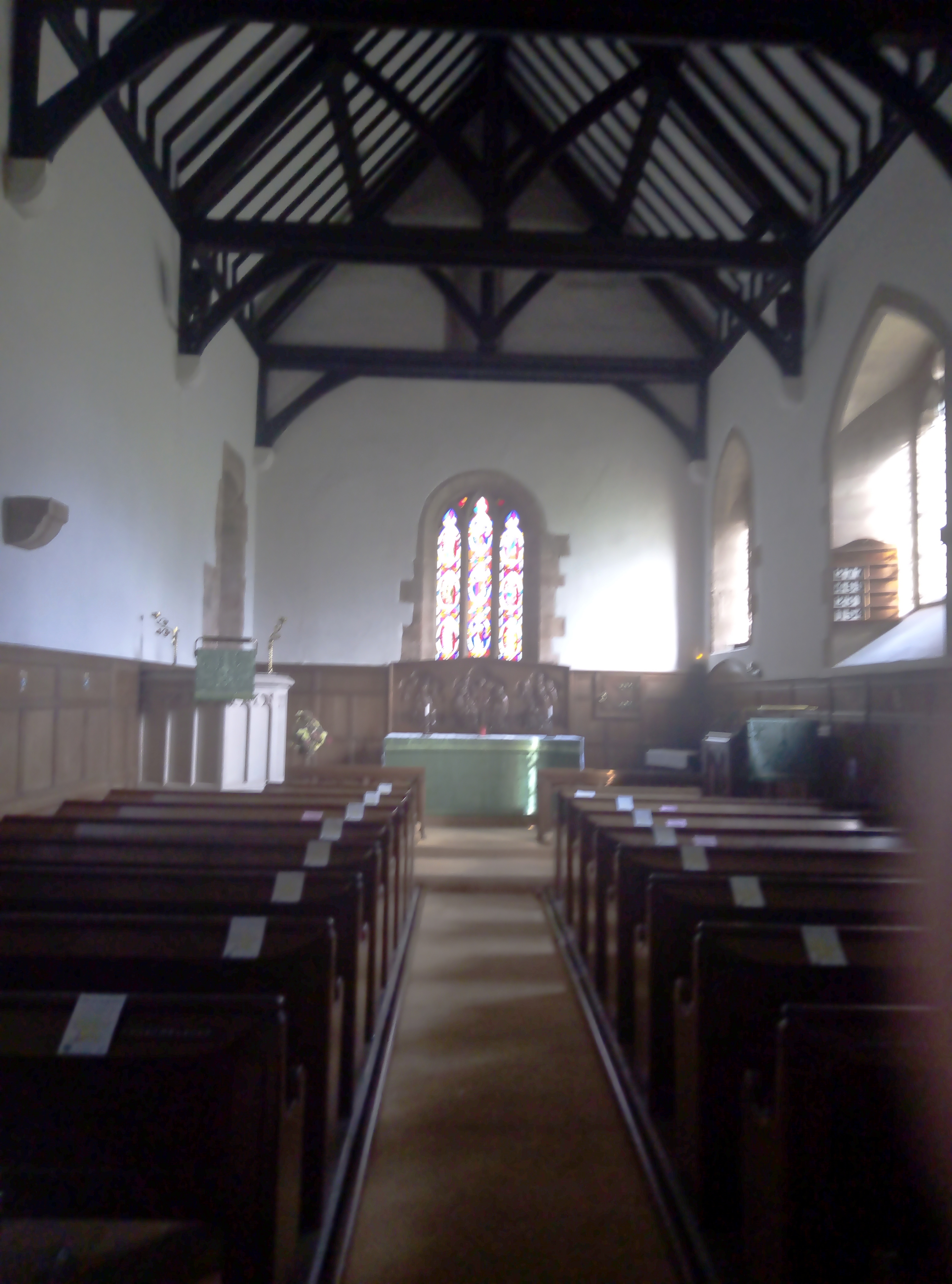
The nave and chancel of St Kenelm's Church, formerly a chapel of Halesowen but now the parish church of Romsley.

Obits at St Kenelm's Chapel

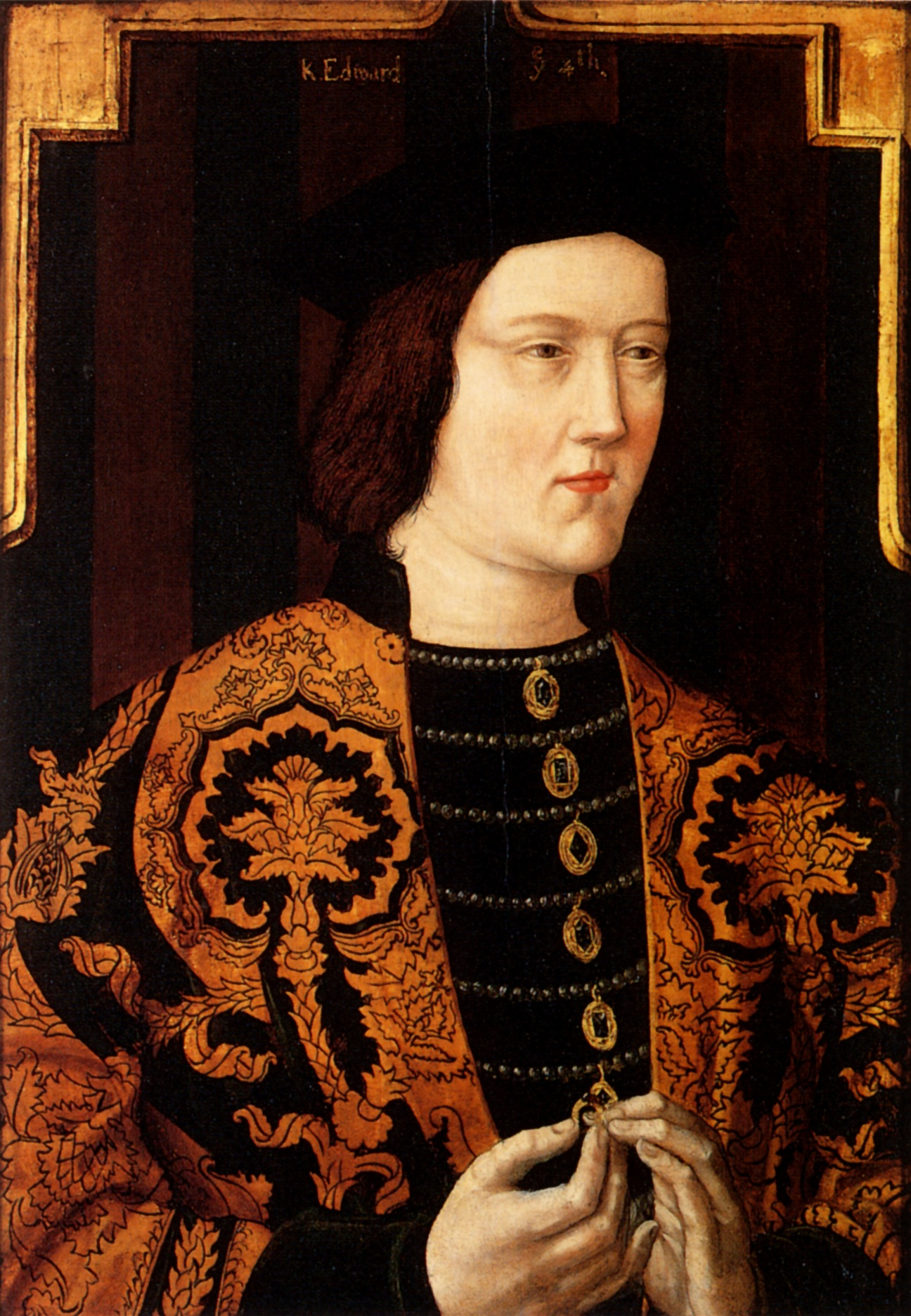
Edward IV, a portrait c.1520 copied from a contemporary original.

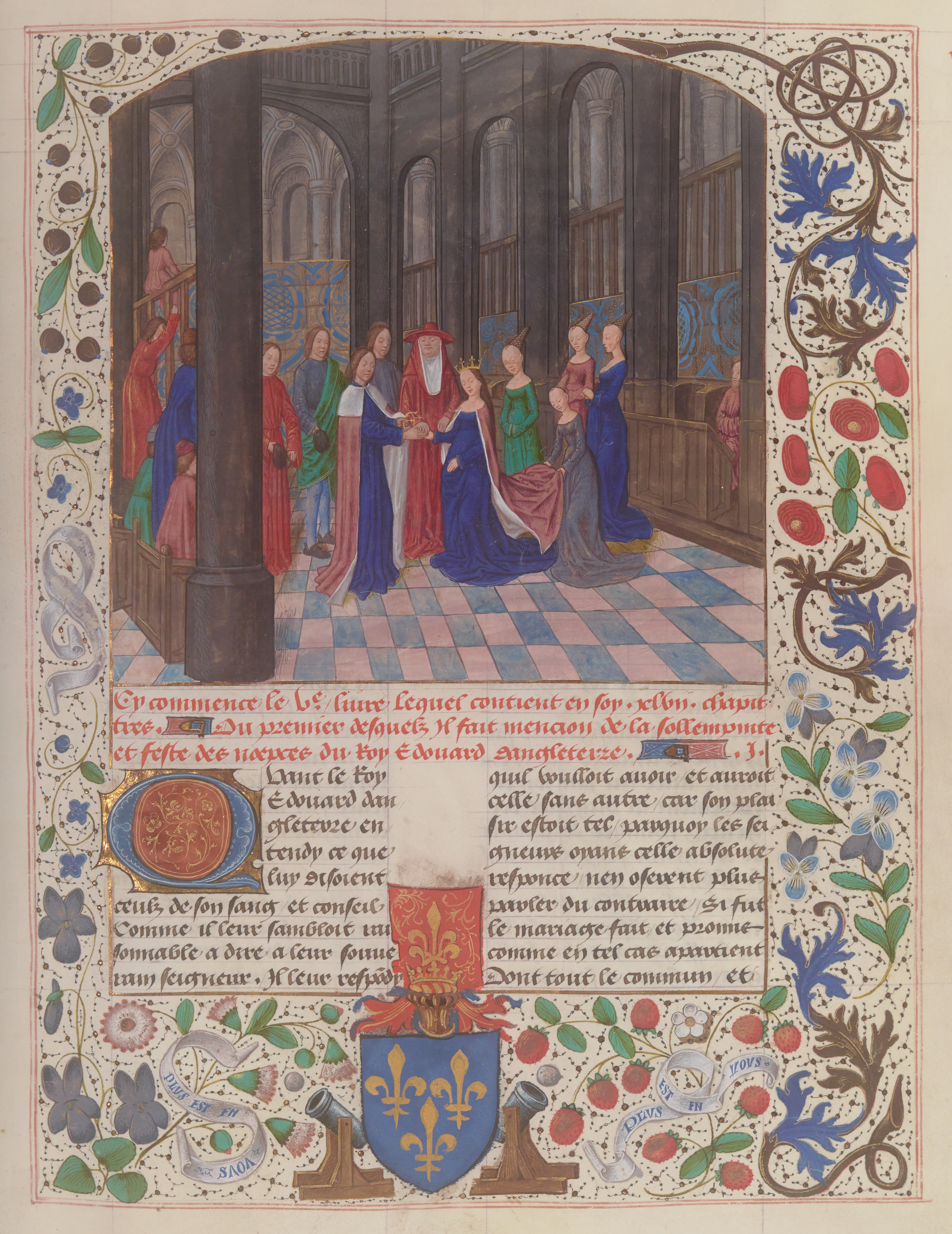
Marriage of Edward IV and Elizabeth Woodville. From Anciennes chroniques d'Angleterre by Jean de Wavrin.

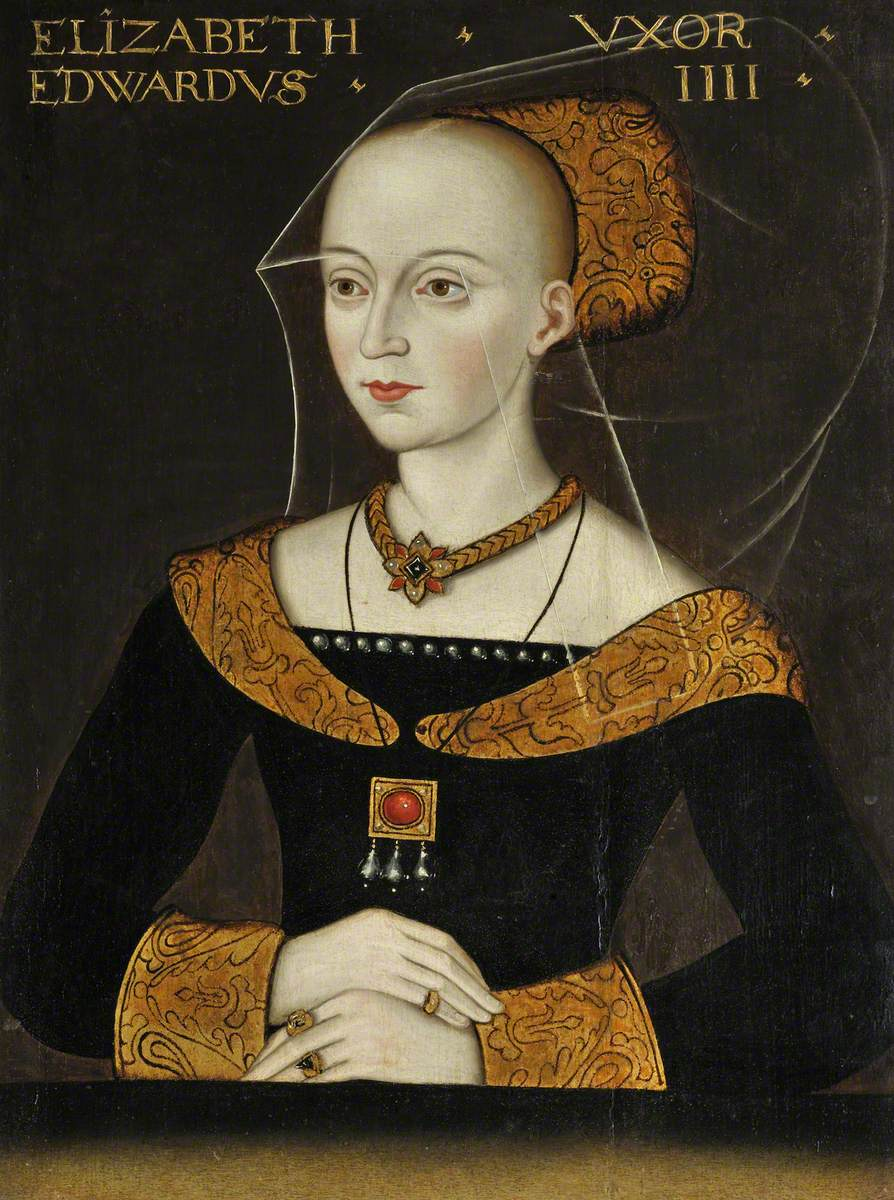
Elizabeth Woodville, probably part of a series of copies from an original, c.1471.

Like Halesowen, Clent had been a royal demesne and its rents had gone to Emma of Anjou in the reign of Richard I, but John had granted it to Ralph de Somery, Baron of Dudley, in 1204, at a rent of £4 13s. 4d. The rent was paid via the sheriff of Staffordshire: Clent was at that time in Staffordshire, one of a small number of Staffordshire parishes assigned to the diocese of Worcester instead of Lichfield. Joan had presented John Honeworth to the church of Clent and the chapel of Rowley as recently as 1332, and was wise enough to get her action ratified by the king, "notwithstanding any rights of the king therein, by reason of the lands of the said Joan or her ancestors having been at any time in the hands of him or his progenitors, or otherwise." So John's right to use or dispose of the advowson was fairly well established. His charter to Halesowen Abbey was issued at Weoley after the king's licence; he prefaced it by stating that it was "for the health of my own soul, and the souls of my ancestors and descendants". The abbot and convent of Halesowen paid the trivial sum of half a mark (6s. 8d.) for a confirmation of the grant by Richard II in 1393.

The abbey moved quickly and appropriated the church of Clent in 1343. As justification, the abbot pointed to the high cost of hospitality, as Halesowen was on a main road, and the recent losses of income: there had been a major fire in the borough of Hales and a decline in veneration of the head of St Barbara one of the abbey's most important relics. John Botetourte confirmed the abbey's appropriation subsequently. The church had been worth £18. 13s. 4d. at the Taxatio of 1291—2: after the allowance for the vicar, the abbey was making £5 6s 8d. in 1535.

In 1467 the abbey was licensed by Edward IV to acquire property worth £10 a year to support a chaplain and maintain the building at the chapel of St Kenelm which seems to have been partly in Clent parish and partly in Romsley: the grant of the abbey lands to John Dudley refers to the church as "St. Kenelm in Kelmestowe and Ramesley" as well as to "St. Kenelm, Salop" The annual fair of St Kenelm, beginning on 17 July, was held in the chapel yard, and it is this that seems to have been in Romsley and thus Shropshire. The king's licence specified that the chapel was to be a chantry for the souls of the king and Elizabeth Woodville, the queen. It cost the abbey the very large sum of £40.

== Dissolution and after ==
=== Suppression of the abbey ===
The Valor Ecclesiasticus of 1535 found that the net income of Halesowen Abbey was about £280, the fourth highest among Premonstatensian houses in England and surpassed only by Torre, Croxton and Cockersand. This placed it well above the threshold of £200, which would have brought dissolution as a lesser monastery in 1536. It seems, however, that Thomas Cromwell extracted from the abbey £4 on 11 January 1536 and the same sum on 26 March 1537. The surrender of the abbey was signed and sealed in its chapter house by William Taylor, the last abbot, on 9 June 1538. It was handed over to Thomas Legh, who wrote a covering letter, confirming the dissolution, to Cromwell three days later, when he despatched the surrender to him.

Some time that year or early in 1539 the moveable property, plate, lead, bells, and buildings of the abbey were sold and the receipts entered at the Court of Augmentations under the name of the "late commissioner", John Freman. Some items were acquired for Halesowen church. £2 13s. 4. was spent on the organ and a further £2 on its repair and installation. A cross and an image of St. Kenelm were also purchased, and 6d. was spent on transporting three cartloads of "stuff" from the abbey - possibly unsold material.

=== Disposal and dispersal of estates ===
Halesowen Abbey: the inheritors

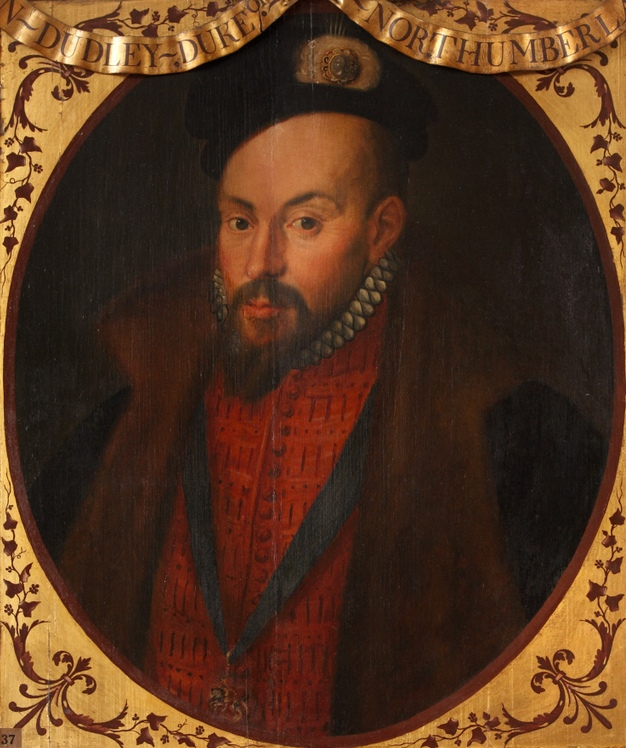
John Dudley, later Duke of Northumberland. Oil on panel at Knole.

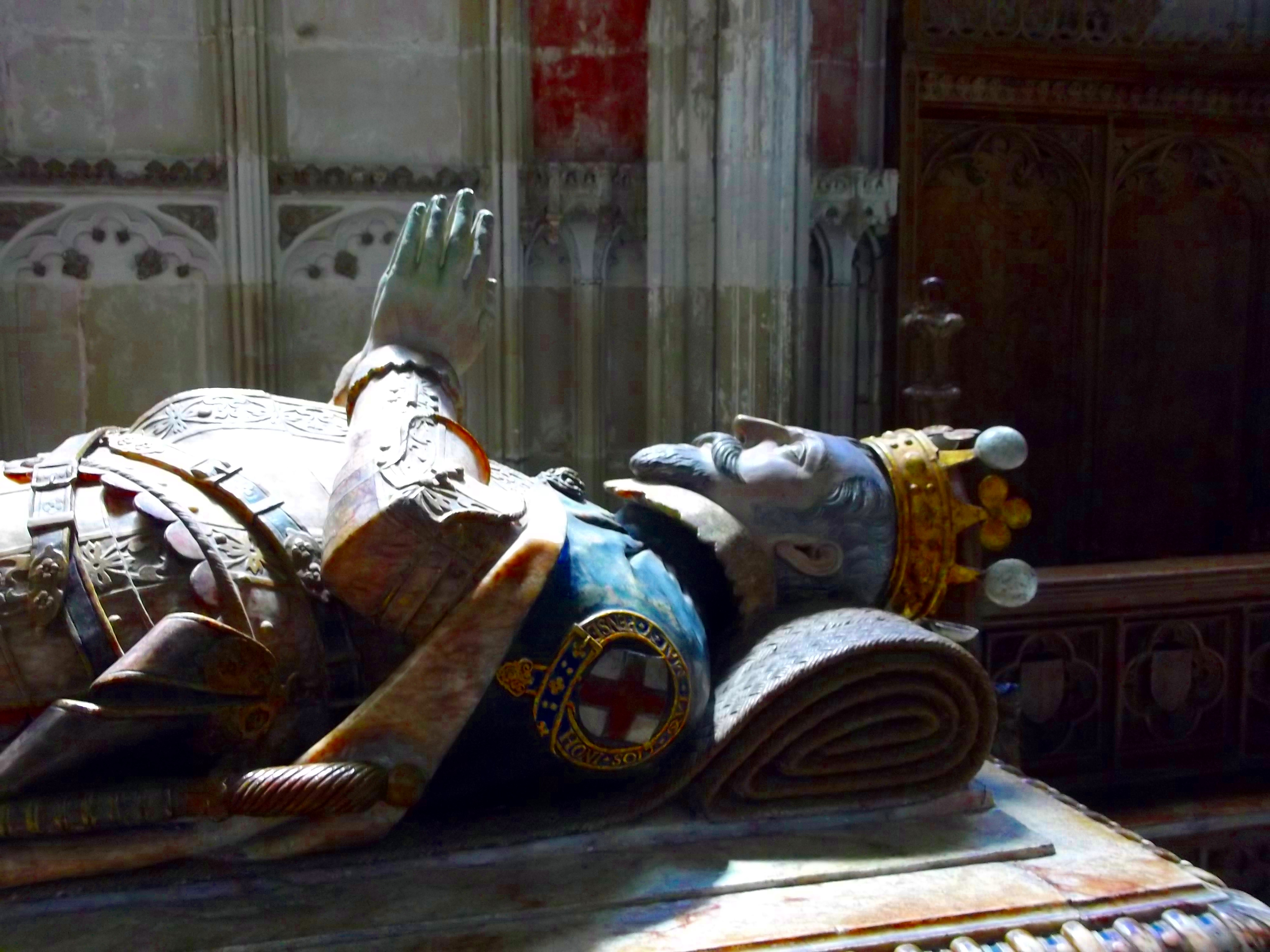
Effigy of Ambrose Dudley on his tomb in Collegiate Church of St Mary, Warwick.

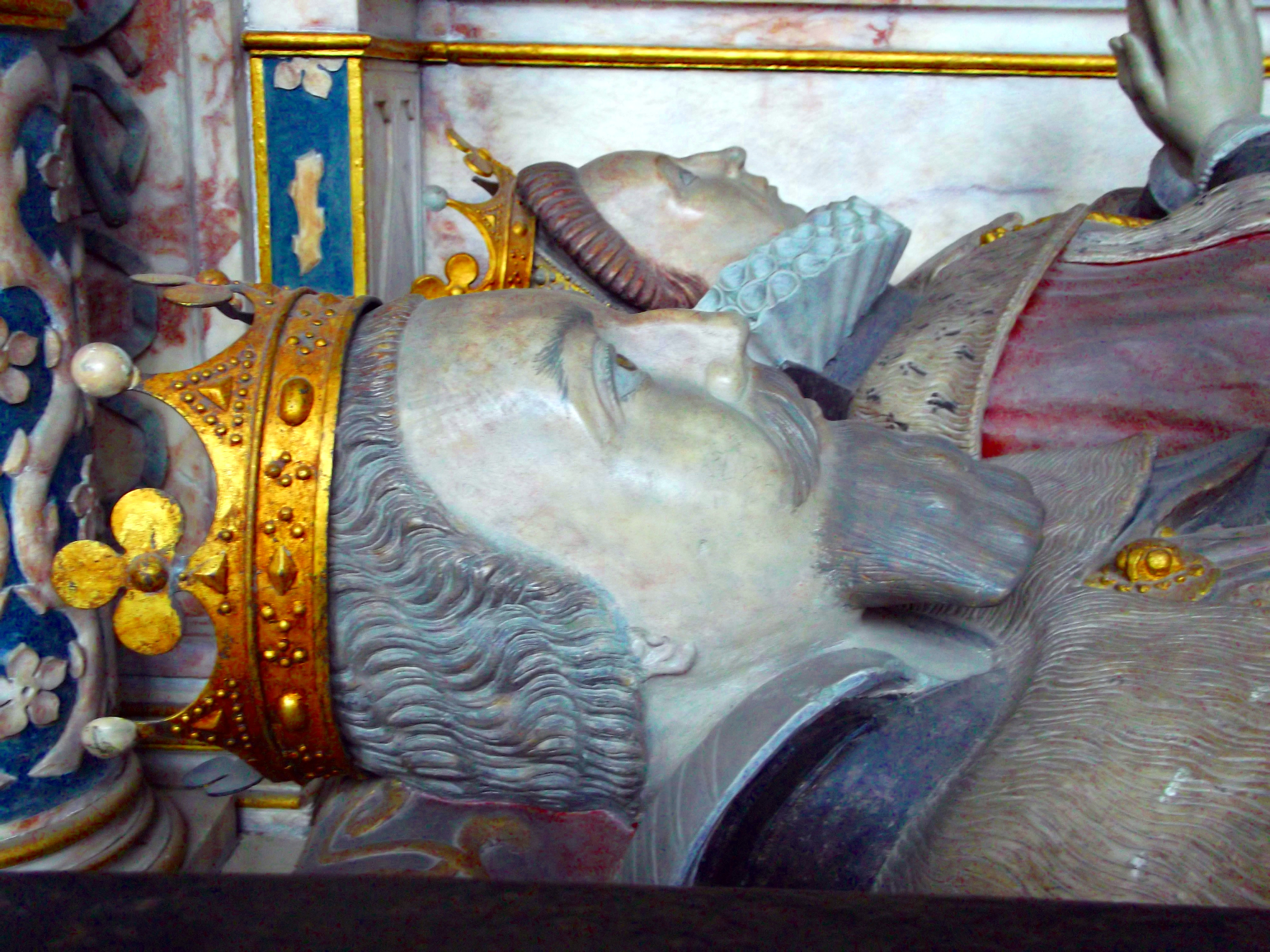
Effigies of Robert Dudley and his second wife, Lettice Knollys, on their tomb, Warwick.

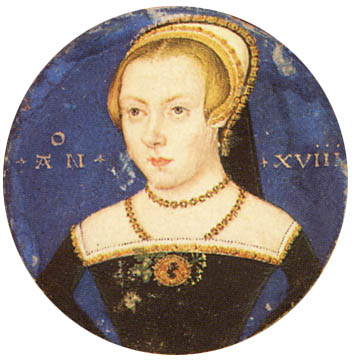
Portrait miniature of an unknown lady, possibly Amy Robsart, first wife of Robert Dudley.

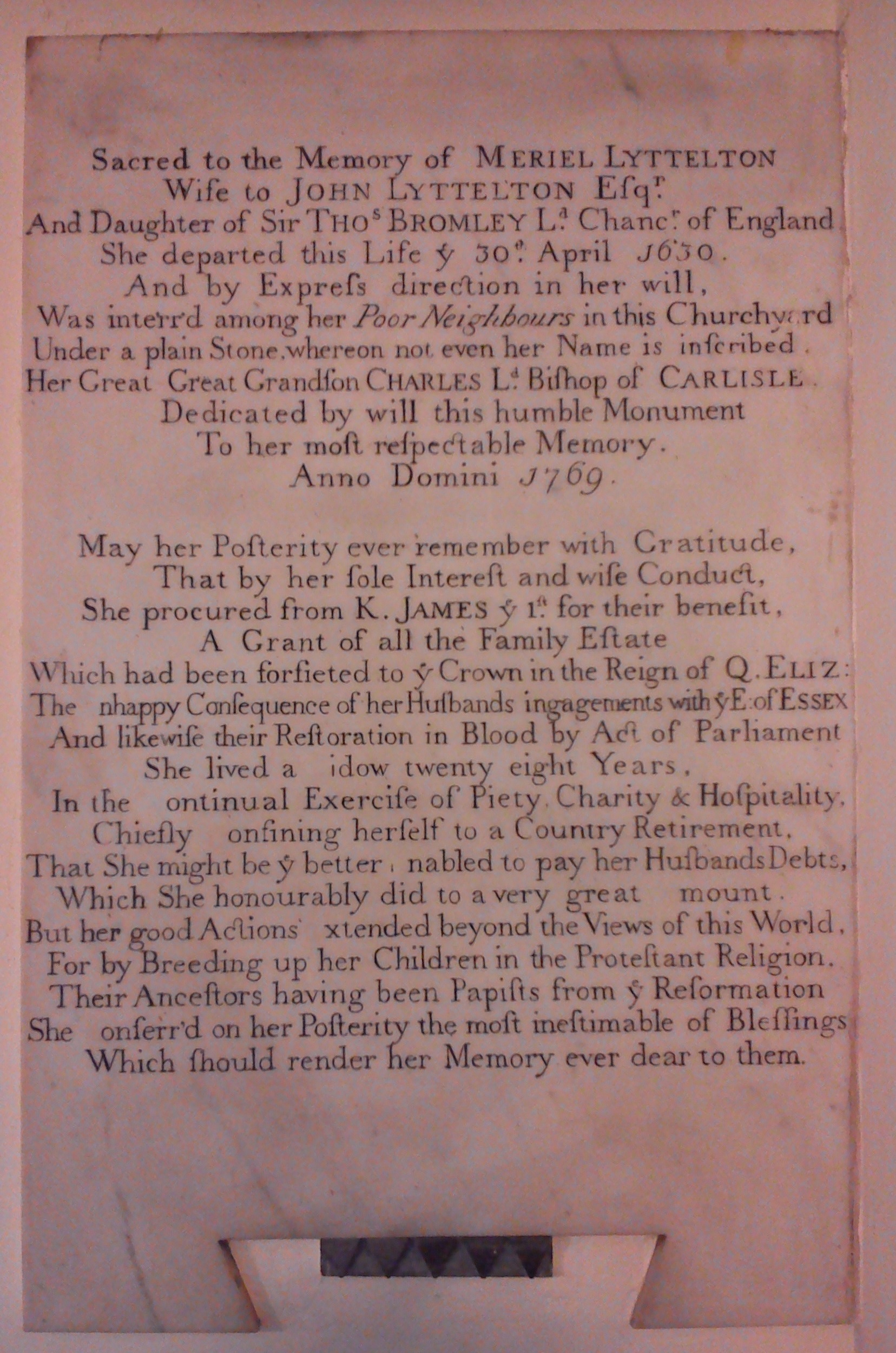
Memorial to Meriel Lyttelton, Hagley parish church.

The abbey's lands were granted Sir John Dudley on 1 September 1538 at a very favourable rent of £28 0s. 15d. He granted the "mansion of the manor", probably the remains of the abbey, to his servant George Tuckey. Already a successful and wealthy royal servant, Dudley went on to become the most powerful man in England under Edward VI, acquiring the titles of Earl of Warwick and Duke of Northumberland. However, his estates were confiscated on his fall and execution at the accession of Mary, and the abbey estates had divergent histories from that point, with the smaller estates tending to be dispersed through the operations of the land market.

==== Manor of Halesowen ====
With the fall and execution of Dudley in 1553 the manor of Haleswen was one of the estates which his wife, Jane managed to retain. When she died in 1555 she left it to her sons, who were attainted for treason, the greater share, with the house and land to the value of 100 marks, going to Ambrose Dudley. Ambrose and Henry gave their shares to their younger brother Robert, with the king and queen apparently confirming a third of the manor at this point. Robert seems to have settled the manor on his wife, Amy, and the pair sold it in March 1558. The estate was first transferred for the sum of £3000 to George Tuckey and Thomas Blount, who worked as agents for Robert Dudley. Anthony Forster, another servant of the Dudley family, who sometimes accommodated Amy at Cumnor Place, also signed away any interest in Halesowen and Warley. On 3 November 1558, only two weeks before Queen Mary's death, Blount and Tuckey bought a licence for £16 13s. 4d. to transfer the bulk of Halesowen manor to Sir John Lyttelton. There were two major exclusions: some lands around Oldbury retained by Amy Dudley and some lands previously left by Jane Dudley to Lord Hastings and his wife Katherine.

Sir John Lyttelton was a Protestant, although always loyal to the state. He lived to the age of 80 and asked to be buried without pomp in Halesowen parish church. His son Gilbert refused to make provision for his family and his sons, headed by John, at one point imprisoned him in his own house to extort a proper settlement of his estates. However, his wife Meriel, daughter of Thomas Bromley, a former Lord Chancellor, managed to have the estates returned by James I on 17 June 1603, shortly after his accession. The disaster had left the family burdened by debt, but Meriel patiently rebuilt its fortunes. As part of her retrenchment campaign, she had the weekly market and annual fair reinstated by a proclamation of the Borough of Halesowen on 13 June 1608. She claimed that the people of Halesowen had resorted to Sunday trading because the market and fair had lapsed. In May 1609, she was able to justify this by obtaining an exemplification of the various royal grants to Halesowen, including a grant by Edward I to the abbey of licence to hold a market every Monday, as well as a fair on St. Barnabas Day (11 June) and the three following days. The manor and borough of Halesowen thus recovered some of the privileges formerly held by the abbey, and the Lytteltons continued as the dominant landowners locally for more than three centuries.

==== Other estates ====
Halesowen Abbey: the inheritors

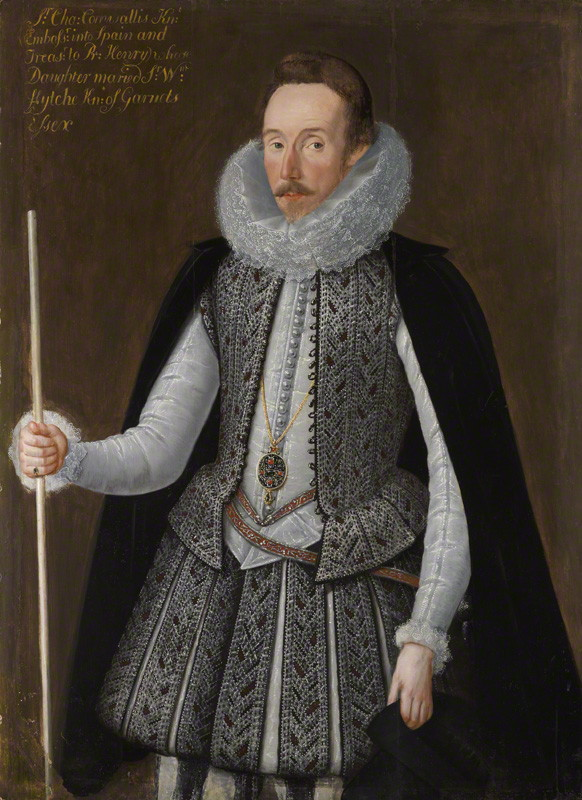
Sir Charles Cornwallis, died 1629.

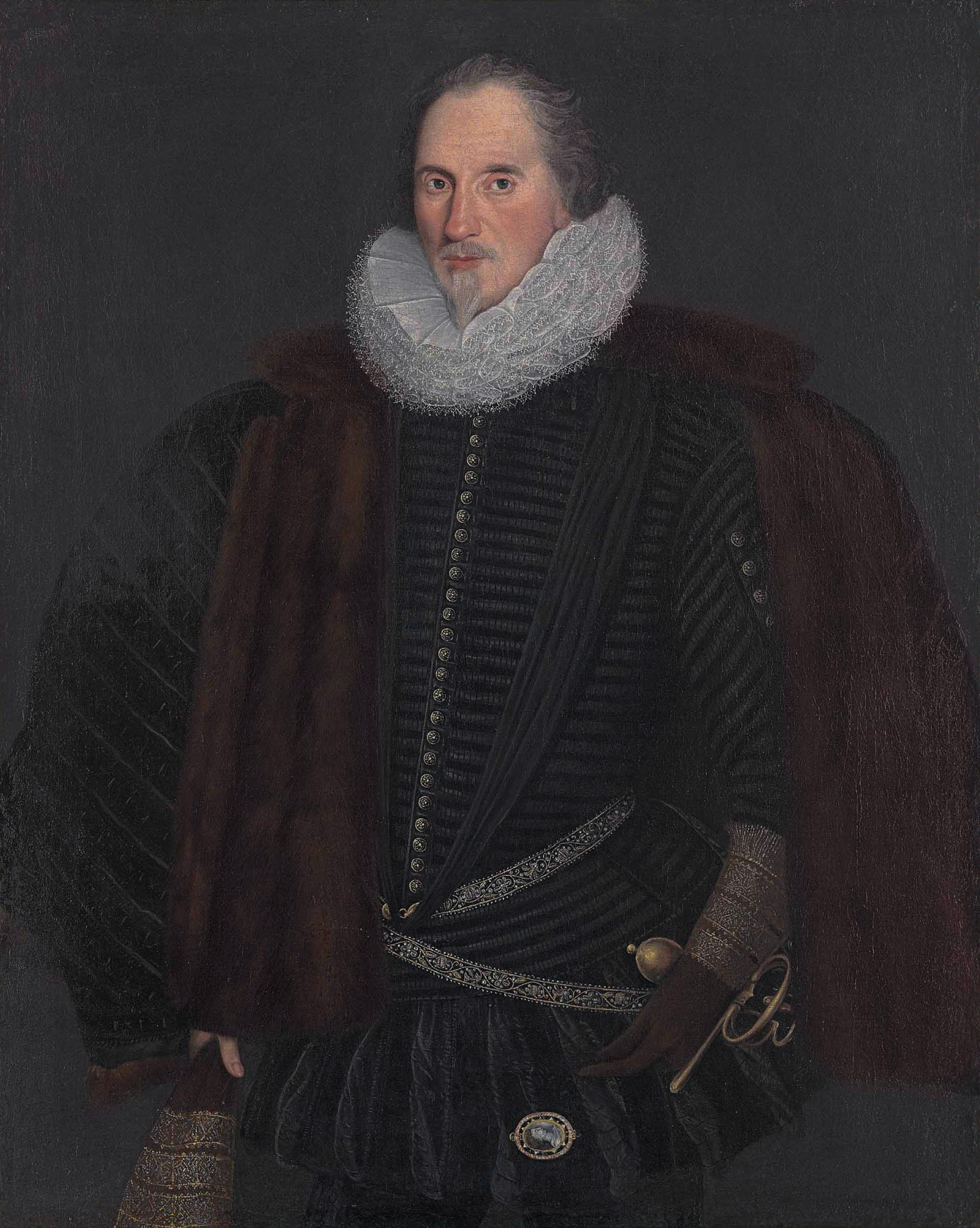
John Scudamore (1540-1623), portrayed c. 1590.

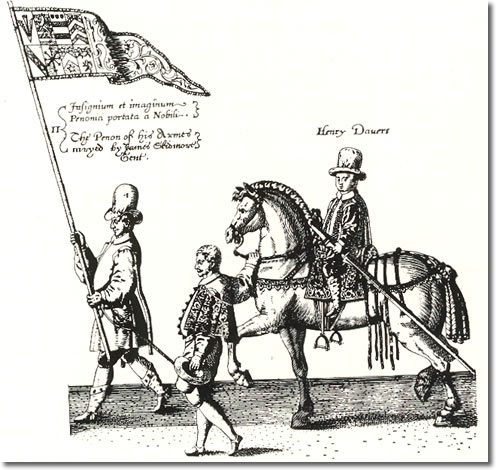
James Scudamore carrying the pennant of Sir Philip Sidney, with Henry Danvers on horseback, 1587.

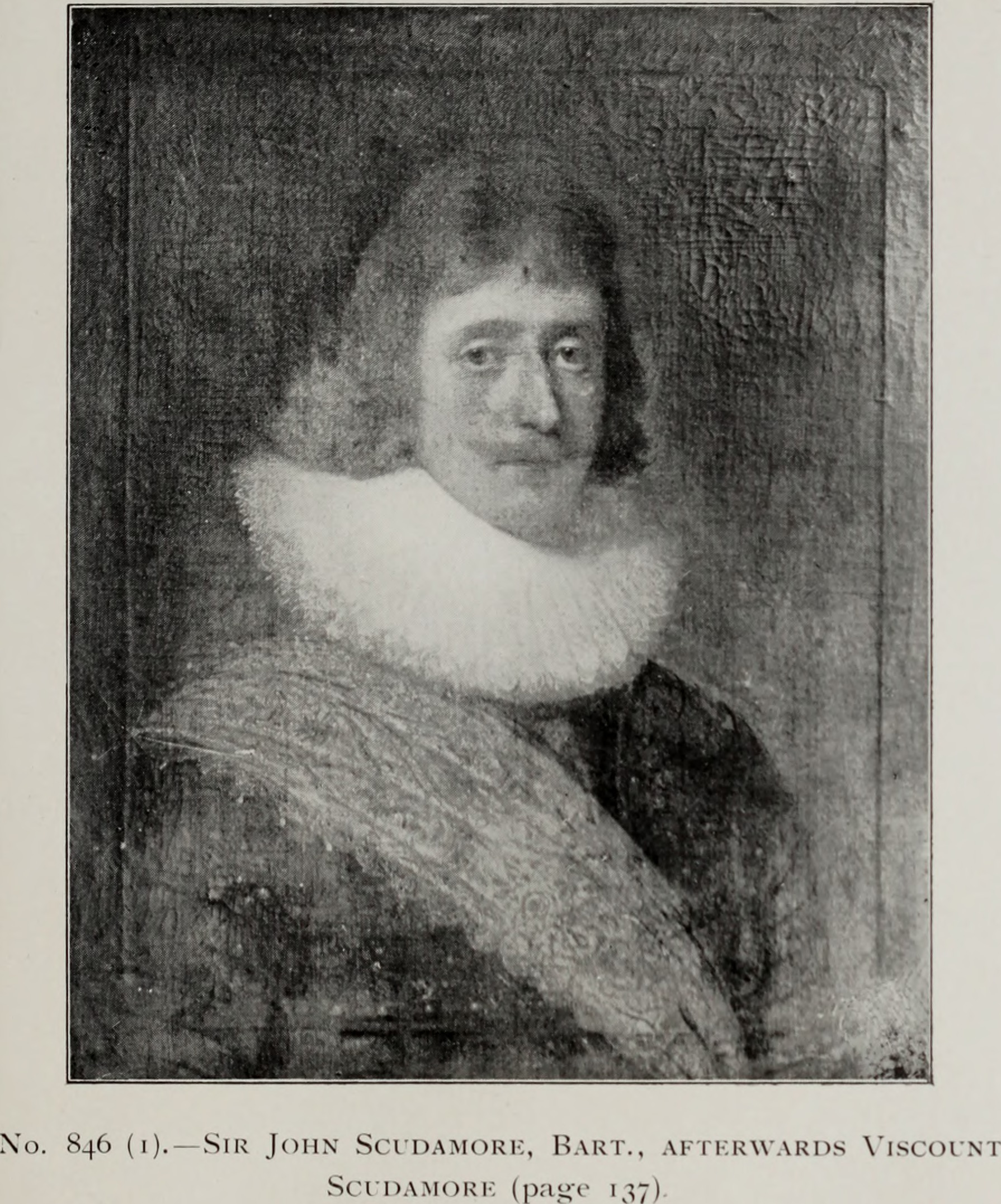
Sir John Scudamore, later 1st Viscount Scudamore.

Arms of the Keyt baronets.

John Dudley was one of those who had profited from the improvidence of his second cousin, John Sutton, 3rd Baron Dudley. In 1537, he had acquired from him a package of estates and lordships around Dudley, including Dudley Castle itself. Although Dudley had paid £4000, there was some sympathy for his relative, who became known as "Lord Quondam." The unfortunate baron died in September 1553, shortly after the Duke of Northumberland's execution, and was succeeded by his son, Edward Sutton, 4th Baron Dudley. As she regarded him as one of her valued supporters, Queen Mary restored Dudley Castle to him. However, she had earlier granted it to John Lyttelton and further rewarded him with estates confiscated from John Dudley. Among these were Harborne, Rowley, and Smethwick, all formerly important estates of Halesowen Abbey. Edward Sutton, 5th Baron Dudley, who succeeded to the title in 1586, was soon in deep financial difficulties and was pursued by the Privy Council for failure to maintain his family, as well as facing the Star Chamber over his violent feud with the Lytteltons. In 1604, he conveyed Harborne and Smethwick by fine of lands to Charles Cornwallis for £400. The manor was described as containing 100 messuages, 10 cottages, 10 tofts, 100 gardens, 400 acres of land, 100 of meadow, 400 of pasture, and 60 of woods. Cornwallis had a colourful political and diplomatic career as a member of the Blessed Parliament and ambassador to Spain, and spent a year in the Tower of London when his anti-Scottish views upset James I. Although a Suffolk man and a Norfolk landowner, he spent his later years at Harborne, where he died in 1629. His eldest son, the essayist William Cornwallis, predeceased him so the manor of Harborne and Smethwick passed to his grandson Charles, who sold it to Thomas Foley in 1661. Thereafter, the manor and its lands were sold on at intervals. By the early 20th century the lord of the manor was the Marquess of Anglesey and Lord Calthorpe a major landowner. (Note: Calthorpe is still remembered in the region by the park which bears his name, which he formally presented to Birmingham (although his father created it), and as the donor of the site for the University of Birmingham.)

John Dudley seems to have sold to William Scudamore the former Halesowen Abbey lands in Church Lench and possibly Ab Lench. William died in 1560 but his young son John Scudamore only came into his lands in 1563, after a wardship: he also inherited large estates from his grandfather in 1571. He and his son James were initially Catholic sympathisers but changed their allegiance and prospered as courtiers, representing Herefordshire in the Parliament of England over more than three decades, and becoming important patrons of the arts and science. However James predeceased his father and was succeeded as heir by his son John, who became a baronet in 1620 and in 1628 the first Viscount Scudamore. He sold the manor of Church Lench to William Keyt in 1627 and it remained with the Keyt baronets until the death of Sir William Keyt at his own hand, in a fire at his estate in Gloucestershire. Thereafter, the manor and lands were dispersed more rapidly through repeated sales.

== Present day ==
The ruins of the abbey are a scheduled monument and a Grade I listed building. The abbey is managed by English Heritage, but the surrounding land is privately owned with no public access, and the ruins can only be viewed from a distance.
