= Henry Bromley (died 1615) =

English landowner and politician

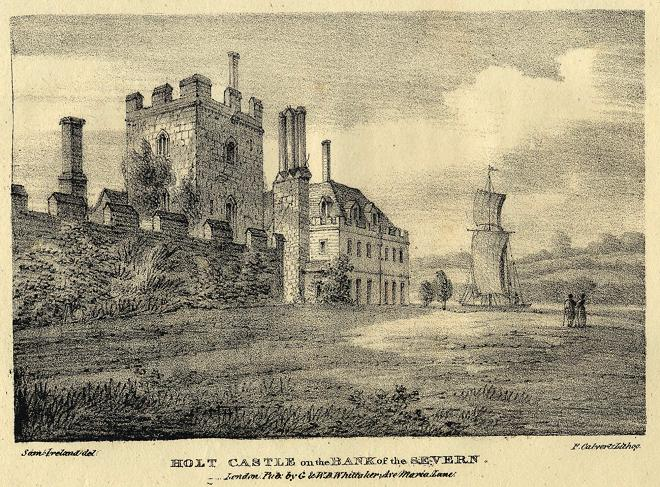
Holt Castle, Sir Henry Bromley's seat in Worcestershire

Sir Henry Bromley (1560 – 15 May 1615) was an English landowner and politician who sat in the House of Commons at various times between 1584 and 1604. He was imprisoned twice due to his political activities, with the more serious incident occurring after the Essex Rebellion. Later, during the Jacobean period, he regained favour and played an active role in suppressing the Gunpowder Plot.

== Background ==
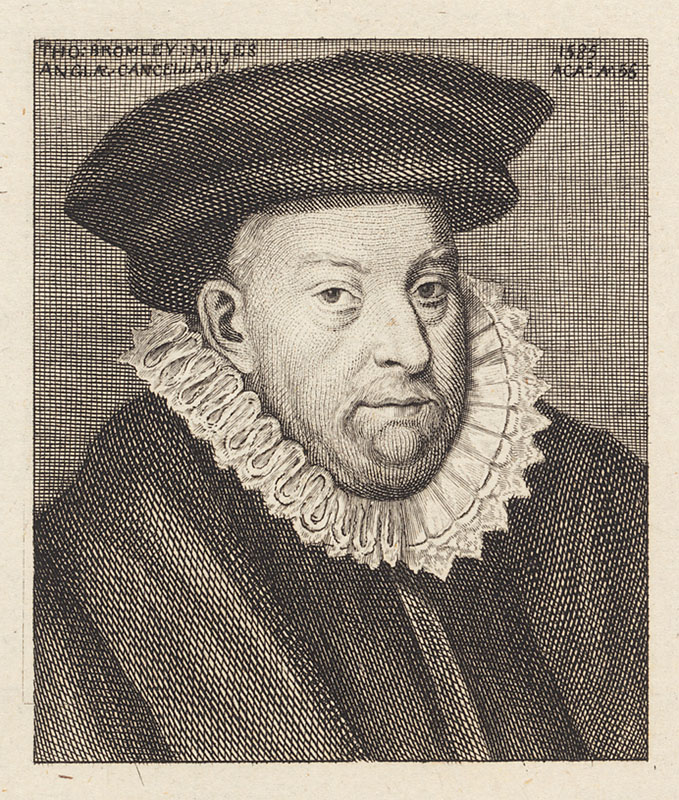
Sir Thomas Bromley, Henry Bromley's father.

Bromley was the eldest son of Thomas Bromley, who served as Lord Chancellor, and Elizabeth Fortescue, the daughter of Sir Adrian Fortescue of Shirburn, Oxfordshire. He matriculated at Hart Hall, Oxford on 17 December 1576 aged 16 He was one of a group of four students admitted freely at the instance of his father, the Lord Chancellor, by the parliament of the Inner Temple on 7 February 1580.

== Political career ==
=== Early parliamentary career and succession question ===
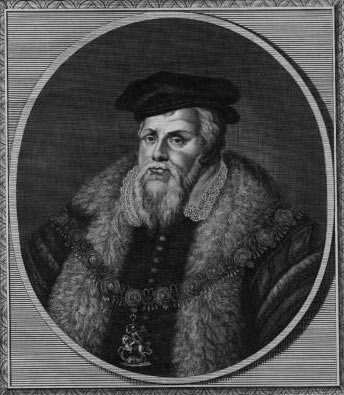
Francis Russell, 2nd Earl of Bedford, who effectively controlled Plymouth's parliamentary elections.

In 1584, Bromley was elected Member of Parliament for Plymouth, along with Christopher Harris. Plymouth was a great port, closely involved in the Anglo-Spanish War, with a tendency to support "godly" Protestants. Other MPs of the period included Arthur Champernowne, Francis Drake, Humphrey Gilbert, and John Hawkins. The MPs were elected by a "privy council," consisting of the mayor and 12 aldermen, but Francis Russell, 2nd Earl of Bedford had great influence in the town. He was a close ally of Bromley's father, the Lord Chancellor. Harris was one of his employees, so clearly he dominated the elections on this occasion. Bedford died in 1585 but Bromley was re-elected MP for Plymouth in 1586, along with Hugh Vaughan, the earl's secretary and a relative by marriage of Hawkins. Bedford's influence was largely backed by the powerful Champernowne and Hawkins trading dynasties, who probably approved of Bromley because of his father's close connection to the faction of Robert Dudley, 1st Earl of Leicester. The first two parliaments in which Henry Bromley sat were preoccupied with the trial and execution of Mary, Queen of Scots, in which Thomas Bromley played a central role. Henry Bromley was appointed to a committee which consulted with the queen on the issue on 11 November 1586.

From about 1591 to 1601 he was JP for Worcestershire and was High Sheriff of Worcestershire from 1591 to 1592. He was knighted in 1592. In August 1594 he travelled to Stirling Castle as an attendant of the Earl of Sussex, representing Queen Elizabeth at the baptism of Prince Henry.

In 1593 Bromley was elected MP for Worcestershire, his own county, along with William Walsh, a member of a long-established Worcestershire gentry family. The MPs were almost always chosen from the county gentry and in this period, the Protestant Russell family, who claimed kinship with the Earls of Bedford were the leading political dynasty. Both Bromley and Walsh were known to be Protestants by conviction.

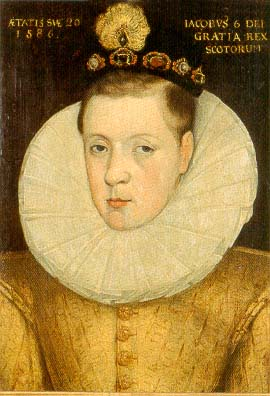
James VI, the young king of Scotland, was for long seen as a likely ally by Puritans and Catholics alike.

Bromley and Walsh were soon recruited by Richard Stephens, another Puritan MP, to support the proposal of Peter Wentworth to bring the question of succession before the House of Commons. Wentworth, then MP for Northampton, had a long history of defending free speech in the chamber of the House of Commons and of promoting Puritanism, and had previously been imprisoned in the Tower of London. A book he had written on the succession came to the authorities'notice in 1591 and he had written to Burleigh that "neither church nor commonwealth can possibly overlive Her Majesty's days, without settling the succession of the Crown." Wentworth wished Burleigh a long life, as he feared "the State will be greatly weakened when his Lordship is called away." At this point Wentworth favoured recognition of James VI of Scotland as Elizabeth I's successor. The Cecil faction were trying to keep the question open for as long as possible to prevent erosion of Elizabeth's personal authority. A small group of MPs met at Lincoln's Inn on 21 February to consider Wentworth's plan. While they hesitated, they were betrayed to the Privy Council and arrested the following afternoon. Bromley, Stephens and Walsh spent most of the session in the Fleet Prison, and were not released until late April, after the end of Parliament. Wentworth refused to apologise or give pledges of good behaviour and died in the Tower in November 1596. Meanwhile, Bromley reinforced his commitment to the cause of James VI by making direct contacts in Edinburgh.

In 1597 Bromley was elected MP for Shropshire, and thus became one of the few MPs to be Knight of the Shire for two counties. Shropshire was gentry-dominated and the main external influence came from the Council in the Marches of Wales, which represented central government in the border counties. Sir Henry had land in Shropshire and his uncle Sir George Bromley and his cousin Francis Bromley had previously represented the county. The president of the council was a political ally, Henry Herbert, 2nd Earl of Pembroke, son-in-law of the previous president, Sir Henry Sidney.

He was JP for Shropshire from about 1598 and was collector for the loan in 1598. He was active in campaigns against recusancy. In 1598 he helped search for the escaped Jesuit priest John Gerard and in the following year served on a commission with his brother-in-law, the Warwickshire MP Edward Greville, to search out recusants' goods and lands. In 1600 he was assessed, as of Shropshire, to furnish one horse for service in Ireland. This was for the expedition of Robert Devereux, 2nd Earl of Essex.

=== Essex rebellion ===
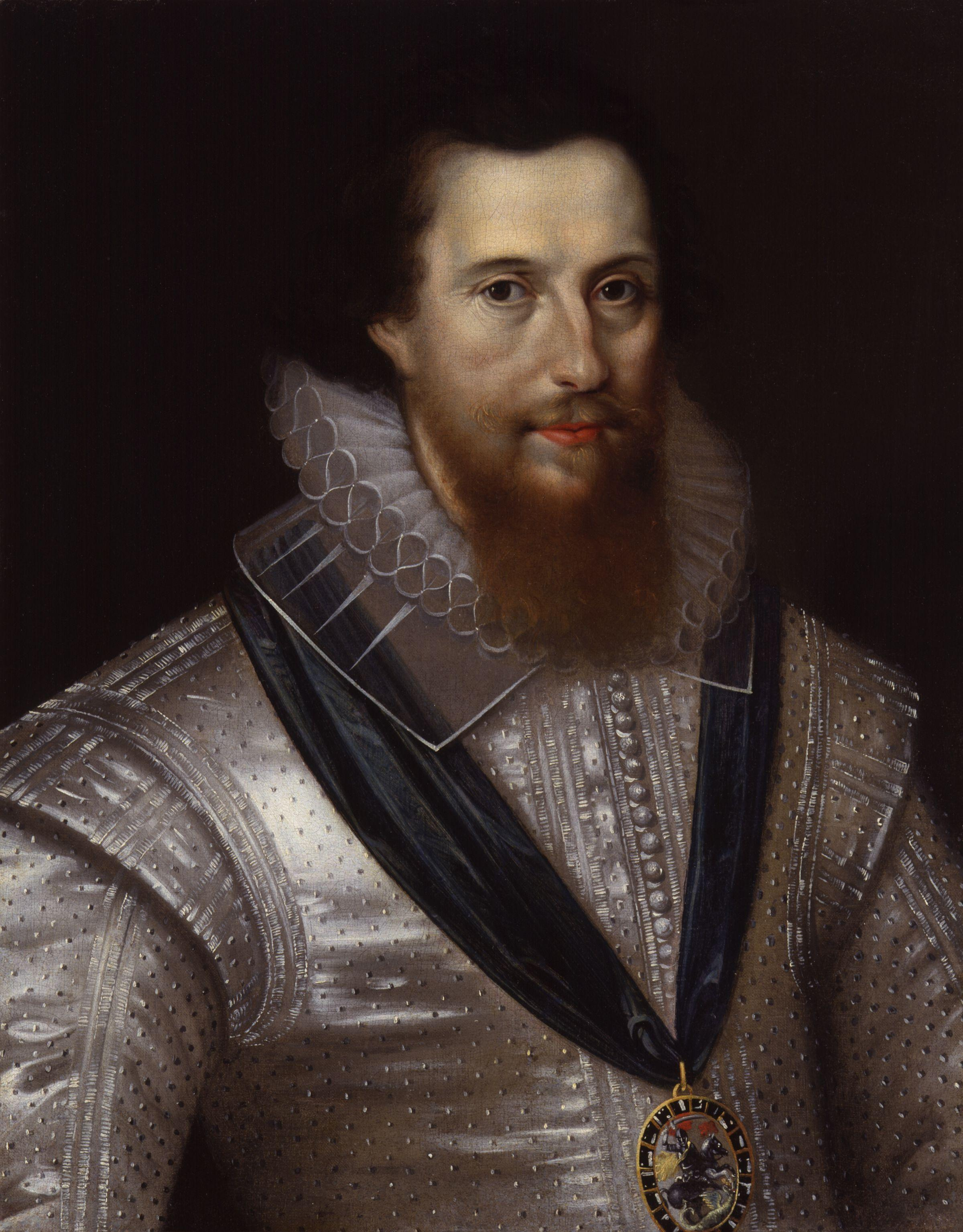
Robert Devereux, 2nd Earl of Essex, the factional leader whom Bromley warmly supported

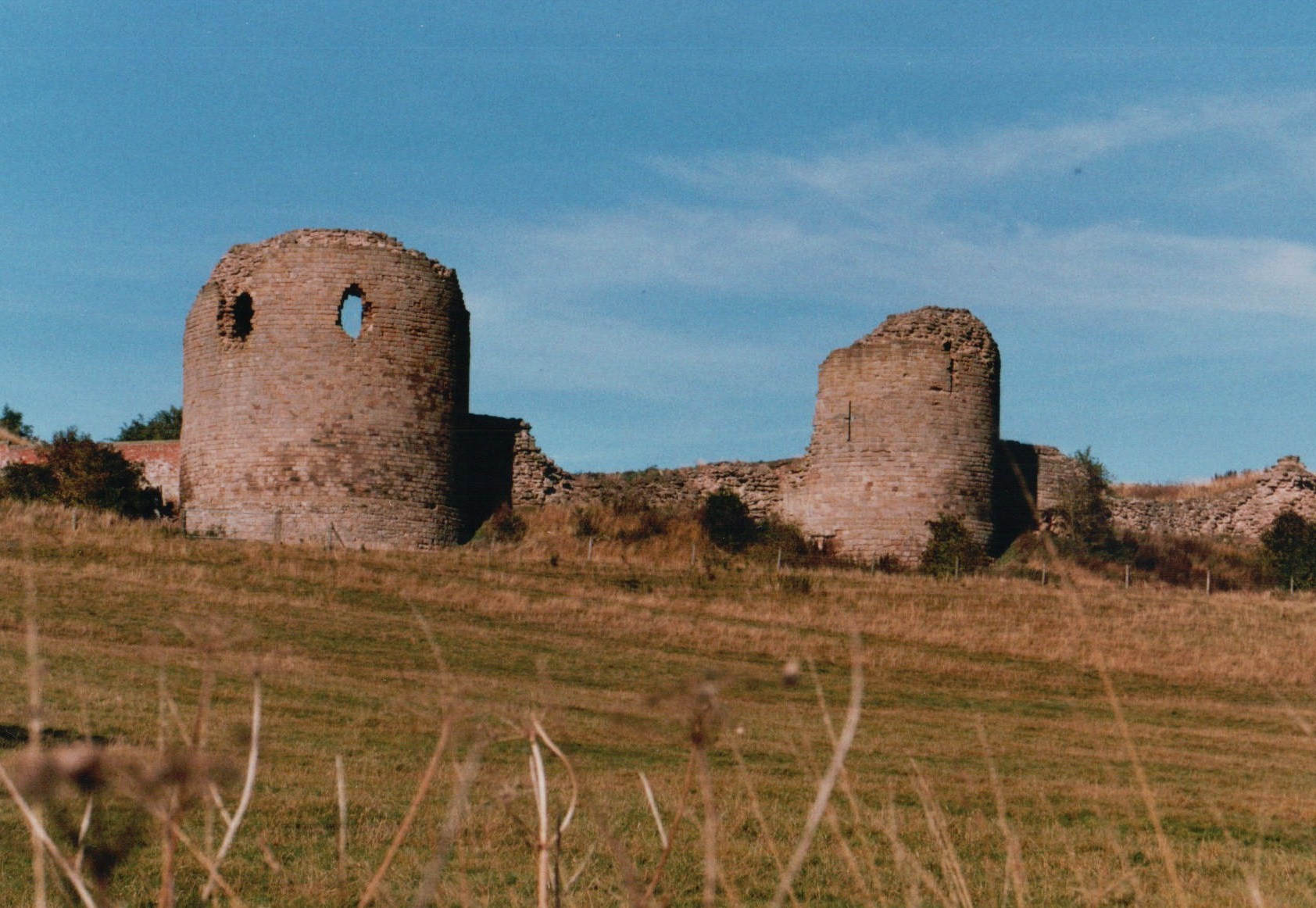
Ruins of Chartley Castle, Staffordshire, where Essex had his seat and political base

At least by the time of his imprisonment, Bromley had been closely associated with Essex, offering to "do him service" in a letter he wrote jointly with his brother-in-law, Sir John Scott. The more collegial political arrangement of the previous two decades had been superseded by intense factional struggle, between Essex and Robert Cecil, with the queen herself increasingly indecisive and remote. It was a struggle to control royal policy between the queen's favourite and her most trusted minister, in which the latter had the major political and institutional advantages, including continuous direct access to Elizabeth and use of the powerful government intelligence network. Essex inherited the following of many individuals and families who had supported Leicester, including the Sidneys and regional Puritan politicians like Bromley. By promoting his image as a Protestant hero and patronising Puritan clergy, as well as taking up the cause of James VI, he hoped to appeal to wide circles of support in London and in Parliament. However, as recent evaluations make clear, Essex also had a strong cultural appeal for men like Bromley: more than a mere playboy, he projected himself as a cultivated nobleman, with a following that was strongly focussed on classical learning and martial honour. In July 1600, Bromley wrote to Henry Cuff, one of the militant, classically educated men in the earl's household, expressing his whole-hearted commitment, in a letter that was intercepted and copied for Cecil:

"My dear Brother, I may not omit this opportunity to urge you to let me hear what is done or what hope there is of doing good for our lord. If nothing be done yet, my hope will be very small that it will be very shortly. It were good in my poor opinion that an end of his expectations were urged. The summer is half done, time is precious, opportunity may be lost; I am and will be as I have promised. I expect but direction, for I am wholly his that you are. Let us not lose the start that we have gotten, but bethink of some means either to be winners or savers. I doubt of the forbearing hand by former experience, for vile natures will ascribe that patience to pusillanimity that the noble would to contempt. For my part I am ready to undergo what he doth, and none that have been most tied to him by benefits are or shall be more tied in affection. Let this suffice, and lose I pray you no time to perform those offices that you have undertaken and I have promised. – From my house at Holt Castle, 29 July."

Bromley was also tied to Essex also through family and regional networks. His brother-in-law John Lyttelton was MP for Worcestershire and allied to his distant relative Edward Littleton, who managed political matters for Essex in neighbouring Staffordshire, which he regarded as his "own country", and had his seat at Chartley Castle. However, Lyttelton was well known to have Catholic sympathies. An important part of the cement holding the Littletons of both counties in the alliance around Essex was a shared antipathy to Edward Sutton, 5th Baron Dudley, a reprobate regional magnate, also of Catholic sympathies, who attempted to disrupt the election of MPs loyal to Essex.

Although Bromley did not take part in the Essex Rebellion of 8 February 1601, he was sent to the Tower of London on 21 February 1601, and examined on 5 May. In June his name appeared on a list of "those that are fined and reserved to her Majesty's use," but significantly without specifying the sum involved. Later in the month he wrote to Cecil from the Tower, complaining that he had made some sort of admission when short of sleep, and hoping "that he may rely on Cecil for satisfying her Majesty of his loyalty, and for his entire liberty in time convenient." A month later, with apparently little progress made, he wrote again, thanking Cecil for accepting his earlier letter, but pointing out he needed to be released if he were to provide further satisfaction – presumably a fine or bribe, the two being not entirely distinguishable – and that "without Cecil's charitable consideration, he, his wife and children will be ruined." On 14 November, still in the Tower, his tone was still more desperate:

"Join with the other lords in intercession to her Majesty for my enlargement. I am ready to redeem her favour with the last drop of my dearest blood. In the meantime I pray God to send you your heart's desire."

On 9 February 1602 he again implored Cecil from the Tower:

"I beseech you to have my miseries in remembrance, and procure my deliverance from this captivity, drawing with it the ruin of my poor wife and children. Be the means of my enlargement with such convenient speed as may give some life to my languishing estate."

By 1 March, however, he had begun to get down to practicalities. Cecil, unlike his father, was notoriously involved in the "scramble for profits" and the Essex rebellion had allowed him to build a machine for extracting them. He needed to be certain he could extract money from Bromley. John Lyttelton had been attainted, condemned to death, reprieved but died in the King's Bench Prison. From his estates, almost ruined by his father, Lyttelton had pledged a portion to guarantee the fines of Bromley, Humphrey Perrott and Charles Danvers. This arrangement was now threatened by a counter-claim for the land from another of Lyttelton's brothers-in-law, Thomas Cornwall. Bromley knew the location of documents disproving Cornwall's claim: they were lodged with Richard Davies, the treasurer of the Inner Temple, and so could be recovered in the next term. This seems to have done the trick. He was fined, deprived of his position as JP and released in May 1602. In June he wrote to Cecil again, anticipating a final resolution of claims against Lyttelton's property. Bromley, apparently innocent of any involvement in the rebellion, was held for much longer than many who were far more active in the Essex faction.

=== Restored to favour ===
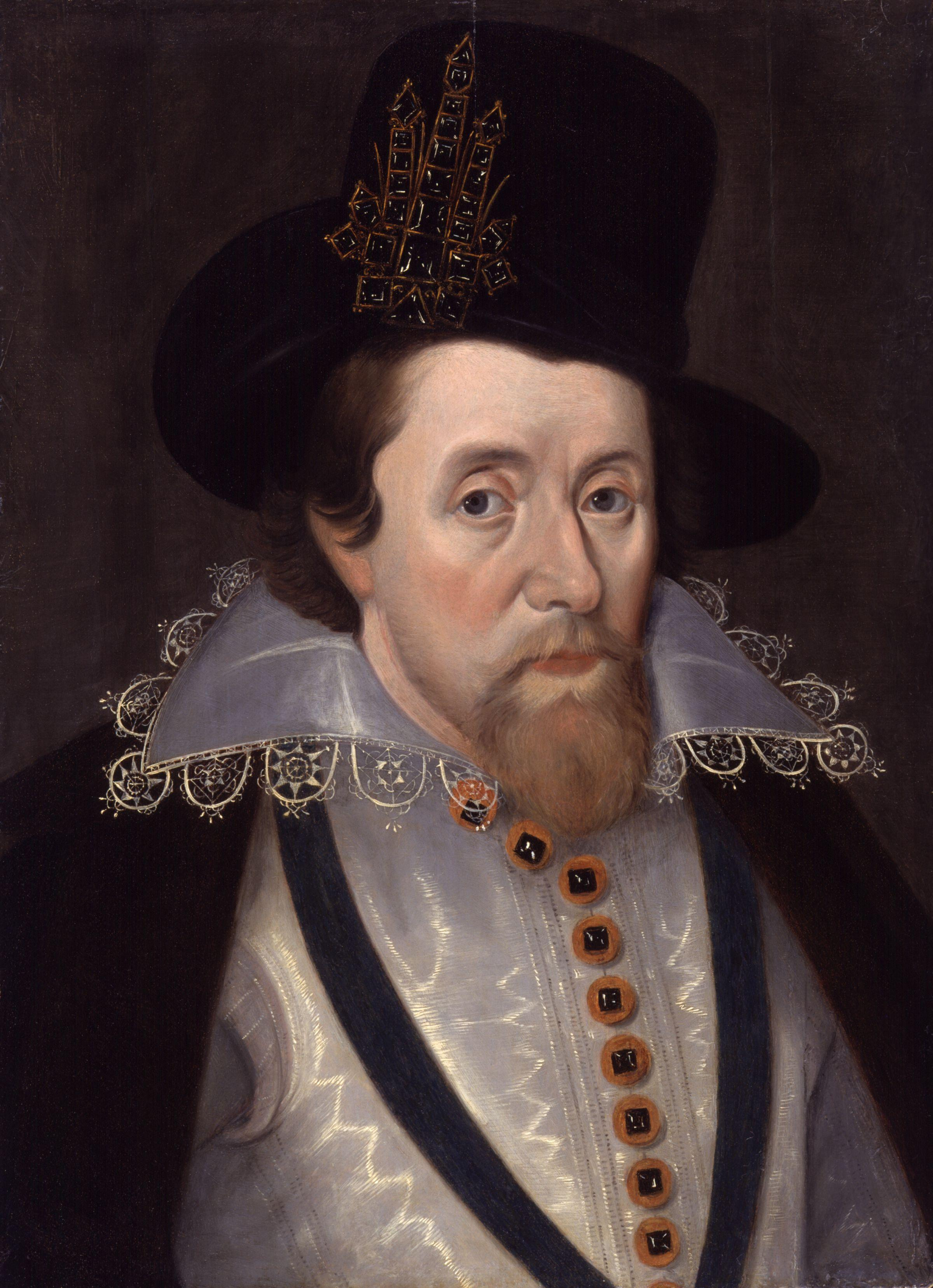
James VI of Scotland and I of England, around 1606.

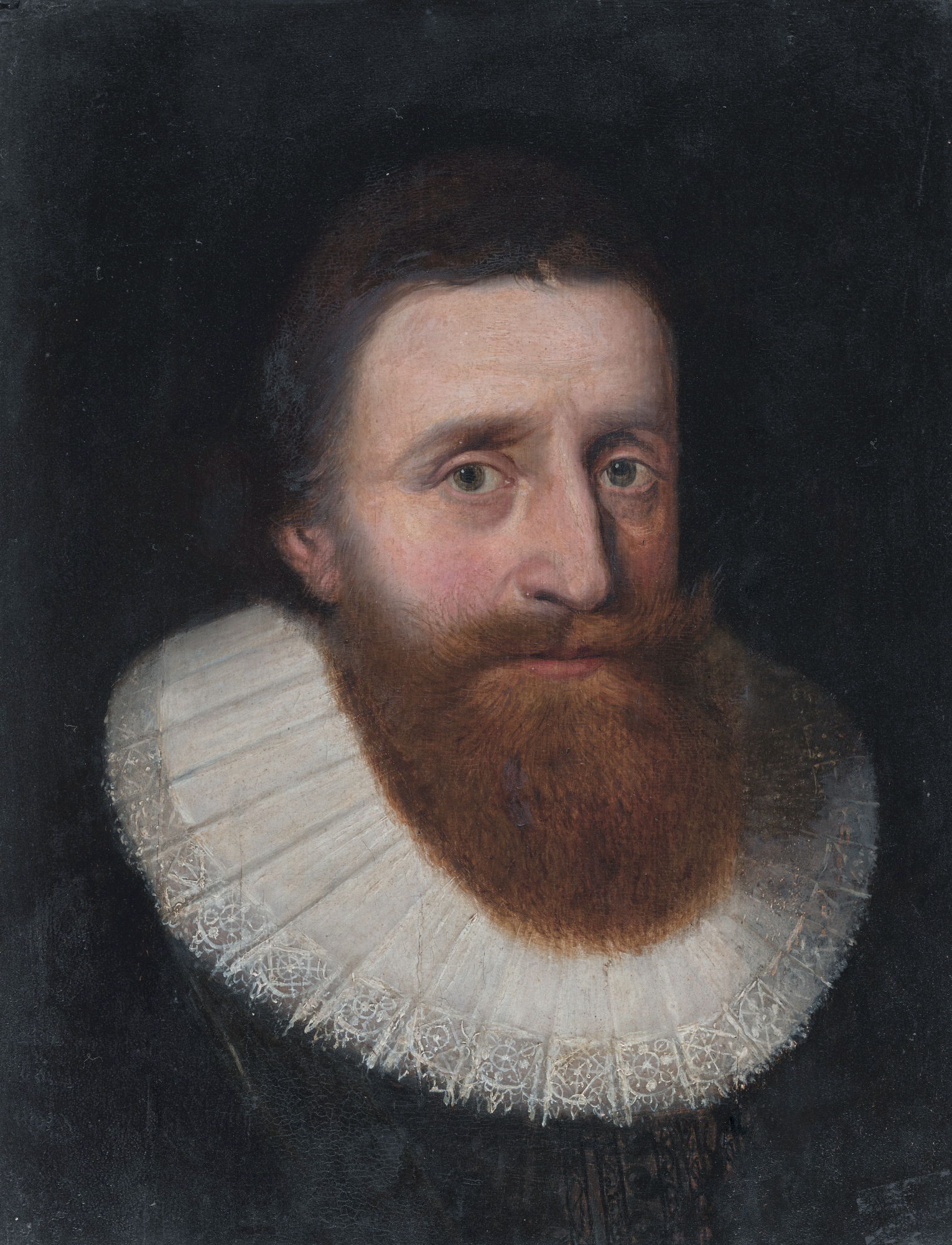
Ludovic Stewart 2nd Duke of Lennox, one of Bromley's Scottish allies at court.

When Queen Elizabeth died in 1603, Bromley was one of the first to go north to greet King James. He was seen as one of group of diverse interests that were very influential with the new king because of their sustained loyalty. The diarist John Manningham reported:

There is a foolishe rime runnes up and downe in the Court of Sir Henry Bromley, Lord Thomas Haward, Lord Cobham, and the Deane of Canterbury, Dr. Nevil, that eache should goe to move the King for what they like.

"Nevil for the Protestant, Lord Thomas for the Papist, Bromley for the Puritan, and Lord Cobham for the Atheist."

Bromley was certainly made a gentleman of the privy chamber and thus a confidant of the king, but there is no evidence that he actually had a concrete program of reform to put before James. His influence, exercise partly through connections with Scottish courtiers, was real but limited; he counted for little against the real holders of power in London and Westminster. Ludovic Stewart, 2nd Duke of Lennox, prevailed on the king to promise Bromley the Receiver Generalship of London, Middlesex, Herefordshire and Essex but the appointment never materialised and the post was given to Michael Hicks, a powerful London merchant and an intimate of Robert Cecil, who kept it for only a few months. A warrant to obtain Crown lands was granted to him in 1604 but almost immediately revoked, and it took the intervention of John Erskine, Earl of Mar, to get the grant restored to Bromley. He had similar problems with Duchy of Lancaster lands: a warrant was issued to grant him parcels of dismembered manors on 19 April 1604 but partially rescinded the very next day. Bromley was out of his depth in dealing with the power-brokers of central government but continued as an effective politician regionally.

=== The 1604 parliament ===
Bromley stood for election in Worcestershire in 1604. This election was unusually and bitterly contested, as Bromley's candidacy was opposed by the recusant John Talbot of Grafton. According to Talbot, his opposition stemmed from Bromley's high-handedness in trying to get Sir William Walsh to stand down in his favour so that he could triumph through Court influence. Talbot gave his backing to two other candidates: Sir Edmund Harewell and Sir John Pakington. However, Bromley had the backing of a large section of the local gentry, including the sheriff, Sir Thomas Russell, and the Lyttelton affinity, now centred on his sister Meriel. He was duly elected, along with Sir William Lygon, a heavily indebted landowner of questionable religious allegiance who died in 1608, and was replaced by Sir Samuel Sandys. The 1604 parliament was to last for seven years and his son Thomas Bromley was elected to its successor in 1614. There was little aristocratic influence now over the county and Bromleys and Lytteltons were to dominate the representation of Worcestershire in the Parliaments of James I and Charles I.

In the first session of the parliament, Bromley was fairly active. Robert Wroth proposed a package of reforms to the House, some apparently sponsored by Cecil, including the vexed issue of wardship. Bromley was appointed to the committee to deal with Wroth's programme, and took part in a conference with the Lords about wardship, although ultimately little came of it. Bromley was part of a committee to consider a proposal from Sir Henry Neville, another former member of the Essex faction, to rethink the treason laws. He also sat on the committees that dealt with restoration of property and titles to Robert Devereux, 3rd Earl of Essex, Henry Wriothesley, 3rd Earl of Southampton, who had been imprisoned for his part in the Essex rebellion, and Thomas Howard, 21st Earl of Arundel, whose father had died in the Tower, a Catholic martyr, in 1595. In June he was appointed to a similar committee to restore property to the children of John Lyttleton: it was chaired by his friend and cousin, Edward Bromley. He also took part in three committees on religion, including consideration of two bills to forbid pluralism, the simultaneous holding of several benefices. Importantly, in April he took part in a conference to ascertain the Lords' proposals on the Union of the two realms.

=== The Gunpowder Plot ===
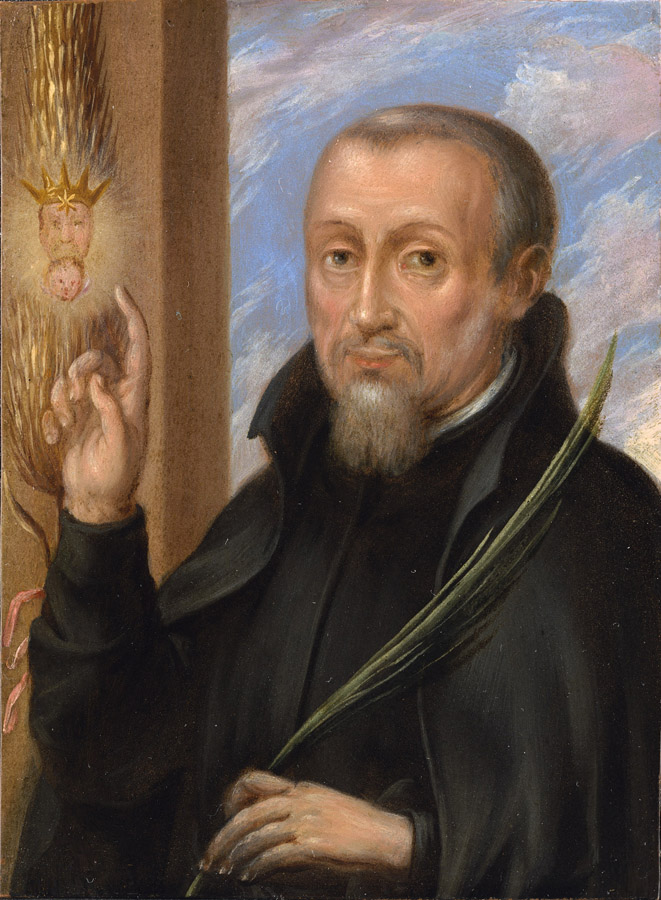
Henry Garnet, another of the Jesuit priests arrested by Bromley in 1606.

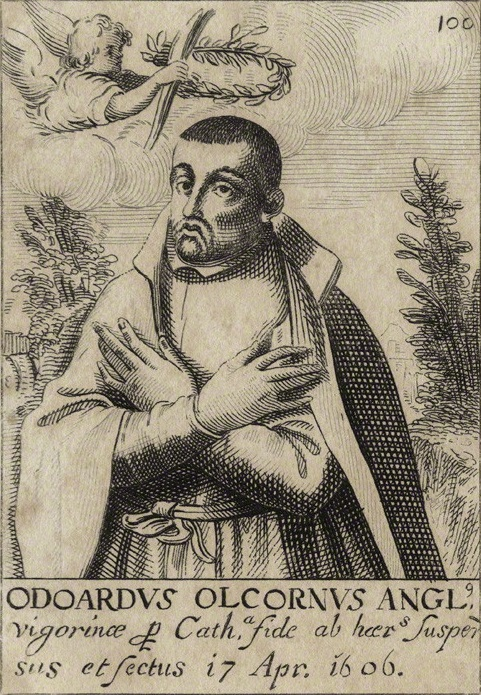
Edward Oldcorn, a Jesuit arrested by Bromley at Hindlip Hall.

Following the discovery of the Gunpowder Plot, the king instructed Bromley to assist local authorities in apprehending conspirators in his home county, a task he undertook with dedication. The Sheriff, Sir Richard Walsh, whose daughter Anne was married to Bromley's son and heir, led the assault on Holbeche House on 8 November 1605. Bromley took charge of those captured and conveyed twenty three of them to London. Some of the plotters were Lytteltons and it seems that Bromley used family connections to find them. In January Bromley's servant, William Bradley, raised a posse to arrest Robert Wintour and Stephen Littleton, the owner of Holbeche, at Hagley Hall, the home of Bromley's sister, Muriel, apparently on a tip-off from her cook, John Finwood.

Around 20 January, Bromley was ordered to search Hindlip Hall for Catholic priests: “to pull down the wainscoat, bore the ground, drill the boards and chimney corners, examine the attics and roof, &c., in search of concealed hiding-places.” He was having great difficulties when two of concealed men, Nicholas Owen and Hall, broke out and were captured. It was another week before Henry Garnet and Edward Oldcorne emerged, and even then the priests were misidentified. He took the prisoners to London, after a suitable delay to allow Garnet to recover his strength: Garnet later reported the kind treatment he had received at Bromley's hands throughout the stay and the journey, although he was on his way to brutal execution.

Bromley was not able to return to parliament until early March, well into the next session. He was initially fairly active and was a member of the committee dealing with the attainder of the Gunpowder plotters. Thereafter, his parliamentary activity steadily lessened.

== Landowner ==
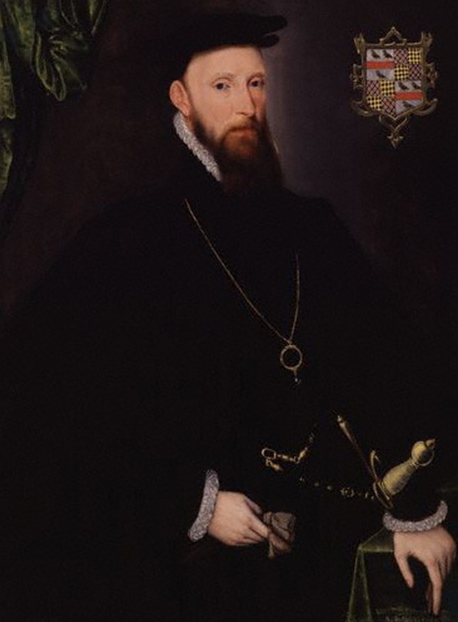
Lord Lumley, a fellow connoisseur and a supporter of Essex, from whom Bromley purchased land.

By 1586 Henry Bromley had purchased the manor of Great Malvern in Worcestershire from John Lumley, 1st Baron Lumley. Some sources aver that the queen granted the manor to Sir Thomas Bromley, Henry's father. However, the Victoria County History makes clear that the reversion had been held by Lumley, who had it confirmed by the queen before applying for permission to sell it. It was a former monastic property, originally belonging to Great Malvern Priory, and since leased out by the Crown. On the death of his father in 1587, Bromley inherited an extensive property in Worcestershire, including his seat at Holt Castle, a crenellated manor house (not to be confused with the medieval fortress of Holt Castle in Wales) and lands in Shropshire and Montgomeryshire.

Initially, Bromley expanded his estates considerably. He completed the purchase of the manor of Holt, which had long been divided and only partly acquired by his father. In 1590 he bought the manor of Powick, near Worcester, a former estate of Pershore Abbey, from the Crown. In 1593 Bromley purchased the manor of Upton, in Worcestershire, from Sir Anthony Bourne, Mary Croft and Sir Herbert Croft. Bourne was a notorious womaniser and miscreant, whose wife, Elizabeth Horne had applied to the Privy Council for a legal separation. Their daughter, Mary, had married Croft. Bourne was always in financial difficulties and Thomas Bromley had bought land from him, including part of Holt.

However, Bromley was a patron of learning and his expenditure on his numerous cultural interests contributed to the indebtedness of his later years, exacerbating the losses he sustained through political miscalculation and the extravagance of his heir. Together they ran up debts of about £5000.

The size of Bromley's fine for his support of Essex was never disclosed but it must have been substantial as he had to get permission to sell land to pay it. He mortgaged his Montgomeryshire property to his second cousin, Francis Newport for £2,800. His fourth wife Anne Beswick, whom he married in 1604 was a wealthy widow and the lands he obtained through his court connections brought him £5000 later that year. Yet in 1606 he had to get the king to write to Newport asking for an extension on his mortgage.

Bromley was forced to take radical measures to reduce his debts. From 1610 he was selling land in Worcestershire. In 1614 he sold the manor of Battenhall, near Worcester, one of the estates bought by his father from Bourne. In 1615, shortly before he died, he was forced to lease part of his Worcestershire property to trustees and to restrict his son Thomas to only a life interest in the lands.

== Death ==
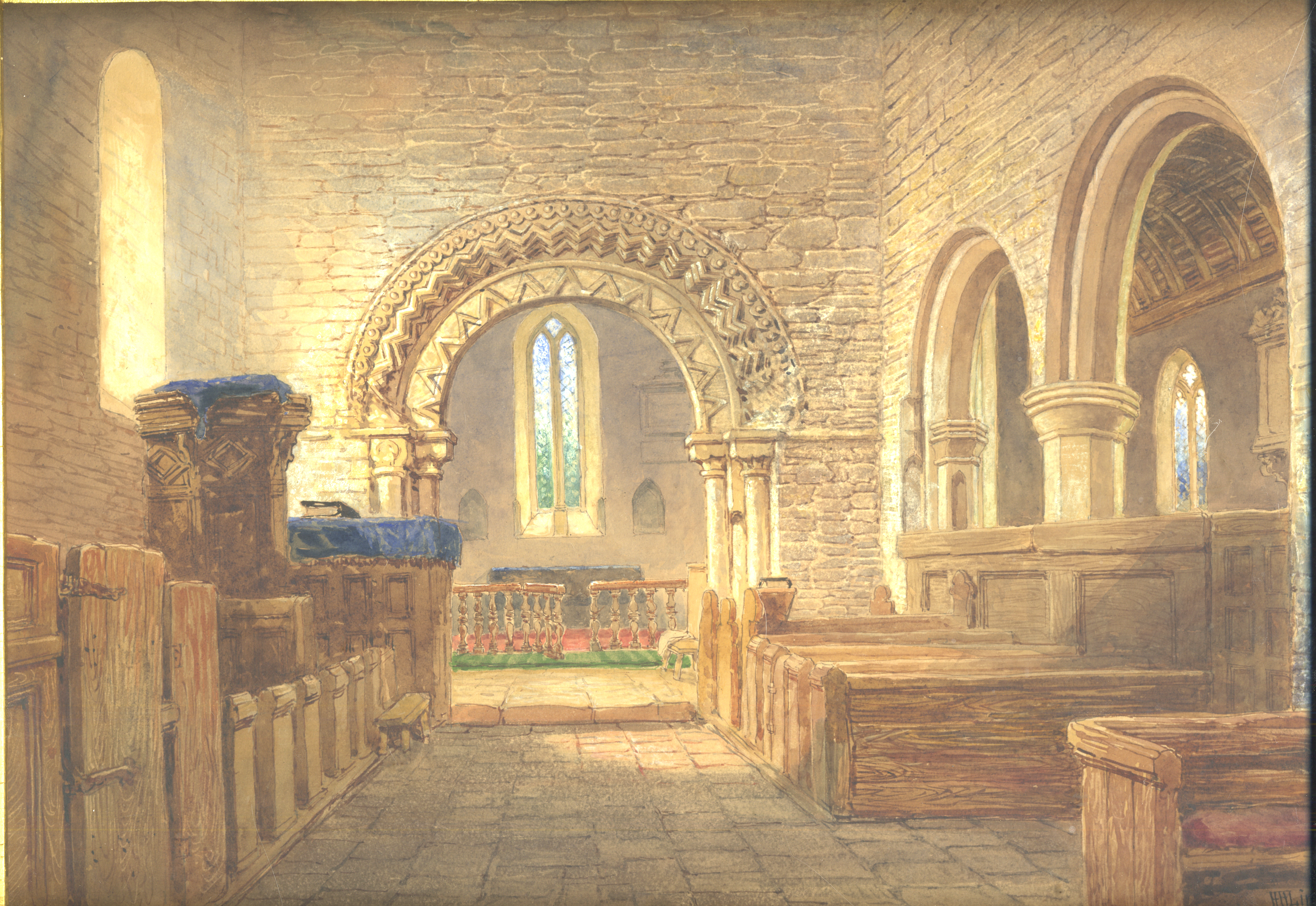
Holt parish church.

Bromley died on 15 May 1615 at the age of 54 at Shrawardine Castle in Shropshire and was buried the following day in Holt parish church. His widow had a monument constructed over his grave.

Contemporaries described Bromley as a supporter of learning, religious in his conduct, sociable, generous in hospitality, and charitable toward the poor.

== Marriages and descendants ==
There is some confusion about the identity of Bromley's wives. He married firstly Elizabeth Pelham, daughter of Sir William Pelham, master of the ordnance. He married secondly Elizabeth Verney, daughter of Hugh Verney of Somerset. His third wife was Anne Scott, daughter of Sir Thomas Scott of Scot's Hall, Kent He married fourthly Anne Beswick, daughter of William Beswick of Cheshire, and alderman of London. Some sources omit Anne Scot and give as fourth wife Anne Appleby, widow of William Appleby, merchant of the staple. He had at least three sons of whom Thomas was later MP for Worcestershire.

=== Family tree ===
Family Tree: The Bromleys and Lytteltons, c.1500–1750

George Bromley of Hodnet, High Sheriff of Shropshire 1521-2	Jane Lacon of Willey, Shropshire	Sir John Lyttelton of Frankley	Bridget Pakington of Hampton Lovett
Thomas Bromley (1530–87), of Rodd Castle and Hodnet, MP for Bridgnorth, Wigan and Guildford, Lord Chancellor	Elizabeth Fortescue of Shirburn, Oxfordshire	Elizabeth Coningsby of Hampton Court, Herefordshire	Gilbert Lyttelton (c.1540–1599) of Frankley and Prestwood, MP for Worcestershire	George Lyttelton of Holbeche House (died c.1603), MP for Droitwich	Margaret Smyth of Shelford
Richard Corbet (died 1601) of Adderley and Stoke upon Tern	Anne Bromley	Sir Oliver Cromwell (died 1655) of Hinchingbrooke House and Ramsey Abbey, MP for Huntingdonshire	Elizabeth Bromley	Muriel or Meriel Bromley	John Lyttelton (1561–1601), MP for Worcestershire	Anne Lyttelton	Thomas Cornwall of Burford, Shropshire
Elizabeth Pelham	Sir Henry Bromley (c.1560–1615), of Holt Castle and Shrawardine Castle, MP for Plymouth, Worcestershire and Shropshire	Anne Scott	Joan or Jane Bromley	Edward Greville (1566–1634) of Milcote, MP for Warwickshire	Stephen Littleton of Holbeche House (executed 1606), Gunpowder Plotter	Humphrey Littleton (executed 1606), Gunpowder Plotter
Anne Walsh of Shelsley Walsh	Sir Thomas Bromley (c.1585–1641) of Holt Castle, MP for Worcestershire	Henry Bromley of Upton-upon-Severn	Mary Lygon of Madresfield	Sir Thomas Lyttelton, 1st Baronet (1595–1650), MP for Worcestershire and Leominster	Katherine Crompton of Driffield
Henry Bromley of Holt (died 1652)	Beatrice Newport, daughter of Richard Newport, 1st Baron Newport	Henry Bromley of Upton (died 1667)	Dorothy Godbold	Sir Henry Lyttelton, 2nd Baronet (c.1624–93), MP for Lichfield	Sir Charles Lyttelton, 3rd Baronet (c.1629–1716), MP for Bewdley	Anne Temple
Henry Bromley of Holt (1632–70), MP for Worcestershire	Mercy Pytts daughter of Edward Pytts of Kyre Park	Henry Bromley of Upton	Elizabeth Lench of Doverdale	Christian Temple, daughter of Sir Richard Temple, 3rd Baronet	Sir Thomas Lyttelton, 4th Baronet (1686–1751), MP for Worcestershire and Camelford
Margaret Berkeley, daughter of Sir Rowland Berkeley of Cotheridge	William Bromley (1656–1707) of Holt, MP for Worcester and Worcestershire	Judith Hanbury	William Bromley of Upton (1685–1756), MP for Tewkesbury	Lucy Fortescue	George Lyttelton, 1st Baron Lyttelton (1709–73), MP for Okehampton	Elizabeth Rich

== Footnotes ==
Parliament of England
Preceded by John Hawkins; Edmund Tremayne	Member of Parliament for Plymouth; 1584–1588; With: Christopher Harris 1584–1586; Hugh Vaughan 1586–1588	Succeeded by Miles Sandys; Reginald Nicholas
Preceded by Sir John Russell; William Lygon	Member of Parliament for Worcestershire; 1593; With: William Walsh	Succeeded by John Lyttelton; Edward Colles
Preceded by Francis Newport; Sir Robert Needham	Member of Parliament for Shropshire; 1597; With: Thomas Leighton	Succeeded by John Egerton; Roger Owen
Preceded by Thomas Leighton; Thomas Russell	Member of Parliament for Worcestershire; 1604–1611; With: Sir William Lygon 1604–1609; Sir Samuel Sandys 1609–1611	Succeeded by Sir Thomas Lyttelton; Sir Samuel Sandys
