= Thomas Bromley =

16th-century English lawyer and politician

The Right Honourable Sir Thomas Bromley
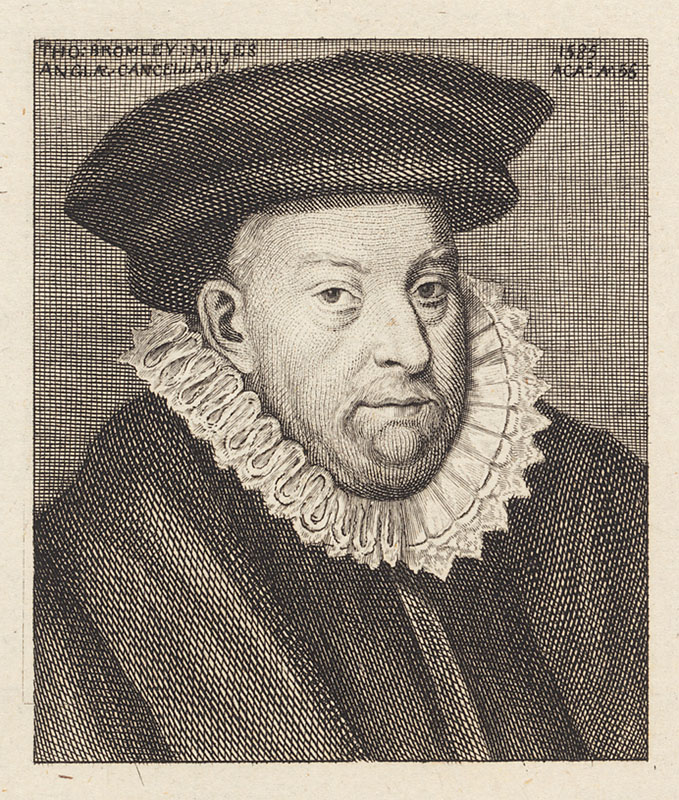

Lord High Chancellor of England
- In office c. 1579 – c. 1587
- Preceded by: Sir Nicholas Bacon (as Lord Keeper of the Great Seal)
- Succeeded by: Sir Christopher Hatton

Solicitor General
- In office c. 1569 – c. 1579
- Preceded by: Richard Onslow
- Succeeded by: John Popham

Personal details
- Born: 1530
- Died: 11 April 1587 (aged 57)
- Resting place: Westminster Abbey, London
- Spouse: Elizabeth Fortescue
- Education: University of Oxford

Sir Thomas Bromley (1530 – 11 April 1587) was a 16th-century lawyer, judge and politician who established himself in the mid-Tudor period and rose to prominence during the reign of Elizabeth I. He was successively Solicitor General and Lord Chancellor of England. He presided over the trial of Mary, Queen of Scots and died three months after her execution.

== Background ==
Thomas Bromley was born around 1530. He was the second son of

- George Bromley of Hodnet, close to Market Drayton in Shropshire, the son of William Bromley of Mitley and Beatrix Hill.
- Jane Lacon, daughter of Sir Thomas Lacon of Willey, Shropshire.

The Bromleys originated in Staffordshire, but had acquired estates in neighbouring counties. They were of the middling landed gentry, like their allies and neighbours the Hills: the two families were to prosper together by seeking new sources of income, the Hills from commerce and the Bromleys through the law. George Bromley was a prominent member of the Inner Temple, serving as Autumn Reader for 1508 and Lent Reader for 1509, although he refused the honour for Lent 1515. Another Thomas Bromley, George's younger cousin, was made Chief Justice of the King's Bench by Mary I. The young Thomas Bromley also had an elder brother, another George Bromley, the heir to the family estates, who was himself to become a notable lawyer and politician.

=== Family tree: the Bromley dynasty ===
The family tree illustrates Thomas Bromley's relationship to the rest of the Bromley dynasty and to their main allies, the Hill, Corbet and Newport families.

Family Tree: the Bromleys and their allies, c. 1450–1650

Based primarily on the Heraldic Visitations of Shropshire and Cheshire, with assistance from the History of Parliament Online.

David Browe of Malpas, Cheshire	Jane Mitley	Roger Bromley of Mitley
Humphrey Hill of Blore and Buntingsdale	Agnes, daughter and coheiress of John Bird of Charlton, Shropshire, granddaughter and heiress of David of Malpas	Unknown, daughter and coheiress of David Browe	Roger Bromley of Mitley
Thomas Hill	Margaret Wilbraham of Woodhey, near Faddiley, Cheshire	Beatrix Hill	William Bromley of Mitley	Roger Bromley	Jane Jennings of Walliborne Hall, Church Pulverbatch
Sir Rowland Hill (died 1561), of London and Hodnet, Lord Mayor of London	Joanna Hill	John Gratewood	George Bromley of Hodnet, High Sheriff of Shropshire 1521-2	Jane Lacon of Willey, Shropshire	William Bromley	Elizabeth Dodd of Cloverley, near Calverhall, Shropshire	Thomas Bromley (chief justice) (died 1555) of Eyton on Severn, Wroxeter and Shrewsbury, Chief Justice of the Queen's Bench	Isabel Lyster of Rowton, Shropshire
Reginald Corbet (died 1566) of Adderley and Stoke upon Tern, MP for Much Wenlock and Shrewsbury, Justice of the King's Bench	Alice Gratewood, co-heiress of Sir Rowland Hill	THOMAS BROMLEY (1530–87), of Rodd Castle and Hodnet, MP for Bridgnorth, Wigan and Guildford, Lord Chancellor	Elizabeth Fortescue of Shirburn, Oxfordshire	Sir George Bromley (c. 1526-89), of Hallon in Worfield, MP for Much Wenlock, Liskeard and Shropshire	Joanne Waverton of Worfield	Margaret Bromley	Sir Richard Newport (died 1570) of High Ercall, MP for Shropshire
Richard Corbet	Anne Bromley	Elizabeth Bromley	Sir Oliver Cromwell (died 1655) of Hinchingbrooke House and Ramsey Abbey, MP for Huntingdonshire	Sir Henry Bromley (c. 1560-1615), of Holt Castle and Shrawardine Castle, MP for Plymouth, Worcestershire and Shropshire	Elizabeth Pelham	Francis Bromley (c. 1556-91), of Hodnet, MP for Shropshire	Sir Edward Bromley (1563–1626), of Shifnall Grange and Bridgnorth, Baron of the Exchequer, MP for Bridgnorth	Francis Newport (died 1623), MP for Shropshire
Sir John Corbet, 1st Baronet, of Stoke upon Tern, MP for Shropshire, prominent Presbyterian and Parliamentarian	Thomas Bromley (died 1641), MP for Worcestershire	Richard Newport, 1st Baron Newport, MP for Shropshire, prominent Royalist

== Legal education and academic career ==
Both Thomas Bromley and his elder brother, George, were trained in law and called to the bar at the Inner Temple. By 1555, Thomas had gained some trust and prestige at his Inn of Court and was appointed as one of the auditors of the steward. In that year his namesake, the chief justice, died, bequeathing the young Thomas an allowance of 40 shillings a year for ten years, on condition he continue his legal studies. This he clearly did, as he received the degree of Bachelor of Civil Law from Oxford University in 1560 He also rose at his Inn: by February 1563 he was a member of the parliament of the Inner Temple, like his brother George. In 1565 he was appointed attendant on the Reader for the first time, accompanying Richard Onslow, a contemporary from Shropshire who often officiated with him.

Bromley is variously stated to have been Reader at the Inner temple in 1566 for Lent, and autumn although the Inn's records only mention his selection as attendant on the Lent Reader, Francis Gawdy. ODNB states that he served in the autumn and lectured on the Statutes of Attaints. He is listed as a double reader, along with his brother George, in a state paper, probably from about 1579. In 1567 the parliament of the Inn had to rectify a number of anomalies relating to chambers held by Onslow, Bromley and Gawdy, making clear that Bromley had been admitting trainee lawyers of his own for some years, even before he became a bencher. On 25 October 1573 Bromley was chosen to be Lent Reader for the following year but the honour was deferred until 1575 because of the pressure of parliamentary business, with Edmund Anderson standing in for him.

A week later Bromley was elected Treasurer of the Inner Temple, with power to choose his own assistants. He seems to have taken his post very seriously, and apparently found the Inn's finances in crisis. On 19 November a levy was imposed on all members clear immediate debts, graded according to status, with Bromley and his fellow-benchers paying 13s. 4d. While junior barristers paid 6s. 8d. It was not enough, and in January 1574 the parliament noted that

the House at this present is greatly indebted and far behindhand, by reason whereof it is the worse served both of bread, drink, meat, and divers other things, for that the creditors are not in any reasonable and convenient time paid such sums of money as are due unto them for their wares.

A butler was deputed to persecute members for their outstanding fees, on pain of physical exclusion from the premises, and a few months later, pleading inflation of food prices, the members were made chargeable for their actual consumption. Bromley continued in office the following year, listed as appearing at the parliament as treasurer. Financial reform continued, with the cook made chargeable for future losses of pewter dishes – a major expense in the past. Bromley's appointment for a third term was noted in November 1575.

Colleagues and patrons

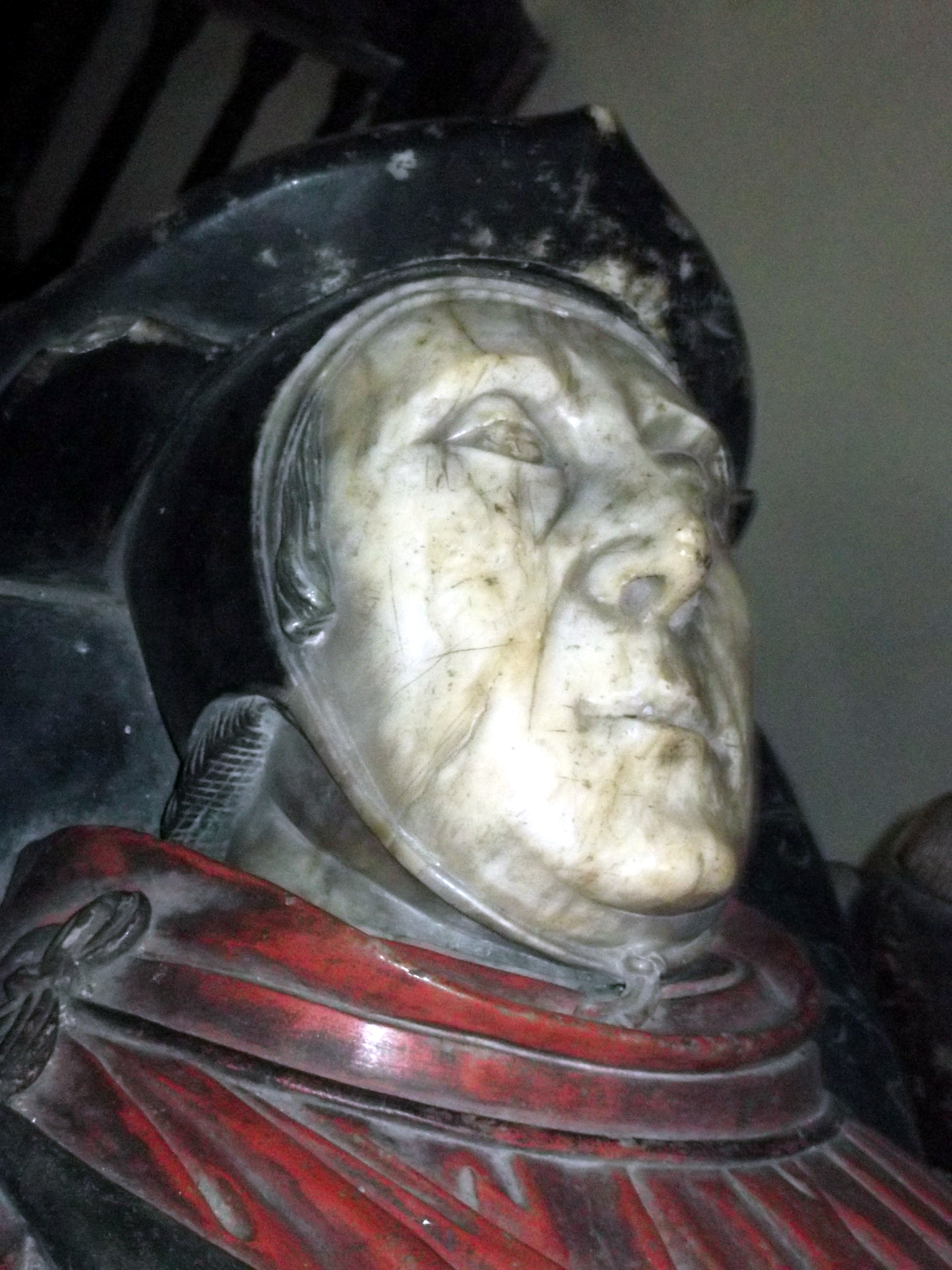
Effigy of Thomas Bromley, the chief justice, who left a small but useful annuity to support young Bromley's studies.

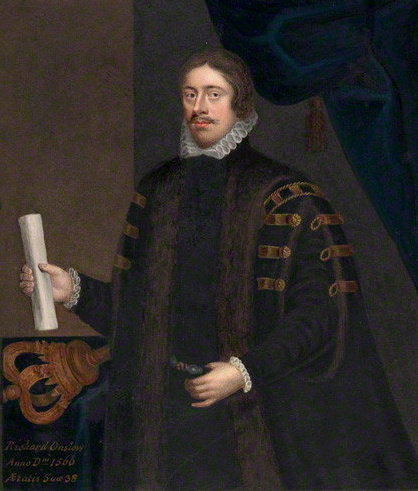
Portrait, claimed to be of Richard Onslow, a noted Puritan lawyer and Bromley's predecessor as recorder of London.

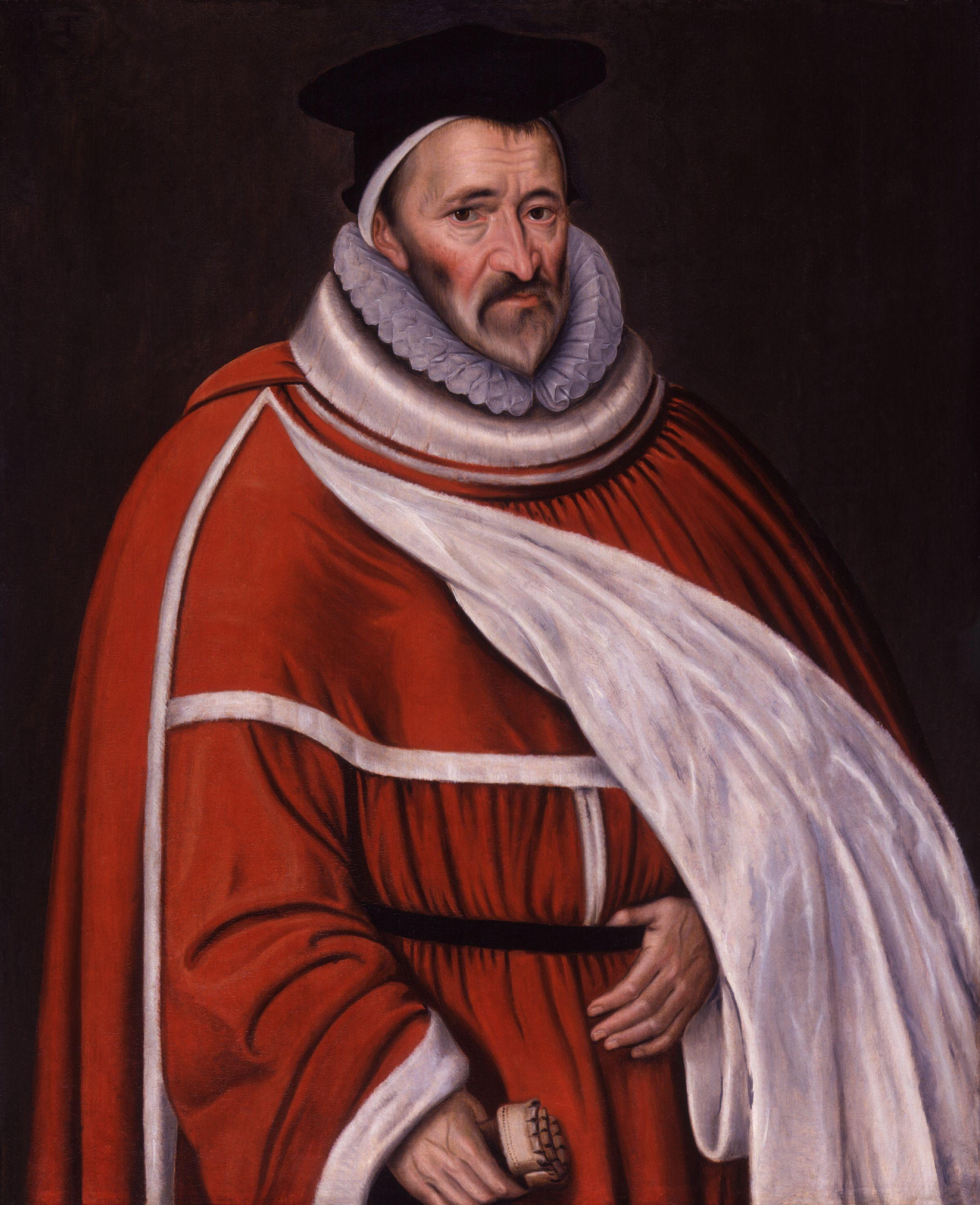
Sir Edmund Anderson, who stood in for Bromley during his final illness, as well as in Inner Temple matters.

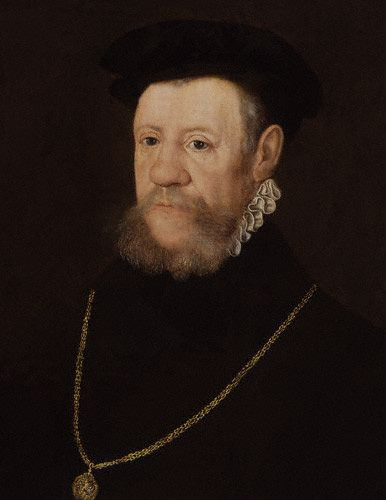
The Earl of Arundel, a sponsor of Bromley's parliamentary career.

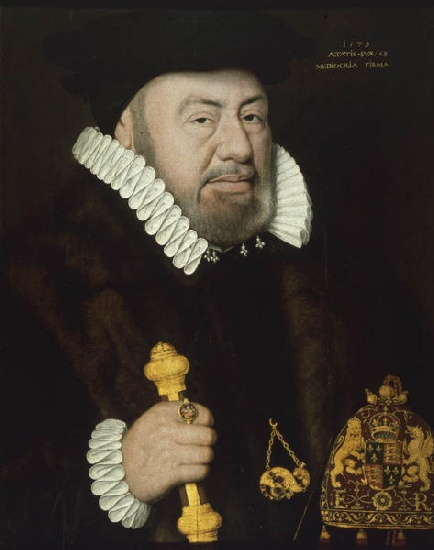
Sir Nicholas Bacon, long a friend and patron of Bromley and his predecessor as Lord Chancellor.

== Member of Parliament ==
Bromley sat as a member of the Parliament of England three times, all fairly early in his career, before he achieved major promotion as a judge.

In 1558 Bromley was MP for the Shropshire borough of Bridgnorth in the last parliament of Mary's reign. At this point he had not completed his education, although he was about 28 years old and a recognised lawyer. He probably owed his election mainly to family connections. His mother's family had numerous links in the Bridgnorth area. The High Sheriff of Shropshire had a considerable say in elections, and in that year was Richard Newport, son-in-law of the chief justice Thomas Bromley and another Inner Templar. The town's elector's, a council of 14 aldermen and bailiffs, had a predilection for lawyers. Their other choice was John Broke, a young Middle Templar and the son of the Shropshire jurist Robert Broke. However, the election seems to have been delayed, perhaps for want of nominations, until 18 January, only two days before the opening of parliament.

In 1559 Bromley was returned to parliament by Wigan. This was dominated by the Duchy of Lancaster and the Earl of Derby. Although it is not known precisely how Bromley obtained the seat, the duchy too had a preference for lawyers. It generally secured the return of a member of the Gerard family, another gentry-lawyer dynasty, and Bromley's colleague on this occasion was William Gerard.

It is much clearer how Bromley came to be MP for Guildford in the parliament which assembled in January 1563. The seat was in the gift of Henry FitzAlan, 19th Earl of Arundel, a Shropshire landowner and the high steward of the borough, who was a friend and patron of Bromley. Bromley was to serve as one of the executors of Arundel's will. In 1566, when he was appointed Recorder of London, he became an MP for the City ex officio, as the aldermen always chose the recorder and one of their own number as MPs. Richard Onslow had been recorder since 1563, succeeding Ralph Cholmley, who had died in office. Thus Bromley was now put forward as MP by two constituencies. However, parliament resolved the contradiction by deciding he should continue to represent Guildford. The London aldermen were forced to hold a by-election and chose Sir John White, a successful merchant in the trade with Spain. Bromley served in 1566 on a committee concerned with legal issues and another on the succession to the throne.

== Legal and judicial career ==
=== Legal practice ===
Through family influence as well as the patronage of Sir Nicholas Bacon, the lord keeper, he quickly made progress in his profession. Alongside public appointments, Bromley built up a substantial practice in both the Queen's Bench, the senior common law court, and Chancery, the principal court of equity. He was patronised and befriended by major political and judicial figures, like Arundel, Henry Carey, 1st Baron Hunsdon, the queen's cousin, Sir William Cordell, the Master of the Rolls, Francis Drake and Francis Russell, 2nd Earl of Bedford, and even the great Lord Burleigh himself.

In 1560 Bromley counselled Catherine, dowager duchess of Suffolk and her husband Richard Bertie. They were prominent Marian exiles who had entrusted much of their property to a lawyer, Walter Herenden of Gray's Inn, with the unwritten proviso that he return it when the persecution was over. Herenden, however, refused, bringing about a cause célèbre which is still considered of importance in developing English trust law and the law concerning refugees' property. Bertie, acting also on behalf of his wife, sued Herenden for breach of trust. While common law viewed the estates as clearly transferred to Herenden in fee simple, Nicholas Bacon and the Court of Chancery decreed otherwise, cancelling the lease and ordering Herenden to hand over the property. However, Bertie still had to get an act passed by parliament in 1563 to get the lands actually restored to him and his wife. It was generally believed that Bromley only took on cases when he was personally convinced of their justice, and this may account for his remarkable record of never losing in five years.

Clients and friends

Sir William Cordell

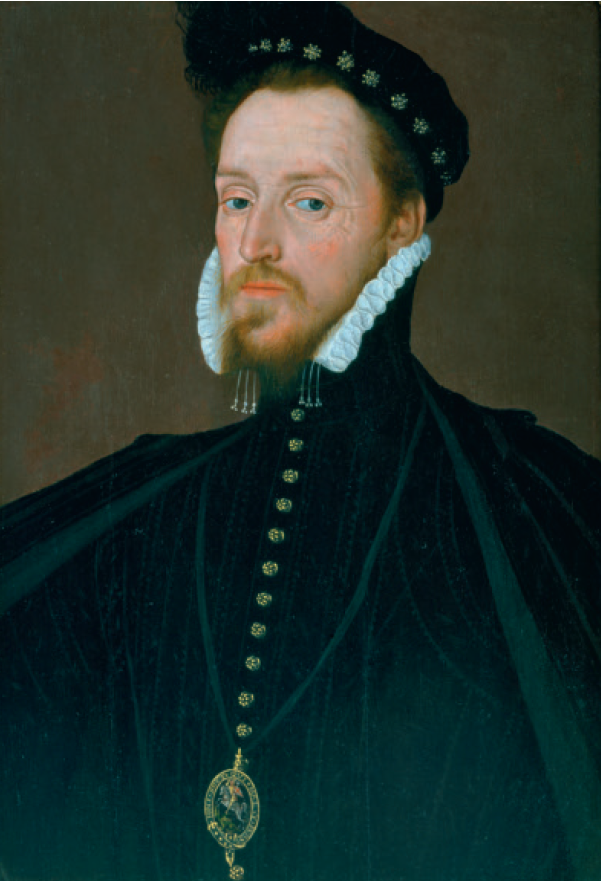
Henry Carey, 1st Baron Hunsdon

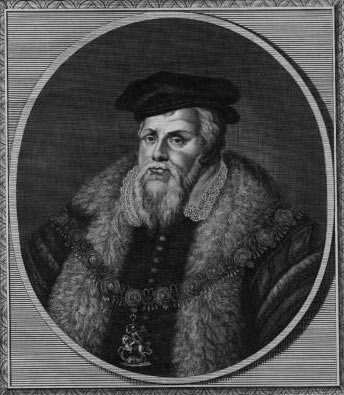
Francis Russell, 2nd Earl of Bedford

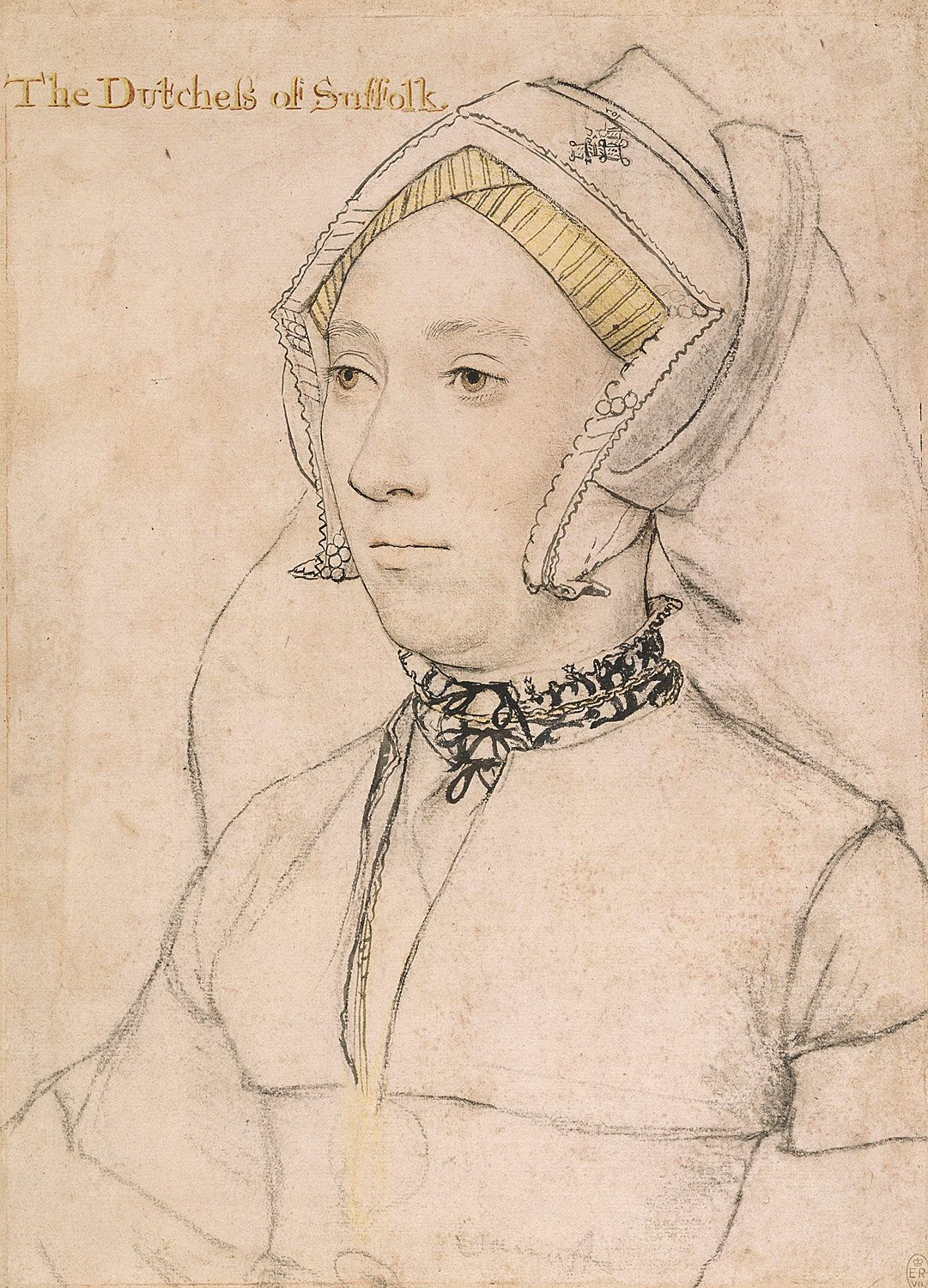
Catherine, dowager Duchess of Suffolk

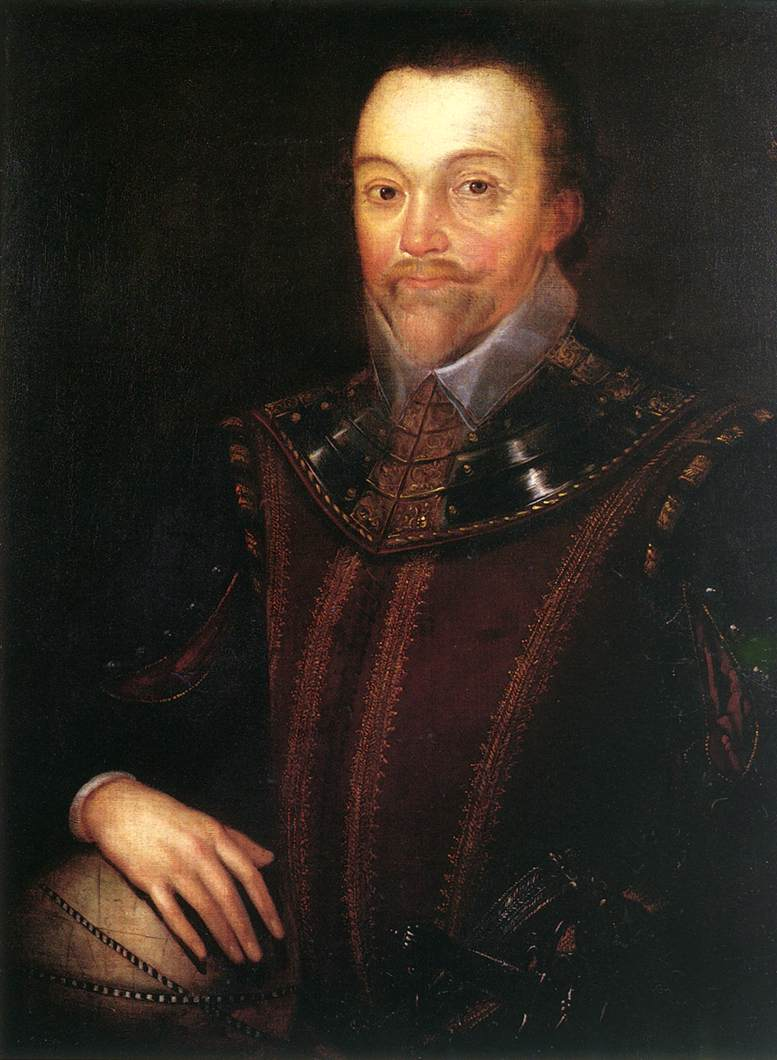
Sir Francis Drake

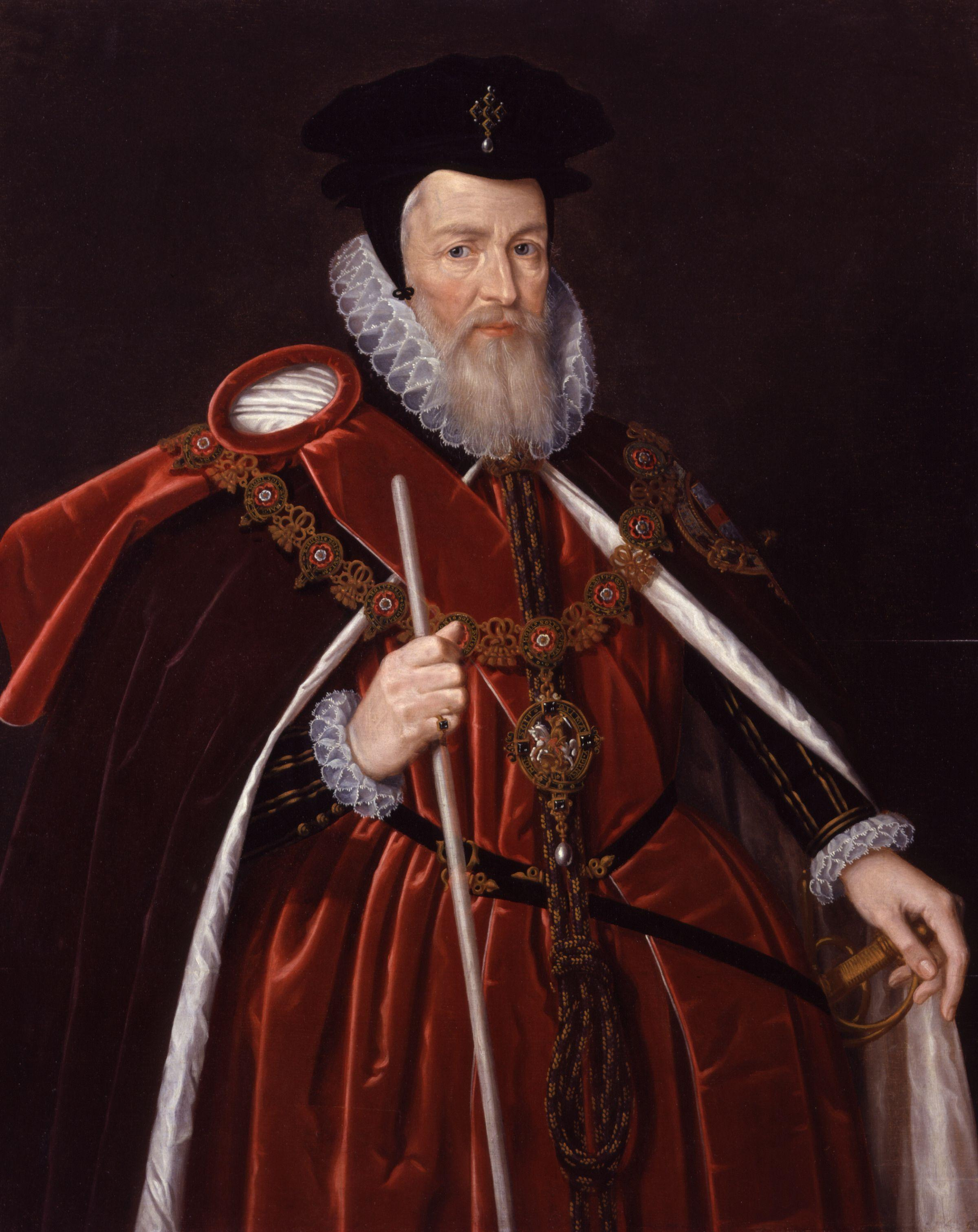
William Cecil, 1st Baron Burghley

=== Recorder of London ===
In 1566 Bromley was appointed recorder of the City of London in succession to Richard Onslow, who had become Solicitor General. This was a post occupied for a considerable period of the Mid-Tudor period by Shropshire lawyers: Robert Broke had held it for nine years. Broke and Onslow, like other London recorders, had represented the city as MPs, but Parliament ordered Bromley to continue as MP for Guilford, as noted above.

=== Solicitor General ===
On 14 March 1569 Bromley was appointed Solicitor General, again succeeding Onslow. The following year he was sent north to take part in the trials following the Revolt of the Northern Earls, which had been suppressed largely through the efforts of Hunsdon. He was greatly embarrassed by an accusation that he had helped Richard Dacres, an attainted rebel who was a distant relative.

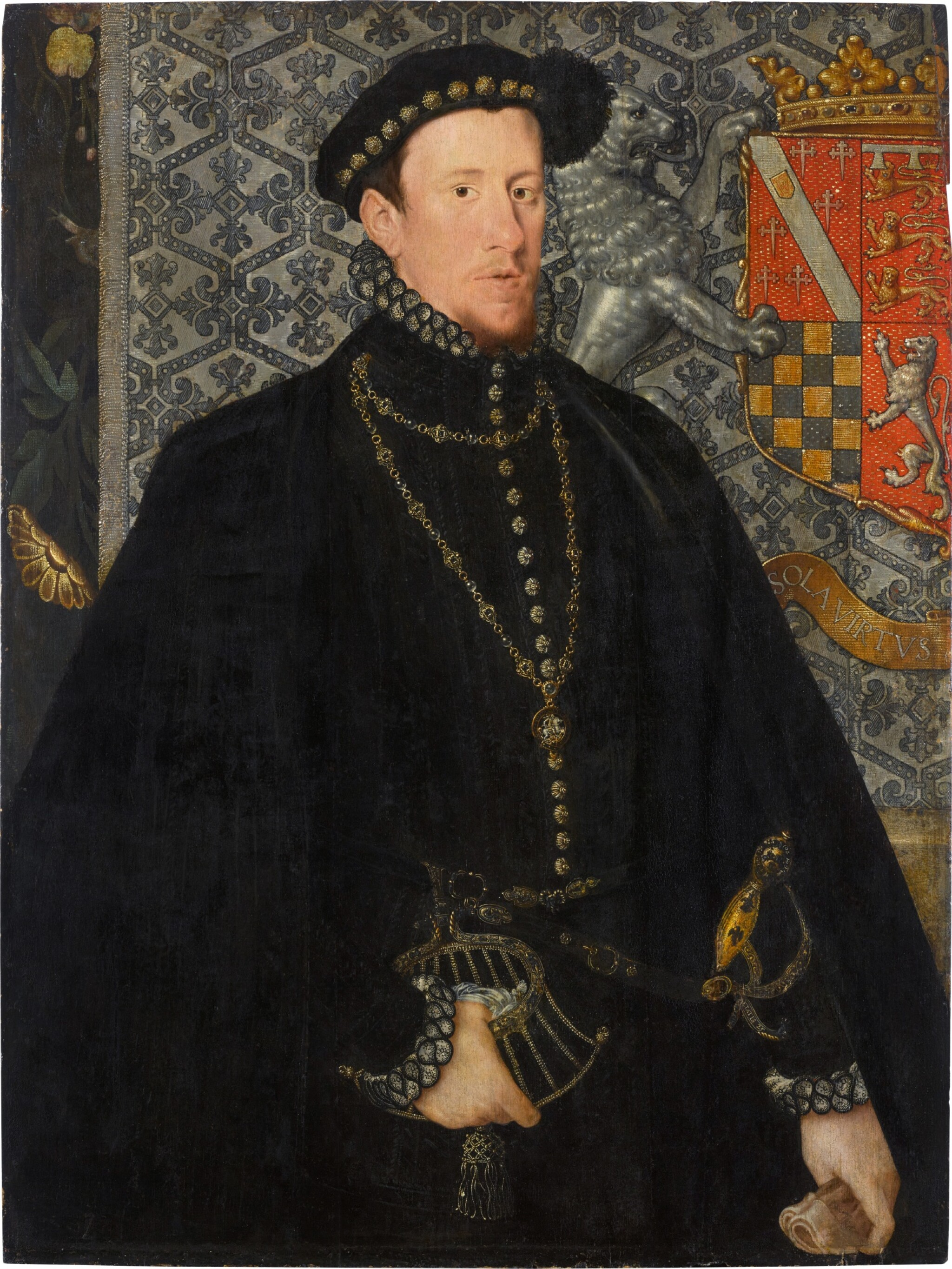
Thomas Howard, 4th Duke of Norfolk. Bromley played an important part in his trial.

However, Bromley played a notable part in 1571 trial of Thomas Howard, 4th Duke of Norfolk, suspected of collusion with the Northern Earls and of involvement in the Ridolfi plot. Bromley spoke after Nicholas Barham, the Queen's Serjeant, who led the prosecution, and Gilbert Gerard, the Attorney General. He was apparently very zealous to secure a conviction. After evidence had been given about the proposed marriage between Norfolk and Mary, Queen of Scots, Bromley's focus was on the communications between Ridolfi and Norfolk. His only evidence of Norfolk's involvement in a plot to invade England and remove the queen was an alleged deciphered copy of a letter given to one Barker to deliver to the Duke. As Norfolk himself argued, there was no evidence that he had ever received the letter, much less that he approved its contents. Bromley was forced to resort to hearsay evidence: that a foreign ambassador in Flanders had heard about the plot and one of his servants had mentioned it to an unnamed English government minister. None of the links in this chain of intelligence gathering was available to give evidence or face questioning but Bromley's allegations were accepted as having explicit royal warrant.

The following year Bromley was one of those sent to Sheffield to lay charges before Mary, Queen of Scots, with the aim of getting her to renounce her claim on both the English and Scottish thrones and to transfer her rights to her son, James. Bromley rehearsed the history of the recent plots and her alleged part in them, but to no avail. In 1574 he was one of the arbitrators appointed to resolve a dispute between the city of Oxford and the university.

On 26 April 1579 Bromley was appointed Lord Chancellor, although he had been made a Privy Counsellor as early as 11 March.

== Lord Chancellor ==
=== Appointment ===
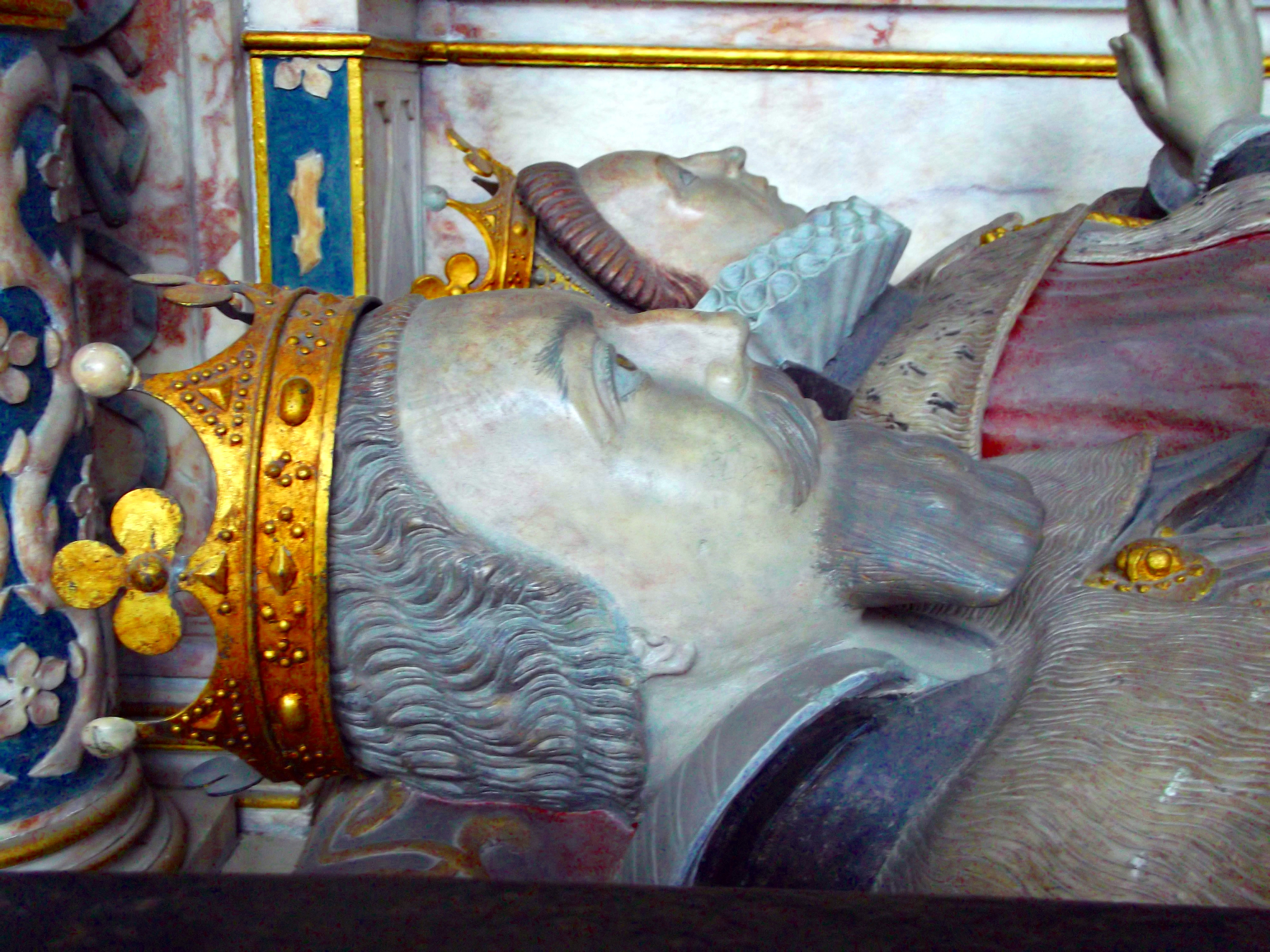
Effigies of Robert Dudley, 1st Earl of Leicester and his wife, Lettice Knollys on their tomb in Warwick. Dudley was the main sponsor of Bromley's candidature for the post of Lord Chancellor.

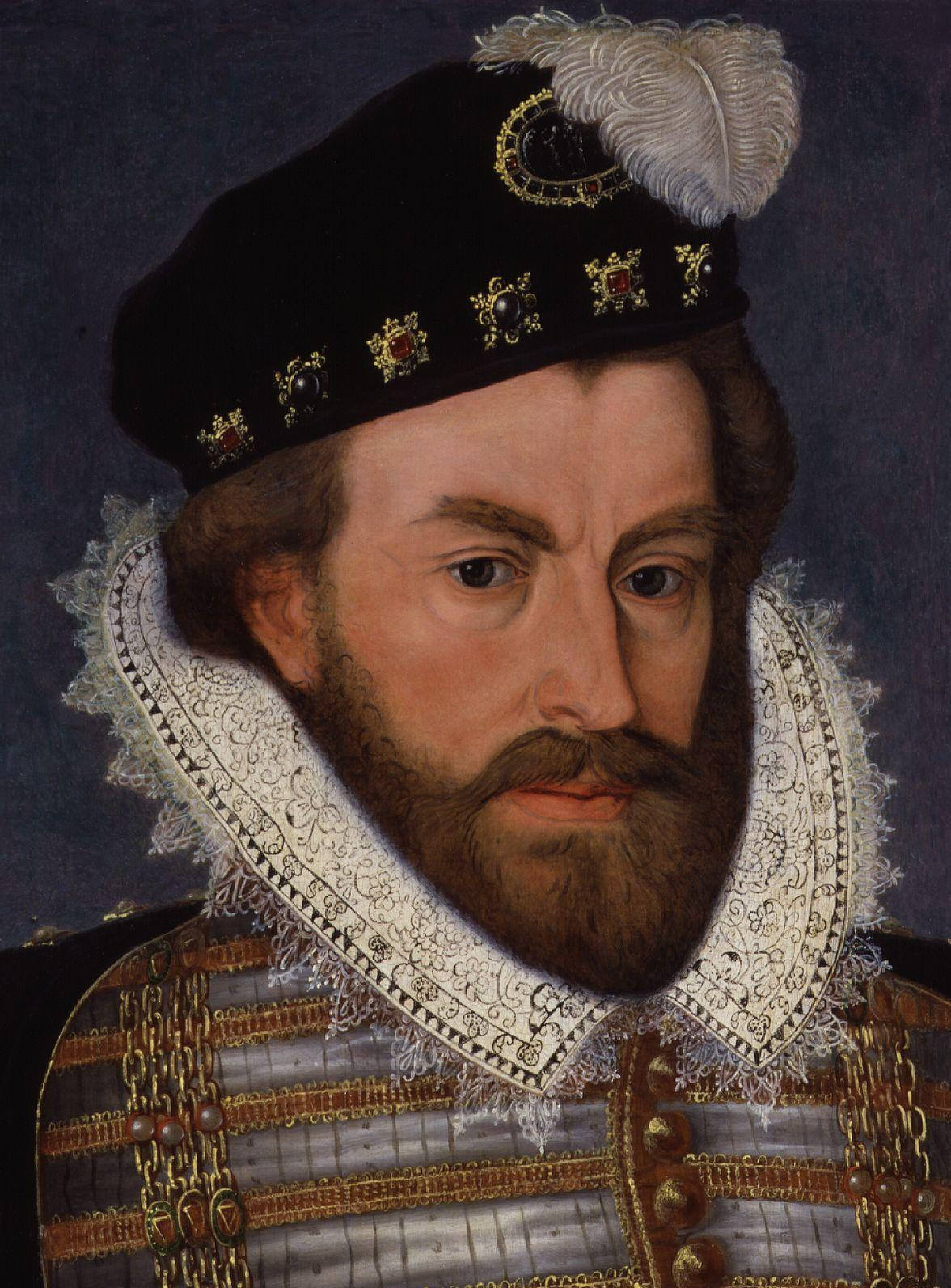
Sir Christopher Hatton, Bromley's sponsor for the Chancellorship and his successor in the post.

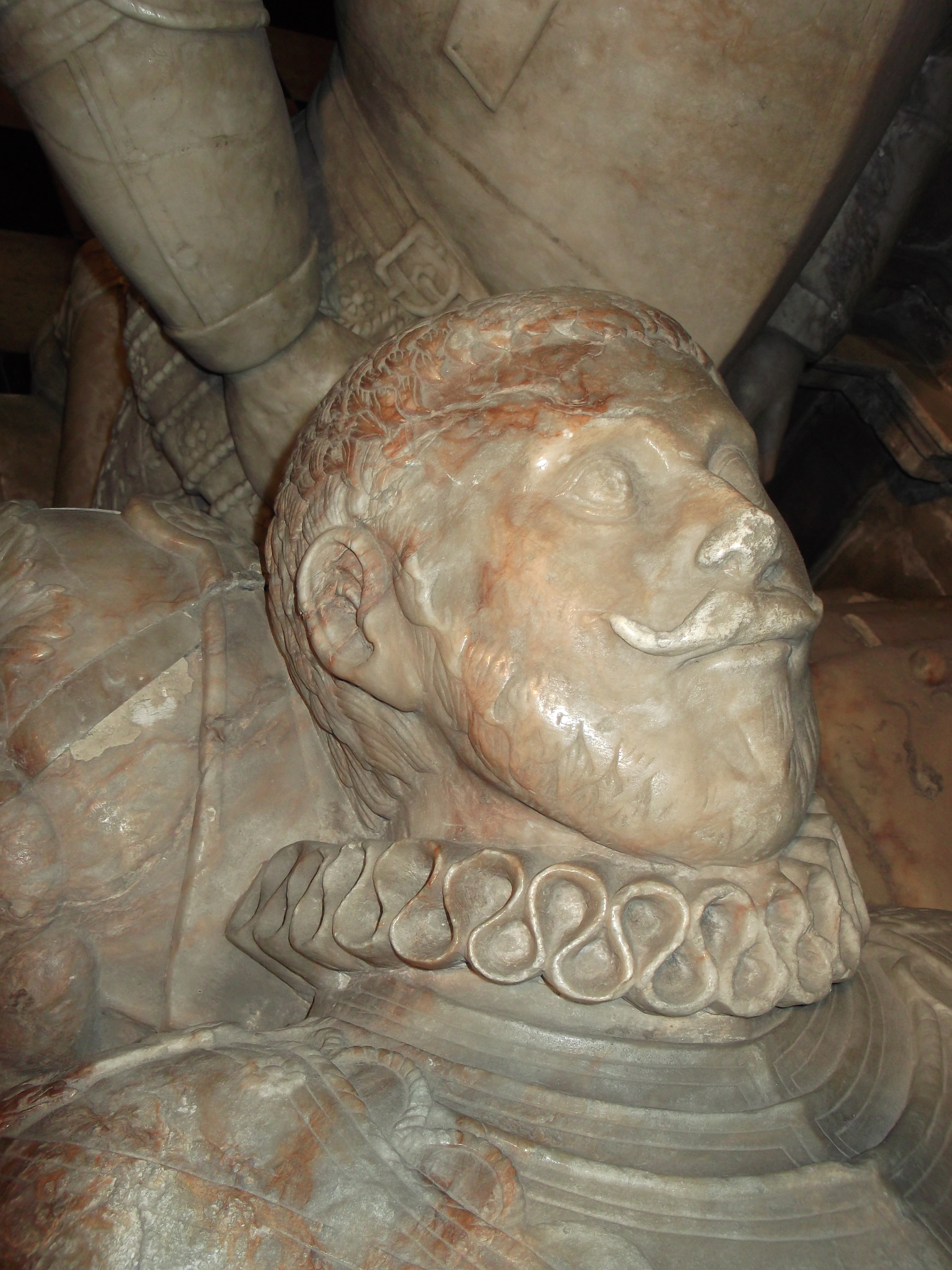
Effigy of Sir Gilbert Gerard on his tomb at Ashley, Staffordshire. He was Bromley's senior and main rival for the Chancellorship.

Bromley succeeded Sir Nicholas Bacon, who had died on 20 February 1579. Bacon had been Lord Keeper of the Great Seal and, on investiture, had been given all the powers of a Lord Chancellor, but never the office itself, probably because of his relatively humble origins. The queen had sent Burleigh and the Earl of Leicester, the main rivals for her attention, to York House, the Lord Keeper's residence, to collect the Great Seal of the Realm from Lady Bacon. The queen then took the seal into her own custody and gave it to Burleigh or Leicester alternately, with Walsingham substituted when Leicester was away.

The reason for the delay was probably the internal debate and manoeuvring over the succession. Gilbert Gerard had been made Attorney General in 1559, immediately after the queen's coronation, and there is a tradition that he had been her lawyer during the reign of Mary. He was senior to Bromley in every way: a distinguished and highly respected lawyer of great experience. However, Campbell states that he was "awkward and ungainly in his speech and manner, and not considered fit for such a place of representation and dignity." Although very reliable, Gerard was known to be on good terms with recusants in his native Lancashire and his wife and daughters were Catholics. Bromley seems to have been entirely untroubled by ideological and theological concerns and was certainly happy to ally himself with the more radically Protestant grouping around Leicester. He also had the support of the Inner Templar Christopher Hatton, a chronically indebted courtier, who had the ear of the queen. Bernardino de Mendoza, the Spanish ambassador reported home that Leicester and Hatton had recommended Bromley, hoping to use him as a supporter of the proposed marriage of the queen to Francis, Duke of Anjou, who was sympathetic to the Huguenot cause. The alliance was evidently cemented with money, as Bromley had promised a pension to Leicester and Hatton. Bromley was duly appointed both Keeper of the Great Seal and Lord Chancellor, over the head of Gerard, who was compensated two years later with the post of Master of the Rolls. Bromley was knighted in May 1579.

=== Important cases ===
In 1581 Bromley played an important part in securing a judgment in Shelley's Case, which was for centuries a leading case in property law, although now superseded by legislation. Although the judgment was generally accepted, along with Bromley's part in it, the immediate motivation for it was political. The roots of the case went back more than 30 years: Sir William Shelley, the purchaser of the estates at issue had died in 1549. The queen instructed Bromley to assemble the judges to make a definite ruling. The defendant, Henry Shelley, who was successful, was a committed Protestant: the lessor of the plaintiff, Richard Shelly had been imprisoned as a Catholic the previous year.

The 1582 case of Thomas Knyvett is generally cited as an example of Bromley's independence of judgment in many cases. Knyvett was a confidant of the queen who had been a gentleman of the Privy Chamber for at least ten years When he murdered a retainer of Edward de Vere, 17th Earl of Oxford, the inquiry jury found that he had acted in self-defence and applied to Bromley for a special commission to clear him in privy session. Hatton also pressured Bromley to "please the Queen in this case." However, Bromley refused to oblige, pointing out that Knyvett might still be open to an appeal of felony. He held his position, despite the queen's displeasure, later justifying himself in writing.

=== Political and constitutional issues ===
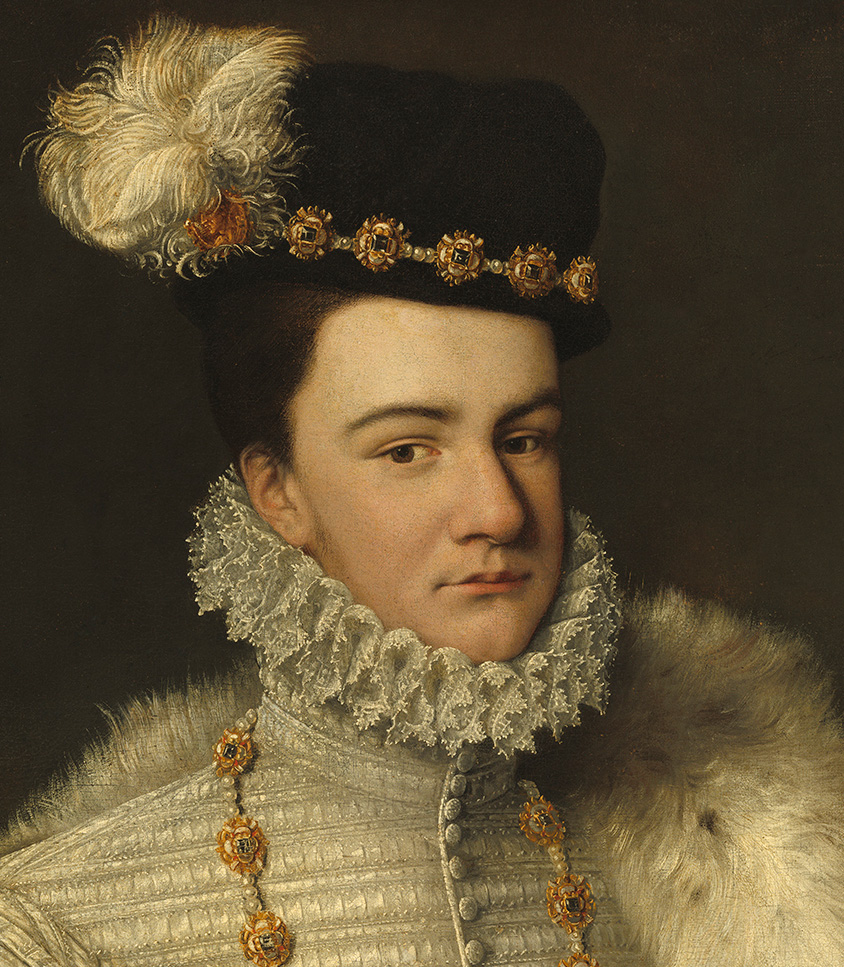
Francis, Duke of Anjou, the principal French suitor of Elizabeth I. Bromley and the Leicester faction at first supported him as tolerant of Huguenots and later opposed him as a potential Catholic king of England.

Bromley was called upon to settle a number of important parliamentary matters. In 1581, Richard Broughton, one of the members for Stafford, informed Parliament that his colleague, probably Thomas Purslow, had been indicted for a felony. Bromley wrote to the Commons, claiming that he had been pressured to issue a writ for a by-election. This he refused to do unless and until the member was convicted – a decision that was welcomed by the Commons.

On 16 January the following year, representatives of the Commons approached Bromley for advice because the Speaker, Robert Bell had died in office. Bromley Informed the House of Lords and it was decided to send a deputation from the two Houses to see the queen. Bromley was then instructed to tell the Commons to elect a new Speaker for themselves, with the admonition that they were not to "intermeddle with any matter touching her Majesty's person or estate, or Church government." They elected Sir John Popham, but did not entirely heed Bromley's warning. In his closing speech Bromley excluded from the queen's thanks those MPs who "had dealt more rashly in some things than was fit for them to do so."

In 1582 the queen consulted Bromley about her proposed marriage to the Duke of Anjou, which he and the Leicester faction now opposed. Bromley stressed that Parliament would expect the queen to settle the succession question if she married a Catholic, which she was reluctant to do.

=== Honour and profit ===
Bromley had reached the peak of his power and influence and reaped both prestige and wealth, not all of it from judicial sources. In 1580 he was licensed to import 200 packs of wool annually from Ireland, an opportunity that reinforced his natural inclination to side with the Shropshire towns against the monopolistic claims of Chester. The following year, Drake made him a present of captured Spanish gold plate on his return from circumnavigating the Earth. In 1582 he was able to use his influence with the queen to thwart attempts to shift production of cloth from Welsh wool back into Wales and to move the staple to Chester, winning the approbation of the merchants and municipalities of Shrewsbury and Oswestry, who had most to lose from the proposed changes. Shrewsbury's council voted 20 marks for a piece of plate in gratitude for his political support. In 1585 he obtained the right to grant licences for alnage, or supervision of the quality of woollen cloth – a position of mutual advantage for himself and his regional allies.

A major academic honour accorded to Bromley in 1585 was appointment as deputy chancellor of Oxford University, in succession to the Earl of Leicester, who was embarking on his expedition to the Netherlands.

Royal grants and purchases allowed Bromley to build up a significant property portfolio across his native Shropshire and the neighbouring counties of Worcestershire and Montgomeryshire. According to a history of the town, Elizabeth I granted the Manor of Great Malvern in Malvern, Worcestershire, to Sir Thomas, and it remained in the possession of his family through several generations, until sold by Lord Mountfort in about 1740. However, the Victoria County History asserts that his was a former monastic property, originally belonging to Great Malvern Priory, that the reversion had been held by John Lumley, 1st Baron Lumley and the transfer was to the Lord Chancellor's son, Sir Henry Bromley, although the date is given as 1586, within Thomas's lifetime. Though the details are hazy, it seems that the manor was intended by the queen as a reward for Thomas Bromley's loyal and competent service. The manor of Wick Episcopi, formerly an estate of the Bishop of Worcester, as the name suggests, certainly was granted to Thomas Bromley by the queen in 1586 and subsequently had a similar history. Holt, in the Malvern Hills, had a chequered history and the estate was divided. Bromley acquired part of it as a marriage settlement from Thomas Fortescue, his wife's brother, and part by direct purchase from Anthony Bourne, the son of John Bourne. A landowner in considerable hardship because of his violence, marital escapades and political unreliability, Bourne was compelled to sell several properties to Bromley. Sir Henry Bromley, the Lord Chancellor's son, completed the acquisition of Holt and it became the family seat.

=== Conspiracies ===
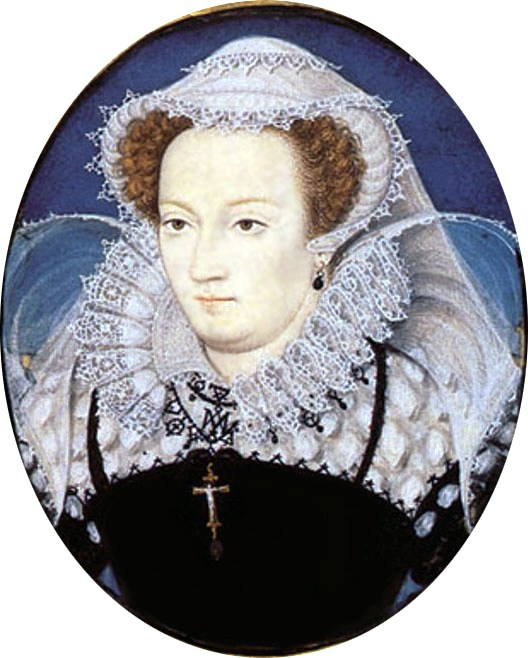
Mary, Queen of Scots, portrayed in 1578 by Nicholas Hilliard.

In the 1580s came another spate of plots against the regime, centred on Mary, Queen of Scots. Henry Percy, 8th Earl of Northumberland was arrested in the aftermath of the Throckmorton Plot of 1583 on suspicion of complicity but later released. After contacting the French ambassador, he was rearrested and imprisoned in the Tower of London, where he was found dead in his cell on 21 June 1585. Three days later a commission of inquiry in the form of a meeting of peers in the Star Chamber. Bromley announced that Northumberland had committed suicide after participating in a conspiracy, although suspicions remained that he had been murdered.

On 23 November 1585 Parliament was convened specifically to confront the issue of the Scottish queen. There were legal difficulties inherent in trying Mary before the House of Lords, as she was not an English peeress, and an ordinary criminal trial would lead to political difficulties abroad. Bromley announced at the opening a bill to provide for the trial of Mary, using a special court of at least 24 peers and privy counsellors. This soon passed into law.

In September 1586 Bromley was actively involved in the examination and trial of Anthony Babington and his associates, whose conspiracy had aimed to assassinate Elizabeth and to enthrone Mary, with her knowledge. The following month, after the execution of the plotters, Bromley moved to convene a court to try Mary herself.

== Trial of Mary, Queen of Scots ==
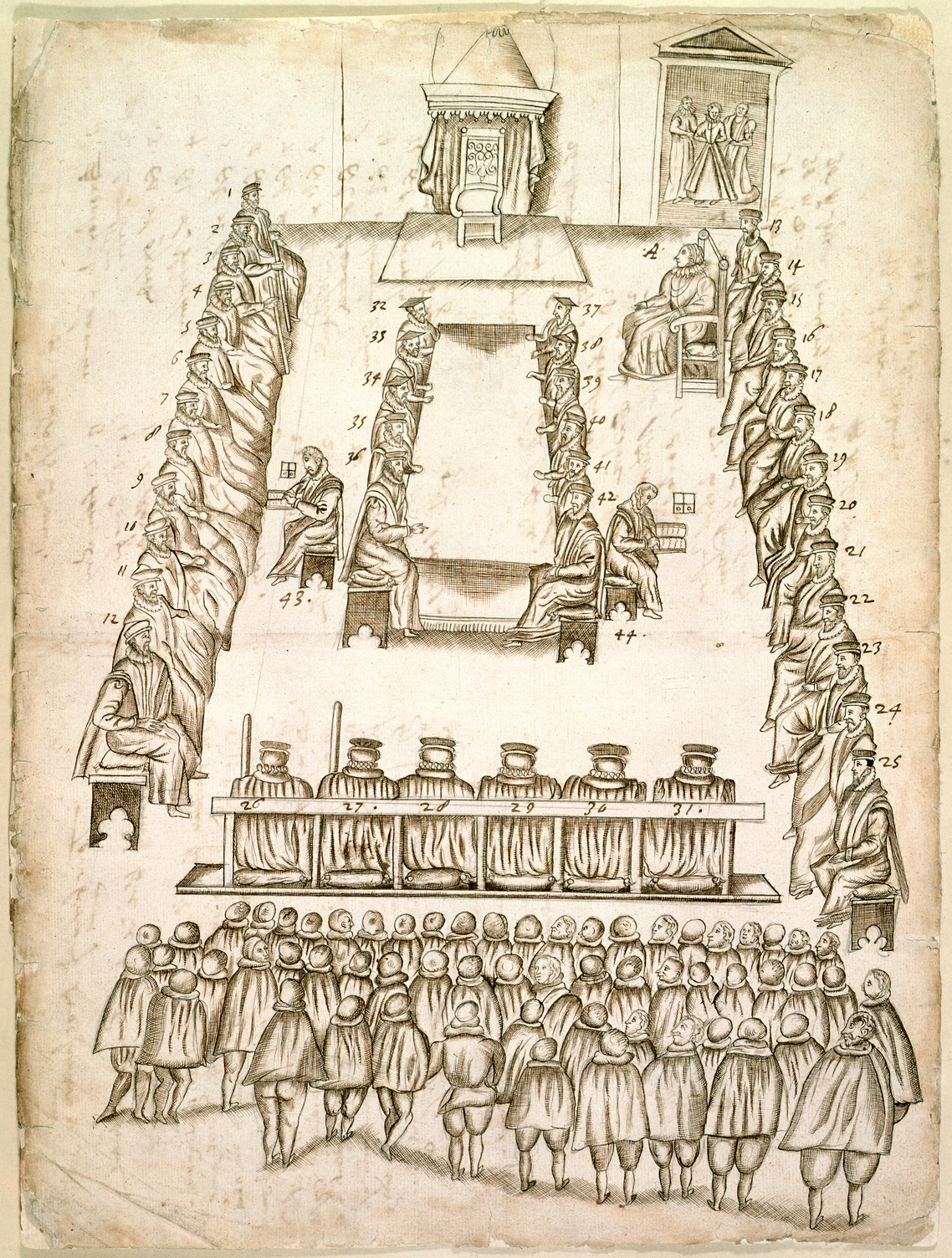
Contemporary drawing of the trial. Queen Elizabeth was represented by an empty throne.

As Lord Chancellor, it was Bromley who presided over the court which tried Mary, Queen of Scots. It consisted of 36 of the 45 privy counsellors, judges and peers, who had been appointed to the commission and assembled on 11 November 1586 at Fotheringhay Castle, where Mary was imprisoned. She was brought before the court on 14 October but protested immunity from a foreign jurisdiction. Bromley read a passage from a letter of the queen, stating baldly that "as she lived under the protection of the Queen of England, she was bound to respect the law of England. Bromley maintained personal respect towards Mary throughout the trial but continued to insist that "neither her imprisonment nor her prerogative of Royal Majesty could exempt her from answering in this kingdom." The prosecution was led by Francis Gawdy, Bromley's old associate from the Inner Temple and now Queen's Serjeant. Mary did not openly contest her knowledge of Babington's plot to set her free and even admitted countenancing a French invasion. However, she flatly denied any involvement in the plan to assassinate Elizabeth. After two days, the trial was adjourned to 25 October at the Star Chamber, where the guilty verdicts were delivered.

It was then Bromley's task to announce at the opening of Parliament

That the present parliament was summoned for no usual causes; not for making new laws, whereof her Majesty thought there were more made than executed; nor for subsidies with which, although there was some occasion for them, her Majesty would not burden her faithful subjects at this time, but the cause was rare and extraordinary; of great weight, great peril, and dangerous consequence. He next declared what plots had been contrived of late, and how miraculously the merciful providence of God, by the discovery thereof, beyond all human policy, had preserved her Majesty, the destruction of whose sacred person was most traitorously imagined, and designed to be compassed.

He then outlined the case to the House of Lords and both houses resolved to petition the queen for immediate execution. The address was delivered by Bromley and Elizabeth assented, although she did not actually sign the death warrant until 1 February 1587, after much hesitation. Bromley appended the Great Seal and the warrant was entrusted to William Davison. Even then it took a small secret Privy Council meeting under Burleigh to make the decision for action and Davison was held responsible by the queen.

== Death ==
Mary, queen of Scots, was executed at Fotheringhay on 7 February 1587. When Parliament assembled eight days later, Bromley was too ill to attend and his place was taken by Edmund Anderson. He died on 12 April at the age of 57 and was buried in Westminster Abbey on 2 May.

Bromley's demise is often attributed to strain of the trial and the responsibility of ordering the execution of a monarch, and to his apprehension at Elizabeth's response to the execution. However, this corresponds to no specific illness, but it is a recurring motif found in accounts of other 16th-century judges, like Richard Morgan. Foss gave no explanation of Bromley's death and more recent sources do not speculate. He was not a young man by the standards of the time: his namesake and cousin, the chief justice, died probably at a slightly earlier age.

== Family ==
Bromley married, by 1560 at latest, Elizabeth Fortescue, daughter of Sir Adrian Fortescue, a Hertfordshire landowner. Sir Adrian was executed on 9 July 1539 under an act of attainder that was mainly directed at the Pole family, including the Countess of Salisbury. However Fortescue's offence was unspecified, the clause relating to him mentioning "diverse and sundrie detestable and abhomynable treasons." In the 17th century Sir Adrian was to be venerated as a Catholic martyr and he was beatified in 1895. However, the real reasons for his execution remain mysterious and it is not at all clear that he was a religious conservative: in fact, his earlier period in favour had been because of his kinship to Anne Boleyn but he seems to have been on poor terms with Thomas Cromwell. So he may have been attached to the attainder as an act of political or personal spite among Protestants.

Elizabeth Fortescue was one of the offspring of Sir Adrian's second marriage, to Anne Rede. One of her brothers was John Fortescue of Salden, who had been in Princess Elizabeth's service during the reign of her Catholic sister, Mary I, and proved a pillar of the Elizabethan regime and a persistent parliamentarian, later becoming Chancellor of the Exchequer. Her brother Anthony Fortescue, on the other hand, actually was a Catholic conspirator, closely involved with the Pole family. Another brother, Thomas, seems to have negotiated Elizabeth's marriage with Bromley, purchasing part of the manor of Holt from Anthony Bourne to settle on her in 1578.

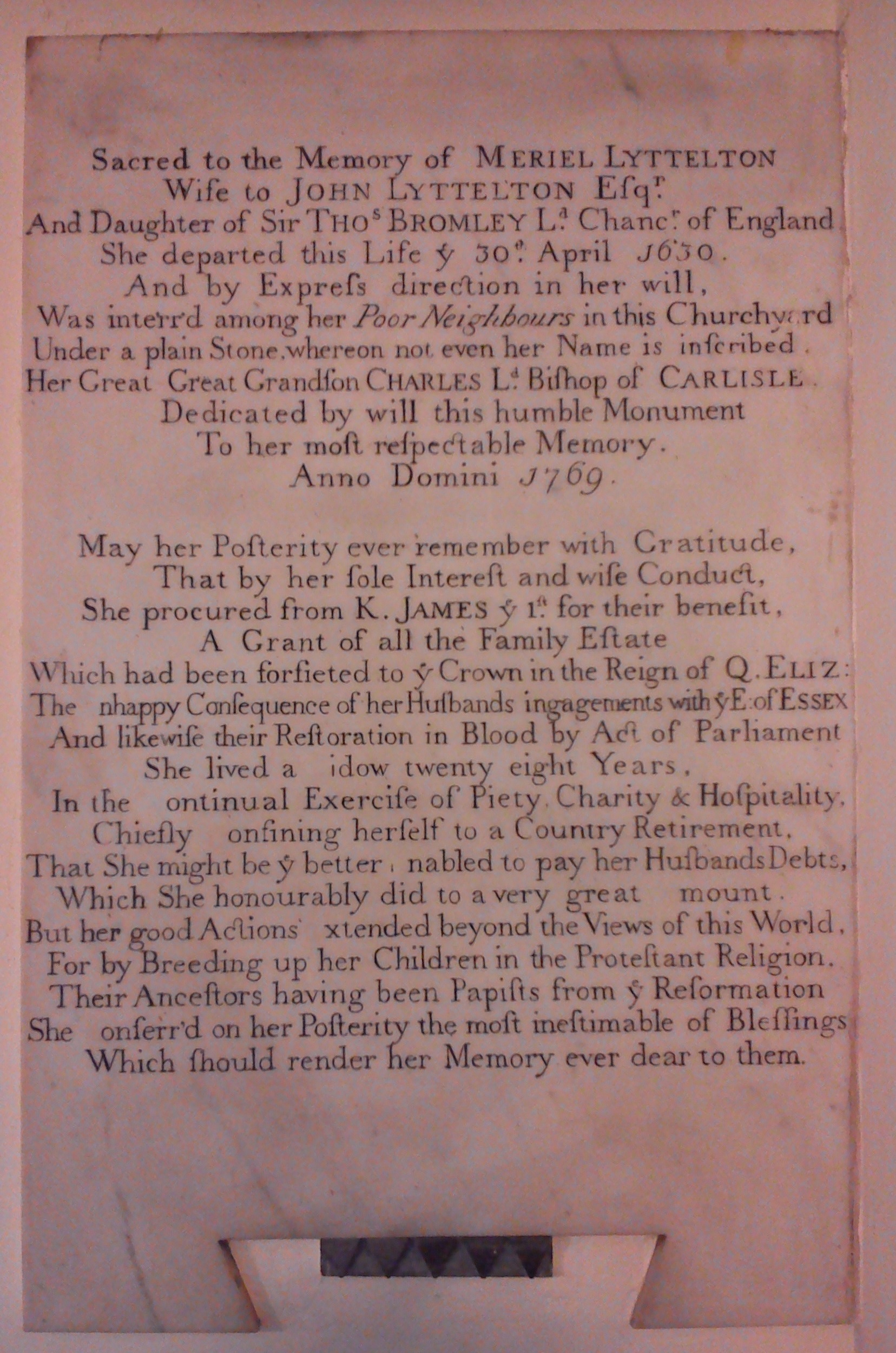
St John the Baptist Church, Hagley, monument to Sir Thomas Bromley's daughter Meriel, wife of Sir John Lyttelton, with a remarkable anti-Catholic inscription

Bromley and Elizabeth had four sons and four daughters. Of these:

- Sir Henry Bromley, the eldest son and heir, and a politician of at least regional importance, married Elizabeth Pelham. Their son,

- Thomas Bromley, was an MP of the early 17th century.

- Elizabeth Bromley married Oliver Cromwell, uncle of the Lord Protector
- Anne Bromley married Richard Corbet, son of Reginald Corbet (a distinguished judge) by his wife Alice Gratewood niece and heiress of Sir Rowland Hill; their son:

- Sir John Corbet, 1st Baronet, of Stoke upon Tern, known as "the Patriot," was a determined opponent of absolute monarchy and an important Parliamentarian and Presbyterian leader regionally during the English Civil War.

- Meriel Bromley married John Lyttelton. They were the ancestors of the Lyttelton Baronets and Barons Lyttelton.

=== Family tree: Descendants of Thomas Bromley ===
Family Tree: Descendants of Thomas Bromley

Based primarily on the Heraldic Visitation of Worcestershire, with assistance from the History of Parliament Online and Cokayne's Complete Baronetage.

THOMAS BROMLEY (1530-87), of Rodd Castle and Hodnet, MP for Bridgnorth, Wigan and Guildford, Lord Chancellor	Elizabeth Fortescue of Shirburn, Oxfordshire
Sir Oliver Cromwell (died 1655) of Hinchingbrooke House and Ramsey Abbey, MP for Huntingdonshire	Elizabeth Bromley	John Lyttelton (1561–1601), MP for Worcestershire	Muriel or Meriel Bromley
Elizabeth Pelham	Sir Henry Bromley (c. 1560-1615), of Holt Castle and Shrawardine Castle, MP for Plymouth, Worcestershire and Shropshire	Anne Scott	Joan or Jane Bromley	Edward Greville (1566–1634) of Milcote, MP for Warwickshire	Anne Bromley	Richard Corbet (died 1601) of Adderley and Stoke upon Tern
Anne Walsh of Shelsley Walsh	Sir Thomas Bromley (c. 1585-1641) of Holt Castle, MP for Worcestershire	Henry Bromley of Upton-upon-Severn	Mary Lygon of Madresfield	Sir Thomas Lyttelton, 1st Baronet (1595–1650), MP for Worcestershire and Leominster	Katherine Crompton of Driffield	Sir John Corbet, 1st Baronet, of Stoke upon Tern (1594–1662), MP for Shropshire, known as "the Patriot"	Anne Mainwaring of Ightfield, known as "the Good Lady"
Henry Bromley of Holt (died 1652)	Beatrice Newport, daughter of Richard Newport, 1st Baron Newport	Henry Bromley of Upton (died 1667)	Dorothy Godbold	Sir Henry Lyttelton, 2nd Baronet (c. 1624-93), MP for Lichfield	Sir Charles Lyttelton, 3rd Baronet (c. 1629-1716), MP for Bewdley	Anne Temple	Sir John Corbet, 2nd Baronet (1619-65)	Lettice Knollys or Laetitia Knowles, daughter of Sir Robert Knollys of Greys Court, Oxfordshire
Mercy Pytts daughter of Edward Pytts of Kyre Park	Henry Bromley of Holt (1632-70), MP for Worcestershire	Elizabeth Lench	Henry Bromley of Upton	Christian Temple, daughter of Sir Richard Temple, 3rd Baronet	Sir Thomas Lyttelton, 4th Baronet (1686–1751), MP for Worcestershire and Camelford	Theophila Campbell of Woodford	Sir John Corbet, 3rd Baronet (c. 1645-95)
William Bromley (1656–1707) of Holt, MP for Worcester and Worcestershire	Margaret Berkeley, daughter of Sir Rowland Berkeley of Cotheridge	William Bromley of Upton (1685–1756), MP for Tewkesbury	Judith Hanbury	Lucy Fortescue	George Lyttelton, 1st Baron Lyttelton (1709-73), MP for Okehampton	Elizabeth Rich	Sir Robert Corbet, 4th Baronet (1670–1740), MP for Shropshire	Jane Hooker

== Legacy ==
His rule in Shelley's Case is a landmark in the history of English real property law.

== Notes ==
Political offices
Preceded by Richard Onslow	Solicitor General; 1569–1579	Succeeded by John Popham
Preceded by Nicholas Bacon as Lord Keeper	Lord Chancellor; 1579–1587	Succeeded by Christopher Hatton
Academic offices
Preceded by Earl of Leicester	Chancellor of the University of Oxford; 1585–1587	Succeeded by Sir Christopher Hatton
