= Meriel Lyttelton =

English aristocrat

Meriel Lyttelton or Littelton (died 1630) was an English aristocrat with extensive family and court connections. She was a daughter of Sir Thomas Bromley and Elizabeth Fortescue. The MP for Worcestershire Thomas Bromley (died 1641) was her nephew.

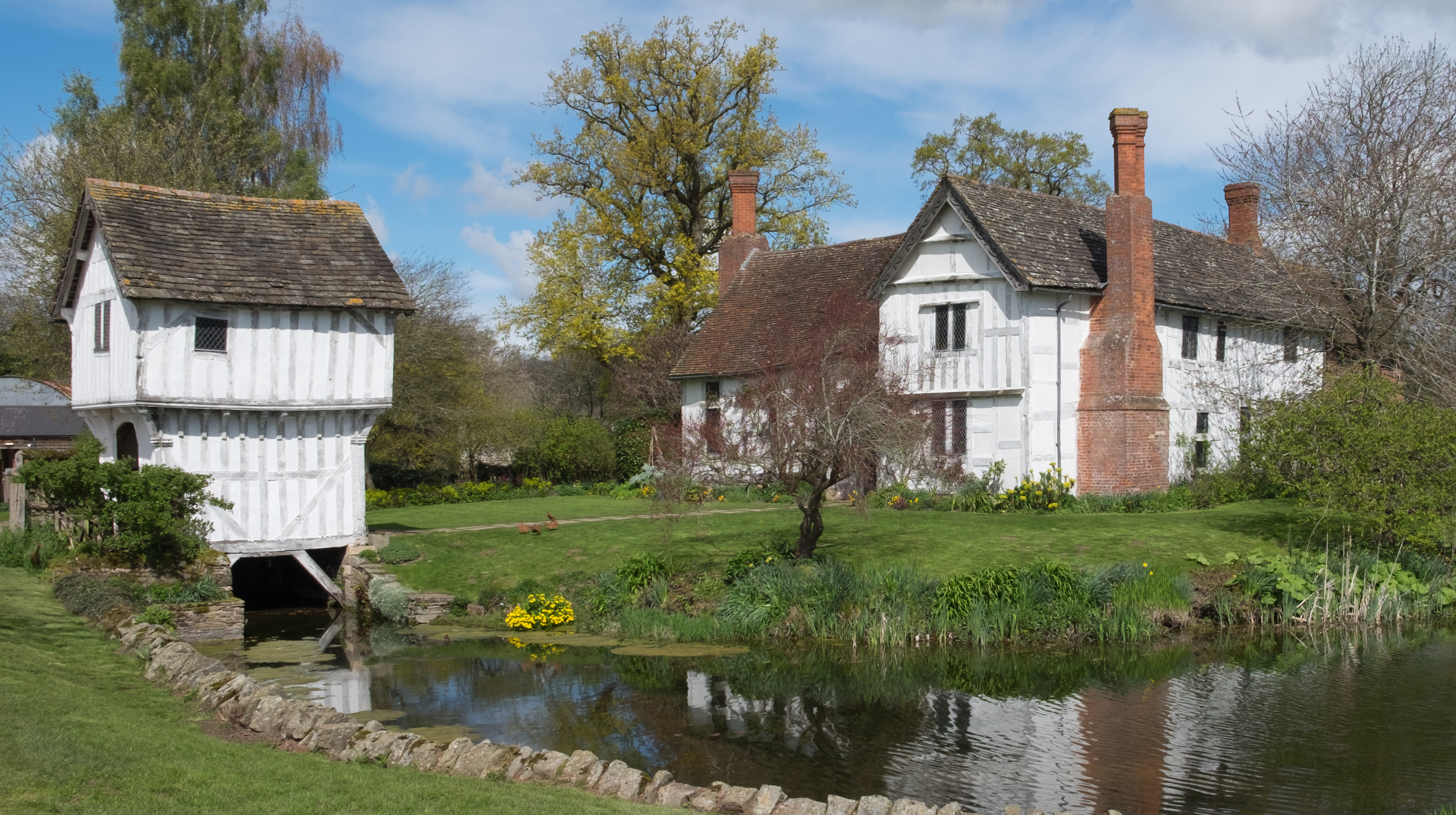
Amphylis Barnaby of Brockhampton hoped Meriel Littleton could help a cousin join Prince Henry's household

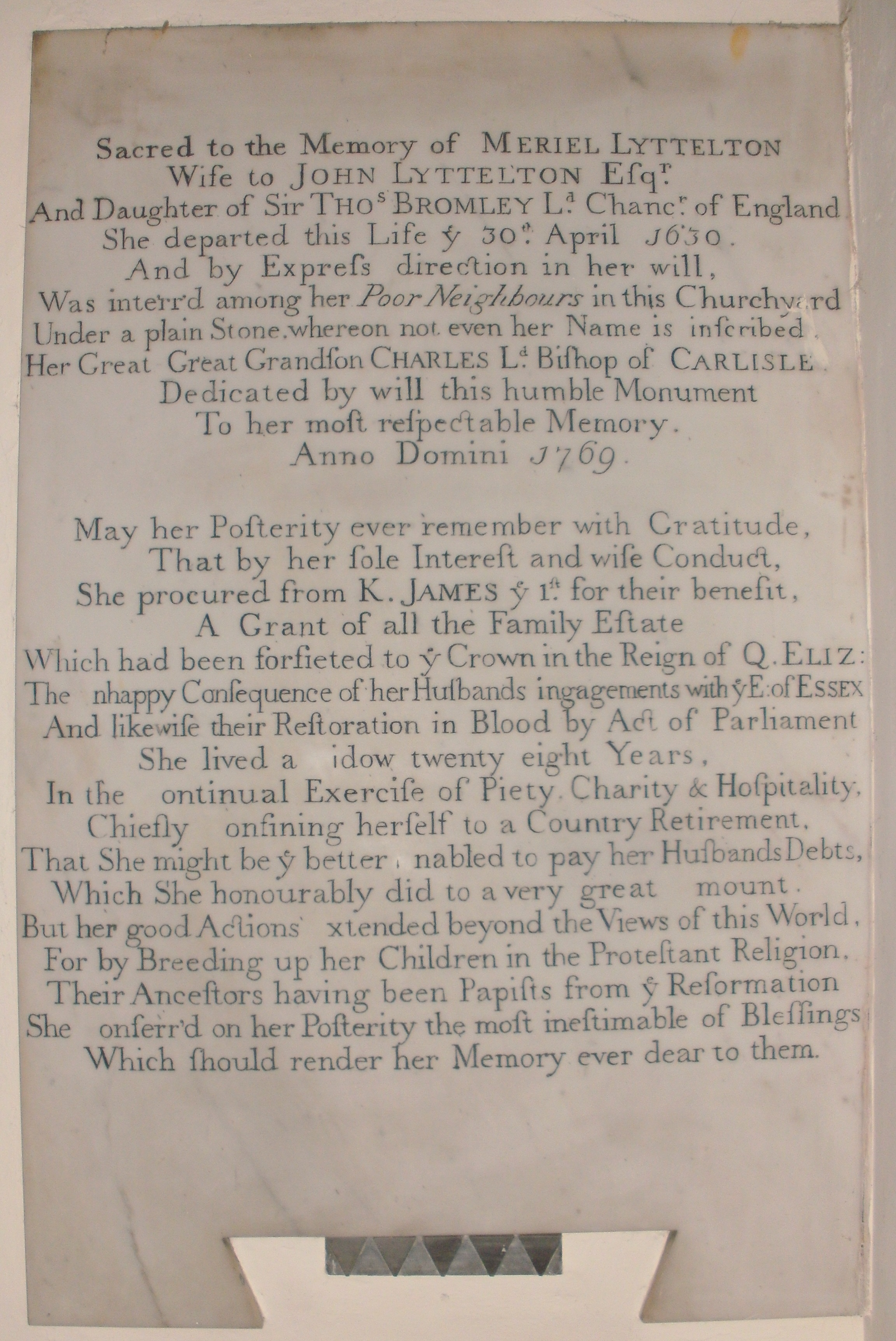
Memorial to Meriel Lyttelton from 1769, remembered "for Breeding up her Children in the Protestant Religion, Their Ancestors having been Papists", St John the Baptist Church, Hagley

== Essex conspiracy ==
Meriel married John Lyttelton or Littelton of Hagley and Frankley. John Lyttelton was imprisoned after the rebellion of the Earl of Essex. He wrote to Meriel to put his affairs in order and secure the legal deeds and papers in his black box. In another letter he asked her to burn the correspondence in a painted casket. She went to Frankley House to collect some letters in February 1601 but was interrupted by John Washburn of Wichenford, Sheriff of Worcestershire. He found some letters for Charles Danvers, one of the Essex conspirators, in a desk in her closet. John Lyttleton died in the King's Bench Prison.

In 1603, at the Union of the Crowns, Meriel Lyttelton travelled north to Doncaster to meet the new king James VI and I. He restored her family estates, following her petitions made in London. She obtained a "reversal of attainder" dated 17 June 1603.

== Correspondence and the court ==
Amphylis Barneby (died 1633) of Bockleton and Brockhampton wanted to get a cousin a place in the household of Prince Henry. She wrote to her friend and niece by marriage Meriel Lyttelton for help. Meriel Lyttelton explained to her that competition was fierce for these court positions and the social advantages they might bring. Mrs Barnaby had been misled by what she had heard from Thomas Cornwall of Burford (1571-1635) and his wife Anne Cornwall, a daughter of Gilbert Lyttelton. Young Barneby had no chance of getting a place. Meriel Lyttelton's brother Henry Bromley of Holt was better placed than the Cornwalls to prefer his son for a position with the Prince, but he held back, waiting for a better time. Meriel Lyttelton's reply is undated, but the letter may date from 1604.

In January 1606 two of the Gunpowder Plot conspirators, Robert Wintour and Stephen Lyttelton, were found at Hagley and their armoury blew up, after the cook had betrayed them. Meriel Littleton was away. Her brother-in-law Humphrey Littleton was executed at Red Hill by hanging with Edward Oldcorne, John Wintour, and Ralph Ashley on 7 April 1606.

Meriel Lyttelton kept a letterbook. She wrote to Lady Elizabeth Fenton, wife of the Scottish courtier Viscount Fenton, decling an invitation to spend the summer with her at Englefield, and in a letter of 1606 from Frankley promised to see her in London. She wrote to a friend about her struggles with Thomas Coningsby, a Herefordshire relation, and uncle of Anne Cornwall, who was trying to obtain some woodland belonging to her.

She wrote to her aunt, Muriel Knyvett about legal business, religion, and family events. She wrote of the costs of sending her sons to school and Oxford. After the death of her husband she shared her troubles with her aunt.

Meriel Lyttleton had rights in Halesowen and in June 1608 had a proclamation made against a Sabbath-breaking Sunday dairy produce market.

Her portrait was at Hagley Hall in 1775.

She died on 30 April 1630 and was buried at St John the Baptist Church, Hagley, where she is commemorated by a later inscription.

== Family ==
Her children included:

- Sir Thomas Lyttelton, 1st Baronet
- Bridget Lyttelton, who married Robert Tracy, 2nd Viscount Tracy (died 1662)
