= Thomas Russell (died 1632) =

Member of the Parliament of England

Thomas Russell (1577–1632) was an English politician who sat in the House of Commons in 1601.

Russell was the son of Sir John Russell of Strensham. He matriculated at St John's College, Oxford on 5 November 1591, aged 14. In 1601, he was elected member of parliament for Worcestershire. He was knighted on 11 May 1603. He was High Sheriff of Worcestershire in 1604. In 1610 he and his son William were granted the office of Masters of the Game in Malvern Chase.

He is sometimes associated with the Thomas Russell who sat for Truro in 1614, but while the identity of this man is not clear, it is likely he was a different individual. Russell had become a recusant by this point, and would not have been re-elected to the Commons.

Parliament of England
Preceded by John Lyttelton jnr Edward Colles	Member of Parliament for Worcestershire; 1601; With: Thomas Leighton	Succeeded by Sir Henry Bromley; Sir William Lygon
