= William Lygon =

English House of Commons politician

Sir William Lygon (1568–1608) was an English politician who sat in the House of Commons at various times between 1589 and 1608.

Lygon was the eldest son of Richard Lygon of Madresfield Court, Worcestershire and his wife Mary Russell, daughter of Sir Thomas Russell of Strensham. He succeeded to the estates of Madresfield and elsewhere on the death of his father in 1584 but was required to sell off or mortgage much property over the years. In 1589, he was elected Member of Parliament for Worcestershire. In 1594, he had to sell the manor of Warndon, probably to pay for the rebuilding of the manor house at Madresfield. He was J.P. for Worcestershire from about 1591 and High Sheriff of Worcestershire from 1592 to 1593. He was Deputy Lieutenant and was commissioner for musters from 1595. In November 1599 in an improved financial situation, he bought the manor of Pixham, Worcestershire but in 1602 had to sell other property in the manor of Acton Beauchamp. He was knighted in 1603. In 1604 he was elected MP for Worcestershire again and sat until his death.

Lygon died at the age of about 60.

Lygon married Elizabeth Harwell, daughter of Edward Harwell of Besford, in around 1590 and had three sons and two daughters. His son William, who inherited the encumbered estates, had to sell off more of them.

Parliament of England
| Preceded by John Russell; John Lyttelton jnr | Member of Parliament for Worcestershire; 1589; With: Sir John Russell | Succeeded by Sir Henry Bromley; William Walsh |
| Preceded by Thomas Leighton; Thomas Russell | Member of Parliament for Worcestershire; 1604–1608; With: Sir Henry Bromley | Succeeded by Sir Henry Bromley; Sir Samuel Sandys |
