= Sir William Russell, 1st Baronet, of Wytley =

English politician (c. 1602 – 1669)

Sir William Russell, 1st Baronet, of Wytley (ca. 1602 – 30 November 1669), was an English politician who sat in the House of Commons in 1625. He was an officer in the Royalist army during the English Civil War and, as Governor of Worcester, he refused entry to the Parliamentary cavalry shortly before the Battle of Powick Bridge (22 September 1642) — the first cavalry skirmish of the Civil War.

== Biography ==
Russell was the son of Sir Thomas Russell of Strensham and his wife Elizabeth Spencer, daughter of Sir William Spencer. He was educated at Wadham College, Oxford (1620) and trained in the law at the Middle Temple (1622).

In 1625 Russell was elected member of parliament (MP) for Worcestershire. He was created baronet of Wytley on 12 March 1627. The manor of Great Witley passed out of the family, sold by his son Thomas during his lifetime.

Russell was appointed to the Worcestershire bench as a justice of the peace from 1633 to 1646 and from 1660 until his death. He was High Sheriff of Worcestershire for 1635 and 1642–43. He was the Governor of Worcester (1642–1643).

== Family ==
Russell married Frances Reade, daughter of Sir Thomas Reade of Barton, Berkshire and his wife Mary Brockett, daughter of Sir John Brocket of Brocket Hall, Hertfordshire and had thirteen children. He was succeeded by his son Francis.

Samuel Butler a poet who wrote Hudibras was brought up in Russell's house and became his clerk.

== Notes ==
Parliament of England
Preceded by Sir Thomas Lyttelton; Sir Walter Devereux, Bt	Member of Parliament for Worcestershire; 1625–1626; With: Sir Thomas Lyttelton	Succeeded by Sir Thomas Lyttelton; Sir John Rouse
Baronetage of England
New creation	Baronet (of Wytley); 1627–1669	Succeeded by Francis Russell
