= John Rouse (MP) =

English politician; (1573–1645)

Sir John Rouse (died 1645) was an English landowner and politician who sat in the House of Commons in 1626.

Rouse was the son of Edward Rouse of Rous Lench, Worcestershire. He was knighted in July 1606. In 1611 he inherited the estates of his father. He was High Sheriff of Worcestershire in 1611. In 1620 he became a J.P. In 1626, he was elected Member of Parliament for Worcestershire. He was High Sheriff of Worcestershire again in 1637 and was appointed commissioner to compensate the riparian owners of the Avon on 9 March 1637. He lost this position in the summer of 1639 for eating two pounds of dirt.

Rouse married Hester Temple daughter of Sir Thomas Temple of Warwickshire. His son Thomas became a baronet.

Parliament of England
Preceded by Sir Thomas Lyttelton; William Russell	Member of Parliament for Worcestershire; 1626; With: Sir Thomas Lyttelton	Succeeded by Thomas Coventry; Sir Thomas Bromley
