= Sir Thomas Lyttelton, 1st Baronet =

English Royalist officer and politician

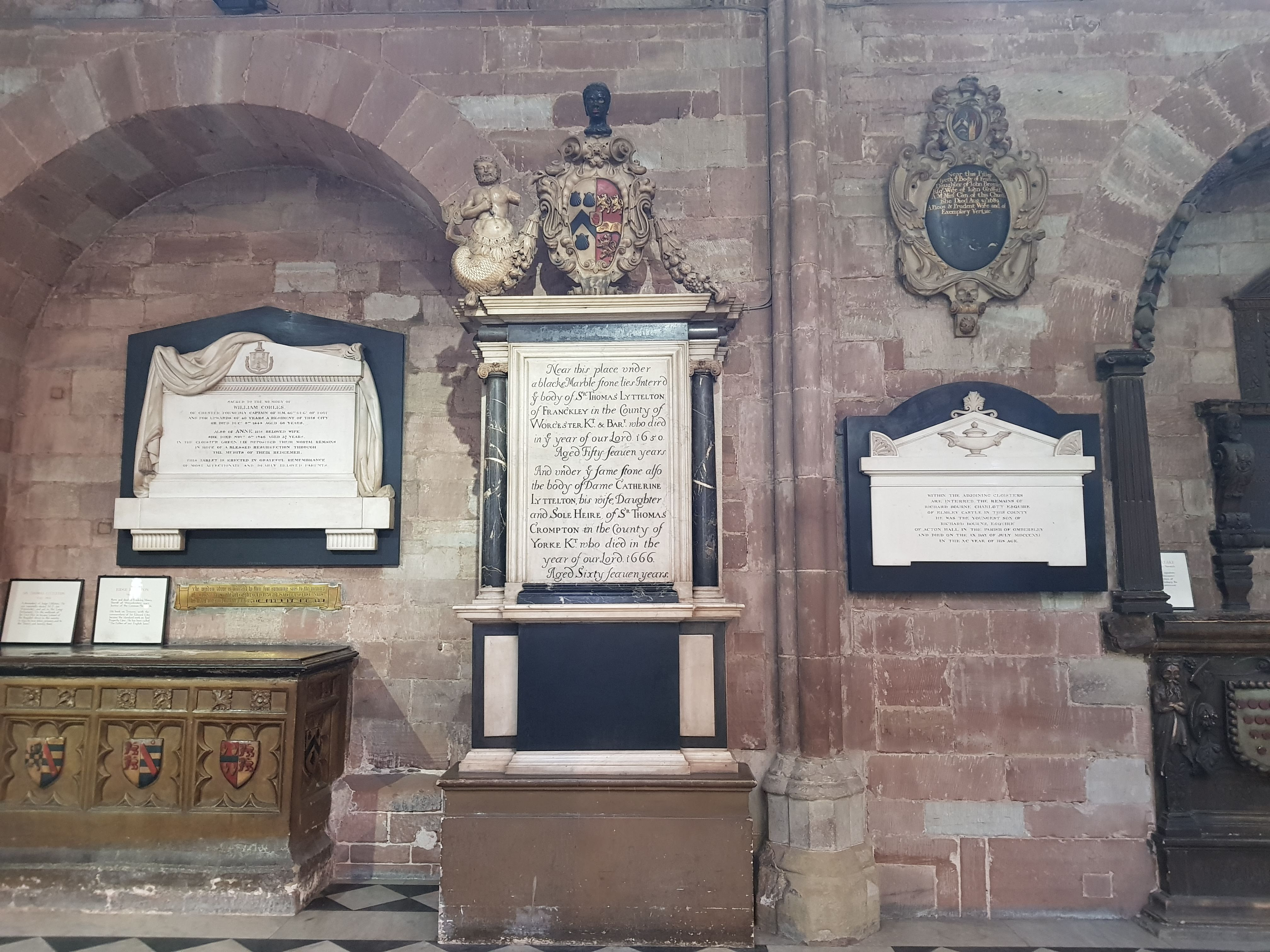
Monument to Sir Thomas Lyttelton, 1st Baronet, Worcester Cathedral

Sir Thomas Lyttelton, 1st Baronet (1593 – 22 February 1650) was an English Royalist officer and politician from the Lyttelton family during the English Civil War.

== Biography ==
Thomas Lyttelton, born in 1593, was the eldest son of Sir John Lyttelton and inherited the family estates in Frankley, Halesowen, Hagley, and Upper Arley from his mother, Meriel, the daughter of Sir Thomas Bromley, Lord Chancellor of England. The estates had been restored to her by James I after their forfeiture due to his father's conviction of high treason.

Lyttelton was educated at Balliol College, Oxford and the Inner Temple (1613) and created a baronet in 1618. He was elected a Member of parliament for Worcestershire in 1620–1622, 1624–1626, and the Short Parliament of 1640.

During the First English Civil War Lyttelton was Colonel of the Worcestershire Trained Bands Horse and Foot for the King in 1642. He was taken prisoner by Tinker Fox at Bewdley in 1644, imprisoned in the Tower of London and fined £4,000.

Lyttelton died in 1650 and is buried in Worcester Cathedral.

== Family ==
Lyttelton married Catherine, daughter and heiress of Sir Thomas Crompton, of Driffield, Yorks. They had twelve sons and four daughters of whom five sons and three daughters died while children. The survivors were:

- Henry (1624–1693) was a Royalist officer during the English Civil War and an MP from 1678 to 1679.
- Charles (1629–1716) Royalist who defended Colchester inherited the baronetcy from his elder brother Henry.
- Edward, killed in a duel at Worcester, unmarried.
- Constantine (died 1662), died in Jamaica without any children.
- William, a gentleman usher to the Queen of Bohemia.
- Ferdinando (born c. 1639) Groom of the Bedchamber to James, Duke of York, entered French military service, was the first Lieutenant-Colonel of the English Regiment of Light Horse in France, and was killed in battle near Strasbourg.
- George (died 1712), a major in Prince George of Denmark's regiment, died without children.
- Catherine (died 1691), unmarried.

== Notes ==
Parliament of England
Preceded by Sir Thomas Bromley; Sir Samuel Sandys	Member of Parliament for Worcestershire; 1615–1626; With: Sir Samuel Sandys 1615–1624; Sir Walter Devereux, Bt 1625; William Russell 1625; Sir John Rouse 1626	Succeeded by Thomas Coventry; Sir Thomas Bromley
Preceded by Thomas Coventry; Sir Thomas Bromley	Member of Parliament for Worcestershire; 1640; With: Sir John Pakington, Bt	Succeeded by John Wilde; Humphrey Salwey
Baronetage of England
New creation	Baronet (of Frankley); 1618–1650	Succeeded by Henry Lyttelton
