= Hugh Vaughan =

Member of the Parliament of England

Hugh Vaughan was an English Member of Parliament during the reign of Queen Elizabeth I. He was The Earl of Bedford's steward in the west of England, and entered parliament at a by-election for Bridport in 1581 as the Earl's nominee to replace his heir, Lord Russell, who had been summoned to sit in the House of Lords. He subsequently also represented Dartmouth (in the Parliament of 1584), Plymouth (1586) and Tavistock (1593).
