= Thomas Bromley (died 1641) =

English landowner and politician

Sir Thomas Bromley (1585 – 1641) was an English landowner and politician who sat in the House of Commons at various times between 1614 and 1629.

Bromley was the son of Sir Henry Bromley of Holt Castle, Worcestershire. He matriculated at Queen's College, Oxford on 7 November 1600 aged 15. He was knighted on 23 July 1603. In 1614, he was elected member of parliament for Worcestershire. He was elected MP for Worcestershire again in 1628 and sat until 1629 when King Charles decided to rule without parliament for eleven years.

Bromley died aged about 55 and was buried on 10 September 1641.

Bromley married Anne Walshe, daughter of Sir Richard Walshe.

Parliament of England
Preceded by Sir Henry Bromley; Sir Samuel Sandys	Member of Parliament for Worcestershire; 1614; With: Sir Samuel Sandys	Succeeded by Sir Thomas Lyttelton; Sir Samuel Sandys
Preceded by Sir Thomas Lyttelton; Sir John Rouse	Member of Parliament for Worcestershire; 1628–1629; With: Thomas Coventry	Parliament suspended until 1640
