= Henry Jetto =

17th-century black Worcestershire yeoman

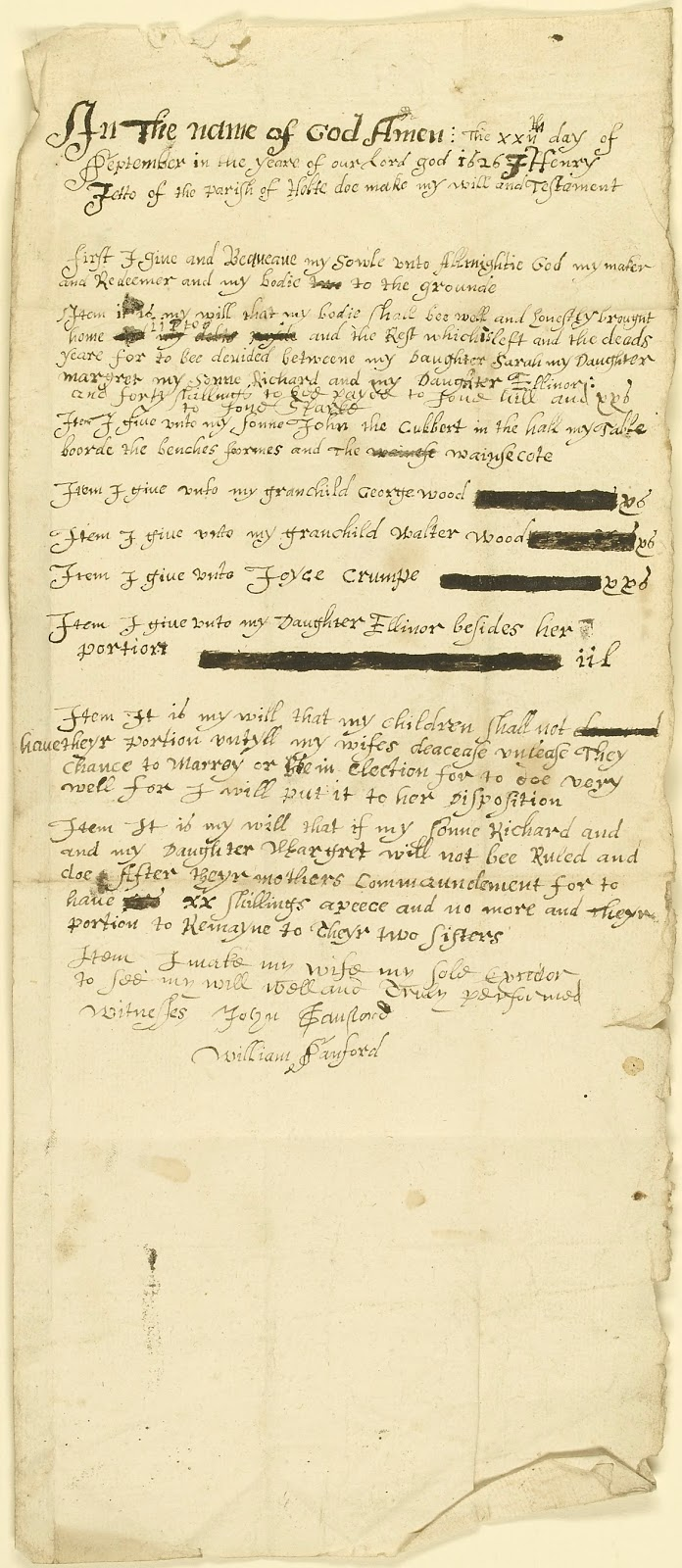
Jetto's will, signed 20 September 1626, and executed on 13 September 1638.

Henry or Henrie Anthonie Jetto (1569/1570 — bur. 30 August 1627) was a black English yeoman, the earliest-known black person with an extant will in England and the earliest to have resided in Worcestershire. He first appears in the historical record as a servant to Sir Henry Bromley of Holt Castle.

== Biography ==
Jetto first appears in records on 3 March 1596, when, at age twenty-six, he was baptised at St Martin's Church, Holt, Worcestershire. In city records, he is referred to as a "Blackemore" - a contemporary term for a black person - and his surname "Jetto" is likely a nod to the adjective "jet", meaning black. This, alongside his adult baptism, indicates he was very probably of foreign origin. He initially resided on the estate of the local landowner Sir Henry Bromley of Holt Castle, where he was first recorded as "belonging to Henry Bromley". By 1607, he had become Bromley's gardener.

Sir Henry Bromley had attended the Masque at the baptism of Prince Henry at Stirling Castle in August 1594 which featured a black actor.

Jetto wife's will refers to him as "Johnanes Jetto of Holt in the country of Worcestershire yeoman". According to biographer Onyeka Nubia, "Jetto's status as a yeoman is highly significant". Such a position would have afforded Jetto the privilege of voting in local elections (making Jetto the first African known to have this right in England) as well giving him much personal sway in local court cases. It also points towards Jetto's status as an independent and affluent black Briton, having risen from Bromley's employment to a senior position in the county's hierarchy, which required Jetto to hold no less than 40s worth of land.

Jetto composed his own will, and signed it on 20 September 1626. This document is an important source for Jetto's biography - showing his literacy and wealth. According to Onyeka, the document is also "very important as it was one of the few [documents] written by an African in early modern Europe", and in fact the first will to be written by an African in Europe. The will contains legacies bequeathed to Jetto's children, and grandchildren, totaling to £17 15s 8d. The will was executed on 13 September 1638.

== Family and death ==
Henry married Persida, "a maid". Unlike Henry, Persida's race is not recorded in contemporary records. Henry predeceased Persida, and was buried in St Martin's, Holt on 30 August 1627. Persida was buried on 7 July 1640.

Both Henry and Persida's wills mention their five children: Sarah, Margaret, John, Helena and Richard, all of whom were baptised in Holt between 1598 and 1608. Henry's will mentions one illegitimate child among his beneficiaries - "John the Cuthbert". Genealogical research has revealed 8 children, 32 grandchildren, and over 70 great-grandchildren descended from Jetto. Jetto's will contains a threat towards two of his more unruly children, Richard and Margaret, over their portions of the inheritance:

It is my will that if my sonne Richard and my daughter Margaret will not be ruled and doe after theyr mother's commandment for to have [...] 20, shillings a piece and no more and theyre portion to [the estates] [...] to their two sisters.

Jetto's descendants have been traced throughout England - in Birmingham, Bristol, Cheshire, Durham, Manchester, and Surrey - as well as in Australia and in the United States, though the ethnic connotations of the surname provoked later generations to change the name to "Jetter".

== Legacy ==
In speaking of people living in Tudor England we may think of Henry VIII and Elizabeth I, but we should know that Henrie Anthonie Jetto and Mary Fillis of Morisco: the Blackamoores, Shakespeare's other countrymen lived there too.

— Onyeka Nubia, "Black History Month in Retrospect"

Jetto was rediscovered in 2007 by a distant descendant, Martin Bluck, researching his family history in the Worcestershire History Centre when he discovered the records of Jetto's baptism and burial. The local newspaper Worcester News reported on the find as "the earliest known reference to a black person living in Worcestershire". In this news report the local archivist, Louisa Mann, described it as an "extremely exciting discovery":

Not only is it evidence that a black person was living in Worcestershire in the late 16th Century, but that he died a successful man whose family remained in Holt for generations to come.

Black British historian Onyeka Nubia undertook much genealogical research into Jetto. He interviewed the living descendants of Jetto on their ancestors, and discovered Jetto's will. In his 2013 book Blackamoores, Onyeka cites Jetto among several black Tudors, in an argument for their prevalence in English history; he reflected that Jetto's will was "one of the most important documents" in the book, remarkable as an early document composed by an African in Europe. In an Oxford Dictionary of National Biography release dedicated to expounding the new research on the "wide spectrum of people of African origin living in Britain across the sixteenth to eighteenth centuries", released in October 2019 for UK Black History Month, Jetto was among the 23 new black biographies added to the Dictionary. Onyeka authored Jetto's biography in the release.

== Sources ==
- Bourne, Rebecca (23 February 2007). "Ancestor was the first black person". Worcester News.
- Kaufmann, Miranda (2017). Black Tudors: The Untold Story (eBook ed.). Oneworld Publications. ISBN 978-1-78607-185-9.
- Ingram, Anders (17 October 2019). "Early black British history and the Oxford DNB". Oxford Dictionary of National Biography.
- Nubia, Onyeka (2016). Blackamoores: Africans in Tudor England, their Presence, Status and Origins (PDF) (PhD). University of East Anglia.
- Nubia, Onyeka (1 August 2017). "'Black History Month': in retrospect". Black History 365.
- Nubia, Onyeka (10 October 2019). "Jetto, Henrie Anthonie [Henry] (1569/70–1627)". Oxford Dictionary of National Biography (online ed.). Oxford University Press. (Subscription, Wikipedia Library access or UK public library membership required.)
