= John de Beauchamp, 2nd Baron Beauchamp =

John de Beauchamp, 2nd Baron Beauchamp may refer to:

- John de Beauchamp, 2nd Baron Beauchamp (first creation) (died 1343)
- John de Beauchamp, 2nd Baron Beauchamp (fourth creation) (1378–1420)
