= Holt, Worcestershire =

Village in Worcestershire, England

Coordinates: 52.261723°N 2.2509044°W

Holt
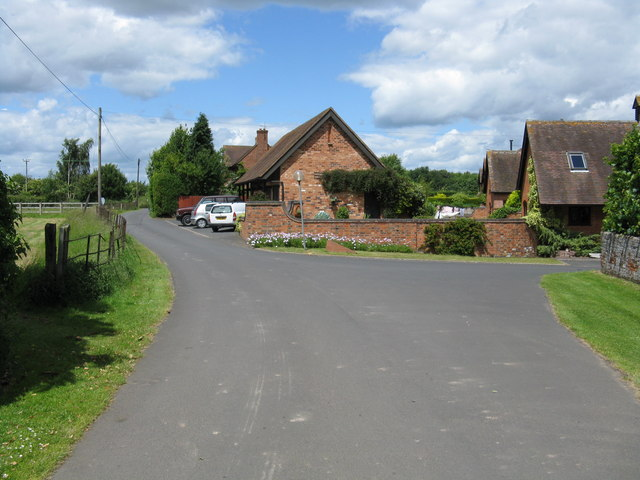
- Modern housing

- Location within Worcestershire
- OS grid reference: SO8262
- Civil parish: Holt
- District: Malvern Hills
- Shire county: Worcestershire
- Region: West Midlands
- Country: England
- Sovereign state: United Kingdom
- Police: West Mercia
- Fire: Hereford and Worcester
- Ambulance: West Midlands
- UK Parliament: West Worcestershire

Holt is a village and civil parish in the Malvern Hills District of the county of Worcestershire, England. The church is dedicated to St. Martin, and dates from about the 12th century. Holt Bridge, over the River Severn, was designed by Thomas Telford, and opened in 1830. Holt Parish Council website https://holt-worcestershire-pc.gov.uk

== History ==
=== Early history ===
Holt saw archaeological digs during the 1970s, in advance of gravel extraction. The oldest artefacts recovered were late Neolithic flints and pottery, possibly dating to about 2000 BC. Sherds of burial pottery from the Beaker period (c. 2000–1900 BC) were also found.

The bulk of the archaeological evidence related to the early British Bronze Age (c. 1700–1450 BC) in the form of traces of low barrows and enclosures with associated cremations. No dwellings were identified. In 1844 a bronze axe was found during dredging operations in the River Severn below the site of Holt Lock.

British Iron Age (1500 BC – 40 AD) finds have been scarce, although crop marks indicated farming activity and a rectangular enclosure was partly uncovered. A few pottery sherds from that period have been recovered at other times, along with an iron pin also from the area of Holt Lock.

There is some evidence of Roman occupation in neighbouring Little Witley, Shrawley and Grimley.

=== Saxon period ===
Worcestershire has one of the most complete and ancient collections of Anglo-Saxon charters that detail the grants of estates by the church and crown. Wick Episcopi was an area to the north-west of Worcester, roughly bounded by the rivers Severn and Teme and a line through Broadwas, Martley, Wichenford, Little Witley and Shrawley Brook, and thus included present-day Holt. The manors (later parishes) within Wick Episcopi where defined during that period. Beonot league (Bentley in today's Holt parish) was first recognised at that time. Other locations in Holt named in the Wick Episcopi grant of 775 include Heafuchrycg (Ockeridge), Doferic (Shrawley Brook), Saeferne (the Severn) and Baele Broc (Babbling Brook = Grimley Brook). Hallow, in 816, was one of the first single manors to be granted to a tenant lord by the Bishopric of Worcester. Prior to that it had been part of a larger estate, Worgorena league (the clearing of the people of Worcester), which also included Holt. The clearing concerned would have been in the southern portion of the still extensive but retreating Wyre Forest.

One of Alfred the Great's client kings, Burgred, granted Alhun (or Alhwine), Bishop of Worcester various favours in return for two gold armlets weighing 45 'mancuses'. The grant, in 855, included exempting three 'manentes' in Beonetlege (Bentley in Holt) from pasturing rights by the king's swine in an area called Fern Pasture.

In 962, with the consent of the king, Edgar, Bishop Oswald of Worcester let two 'mansae' at Beonetlaege (Bentley in Holt) to his thegn and minister Eadmaer. The grant described and defined the boundaries of the manors in terms of natural and man-made landscape features. Bentley's included references to Saeferne (the Severn), Baele (Babbling) Brook today known as Grimley Brook, Heafuc hrycge (Hawks Ridge/Ockeridge) and 'Dic in Doferic' (a boundary dike running to Shrawley Brook). Ball Mill on the Holt-Grimley parish boundary preserves a derivation of the name of Baele.

Bentley manor became known as Holte (Holt) by the time of Domesday, the original name is preserved in the form of Bentley Farm. Holt(e) means a copse in an otherwise cleared area. Possibly when Bentley manor was granted in two parts the eastern portion was separately identified by the name Holte, which later came to represent the whole manor or parish. Eadmaer received a further grant in 969 when he took on an additional four 'mansi', or hides, at Witleah (Little Witley). The boundaries included all of Witley and the remaining portion of Bentley, probably in the area of Ockeridge Wood. This association of the two manors was repeated on subsequent grants.

In 1017 Archbishop Wulfstan of Worcester granted the six hide Beonetleah (Bentley in Holt) with Witley manor to his brother, Aelfwige.

=== Norman period ===
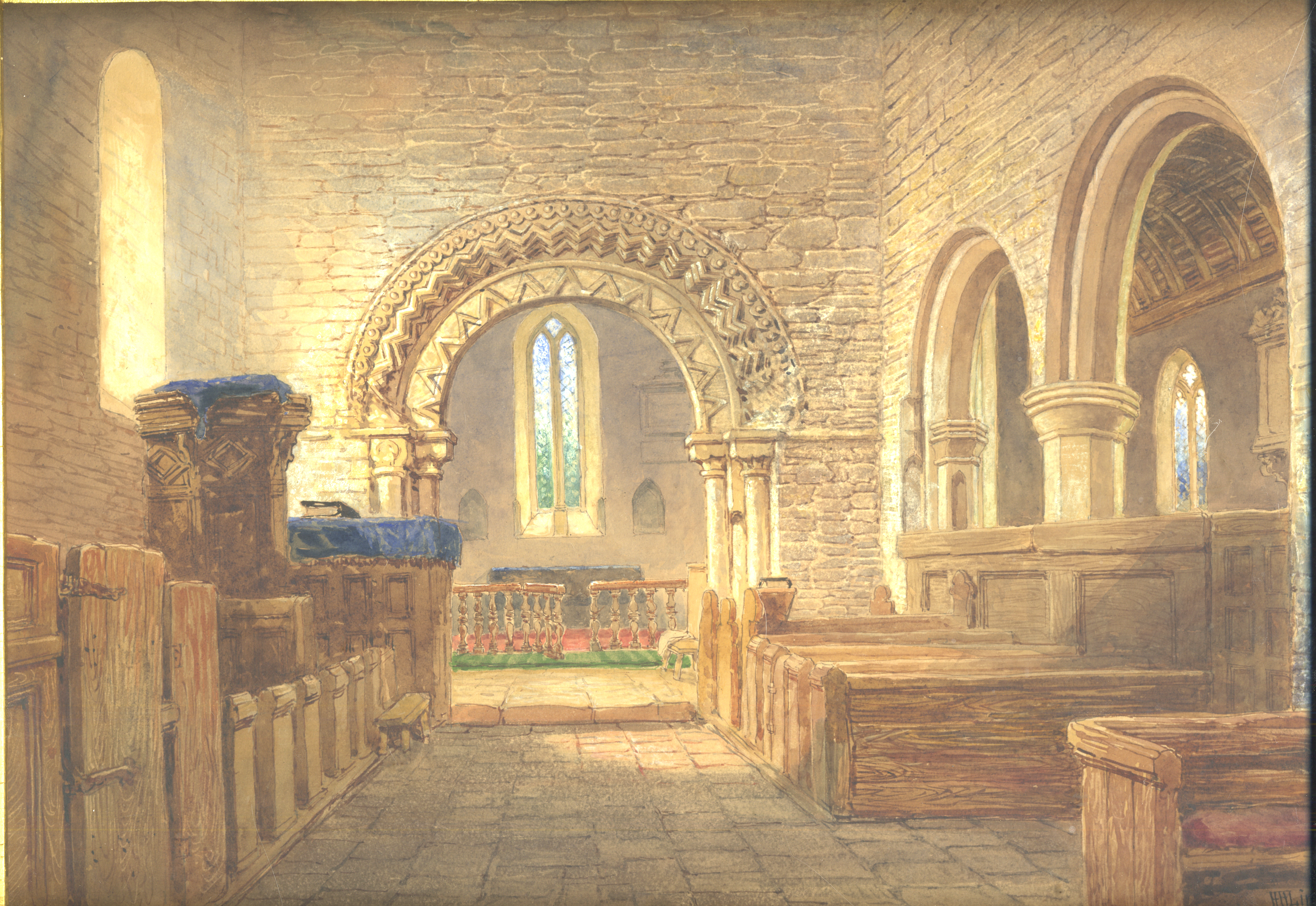
St Martin's Church in 1879, by Henry Harris Lines

The manor of Holt is listed in the Domesday Book of 1086 when it was held by Urse d'Abetot (c.1040-1108), first feudal baron of Salwarpe in Worcestershire, Sheriff of Worcestershire in about 1069. His estate there consisted of 5 hides (about 600 acres) with two ploughs (probably 8 oxen per team). There were 12 villagers and 24 smallholders with an additional 10 ploughs. A 12-acre (4.9 ha) meadow and a woodland half a league square (c. 1440 acres) were also in the manor. A hedged enclosure was noted; this would have been for the capture of game such as deer and wild boar. A fishery (on the Severn presumably) was worth 5 shillings and a salt house in Droitwich 13 pence. The total value was £6.

After the Norman Conquest the new manorial lords quickly went about putting their physical mark on the landscape. This generally took the form of rebuilding the parish churches in the Norman architecture style. In Holt church the earliest architectural feature, an opening in the bell tower wall, was possibly constructed within ten years of the conquest. It bears Saxon characteristics and probably reflects the use of native stonemasons by the Norman lord. The nave was constructed about 1100 to 1110, and the chancel arch in 1120. The same mason appears to have carved the font and the arch. The rest of the structure of the building dates from periods in the fourteenth and fifteenth centuries, as do some of the memorials and leaded windows. In 1113 Holt was still a chapelry of St Helen's in Worcester.

A medieval deer park situated immediately to the south of Holt church may have pre-dated the Norman Conquest.

=== Medieval period ===
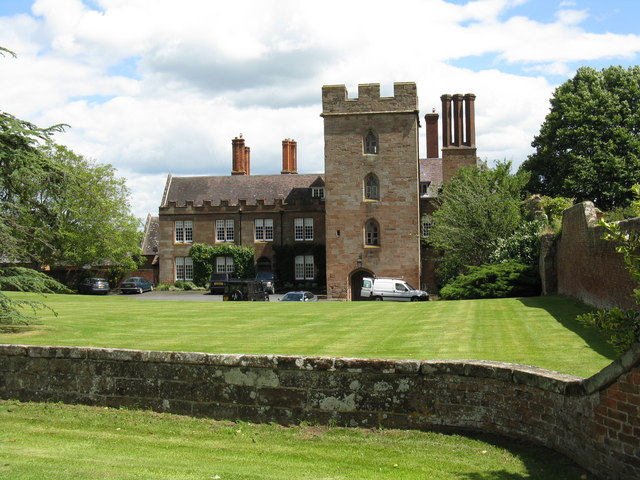
Holt Castle

Arms of Beauchamp of Holt: Gules, a fess between six billets or, a difference of the senior line of Beauchamp of Elmley, Earl of Warwick

Holt manor passed to the Beauchamp family when Emeline d'Abetot, the daughter and eventual heiress of Urse, married Walter de Beauchamp of Elmley Castle, 12 miles south-east of Worcester. Holt was then held by successive Beauchamps, who in 1268 inherited the title Earl of Warwick with Warwick Castle, one of the most powerful earldoms in the country. Holt became the seat of John de Beauchamp (d.1297), a younger brother of the first Beauchamp Earl of Warwick. John's great-grandson was John de Beauchamp, 1st Baron Beauchamp (1319–1388) "of Kidderminster", seated at Holt Castle, who obtained a royal grant to hold a fair at 'Le Rode' in his manor of Holt, to be held annually on the Feast of St. Mary Magdalene (22 July). The 1st Baron was impeached by the Merciless Parliament on 12 March 1388 and was executed on Tower Hill, London, on 12 May the same year.

At the time of his death he held manors, estates and properties throughout the Midland shires and beyond, but Holt remained his principal seat. It is thought he was the builder of Holt Castle. The only surviving original part of his building is the square tower which dominates the west (entrance) front, with fifteenth and sixteenth century additions behind.

On the execution of the 1st Baron, Parliament expropriated all his lands and possessions and leased them out to various parties. Holt was obtained by his distant cousin Thomas de Beauchamp, 12th Earl of Warwick. In 1398 Parliament reversed its earlier decision and returned all his father's lands and title to Thomas's son John de Beauchamp (1378–1420), who died without male heir. At that time his estates included the manors of Holt and Hanley, near Tenbury, four more in Warwickshire, fish-weirs and fisheries in Ombersley and several properties in the city of Worcester. In the absence of a male heir the barony became extinct. His heir was Margaret de Beauchamp, his twenty-year-old daughter, but the manor of Holt was split into three parts, each following a different female line of descent. Margaret de Beauchamp married firstly John Pauncefoot and secondly John Wyshaw, who in 1428 was holding the manor in her right.

The deer park was enclosed following the death of the 1st Baron.

Following the division of the manor of Holt in 1420, over 150 years passed before the manor was recombined following a series of complex transactions between Sir John Bourne, Anthony Bourne, Thomas Fortescue, John and Martin Crofts and Sir Thomas Bromley.

=== Early modern ===
Sir Thomas' eldest son, Sir Henry Bromley was born in Holt Castle. Sir Henry inherited all his father's lands except the family seat at Holt Castle, which was held by his widowed mother for her life.

In 1596 an adult African servant of Henry Bromley was baptised at St Martin's Church and given the name Henry Jetto. He is known to have worked as a gardener at Holt Castle, where the gardens now comprise two terraces overlooking the river Severn.

In February 1601 Sir Henry was implicated for his involvement with the Essex Rebellion, and his lands, including Holt Castle, were forfeited and he was briefly imprisoned. Upon the accession of James I in 1603 these lands were returned to him, and he proceeded to show King James his full loyalty. Nine years later Sir Henry reunited the final portion of Holt manor. As a magistrate Henry Bromley had rounded up the Jesuit priests Henry Garnet and Edward Oldcorne, the last wanted men in the Gunpowder Plot, at Hindlip on the outskirts of Worcester in 1606. Garnet and Oldcorne were held for a time in Holt Castle.

=== Modern ===
Sir Henry Bromley married four times, lastly to Anne Beswicke who erected a monument in the chancel of Holt Church to her husband who died 1615. In 1750 Sir Henry's descendants sold Holt manor to Thomas Foley, 2nd Baron Foley of Witley Court, Great Witley. In 1837 the Foleys sold off the Witley & Holt estates to realise capital which was needed to pay off heavy debts incurred by the 2nd Baron, a reckless gambler. The purchasers were the trustees of William Ward, 1st Earl of Dudley (1817–1885). The estate was finally broken up in 1920 when the 2nd Earl moved on after his first wife's death.

== Notable people ==
- Edmunds Pytts M.P. and his wife, the Dowager Countess of Coventry were buried St Martin's Church, Holt.

== See also ==
- Holt Heath, Worcestershire
