= John Beauchamp, 3rd Baron Beauchamp of Somerset =

English peer

Arms of Beauchamp of Hatch: Vair, as blazoned on the Collins Roll. These arms suggest that the family of Beauchamp of Hatch was unrelated to the family of Beauchamp, Earls of Warwick from 1267, which bore arms: Gules, a fesse between six cross crosslets or

John de Beauchamp, 3rd Baron Beauchamp de Somerset (20 January 1329 – 8 October 1361) was an English peer.

== Origins ==
He was born at Stoke-sub-Hamdon in Somerset, the eldest son and heir of John de Beauchamp, 2nd Baron Beauchamp of Hatch Beauchamp in Somerset by his wife Margaret St. John.

== Career ==
He was Warden of the Cinque Ports from 1359 to about 1361. King Edward III issued a commission to Beauchamp from 1359 to act as Warden and Keeper of the Ports of Kent. In 1359 he participated in the expedition to Gascony by King Edward III. In 1360 he was appointed Admiral of the Fleet.

== Marriage ==
He married Lady Alice Beauchamp, daughter of Sir Thomas de Beauchamp, 11th Earl of Warwick (who was no relation to the Beauchamp family of Hatch) by his wife Katherine Mortimer. The marriage was without progeny.

Political offices
Preceded by The Earl of Dunbar and March	Lord Warden of the Cinque Ports; 1359–1361	Succeeded by Sir Robert de Herle
Peerage of England
Preceded by Baron Beauchamp	Baron Beauchamp of Somerset; 1343–1361	Abeyant
