= John Beauchamp, 1st Baron Beauchamp of Somerset =

Arms of Beauchamp of Hatch: Vair. These arms suggest that the family of Beauchamp of Hatch was unrelated to the family of Beauchamp, Earl of Warwick from 1267, which bore arms: Gules, a fesse between six cross crosslets or

John de Beauchamp, 1st Baron Beauchamp "de Somerset" (25 July 1274 – October/December 1336), was feudal baron of Hatch Beauchamp in Somerset. He fought in the wars in Scotland and was a signatory of the Baron's Letter to Pope Boniface VIII in 1301.

== Origins ==
He was born on 25 July 1274, the son and heir of John de Beauchamp (died 1283), feudal baron of Hatch, seated at Hatch Beauchamp in Somerset, by his wife Cicely de Vivonne/de Forz (died 1320), one of the four daughters and co-heiresses of William de Vivonne/de Forz (died 1259), who had held a half share of the feudal barony of Curry Mallet in Somerset. Cicely thus inherited a one-eighth share of the barony of Curry Malet.

== Career ==
In 1299 he was created by writ Baron Beauchamp "de Somerset".

== Marriage and children ==
At some time before 1301 he married Joan Chenduit, by whom he had issue including:

- John de Beauchamp, 2nd Baron Beauchamp (1304–1343), eldest son and heir;
- William de Beauchamp;
- Joan de Beauchamp, wife of John de Cobham, 2nd Baron Cobham (d. 1355), of Cobham, Kent;
- Alienor de Beauchamp;
- Beatrice de Beauchamp.

== Death ==
He died between October and December 1336.

Peerage of England
New creation	Baron Beauchamp of Somerset; 1299–1336	Succeeded by John de Beauchamp
