= Miranda Kaufmann =

British historian, journalist and educator (born 1982)

Miranda Kaufmann FRHistS FRSA
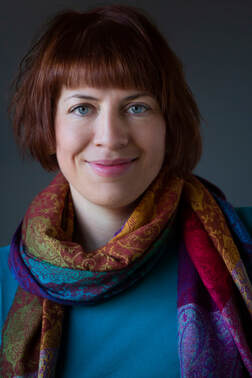
- Born: Miranda Clare Kaufmann; 1982 (age 43–44); London, England
- Occupations: Historian, journalist and educator

Academic background
- Education: Christ Church, Oxford
- Thesis: Africans in Britain, 1500-1640 (2011)
- Doctoral advisor: Nicholas Davidson; Clive Holmes

Academic work
- Discipline: Historian
- Sub-discipline: Role of Black Britons in Tudor society
- Notable works: Black Tudors: The Untold Story (2017) "Heiresses: The Caribbean Marriage Trade" (2025)
- Website: www.mirandakaufmann.com

Miranda Clare Kaufmann (born 1982) is a British historian, journalist and educator, whose work has focused on Black British history. She is the author of the 2017 book Black Tudors: The Untold Story, which was shortlisted for the 2018 Nayef Al-Rodhan Prize and the Wolfson History Prize. She is a senior research fellow at the Institute of Commonwealth Studies (part of the School of Advanced Study at the University of London), where since 2014 she has co-convened the workshop series "What's Happening in Black British History?" with Michael Ohajuru.

== Biography ==
Miranda Kaufmann was born in 1982 to a Jewish family in London, about which she has said: "I think it gave me an international outlook and curiosity about other people and cultures. It was also a hugely intellectually stimulating place to grow up. I benefited from all the museums, galleries and theatres; and just walking down a London street is often a history lesson in itself. She read history at Christ Church, Oxford, becoming interested in Black history as a research topic during her final undergraduate year, and going on to complete in 2011 her doctoral thesis entitled "Africans in Britain, 1500–1640".

Since 2014, Kaufmann has been co-convenor, together with art and cultural historian Michael Ohajuru, of the workshop series "What's Happening in Black British History?" at the Institute of Commonwealth Studies. Kaufmann along with Stephen B. Whatley inspired the "John Blanke Project", an art and archive initiative of which Ohajuru is the founder and director; the Project celebrates and is linked to images of John Blanke, the Black trumpeter to the courts of Henry VII and Henry VIII.

Kaufmann has written articles for a range of publications, including The Times Literary Supplement, The Times, The Guardian, and BBC History magazine, has contributed to features about Black British History on radio, television and video, as well as appearing on Sky News, Al Jazeera and BBC Television. Additionally, Kaufmann has participated in and spoken at many educational institutions, conferences, festivals and seminars internationally. She advised on the Tudor episode of David Olusoga's 2016 BBC Television documentary series Black and British: A Forgotten History.

Her first book, Black Tudors: The Untold Story, was published in 2017 by Oneworld Publications. As Bidisha observed in The Guardian, the book "debunks the idea that slavery was the beginning of Africans’ presence in England, and exploitation and discrimination their only experience. [...], in line with her drive to teach young people information outside the curriculum. Along with writers such as David Olusoga, Paul Gilroy and Sunny Singh, and institutions such as the University of York, which has launched a project investigating medieval multiculturalism, historians such as Miranda Kaufmann are bringing England to a necessary reckoning with its true history." Black Tudors was shortlisted for the 2018 Nayef Al-Rodhan Prize for Global Cultural Understanding and for the Wolfson History Prize, and was also nominated as "Book of the Year" by the Evening Standard and The Observer.

Her next book, Heiresses: Marriage, Inheritance and Caribbean Slavery, was published in 2025.

Kaufmann is an Honorary Fellow of the University of Liverpool, a Fellow of the Royal Historical Society and of the Royal Society of Arts.

== Books ==
- Black Tudors: The Untold Story, Oneworld, 2017, hardback ISBN 9781786071842; paperback ISBN 9781786073969.
- Heiresses: The Caribbean Marriage Trade, Oneworld, 2025, ISBN 9780861548019.

== See also ==
- Blackamoores
