= Holt Castle, Worcestershire =

Country house in Worcestershire, England

Holt Castle
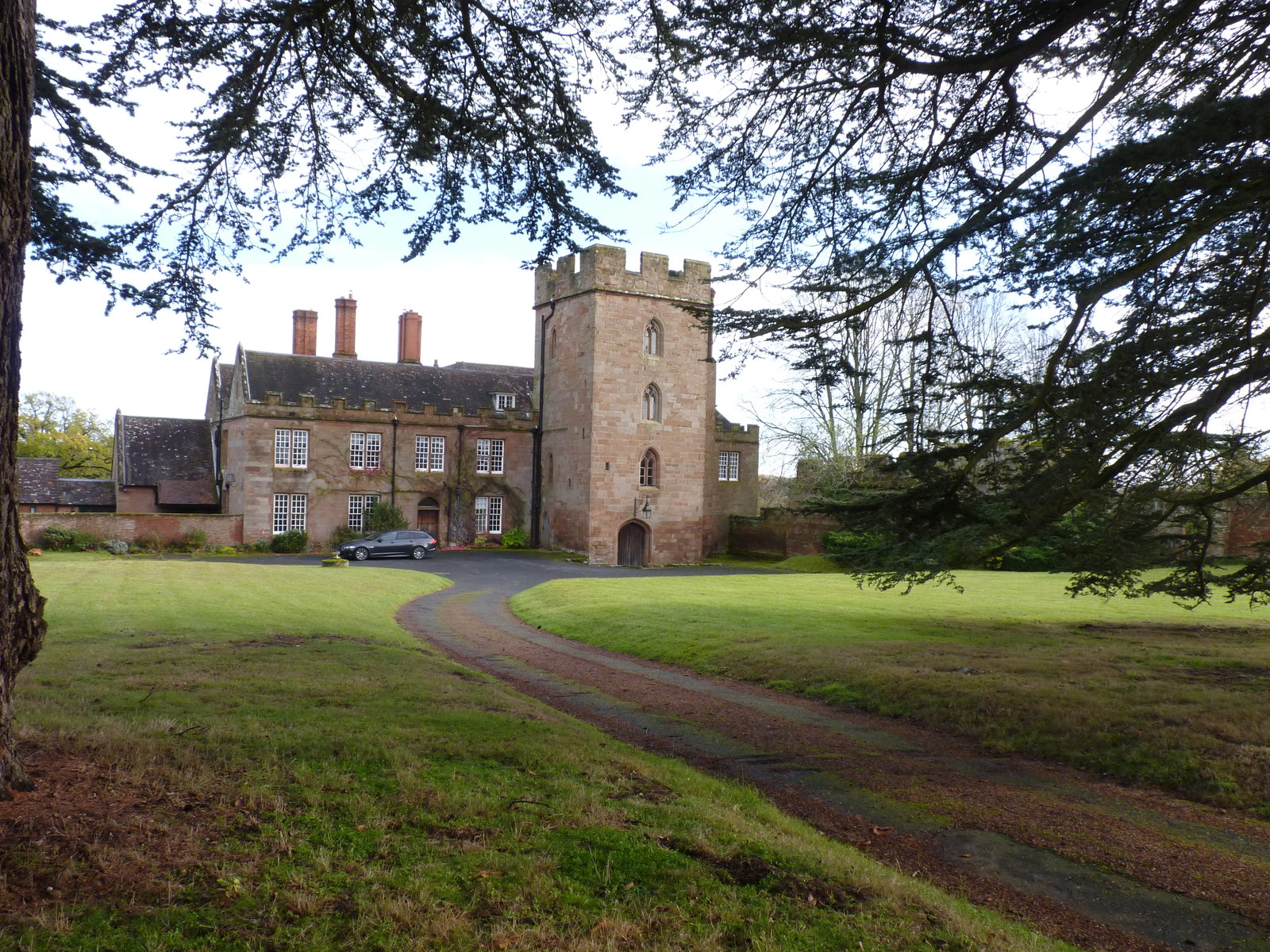

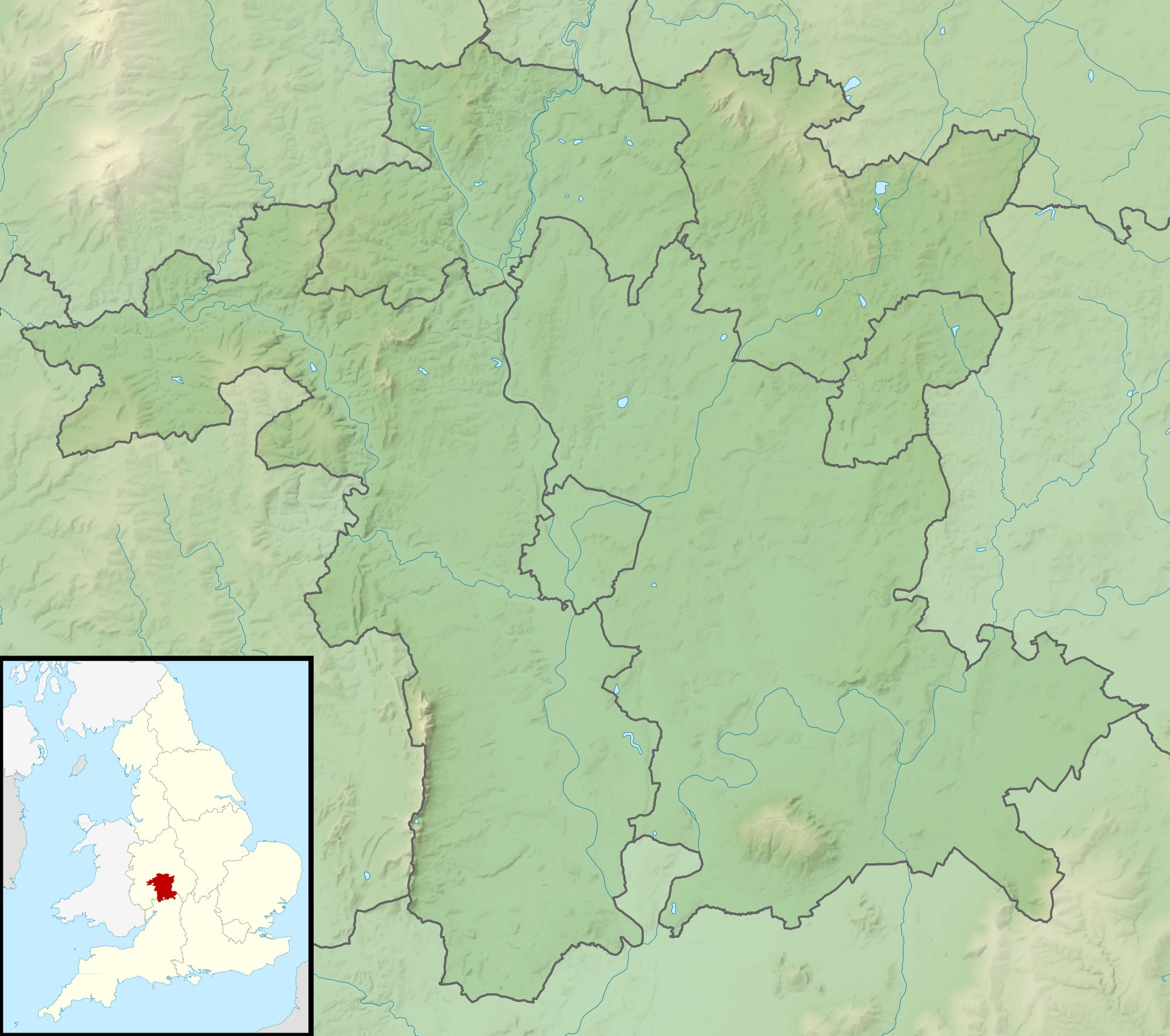
- Location within Worcestershire
- 52.261°N 2.2496°W
- Type: House
- Location: Holt, Worcestershire

Listed Building – Grade I
- Official name: Holt Castle
- Designated: 12 November 1951
- Reference no.: 1082922

Listed Building – Grade II
- Official name: Fortification wall adjoining Holt Castle at south-west corner
- Designated: 15 October 1984
- Reference no.: 1301930

Listed Building – Grade II
- Official name: Retaining wall 60 yards east and Terracing 80 yards south-east of Holt Castle
- Designated: 15 October 1984
- Reference no.: 1349338

Listed Building – Grade II
- Official name: Game Store 18 yards west of Holt Castle
- Designated: 15 October 1984
- Reference no.: 1301927

Holt Castle is a country house in Holt, Worcestershire, England. It is a Grade I listed building.

== History ==
The Domesday Book records the manor of Holt as being in the possession Urse d'Abetot, a Norman knight who came to England as an important follower of William the Conqueror and was made Sheriff of Worcester in around 1069. (Note: Urse d'Abetot displayed a capacity for greed and avarice notable even by the standards of the Norman invaders. His repeated efforts to appropriate church lands saw him cursed by his great rival in the west of England, Wulfstan, Bishop of Worcester.) D'Abetot constructed a castle at Holt in around 1086. Nothing of this early castle remains. The oldest portion of the present building is the main central tower, dating from the 14th century. This was likely built by John Beauchamp, 1st Baron Beauchamp of Kidderminster who was executed for treason in 1388. In the very early 17th century, Henry Jetto is recorded as living as a servant at the castle, the first known instance of a black man resident in Worcestershire. Jetto's will and testament is the earliest such document authored by an African in the United Kingdom.

Further developments to the castle occurred in the 16th, 18th and 19th centuries, at which point it had passed into the ownership of the Ward family, Earls of Dudley, whose principal residence was the nearby Witley Court. By the 20th century, the castle had been sold, and in the 21st it remains a private residence, that has served as a wedding and events venue.

== Architecture and description ==
The castle's central tower is square, of four storeys, with a castellated parapet. It is roughly 16 ft. by 14 ft. in diameter, with walls to a thickness of four ft. at the base. The main building material is local sandstone rubble. To the east, stands a large great hall of the 16th century, although with some earlier elements. In the 19th century, a joined service wing was added to the north. Terraced gardens to the east of the house overlook the River Severn, and date from the 18th century, although it is possible they replicate an earlier layout.

Holt Castle is a Grade I listed building. Two sections of walling, one of Medieval date, and the other of the 18th century, and a game larder, are listed at Grade II.

== Gallery ==
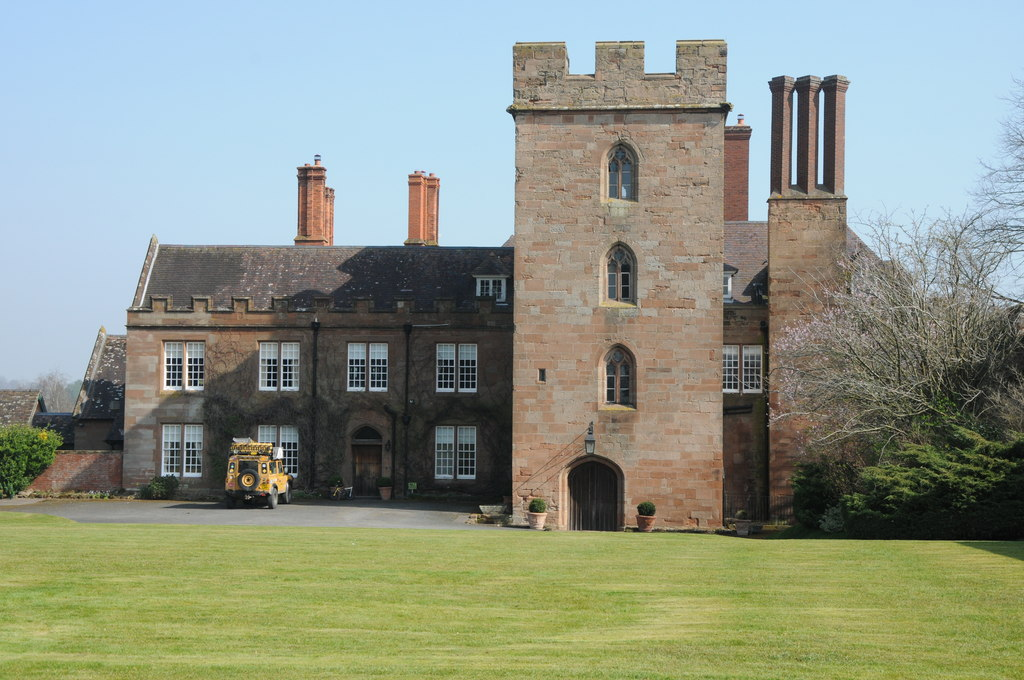
The entrance front

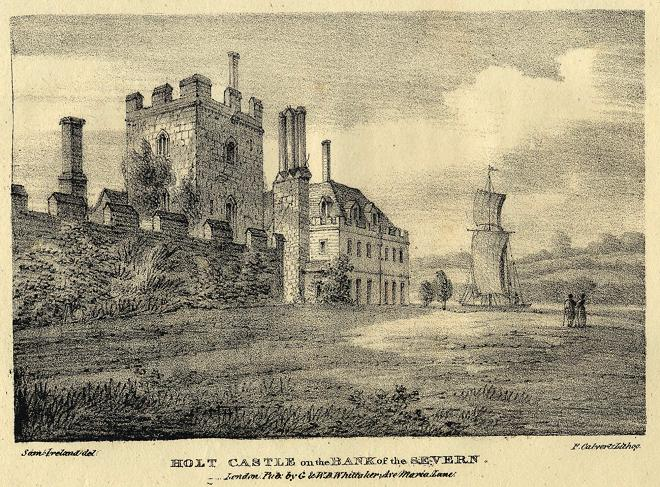
A 19th-century view of the castle

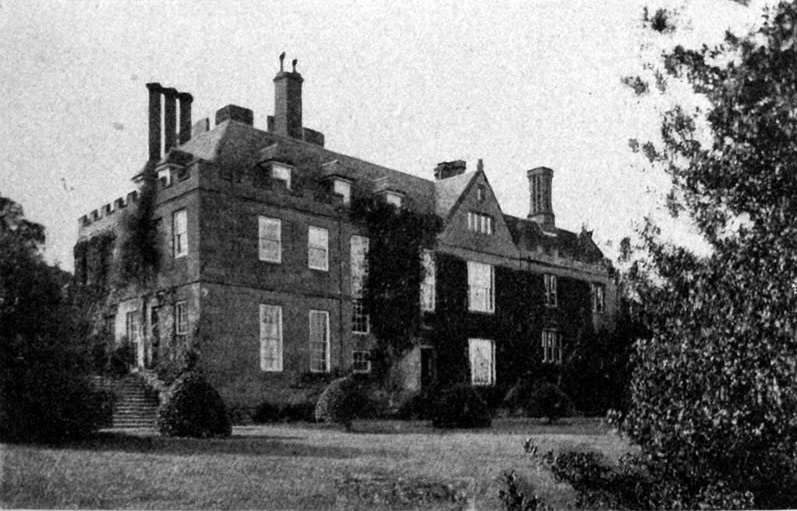
The castle in the early 20th century

== Sources ==
- Brooks, Alan; Pevsner, Nikolaus (2007). Worcestershire. The Buildings of England. Yale University Press. ISBN 978-0-300-11298-6.
- Chibnall, Marjorie (1986). Anglo-Norman England 1066–1166. Oxford, UK: Blackwell Publishers. ISBN 978-0-631-13234-9. OCLC 59244177.
- Keats-Rohan, Katharine S. B. (1999). Domesday People: A Prosopography of Persons Occurring in English Documents, 1066–1166: Domesday Book. Ipswich, UK: Boydell Press. ISBN 978-0-851-15722-1. OCLC 491828524.
- Nubia, Onyeka (2019). "Jetto, Henrie Anthonie [Henry] (1569/70–1627)". Oxford Dictionary of National Biography. Oxford, UK. doi:10.1093/odnb/9780198614128.013.112805.
- Willis-Bund, John William; Page, William Henry (1913). Worcestershire. Victoria County History. Vol. 3. London: Constable & Co. OCLC 927033296.
