= Robert de Beauchamp =

Robert de Beauchamp (died 1252) was an English judge, was a minor at the death of his father, Robert de Beauchamp, feudal baron of Hatch Beauchamp, Somerset, in 1211–12. Adhering to John, he was appointed constable of Oxford and sheriff of the county towards the close of 1215, and received grants of land for his services to the king. He was raised to the bench by Henry III on 6 July 1234, and appointed a justice itinerant in August 1234 and April 1238. He last appeared as a judge in 1241–2, and died shortly before 1 February 1251–2, when his son did homage for his lands.
