= Church of St John the Baptist, Hatch Beauchamp =

Church in Somerset, England

Church of St John the Baptist
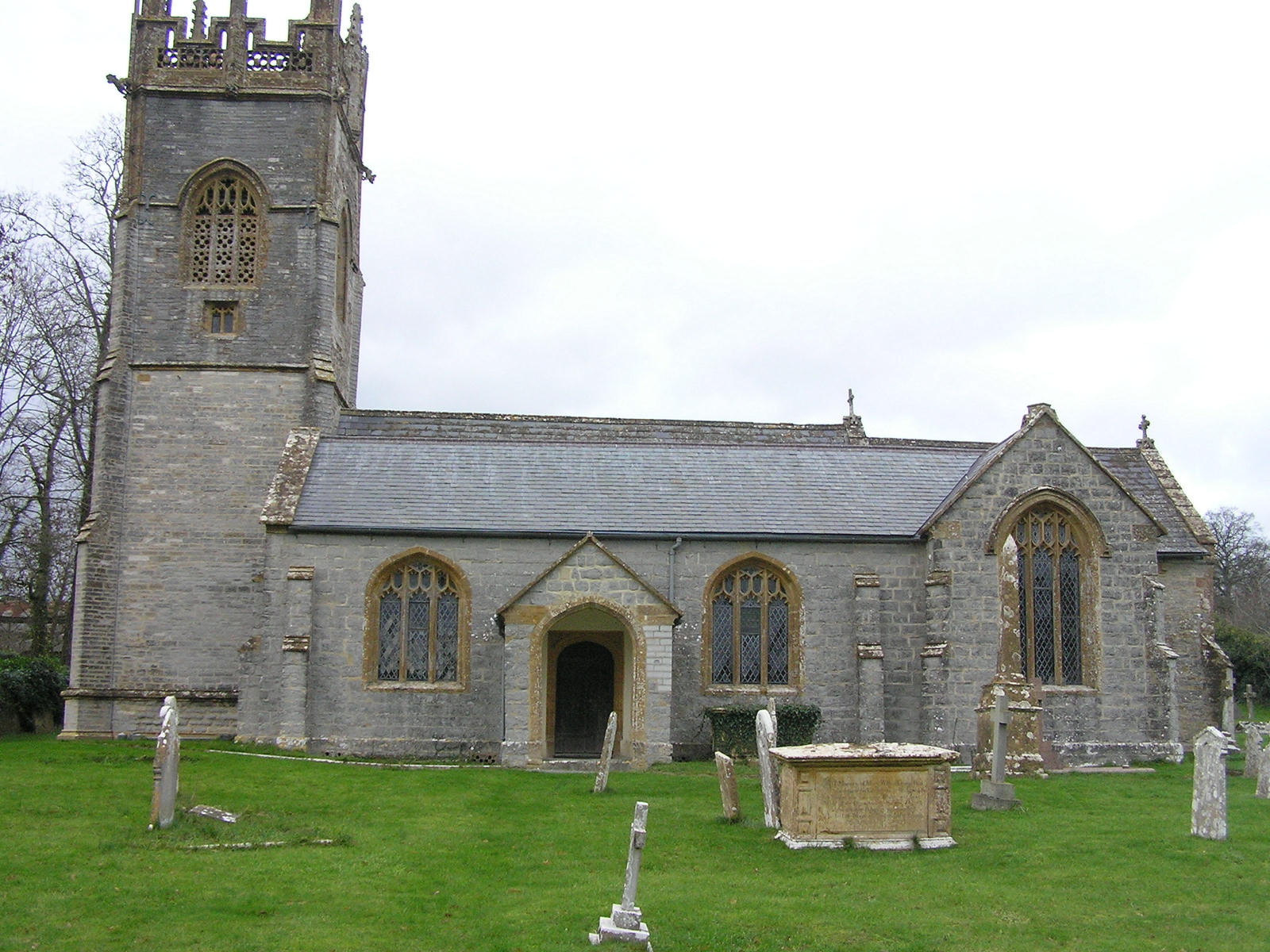

- Location within Somerset

General information
- Location: Hatch Beauchamp, England
- Coordinates: 50.9856°N 2.9902°W

The Church of St John the Baptist in Hatch Beauchamp, Somerset, England, was built in the Norman period and has been designated as a Grade I listed building.

The church has a crenellated 3-stage tower from about 1500. It displays crocketed pinnacles, a pierced parapet with quatrefoils and arcades in the merlons and gargoyles. The church has diagonal buttresses to support the tower whereas, in other churches, angle buttresses are the norm. The buttresses, which finish in the belfry stage, support small detached shafts which rise upwards to form the outside subsidiary pinnacles of each corner cluster. On the stonework are hunky punks of dogs. The church was restored in the 19th century with extra bays being added to the north and south aisles by George Gilbert Scott in 1867.

The church includes a window dedicated to the memory of Colonel John Rouse Merriott Chard (1847–1897) who was an English soldier who won the Victoria Cross for his role in the defence of Rorke's Drift in 1879.

It is a church within the Seven Sowers benefice which includes Curry Mallet, Beercrocombe, Orchard Portman, Staple Fitzpaine, Stoke St Mary (with Thurlbear) and West Hatch. It is within the archdeanery of Taunton.

== See also ==
- List of Grade I listed buildings in Taunton Deane
- List of towers in Somerset
- List of ecclesiastical parishes in the Diocese of Bath and Wells
