= Baron Beauchamp =

Extinct barony in the Peerage of England

Map showing seats of the Beauchamp family in Worcestershire and Warwickshire. Elmley Castle (held from the Bishops of Worcester) was their origin, pre-1133, and became the caput of their feudal barony of Salwarpe, inherited from Urse d'Abetot, with the hereditary offices of Sheriff of Worcestershire and Constable of Worcester Castle. The senior line moved to Warwick Castle in 1268, when younger brothers of the first Beauchamp Earl of Warwick established junior branches at Powick and Holt, ancient possessions of the family. Alcester and Bletsoe (in Bedfordshire) were later acquired by the Powick branch. The title Baron Beauchamp "of Kidderminster" was acquired by the Holt branch

The titles Baron Beauchamp and Viscount Beauchamp have been created several times throughout English and British history. There is an extant Viscountcy of Beauchamp, held by the Seymour family, Marquesses of Hertford.

== Beauchamp family ==
The name Beauchamp (French "beautiful/fair field"), Latinised to de Bello Campo ("from the beautiful/fair field" or "from the fair battlefield"), is borne by one of the most ancient Anglo-Norman families which settled in England during the Norman Conquest of 1066. The three main lines of the Beauchamp family were the Bedfordshire, the Somerset, and the Worcestershire branches. The Bedfordshire branch died out in the male line after only two generations. The heir of the Somerset branch was the powerful Seymour family, whilst the Worcestershire branch achieved the greatest power and prominence as Earls of Warwick.

=== Barons Beauchamp, first creation ("de Somerset") (1299–1361) ===
Arms of Beauchamp of Hatch: Vair

(Descendants of the feudal barons of Hatch Beauchamp in Somerset)

- John de Beauchamp, 1st Baron Beauchamp (1274–1336)
- John de Beauchamp, 2nd Baron Beauchamp (d. 1343)
- John de Beauchamp, 3rd Baron Beauchamp (1330–1361) (abeyant on his death)

The barony was unsuccessfully claimed in 1924 by Ulric Oliver Thynne.

=== Baron Beauchamp, second creation ("de Warwick") (1350–1360) ===
Arms of Beauchamp of Elmley Castle, Earls of Warwick: Gules, a fesse between six cross crosslets or

- John Beauchamp, 1st Baron Beauchamp of Warwick (1316–1360)

=== Baron Beauchamp, third creation ("of Bletso") (1363–1380) ===
Arms of Beauchamp of Bletsoe and Powicke: Gules, a fess between six martlets or

- Roger Beauchamp, 1st Baron Beauchamp of Bletso (died 1380)
  - Sir Roger Beauchamp (died c. 1374)
- Sir Roger Beauchamp, de jure 2nd Baron Beauchamp of Bletso (d. 3 May 1406)
- Sir John Beauchamp, de jure 3rd Baron Beauchamp of Bletso (d. 1412–1414)

=== Barons Beauchamp, fourth creation ("of Kidderminster") (1387–1400) ===
Arms of Beauchamp of Holt: Gules, a fess between six billets or

This was the first barony created by letters patent, by King Richard II in 1387. They were seated at Holt Castle, Worcestershire, a junior branch of the senior Elmley line.

- John de Beauchamp, 1st Baron Beauchamp (1319–1388) (forfeit 1388)
- John de Beauchamp, 2nd Baron Beauchamp (1378–1420) (attainder reversed 1398; forfeit in 1400 by renewal of attainder)

=== Barons Beauchamp, fifth creation ("of Powick") (1447–1503) ===
Descended from Walter de Beauchamp (died 1303/6) of Beauchamp's Court, Alcester in Warwickshire and of Beauchamp Court, Powick in Worcestershire, Steward of the Household to King Edward I and younger brother of William de Beauchamp, 9th Earl of Warwick (c.1238-1298), the first of his family to hold that title (inherited from their mother).

- John Beauchamp, 1st Baron Beauchamp (d. 1475) (great-great grandson of Walter de Beauchamp (died 1303/6))
- Richard Beauchamp, 2nd Baron Beauchamp (1435–1503)

== Seymour family ==
Arms of Seymour: Gules, two wings conjoined in lure or

=== Viscount Beauchamp, first creation ("of Hache") (1536–1552) ===
The Seymour family inherited the capital manor of Hatch Beauchamp (anciently Hache) due to the marriage of Roger Seymour (d. c. 1361) to Cecily Beauchamp (d. 1393), the aunt and heiress of John IV de Beauchamp, 3rd Baron Beauchamp (1330–1361), feudal baron of Hatch Beauchamp.

- Edward Seymour, Viscount Beauchamp (created Earl of Hertford in 1537 and Duke of Somerset in 1547; forfeit in 1552)

=== Barons Beauchamp, sixth creation ("of Hache") (1559–1750) ===
- Edward Seymour, 1st Earl of Hertford and Baron Beauchamp (1539–1621)
  - Edward Seymour, styled Lord Beauchamp (1561–1612)
- William Seymour, 2nd Duke of Somerset, 2nd Earl of Hertford and Baron Beauchamp (1588–1660)
- William Seymour, 3rd Duke of Somerset, 3rd Earl of Hertford and Baron Beauchamp (1652–1671)
- John Seymour, 4th Duke of Somerset, 4th Earl of Hertford and Baron Beauchamp (1646–1675)
- Francis Seymour, 5th Duke of Somerset, 5th Earl of Hertford and Baron Beauchamp (1658–1678)
- Charles Seymour, 6th Duke of Somerset, 6th Earl of Hertford and Baron Beauchamp (1662–1748)
- Algernon Seymour, 7th Duke of Somerset, 7th Earl of Hertford and Baron Beauchamp (1684–1750)

The Barony became extinct on the 7th Duke's death.

=== Viscounts Beauchamp, second creation ("of Hache") (from 1750) ===
- Francis Seymour-Conway, 1st Earl of Hertford, 1st Viscount Beauchamp (1718–1794) (created Marquess of Hertford in 1793)

See Marquess of Hertford for further Viscounts Beauchamp.

== Lygon family ==
Arms of Lygon: Argent, two lions passant double-queued gules

=== Barons Beauchamp, seventh creation ("of Powyke") (1806–1979) ===
- William Lygon, 1st Baron Beauchamp (1747–1816) (created Earl Beauchamp in 1815)

See Earl Beauchamp for descents.

== See also ==
- Beauchamp baronets
