= John Beauchamp, 2nd Baron Beauchamp of Somerset =

English peer (1304–1343)

Arms of Beauchamp of Hatch: Vair, as blazoned on the Collins Roll. These arms suggest that the family of Beauchamp of Hatch was unrelated to the family of Beauchamp, Earls of Warwick from 1267, which bore arms: Gules, a fesse between six cross crosslets or.

John de Beauchamp, 2nd Baron Beauchamp of Somerset (4 October 1304 – 19 May 1343) was an English peer and was feudal baron of Hatch Beauchamp in Somerset.

== Early life and family ==
He was born at Stoke-sub-Hamdon, Somersetshire, England, the eldest son and heir of Sir John de Beauchamp, 1st Baron Beauchamp of Somerset (1274–1336), feudal baron of Hatch, by his wife Joan Chenduit.

== Marriage and children ==
He married Margaret St John, the daughter of John St John, 1st Baron St John of Basing, Hampshire and his wife Isabel Courtenay. By Margaret, Beauchamp had three sons and three daughters:

- John de Beauchamp, 3rd Baron Beauchamp of Somerset (20 January 1329/1330 – 8 October 1361), who married Alice Beauchamp
- Edward de Beauchamp (born c. 1330)
- William de Beauchamp (born c. 1331)
- Eleanor de Beauchamp (c. 1327 – 13 June 1391), who married three times: to John Blount, John de Meriet and Henry Lunet
- Cicely de Beauchamp (c. 1321 – 7 June 1394) who inherited the manors of Hatch Beauchamp, Shepton Beauchamp, Merryfield, Ilton and one third of the manor of Shepton Mallet, Somerset, the manors of Boultbery and Harberton, Devon, of Dorton, Buckinghamshire, and of Little Haw, Suffolk. She married twice: to Sir Roger St. Maur (alias Seymour), and on 14 September 1368, to Sir Richard Tuberville (or Sir Gilbert Turberville) of Coity Castle, Glamorgan.
- Margaret de Beauchamp (born c. 1326)

Peerage of England
Preceded by John Beauchamp	Baron Beauchamp of Somerset; 1336–1363	Succeeded by John Beauchamp
