= Stephen B. Whatley =

English painter (born 1965)

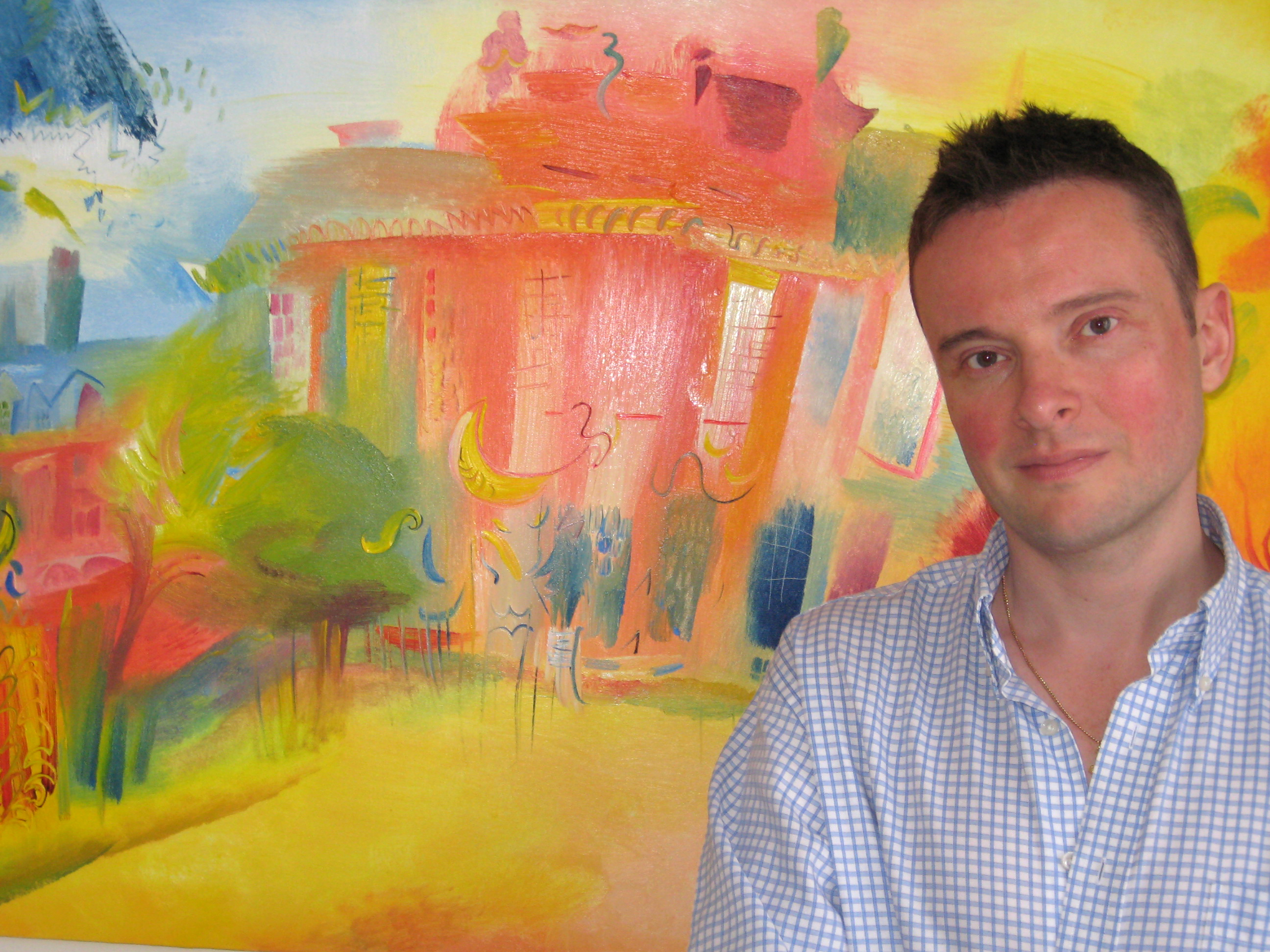
- Whatley in 2007 in front of "The Sleeping Beauty Beyond The Wall: Kensington Palace" (Oil, 2002)
- Born: 22 July 1965 (age 61); London, England
- Education: Ipswich School of Art (1981–1983); Norwich School of Art (1983–1986; BA); University of London (1986–1987; PGCE)
- Occupation: Painter
- Known for: Painting
- Movement: Expressionism
- Website: www.stephenbwhatley.com

Stephen Beckett Whatley (born 22 July 1965 in London, England) is an English painter. He specialises in expressionistic oil paintings. His subjects include city scapes, landscapes, architecture, still life, portraits and Christian works.

Since 1992, Whatley has been honouring the anniversaries of architectural landmarks in London by painting them in their centenary years. He typically paints them on location. Landmarks he has painted include Bush House (former home of the BBC World Service), Broadcasting House, BBC Television Centre and the Tate Gallery, Tate Britain, Tate Modern, and Tower Bridge.

Since the year 2000, Whatley's Christian faith (he was born Anglican and converted to Roman Catholicism in 2011) has inspired him to paint numerous tributes to Catholic devotions.

In December 2008, TIME magazine editors selected his portrait tribute of Barack Obama from 100,000 images on the photography site Flickr.com for publication. It was published in TIME's "Person of The Year" issue 2008/2009. The portrait is now in the private collection of an American property developer living in London.

== Education ==
Whatley studied at the Ipswich School of Art from 1981 to 1983, and from 1983 to 1986 at the Norwich School of Art, where he qualified with a BA (Hons) degree in Fine Art – Painting. He then studied at the University of London from 1986 to 1987, qualifying with a PGCE in art and design.

== Lecturer ==
From 1990 to 2000, Whatley was a part-time Lecturer of Portraiture at Kensington and Chelsea College in London.

== Commissions ==
In 1999, London Transport commissioned Whatley to paint an interior - "The Grand Staircase" – which he did on location inside Buckingham Palace. This painting was reproduced on posters and displayed all over the London Underground.

Also in 1999, the Royal Collection commissioned him to paint an exterior view of Buckingham Palace, which he did on location from the edge of Green Park. This painting was reproduced in advertisements promoting the Annual Summer Opening of the State Rooms in 1999 and 2000.

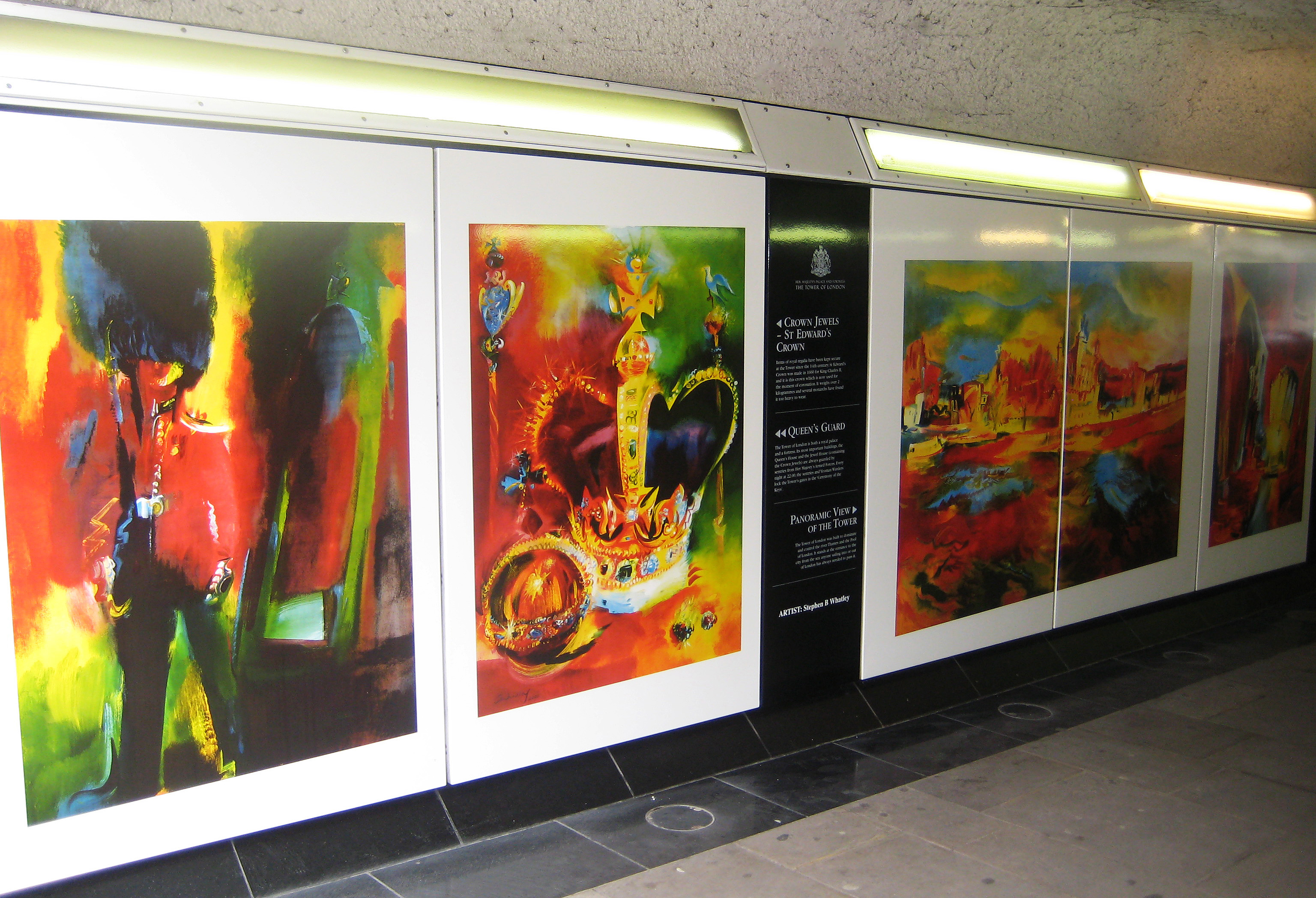
Whatley's commissioned paintings for the Tower of London, near Tower Hill Station

In 2000, Whatley was commissioned by Historic Royal Palaces and the Pool of London Partnership to undertake a series of 30 paintings for the Tower of London. Many of the works were painted on location in and around the Tower. Others were inspired by various historical images. In the spring of 2001, the paintings were reproduced on steel vitreous enamel panels lining the walls of the Tower Hill pedestrian underpass, connecting Tower Hill Underground station to the Tower of London.

In 2001, BBC Heritage commissioned Whatley to paint a view of the Radio Theatre inside Broadcasting House and to paint a view of the Top of the Pops studio at BBC Television Centre, during rehearsals and recording of the programme.

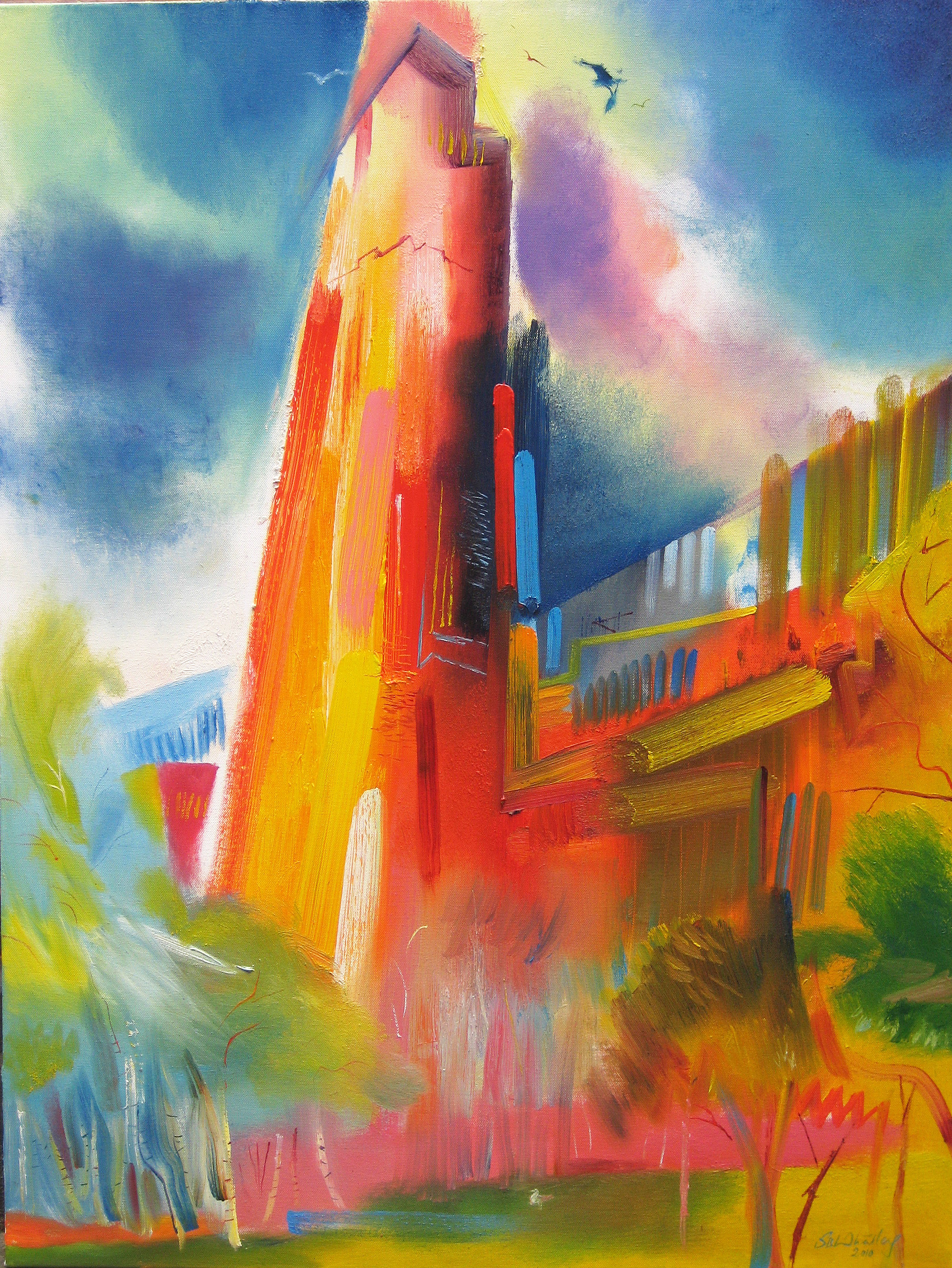
Tate Modern – "Tribute to A Decade" (Oil, 2010)

== Exhibitions ==
Whatley has exhibited in numerous exhibitions since 1983 - including shows at the ICA (Institute of Contemporary Art), the Lloyd's Building and London's Olympia Exhibition Arena. He has had solo exhibitions since 1988, highlights being his May 1993 exhibition, Hollywood Gold, at London's National Theatre and his 2007 exhibition in Cork Street, London. In 2012, his Diamond Jubilee portrait tribute of Queen Elizabeth II was exhibited at the Olympia International Art & Antiques Fair, London.

== Portraits ==
Whatley has painted the portraits of many public figures, who include actors Dame Judi Dench, Susan Hampshire OBE, Alec McCowen CBE, Sir Ian McKellen, Barbara Windsor MBE, Frances Barber, Prunella Scales CBE, Julie Walters OBE, Alison Steadman OBE, actor and singer Helen Reddy, and Siân Phillips CBE, TV presenter Sarah Greene; and barrister Michael Mansfield QC.

== Media ==
Whatley's work has been the subject of features in newspapers and magazines including The Guardian (18 February 1991); HELLO! magazine (#217 – 29 August 1992 / #1043 – 21 October 2008 / #1171 – 25 April 2011); Sunday Express, 2 May 1993; Marie Claire, May 1993; USA Today (May 1993) Metro newspaper (15 September 1999 and 17 July 2001) The Times (11 February 2002) The Guardian Weekend Magazine (26 April 2003); The New York Times (August 2004), MAJESTY magazine (January 2009 – a five-page feature about Whatley's Royal commissions); and various Catholic publications in 2010–2012.

In 2002, Whatley's painting of Buckingham Palace, in the Royal Collection, was reproduced on the programs for HM Queen's two Golden Jubilee concerts, held in the gardens of Buckingham Palace.

In 2006, one of Whatley's tributes to Marilyn Monroe was published in a new book, Marilyn In Art by Roger G Taylor (Pop Art Books), to coincide with the 80th anniversary of the Hollywood star's birth.

In 2007, Whatley's work promoted London's Tower Music Festival at the Tower Of London. His exhibition Hollywood Icons to Royal Gems also opened at the Arndean Gallery in London's Cork Street; exhibiting two Royal exclusives, one of his paintings, the "Crown Jewels II", on loan from HM Tower of London & "Buckingham Palace: View From The East Front", on loan by gracious permission of Her Majesty The Queen.

In 2004, Whatley was invited to the ceremonial re-opening of Tower Hill (which included the Tower Hill underpass). He was presented to the Queen and the Duke of Edinburgh in the Tower of London.

On August 16, 2026, the Spanish newspaper ABC published a feature article about Whatley. The feature highlighted Whatley's portraits of British actresses Barbara Windsor and Julie Walters and President Barack Obama (reproduced in Time magazine of January 2009) as well as Whatley's expressionistic paintings of Buckingham Palace. The feature traced his evolution as an artist, touching upon the death of his mother in an automobile accident when Whatley was 16 years old. "Art saved my life," he is quoted as remembering. Whatley recounted how a major inspiration for him was the expressionist painter David Bomberg. In 1999, Whatley received a commission from the London Museum of Transportation to create two paintings of Buckingham Palace. which today hang in King Charles III's official residence. In 2000, Whatley received a commission to create 30 paintings of iconic scenes for the Tower of London, including the Jewel House. Four years later, at a royal reception, Queen Elizabeth II personally thanked Whatley for his work. Whatley recounted for the Queen that he entered the Jewel House before and after its open hours so that he could better understand the sight without the distraction of crowds. This intrigued the Queen, who also showed her sense of humor by saying, in parting, "I am glad that they let you out!" The feature indicates that Whatley's most recent work is a painting of Victoria Harbour in Hong Kong.
