= Blackamoores =

2013 book by Onyeka

Blackamoores: Africans in Tudor England, their Presence, Status and Origins
- First edition
- Author: Onyeka
- Language: English
- Subject: Black British history
- Genre: Non-fiction; Historical
- Publisher: Narrative Eye
- Publication date: 2013
- Publication place: United Kingdom
- Media type: Print (hard & paperback)
- Pages: 463
- ISBN: 978-0953318216

Blackamoores: Africans in Tudor England, their Presence, Status and Origins is a 2013 non-fiction book by British historian and writer Onyeka Nubia that explores the history of Black people in Tudor-era England. Based on a study of 250,000 documents during 10 years of research, the book became part of a campaign by a Waltham Forest community group targeted at the UK government to diversify Britain's education curriculum.

== Synopsis ==
Based on a study of 250,000 documents during 10 years of research (including a 1501 letter written by statesman Thomas More to his friend John Holt), the book explores the history of Black people in Tudor-era England, focusing on challenging the conventional historiographical narrative "that Africans in the Tudor period automatically occupied the lowest positions in society [and were] usually stigmatized as slaves, transient immigrants or dangerous strangers." Through his work, Onyeka aims to show that Black Britons held numerous positions of importance in Tudor-era England, living in urban metropolises such as London, Plymouth, Bristol and Northampton, and were frequently employed by the English upper class due to their specialised technical abilities (Onyeka notes that most contemporary sources concerning Black Britons during the Tudor era comes from "personal letters sent between individuals or other correspondence not written for publication").

In addition, Onyeka aims to challenge the assertion that most Black Britons in the Tudor era were foreign-born, arguing that a significant minority had both been born and grew up in England. Regarding those in the Black British population who were foreign born, he writes that "there is evidence that some of the Africans who were present in London at the end of the sixteenth century were from Iberia and congregated in specific areas of the city operating as a self-sufficient community", and "some of these Iberian Africans were skilled artisans, and had professions, trades and knowledge which were acknowledged by the royalty of Europe including members of England’s aristocracy."

== Educational campaign ==
In 2013, Onyeka's book formed the centrepiece of a campaign targeted at the UK government (primarily education secretary Michael Gove) to diversify Britain's education curriculum. Consisting of a Waltham Forest community group which included the book's publisher, Narrative Eye, members of the campaign delivered a speech in the British House of Commons; prominent supporters of their efforts included Walthamstowe MP Stella Creasy.

== Reception ==
In a review published in Media Diversified, Rowena Mondiwa writes of the book:

With well-cited facts, records and other documents, credibility is lent to an under-researched and generally unpopular area. Onyeka acknowledges the challenges of working on such a neglected topic and stresses the history of the African diaspora be 'taken more seriously.' Onyeka carefully details the problems faced when researching the historical data of Africans — it begs the question, why are modern historians so uncomfortable with discussing the historical Black presence in Renaissance Europe? This is an area of history that hegemonic historians ignore.

Blackamoores was a Spring 2014 finalist for the People's Book Prize in the non-fiction category.

== See also ==
- Black and British: A Forgotten History
- Miranda Kaufmann
