= John Beauchamp, 1st Baron Beauchamp of Kidderminster =

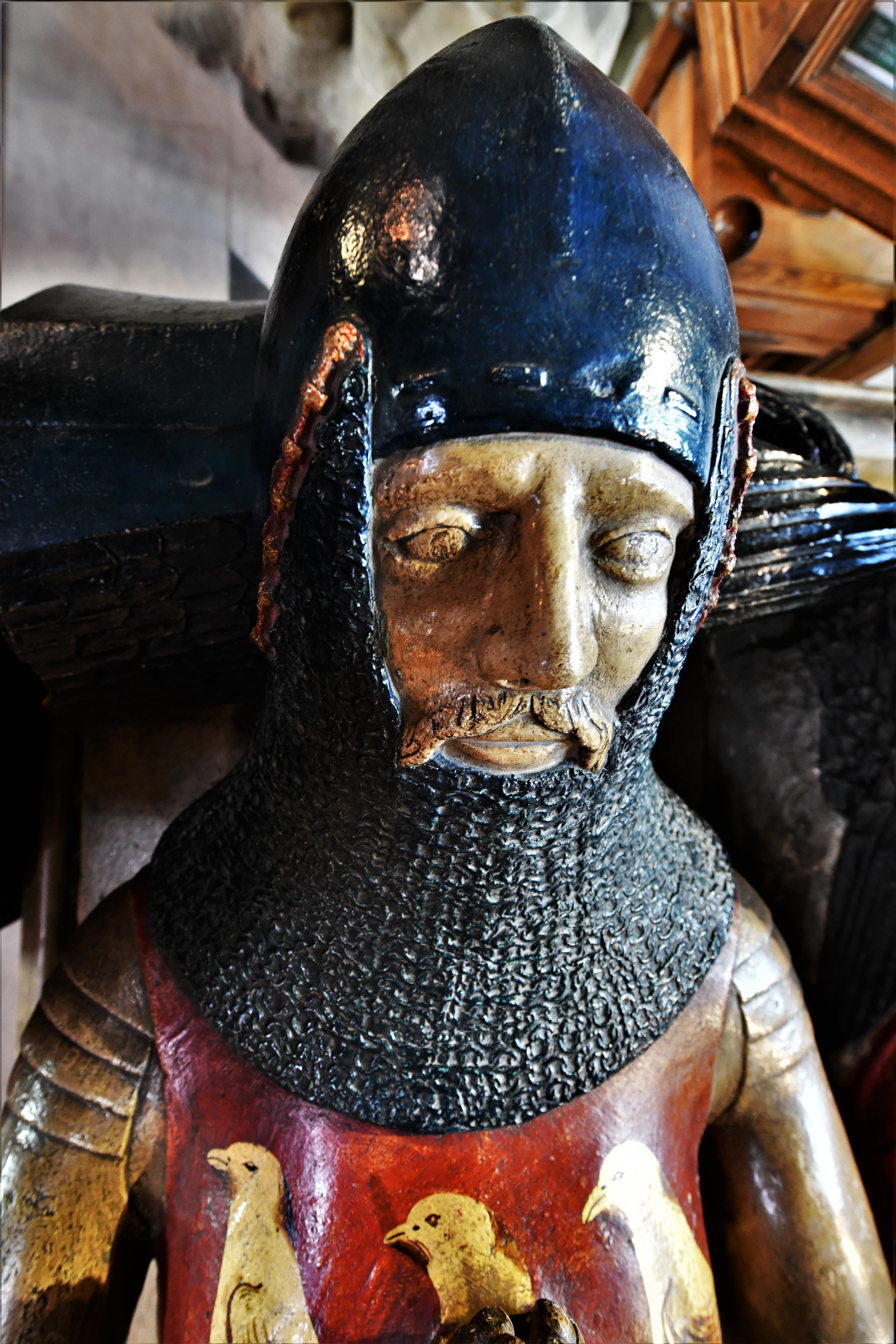
Tomb effigy believed to represent John de Beauchamp, Worcester Cathedral

Arms of Beauchamp of Holt (also of Bletsoe & Powick): Gules, a fess between six martlets or, a difference of the senior line of Beauchamp, Earl of Warwick

Sir John de Beauchamp, 1st Baron Beauchamp of Kidderminster (1339–12 May 1388) of Holt Castle in Worcestershire was an administrator and landowner.

== Origins ==
He was the son of Richard de Beauchamp, of Holt (d. 1327), the son of John de Beauchamp, of Holt (d. after 1297), the son of William (III) de Beauchamp (d. 1269), and brother of William de Beauchamp, 9th Earl of Warwick (c.1238-1298).

== Career ==
He served under John of Gaunt in the Spanish campaign of 1372 and in 1373 obtained a grant of a yearly fair at a place called 'le Rode' in the parish of Holt, on the day of St. Mary Magdalene. A favourite of the ailing King Edward III, in the years 1370 to 1375 he received several grants of offices, including the constableship of Bridgnorth Castle. He was elected as a Member of Parliament for Worcestershire to Edward III's last parliament (January 1377) and Richard II's first (October 1377).

Richard II regarded him warmly, and acted as godfather to his son. Retained in the household, Beauchamp soon received substantial further patronage, and by 1384 he had been made Receiver of the Chamber and Keeper of the King's Jewels. He received the Order of Knighthood on Richard II's entry into Scotland in 1385. That December he was granted for life the office of Justiciar of North Wales, to which was added in August 1386 a charter of liberties within his recently purchased estate at Kidderminster. Even though the Commons demanded in October that a new Steward of the Household be appointed only in parliament, Richard II refused to comply, and in January 1387 he promoted Beauchamp to the stewardship. Even more provocative was Sir John's creation on 10 October following as 'Lord of Beauchamp and Baron of Kidderminster', a new dignity to be maintained from the estates of Deerhurst Priory. This was the first creation of a peerage by letters patent. He was probably the builder of Holt Castle.

Beauchamp's rapid rise from esquire to baron could not be borne by the Lords Appellant, who included his kinsman, Thomas Beauchamp, 12th Earl of Warwick. The latter probably saw the rise of his cousin as a threat to his dominance of the Midlands. Arrested and imprisoned along with three other household knights, Lord Beauchamp was impeached in the Merciless Parliament and condemned by the lords for treason. He was beheaded on Tower Hill on 12 May 1388 and was buried in Worcester Cathedral. Fortunately for his heir, John, then aged eleven, he had entailed certain of his manors, so these were exempt from forfeiture.

== Marriage and children ==
In about 1370 he married Joan FitzWith, daughter and heiress of Robert FitzWith, then a minor in the king's wardship. By Joan he has issue including:

- John Beauchamp, 2nd Baron Beauchamp of Kidderminster (1378–1420) (attainder reversed 1398; forfeit in 1400 by renewal of attainder).
