= Onyeka Nubia =

British historian, writer and lecturer

Onyeka Nubia FRHistS is a British historian, author and academic. Using the pen name Onyeka, his works explore the history of Black British people, and multiculturalism in the United Kingdom. In 2013, he published the non-fiction work Blackamoores: Africans in Tudor England, their Presence, Status and Origins, which detailed the history of Black people in Tudor England. Blackamoores formed the basis of Onyeka's PhD by publication awarded by the University of East Anglia in 2016.

== Career ==
Onyeka's third novel, The Phoenix, was awarded the 2009 African Achievers award for Communication and Media for the psychological portrayal of the Black British experience.

In 2009 Onyeka appeared on the television programme Shoot the Messenger on the TV channel VoxAfrica, discussing the experience of the African diaspora.

Onyeka is an assistant professor in the department of history at the University of Nottingham. In 2025, his course Imagining 'Britain: Decolonising Tolkien et al in that university sparked a controversy online following a critical article on The Telegraph website.

He presented the 5Select television programme Walking Victorian Britain and contributed to the 2023 Channel 4 docuseries The Queens Who Changed the World.

== Writings ==
=== Fiction ===
==== Novels ====
- Waiting to Explode – How to Stay Alive, Narrative Eye (1998) ISBN 0-953318-20-6
- The Black Prince – Leopards in the Temple, Narrative Eye (1999) ISBN 0-953318-24-9
- The Phoenix – Misrule in the Land of Nod, Narrative Eye (2008) ISBN 0-953318-27-3

==== Plays ====
- The Great Challenge (1992–1994) - National tour
- The Whirlwind and the Storm (2001) - Cochrane and Shaw Theatres
- Young Othello (2016)

=== Non-fiction ===
- Blackamoores: Africans in Tudor England, their Presence, Status and Origins, Narrative Eye (2013) ISBN 0-953318-21-4
