= Hatch Beauchamp =

Village and civil parish in Somerset, England

Coordinates: 50.9796°N 2.9913°W

- Civil parish
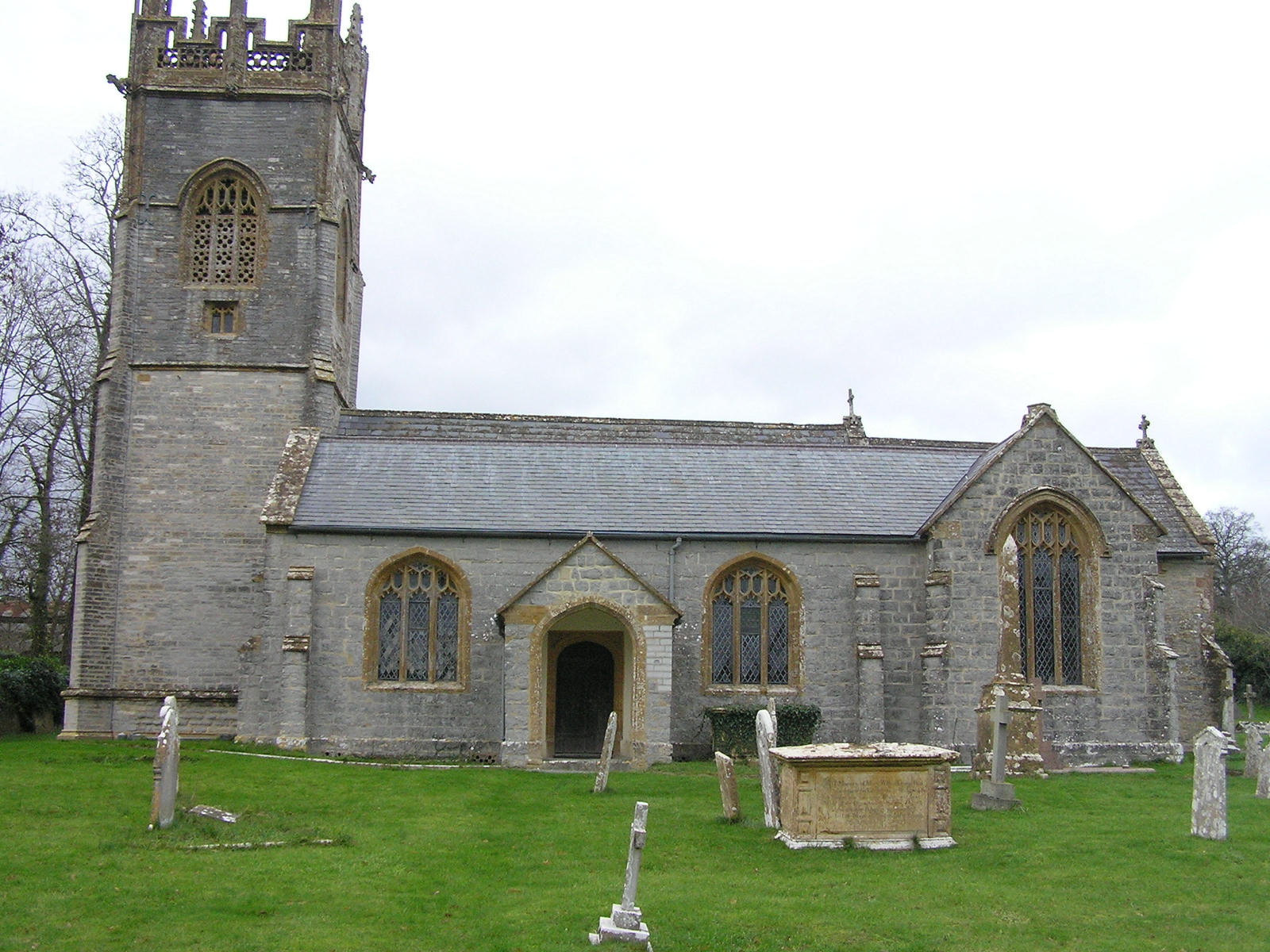
- Church of St John the Baptist

- Location within Somerset
- Population: 626 (2021 census)
- OS grid reference: ST305205
- Unitary authority: Somerset Council
- Ceremonial county: Somerset
- Region: South West
- Country: England
- Sovereign state: United Kingdom
- Post town: Taunton
- Postcode district: TA3
- Dialling code: 01823
- Police: Avon and Somerset
- Fire: Devon and Somerset
- Ambulance: South Western
- UK Parliament: Taunton and Wellington

Hatch Beauchamp is a village and civil parish in Somerset, England, situated 5 miles (8.0 km) south east of Taunton. At the 2021 census, the parish had a population of 626.

== History ==
Arms of Beauchamp of Hatch: Vair

The manor of "Hache" dates from Saxon times and became the caput of a feudal barony after the Norman Conquest of England in 1066, when it was granted to Robert, Count of Mortain (d.1095) by his half-brother William the Conqueror. Hatch Beauchamp is described under the title of Terra Comitis Mortoniensis ("lands of the Count/Earl of Mortain") as follows: "Robert holds Hache of the Earl: 8 acres (32,000 m^{2}) of meadow, 50 acres (200,000 m^{2}) of wood; arable, six carucates; in demesne, two carucates, and three servants, eleven villanes, four cottagers with three ploughs." This Robert who was the vassal of the Earl was Robert FitzIvo. Six years later in 1092, the manor was in the hands of Robert of Beauchamp, who may have been the same person. The Beauchamp family were loyal allies of William the Conqueror, and had been granted large estates in Somerset and Bedfordshire.

Hatch Beauchamp is noted around 1300 as having a market every Thursday, but this has long since vanished. Like most of the South West of England, the area was staunchly Royalist in the English Civil War, although the local town of Taunton was a Parliamentary stronghold, and was besieged.

The village today contains an inn, and a manor house, Hatch Court, built around 1750, in the Palladian architectural style. Before this, a great house had existed on the same site since the Middle Ages, but had fallen into ruin by the 17th century. The inn dates from around the mid-18th century.

Hatch Beauchamp is the burial place of Colonel John Rouse Merriott Chard, VC, RE (21 December 1847 – 1 November 1897) a British soldier who won the Victoria Cross for his role in the defence of Rorke's Drift in 1879.

In 2009, a contemporary art gallery named CLOSE Gallery was established in Hatch Beauchamp.

== Governance ==
The parish council has responsibility for local issues.

For local government purposes, the village comes under the unitary authority of Somerset Council. For elections to the council, Hatch Beauchamp is in the 'Blackdown & Neroche' electoral ward.

Historically, the parish was part of Taunton Rural District from 1894 until 1974, when it became part of Taunton Deane district. In 2019, Taunton Deane merged with West Somerset to form Somerset West and Taunton, and in 2023 the districts of Somerset were merged with Somerset County Council to form the current unitary authority.

For elections to the House of Commons, it is in Taunton and Wellington constituency.

== Demographics ==
Census population of Hatch Beauchamp parish
Census	Population	Female	Male	Households	Source
2001	555	302	253	226	
2011	620	322	298	250	
2021	626	331	295	259	

== Landmarks ==
Hatch Court, which was built around 1755 by Thomas Prowse for John Collins, contains a small military museum commemorating the life and work of the renowned Brigadier Hamilton Gault, great-uncle of the present owner, MP for Taunton, and member of the Quebec Chamber of Commerce, as well as a decorated Boer War hero. Hamilton Gault was the founder of the British Empire's last privately raised regiment, the Princess Patricia's Canadian Light Infantry. The regiment saw action in both World Wars, and were the first Allied force to enter Amsterdam in early 1945. They were more recently in action against the Taliban in Afghanistan, as part of Operation Anaconda in 2002.

== Religious sites ==
In Hatch Beauchamp the Norman Church of St John the Baptist has a crenellated 3-stage tower from about 1500. It displays crocketed pinnacles, a pierced parapet with quatrefoils and arcades in the merlons and gargoyles. The church has diagonal buttresses to support the tower whereas, in other churches within this group, angle buttresses are the norm. The buttresses, which finish in the belfry stage, support small detached shafts which rise upwards to form the outside subsidiary pinnacles of each corner cluster.

== Notable residents of Hatch Beauchamp ==
- Robert de Beauchamp (d. 1252)
- John Chard, as a lieutenant awarded the Victoria Cross for his part in the defence of Rorke's Drift in the Anglo-Zulu War of 1879
- Anson Baronets
- Justin Langer, cricketer, former Australian opening batsman and Somerset CCC

== Rail ==
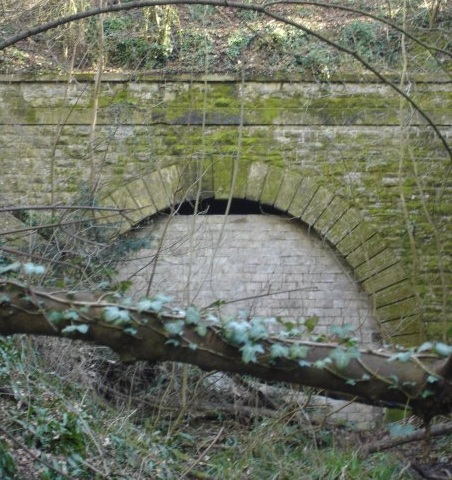
The Chard Branch Line as it was in 2010, entering the now sealed tunnel immediately prior to Hatch Beauchamp station

In the Victorian era, Hatch was connected to the national railway grid in 1866 as part of the Bristol and Exeter Railway. The village had a chalet-style station, known as Hatch, on the Chard Branch Line which closed in 1963. In 1962, following the Beeching Report, railway services ceased to operate completely, although the railway station remains.
