= Thomas Rouse =

English politician

Sir Thomas Rouse, 1st Baronet (27 March 1608 – 26 May 1676) was an English politician who sat in the House of Commons variously between 1654 and 1660 and supported the Parliamentary cause during the English Civil War.

== Biography ==
Rouse was the son of Sir John Rouse of Rous Lench, Worcestershire who was MP in 1626. He matriculated at Brasenose College, Oxford on 20 October 1626 and was awarded BA from Corpus Christi College, Oxford on 31 January 1628. Also in 1628, he entered Middle Temple. He was created Baronet Rouse of Rouse Lench on 23 July 1641.

Rouse was added to the Committee for Worcestershire in 1645 and was High Sheriff of Worcestershire in 1648. In 1654, he was elected Member of Parliament for Worcestershire in the First Protectorate Parliament. He was an assessment commissioner in 1656 and was also Custos Rotulorum in 1656.

In 1660, Rouse was elected MP for Evesham in the Convention Parliament. He became a J.P. on 10 July 1660.

Rouse died at the age of 67 and was buried at Rouse Lench, where there is a monument.

Rouse married firstly Jane Ferrers daughter of Sir John Ferrers of Tamworth Castle, secondly Frances Murray daughter of David Murray and thirdly Ann.

Parliament of England
Preceded by Richard Salwey; John James	Member of Parliament for Worcestershire; 1654–1656; With: Edward Pytts; Nicholas Lechmere; John Bridges 1654; Talbot Badger 1654; James Berry 1656; John Nanfan 1656	Succeeded by Nicholas Lechmere; Thomas Foley
Baronetage of England
New creation	Baronet (of Rouse Lench); 1641–1676	Succeeded by Edward Rouse
