= John Atwood =

John Atwood (or similar) may refer to:

- John Atwood (1643–1712), name in religion Peter Atwood, English Dominican
- John Atwood (colonial administrator) (1576–1644), Assistant Governor of the Plymouth Colony in the US state of Massachusetts
- John Atwood (American football) (1923–2008), American football player, oil executive
- John A. Atwood (1850–1930), American politician and businessman
- John Leland Atwood (1904–1999), American engineer and manager in the aerospace industry
- J. Brian Atwood (born 1942), American diplomat
- John Attwood (died 1865), British politician
- John Atte Wode (or Attwode, 14th century), MP for Worcestershire (UK Parliament constituency)
