= John James (Parliamentarian) =

John James (c. 1610 – May 1681) was an English politician who sat in the House of Commons in 1653. He served in the Parliamentary army in the English Civil War.

== Biography ==
James was the son of John James of Astley, Worcestershire and his wife Mary Winford, daughter of Walter Winford. He became a supporter of the Parliamentary cause and served in the army. On 19 April 1647, the Committee of both Kingdoms ordered that '"Capt. James shall have power to seize upon and recruit his troop out of such horses as are the State's, marked with the State's mark, and have been embezled and sold away to any persons in cos. Bucks, Berks, and Oxon." He was added to the Committee for Sequestrations in Worcestershire on 29 July 1648, and was appointed a sequestration commissioner for the county on 4 September 1649 and on 7 February 1650. In December 1650 he was High Sheriff of Herefordshire. The Committee for Compounding wrote to him on 26 December 1650, " Knowing how much you may contribute to carry on sequestration work, we have joined Mr. Herring (MP for Herefordshire) with you therein, and beg you both to use the utmost care to manage it to the best advantage. We have heard so much of your prudence and readiness that we believe you will omit nothing, and therefore will not trouble you further." He replied on 10 January 1651 "Thanks for your remembrance of me and my cousin Salway (his colleague). I am sorry I cannot answer your expectations in regard of other public business, but I shall spare as much time as I can for your business" and he was eventually discharged from the committee for sequestration for unsatisfactory accounts in or about March 1652 He was appointed captain of a Troop of Horse Militia in Herefordshire on 21 August 1650. As Colonel James, he was appointed commander of the Horse and Dragoons in Worcestershire, under a commission from the Council of State on 31 March 1651 to " raise and command the forces in co. Worcester, under the Militia Act," and he received a further order on 30 June for "listing volunteers in co. Worcs." On 7 October 1651 the Council wrote to him at Worcester "The Council have ordered Col. Cooper to search for some gold said to be hid in Worcester, belonging to the enemy; the money is found, and 150 pieces of old gold are now in your hands; send it up to us to be disposed of as the Council shall direct." The Council wrote him on 31 March 1651 "Being informed of your fitness to command the horse and dragoons raised in co. Worcs, we have issued a commission for that purpose, which we enclose, and desire you to give your best furtherance and assistance in raising of them that they may be ready on all occasions for preservation of the peace." He received a commission as captain in the 1st Horse Regiment for the safety of the Eastern Association and Inland parts on 21 April 1651, and as these measures were taken to repel the Scots army under Charles II, he probably took part in the Battle of Worcester. He was added by order of Parliament to the High Court of Justice on 25 June 1651.

In 1653, James was nominated as Member of Parliament for Worcestershire for the Barebones Parliament. The Council of State ordered on 15 June 1653, that Col. John James and other MPs "should have the lodgings late in possession of Sir Henry Vane, Sir H. Mildmay, and Col. Thomson, and any others they think fit, so that they may be lodged together," and further ordered on 8 July, "that the Whitehall Committee should put them in possession of the house late Dennis Bond's." On 1 November 1653, he was appointed a member of the seventh Council of State, which lasted till December 1653, and took the oath of secrecy on 5 November. He was appointed one of the Ordnance Committee and also of the Committee for Lunatics on 8 November, and was added to the Irish and Scotch Committee on 28 November 1653.

In 1654, James got into a dispute with Charles Rich which appeared to be leading to a duel. On 25 April 1654, the Lord Protector's Council reported. "The Lord President having last Saturday issued a warrant to take into custody Charles Rich and John James on information of a quarrel between them, both parties appeared before the Council where both were bound in £1,000 and two sureties in £1,000 not to fight each other, nor break the public peace". On 8 May "a warrant to be prepared for commitment of both to the Tower, they not having attended to give security." On 10 May, "two warrants signed but suspended till Jessop (Assistant Clerk of the Council) give notice to Rich in the country". On 19 May, "Order that they both give security in £1,000 each with two sufficient sureties to keep the peace towards each other for all times to come and neither of them to break it, and on so doing that their warrant for commitment to the Tower be suspended."

James was a commissioner for ejecting scandalous and insufficient ministers and schoolmasters in August 1654, and a commissioner to raise £1,000 Assessment upon the county in 1656.

James appear to have been brought to trial at the Restoration and was probably pardoned. On 1 September 1670 he was given licence as John James, of Tripleton, "to remain in and about London and Westminster, although an officer in the army of the late usurped powers."

James married Jane Higgins, daughter of William Higgins, of Tripleton, Herefordshire.

James died at Tripleton at the age 71.

Parliament of England
Preceded by John Wilde; Humphrey Salwey	Member of Parliament for Worcestershire; 1653; With: Richard Salwey	Succeeded by Sir Thomas Rouse, 1st Baronet; Edward Pytts; Nicholas Lechmere; John Bridges; Talbot Badger
