= John Bridges (Parliamentarian) =

English politician

John Bridges (born 1610) was an English politician who sat in the House of Commons in 1654 and 1656. He fought in the Parliamentarian army in the English Civil War.

== Biography ==
Bridges was the eldest son of John Bridges of Alcester, Warwickshire and Hackney, barrister at law, and his wife Elizabeth Holyoake. His great grandfather John Bridges was of an Irish family and settled at South Littleton, Worcestershire in 1558, and later acquired the Alcester estate.

Bridges was an active soldier in the Parliamentary army in the Civil War. In April 1644, he conveyed ammunition into Gloucester while it was under siege from the Royalists. On 11 May 1644 the House of Commons ordered John Bridges, major of foot, to be added to the Committee of Worcestershire on 30 March 1645. They gave him a vote of thanks "for his great services," and appointed him Governor of Warwick Castle and Town on 12 May 1645. He was made Colonel of Boseville's regiment of foot on 24 June 1645. He took part in the siege of Worcester under Colonel Edward Whalley, and was a parliamentary commissioner to receive its surrender in July 1646. He was ordered to return his forces into winter quarters on 25 November 1646, and was "continued" as Governor of Warwick Castle on 25 March 1647, and still held the role in 1649. In about 1648 he bought the estate of Hurcott near Kidderminster, from John Evelyn for £3,400. Information was laid against him on 22 August 1649 that he had captured and concealed 25 waggons, many laden with plate and other treasure, belonging to the late King. He was added to the Committee for dealing with Scandalous and Malignant Ministers in Worcestershire on 24 September 1652.

In 1654, Bridges was elected Member of Parliament for Worcestershire in the First Protectorate Parliament. He was in service in Ireland in 1655 and represented Sligo and Roscommon in the Second Protectorate Parliament in 1656. He raised a petition on 7 April 1657 when he was Governor of Kilmalloch, for payment for arrears for personal service, which was referred to the Irish Committee, On 21 March 1660 a warrant was issued to pay him £100 "for his expenses in Ireland where he is going on special service".

The allegations that he had carried off 25 waggons of the King's goods returned following the Restoration. In June 1660 Sir Joseph Wagstaffe petitioned the King "that Colonel John Bridges late Governor of Warwick Castle, who detains £50,000 worth of the late King's money and goods, may be excepted out of the Act of Oblivion" and in the same month Charles Talbot laid information against him and others" for seizing the late King's carriages about the time of the Battles of Naseby and Edgehill." On 17 August 1663 Lord Ashley reported that Bridges was "acquitted on a suit brought against him for detaining plate and household goods of the late King". John Strode (Governor of Dover Castle) who had a warrant of 21 August 1663 for a grant of a "moiety of what is taken and unaccounted for, and not pardoned by the Act of Indemnity" persisted in the belief that Bridges should be convicted although Lord Ashley pointed out that Strode "may be encouraged by the grant".

== Family ==
Bridges married Mary Beale daughter of Bartholomew Beale, of Walton, Shropshire in 1635. His grandson Sir Brook Bridges, 1st Baronet was created a baronet.

Parliament of England
Preceded by Richard Salwey; John James	Member of Parliament for Worcestershire; 1654; With: Sir Thomas Rouse, Bt; Edward Pytts; Nicholas Lechmere; Talbot Badger	Succeeded by Sir Thomas Rouse, Bt; Edward Pytts; Nicholas Lechmere; James Berry; John Nanfan
