= John Lyttelton =

John Lyttelton may refer to:

- John Lyttelton, 9th Viscount Cobham (1881–1949), British politician
- John Lyttelton (MP) (1561–1601), English politician
- John Lyttelton, 11th Viscount Cobham (1943–2006), British nobleman
- Sir John Lyttelton (1520–1590) (1519–1590), constable of Dudley Castle, England, keeper of parks, Custos Rotulorum of Worcestershire

== John Littleton ==
Using an alternative spelling:

- John Littleton (born 1957), an American artist
- John Littleton (sheriff), High Sheriff of Cornwall

== See also ==
- John Littleton Dawson (1813–1870), Democratic member of the U.S. House of Representatives from Pennsylvania
