= Lyttelton (surname) =

Lyttelton is a surname. Notable people with the surname include:

- The Lyttelton family, a British aristocratic family:
  - Alfred Lyttelton (1857–1913), British politician and sportsman
  - Arthur Lyttelton (1852–1903), Anglican Bishop and Master of Selwyn College, Cambridge
  - Charles Lyttelton (1714–1768), English churchman and antiquary who served as Bishop of Carlisle 1762–1768 and President of the Society of Antiquaries of London 1765–1768
  - Charles Lyttelton, 8th Viscount Cobham (1842–1922), British politician and cricketer
  - Charles Lyttelton, 10th Viscount Cobham (1909–1977), ninth Governor-General of New Zealand and British cricketer
  - Edith Lyttelton (1865–1948), British author and wife of Oliver Lyttelton, 1st Viscount Chandos
  - Edward Lyttelton (1855–1942), British sportsman, Schoolmaster and Cleric
  - George Lyttelton, 1st Baron Lyttelton (1709–1773), British politician
  - George Lyttelton, 2nd Baron Lyttelton (1763–1828), British politician
  - George William Lyttelton, 4th Baron Lyttelton (1540–1599), British politician and founder of Canterbury, New Zealand
  - George William Lyttelton, British teacher and writer
  - George William Spencer Lyttelton (1847–1913), British civil servant
  - Gilbert Lyttelton(1540–1599), English politician and knight
  - Humphrey Lyttelton (1921–2008), British jazz musician and broadcaster
  - John Lyttelton, 9th Viscount Cobham (1881–1949), British politician
  - John Lyttelton (MP) (died 1601), English politician
  - John Lyttelton, 11th Viscount Cobham (1943–2006), British nobleman
  - Sir John Lyttelton (1520–1590), constable of Dudley Castle, England, keeper of parks, Custos Rotulorum of Worcestershire
  - Laura Lyttelton (1862–1886), English Pre-Raphaelite artists model and wife of Alfred Lyttelton
  - Neville Lyttelton (1845–1931), British Army General
  - Oliver Lyttelton, 1st Viscount Chandos (1893–1972), British businessman and politician
  - Penelope Lyttelton, Viscountess Cobham (born 1954), British businesswoman
  - Thomas de Littleton (c. 1407–1481), British judge
  - Thomas Lyttelton, 2nd Baron Lyttelton (1744–1779), British politician
  - Sarah Lyttelton, Baroness Lyttelton (1787–1870), governess to Edward VII of the United Kingdom and wife of William Lyttelton, 3rd Baron Lyttelton
  - William Henry Lyttelton, 1st Baron Lyttelton, British colonial governor
  - William Henry Lyttelton, 3rd Baron Lyttelton, British politician
  - Leonora Anson, Countess of Lichfield (née Lyttelton, born 1949), British aristocrat
  - Viola Grosvenor, Duchess of Westminster (née Lyttelton, 1912–1987), British noblewoman
  - Lavinia Talbot (née Lyttelton, 1849–1939) British promoter of women's education
