= John Wood (died 1458) =

English politician (died 1458)

John Wood (died 1458) was an English politician.

Wood was evidently a close relative of John Atte Wode MP, perhaps his son (perhaps illegitimate). Upon Atte Wode's death in 1391, his properties were inherited by Sir John Beauchamp MP, but after Beauchamp's death in 1420, they were conveyed to Wood.

Wood was elected MP for Worcester in May 1413, knight of the shire for Worcestershire in November 1414, Worcester again in 1415 and March 1416, and Worcestershire again in May 1421, 1423, 1429, 1433 and 1435.

He also served as Alnager for Worcestershire from Michaelmas 1405 to 1432, Bailiff for Worcester 1416–17, Escheator for Worcestershire 1416–17, 1424–26 and 1431–32, a JP in Worcestershire 1417–1458, and Deputy Sheriff of Worcestershire 1425–1426.
