= Littleton =

Littleton may refer to:

== Places ==
In Ireland:

- Littleton, County Tipperary, a village
- Littleton (electoral division) in County Tipperary

In the United Kingdom:

- Littleton, Cheshire, a village
- Littleton, Hampshire, a village
- Littleton, Somerset, a hamlet
- High Littleton, Somerset
- Littleton-upon-Severn, South Gloucestershire
- West Littleton, South Gloucestershire
- Littleton, Guildford, Surrey, a hamlet
- Littleton, Spelthorne, Surrey; originally in Middlesex
- Littleton, Wiltshire
- Littleton Drew, Wiltshire
- Littleton Panell, Wiltshire
- North and Middle Littleton, Worcestershire
- South Littleton, Worcestershire

In the United States:

- Littleton, Colorado
- Littleton, Illinois
- Littleton, Iowa
- Littleton, Kentucky
- Littleton, Maine
- Littleton, Massachusetts
- Littleton, New Hampshire, a New England town
  - Littleton (CDP), New Hampshire, the main village in the town
- Littleton, North Carolina
- Littleton, West Virginia
- Littleton Township (disambiguation)

== Business ==
- Littleton Coin Company, New Hampshire, United States

== Entertainment ==
- This is Littleton, an Australian television comedy sketch series set in the fictional town of Littleton

== People ==
- Littleton (name)

== See also ==
- The Littletons (disambiguation)
- Lyttelton (disambiguation)
