= John Nanfan (MP) =

English politician

John Nanfan (died c. 1677) was a 17th-century English politician, elected MP for Worcestershire in 1656.

Nanfan was the oldest son of William Nanfan of Birtsmorton, Worcestershire.

He married Mary, daughter of Edward Fleet alias Walsgrave of Worcester. Their son was Bridges Nanfan MP.

He was appointed an Assessment Commissioner for Worcestershire in 1656, and a JP in 1660.

Nanfan was elected MP for Worcestershire in 1656, but Oliver Cromwell would not let him take his seat. He stood unsuccessfully for Worcestershire in 1659, and for the city of Worcester in 1661.

He died around 1677.

Parliament of England
| Preceded by Sir Thomas Rouse, Bt; Edward Pytts; Nicholas Lechmere; John Bridges; Talbot Badger | Member of Parliament for Worcestershire; 1656; With: James Berry; Edward Pytts; Nicholas Lechmere; Sir Thomas Rouse, Bt | Succeeded by Nicholas Lechmere; Thomas Foley |
