= Oliver King =

15th and 16th-century Bishop of Bath and Wells

- Bishop of Bath and Wells
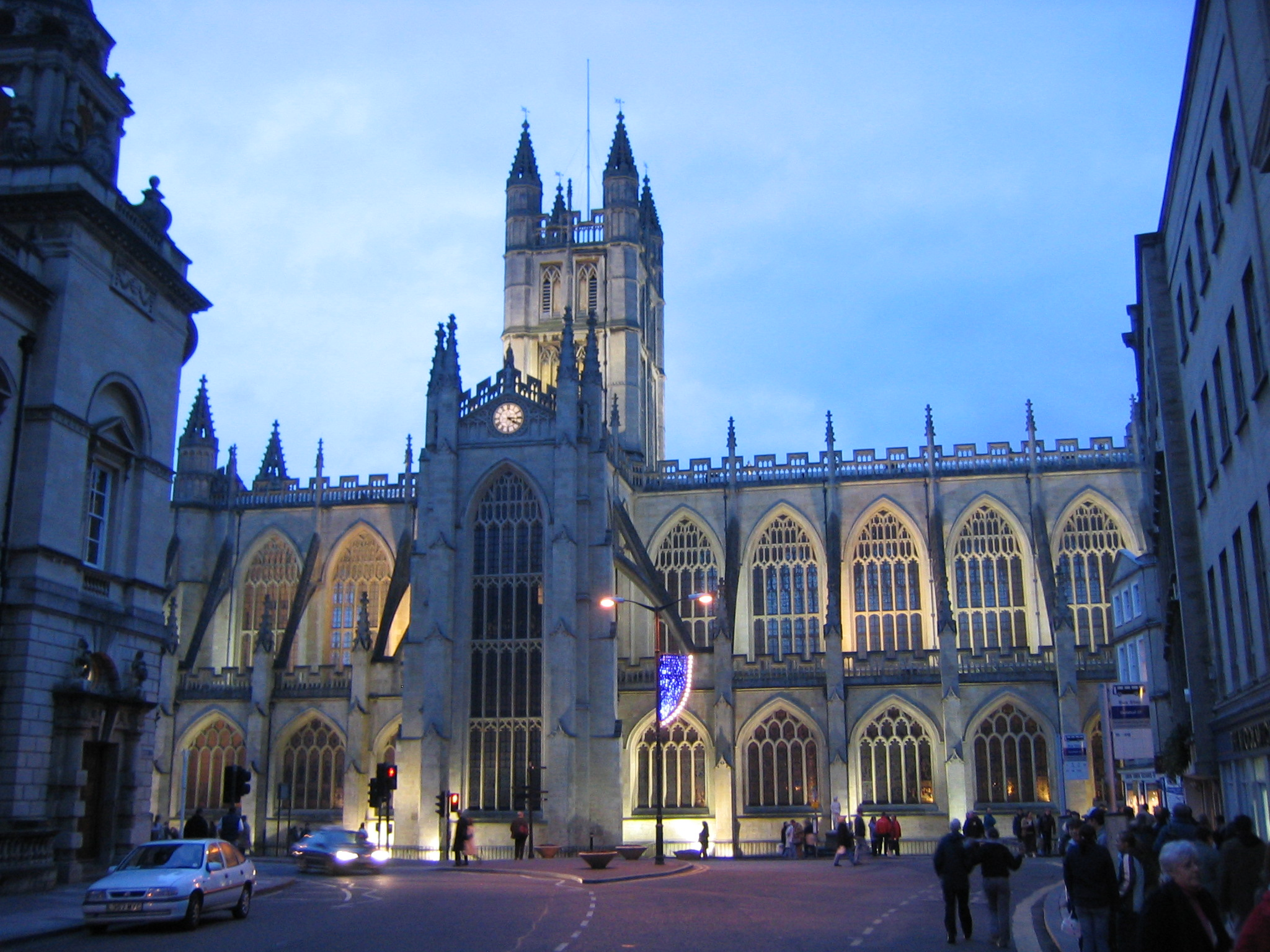
- Bath Abbey at sunset (December 2004)
- Appointed: 6 November 1495
- Term ended: 29 August 1503
- Predecessor: Richard Foxe
- Successor: Adriano de Castello
- Previous post: Bishop of Exeter

Orders
- Consecration: 3 February 1493

Personal details
- Died: 29 August 1503
- Denomination: Roman Catholic
- Education: Eton College, King's College, Cambridge

Oliver King (c. 1432 – 29 August 1503) was a Bishop of Exeter and Bishop of Bath and Wells who restored Bath Abbey after 1500.

== Early life ==
King was educated at Eton, where he was a king's scholar, and King's College, Cambridge, where he graduated Master of Arts by 1456/57, was a Fellow of King's and served as junior proctor of the university in 1459–1460. He became a priest then studied civil law at the University of Orléans as well as at Cambridge, graduating as doctor of Civil Law.

== Career ==
In 1466 King was appointed Rector of Broughton, Hampshire, and in 1473 Warden of St John's Hospital, Dorchester. Under the new regime of Edward IV of England he was appointed Clerk of the Signet in 1473, in 1475 was sent as ambassador to the Duke of Brittany.

On 18 March 1476, King became the king's "first and principal Secretary" for the French tongue for life, and succeeded William Hatteclyffe as king's secretary in 1480.; and receiving the salary of £20 per annum. Supposedly being expert in "the French language" King was effectively second secretary, discharging the duties of the Signet in Hatteclyffe's absence. Under Edward IV the Secretary's office expanded the number of clerks to at least four, with a Gentleman and "writers of the King's Signet under him".

The Secretary and his clerks pay for their carriage of harness in court, except a little coffer to which the king's warrants and bills are signed, and other letters and remembrances be kept ...Thiis coffer is carried at the King's cost, whereas the Controller will sign. The Secretary has 3 Getlemen-in-waiting on him for all that office. The remnant of all other servants to be found at his livery in the country delivered by the Herberger...whe [sic] he is out, ehe has a yeoman to keep chamber, eating at Chamberlain's board in the hall: both he and his clerks take clothing off the King's Wardrobe.

During the early modern monarchy the Secretaries gradually assumed more importance, and standing at court, their office expanded and their salary improved to the same as the Clerk of the council.

In 1480 King was appointed Canon of the eleventh stall at St George's Chapel, Windsor Castle, a position he held until 1503.

King was appointed Bishop of Exeter on 1 October 1492, consecrated on 3 February 1493. He was then translated to the see of Bath and Wells on 6 November 1495. He died on 29 August 1503.

=== Restoration of Bath Abbey ===
King organised the restoration of Bath Abbey after 1500. The story of the refounding is told on the front of the Abbey in carved Bath stone. King had a dream in which he saw a host of angels on a ladder, the Holy Trinity and an olive tree with a crown on it. He heard a voice: "Let an Olive establish the crown, and let a King restore the Church." King believed this was a call for him to support the candidature of Henry Tudor as King, and to restore the Abbey. These images are carved on the West Front of the Abbey with coats of arms of the Montague Family (who paid for the carved wooden doors) and Henry VII's coat of arms. There are also statues of the twelve apostles, including a large statue of St Peter and one of Saint Paul.

== Citations ==
Political offices
Preceded by William Hatteclyff	Secretary of State (England); 1480–1483	Succeeded by John Kendal
Preceded by	Clerk of the Signet	Succeeded by
Catholic Church titles
Preceded by Richard Foxe	Bishop of Exeter; 1492–1495	Succeeded by Richard Redman
Preceded by Richard Foxe	Bishop of Bath and Wells; 1495–1503	Succeeded by Adriano de Castello
