= Talbot Badger =

Talbot Badger (born c. 1621) was an English politician who sat in the House of Commons in 1654.

Badger was the son of John Badger of The Pool House, Hanley Castle, Worcestershire. In the 16th century The Pool House and its lands was held by the Badger family of the lords of the manor of Hanley Castle. He matriculated at Lincoln College, Oxford on 5 April 1639, aged 17. In 1654, he was elected Member of Parliament for Worcestershire in the First Protectorate Parliament. He was appointed an assessment commissioner in 1656. It was said of Badger that "By his holy and humble life he exercised much influence for good on his neighbours".

Badger had a daughter Jane who married Anthony Young, of Hanley, to whom she brought The Pool House. Badger may have been a close relation of Roland Badger of Hanley Castle (parish), who complained in 1655 of his "sequestration for Recusancy on a bare suspicion, having lived quietly all the late troubles."

Parliament of England
Preceded by Richard Salwey; John James	Member of Parliament for Worcestershire; 1654; With: Sir Thomas Rouse, 1st Baronet; Edward Pytts; Nicholas Lechmere; John Bridges	Succeeded by Sir Thomas Rouse, 1st Baronet; Edward Pytts; Nicholas Lechmere; James Berry; John Nanfan
