= Thomas Foley (died 1677) =

English ironmaster and politician (1617–1677)

Sir Thomas Foley
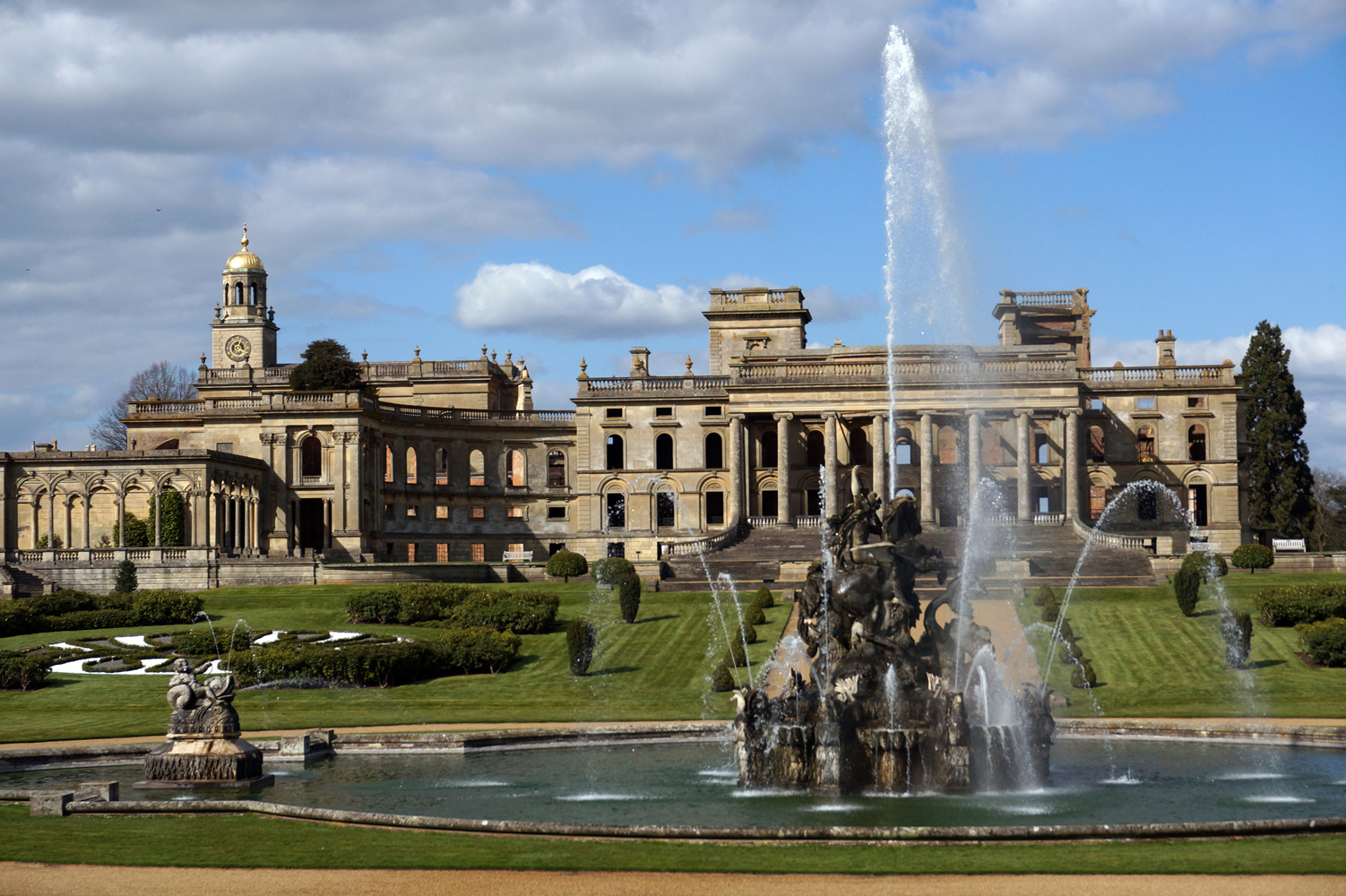
- Witley Court, Worcestershire
- Born: 3 December 1617
- Died: 1 October 1677 (aged 59)
- Occupations: Ironmaster and politician

Thomas Foley (3 December 1617 – 1 October 1677) was an English ironmaster and politician who sat in the House of Commons at various times between 1659 and 1677.

== Early life ==
Foley was born on 3 December 1617. He was the third, but eldest surviving, son of Richard Foley and, his second wife, Alice Brindley, herself the daughter of Sir William Brindley of Willenhall. His father was a prominent Midlands ironmaster of Stourbridge.

== Career ==
Foley took over his father's business and made great profits from it in the 1650s and 1660s, which he used to buy estates. He was appointed High Sheriff of Worcestershire for 1656–57.

In 1659, he was elected Member of Parliament for Worcestershire in the Third Protectorate Parliament. He was elected MP for Bewdley in 1660 for the Convention Parliament. In 1673, he was elected MP for Bewdley in a by-election to the Cavalier Parliament.

Foley built Witley Court. In the late 1660s, he founded a bluecoat school at Stourbridge known as Old Swinford Hospital, which he endowed in his will. He handed his business over to his sons.

== Personal life ==
Foley married Anne Browne, daughter of John Browne, a gunfounder of Spelmonden, Kent. Together, they had four sons and two daughters:

- Thomas Foley (c. 1641–1701), whose granddaughter Elizabeth Foley married Robert Harley, later Prime Minister.
- Paul Foley (1644/5–1699), the Speaker of the House of Commons; he married Mary Lane, a daughter of Alderman John Lane of London.
- Philip Foley (1648–1716), who married Penelope Paget, a daughter of William Paget, 5th Baron Paget.
- Samuel Foley, who died young.
- Martha Foley (d. 1667), who married William Joliffe, MP for Poole and Director of the East India Company.
- Sarah Foley

Foley died on 1 October 1677 and was buried at Witley.

=== Descendants ===
Through his eldest son Thomas, he was a grandfather of Thomas Foley, 1st Baron Foley; Edward Foley, twice MP for Droitwich; Richard Foley, MP for Droitwich; Elizabeth Foley, who married Robert Harley, 1st Earl of Oxford (sixth great-grandparents of Queen Elizabeth II); Anne Foley, who married Salwey Winnington; Sarah Foley, who married Harley's brother, Edward Harley, MP; and Mary Foley, who married Sir Blundel Charlton.

Through his second son Paul, he was a grandfather of Thomas Foley, MP, and Paul Foley, also an MP.

Parliament of England
Preceded by Col. James Berry; Edward Pytts; Nicholas Lechmere; Sir Thomas Rouse, Bt; John Nanfan	Member of Parliament for Worcestershire; 1659; With: Nicholas Lechmere	Succeeded by John Wilde
Preceded by Nicholas Lechmere	Member of Parliament for Bewdley; 1660–1661	Succeeded by Sir Henry Herbert
Preceded by Sir Henry Herbert	Member of Parliament for Bewdley; 1673–1677	Succeeded by Henry Herbert, later 1st Baron Herbert of Chirbury
