= Walter Blount =

Walter Blount may refer to:

- Walter Blount (officer of arms) (1807–1894), officer of arms at the College of Arms in London
- Walter Blount (soldier) (died 1403), soldier and supporter of John of Gaunt, Duke of Lancaster
- Walter Blount, 1st Baron Mountjoy (c. 1416–1474), English politician
- Walter Blount (by 1501–43 or later), MP for Stafford
- Walter Blount (died 1561), MP for Worcestershire
- Sir Walter Blount, 1st Baronet (1594–1654), MP for Droitwich
- Sir Walter Blount, 3rd Baronet (died 1717), of the Blount baronets
- Sir Walter Blount, 6th Baronet (died 1785), of the Blount baronets
- Sir Walter Blount, 7th Baronet (1768–1803), of the Blount baronets
- Sir Walter de Sodington Blount, 9th Baronet (1833–1915), of the Blount baronets
- Sir Walter Aston Blount, 10th Baronet (1876–1958), of the Blount baronets
- Sir Walter Edward Alpin Blount, 12th Baronet (1917–2004), of the Blount baronets

== See also ==
- Blount (surname)
