= Lyttelton =

Lyttelton may refer to:

== Places ==
- Lyttelton, New Zealand, a town in New Zealand
  - Lyttelton Harbour
  - Lyttelton road tunnel, New Zealand
- Lyttelton (New Zealand electorate)
- Lyttelton, Gauteng, a suburb of Centurion in Gauteng Province, South Africa

== People ==
- Lyttelton (surname)

== Other ==
- Baron Lyttelton, title in the British peerage
- Leyton Cricket Ground (Lyttelton Ground), a cricket ground in Leyton, London
- Lyttelton Engineering Works, now Denel Land Systems, a South African arms manufacturer
- Lyttelton/Hart-Davis Letters, the published correspondence of George Lyttelton and Rupert Hart-Davis
- Lyttelton Line, a train line between Lyttelton and Christchurch
- Lyttelton Theatre, part of the British Royal National Theatre
- Lyttelton Times, a New Zealand newspaper

== See also ==
- Littleton (disambiguation)
