= Edward Pytts =

English politician

Edward Pytts (c. 1606 – 3 November 1672) was an English politician who sat in the House of Commons at various times between 1654 and 1660.

== Life ==
Pytts was the son of Sir James Pytts of Kyre who had been High Sheriff of Worcestershire. He became J.P. in 1633. His loyalties in the Civil War are not clear. On 22 May 1643 the House of Commons ordered his plate to be sold but he was a sequestration commissioner for Worcestershire in 1643 and 1647. He was questioned by the committee of sequestrations of Herefordshire in 1648 and discharged and was questioned again in 1652 when he begged discharge on the Act of Pardon.

In 1654, Pytts was elected member of parliament for Worcestershire in the First Protectorate Parliament. In that year he was reported as stating that he would be hanged before he would be subject to any instrument in Parliament, when the people had chosen him for their liberties. He was re-elected MP for Worcestershire in 1656 for the Second Protectorate Parliament. In 1659 he was elected MP for Bewdley in the Third Protectorate Parliament.

In 1660, Pytts was elected member of parliament for Leominster in the Convention Parliament. He became a justice of the peace in 1660 and a commissioner for disbanding and paying of the forces in Worcestershire.

Pytts died at the age of 66.

== Family ==
Pytts married Elizabeth Sandys, daughter of Sir Samuel Sandys MP of Omsbersley. They had the following children:

- James Pytts MP (died 1686)
- Samuel Pytts, merchant at Hamburg
- Elizabeth Pytts (died 1688), married Henry Jefferies
- Mercy Pytts (died 1699), married firstly Henry Bromley MP, secondly George Walsh MP

Parliament of England
Preceded by Richard Salwey; John James	Member of Parliament for Worcestershire; 1654–1656; With: Nicholas Lechmere; Sir Thomas Rouse, Bt; John Bridges 1654; Talbot Badger 1654; James Berry 1656; John Nanfan 1656	Succeeded by Nicholas Lechmere; Thomas Foley
Preceded by Not represented in Second Protectorate Parliament	Member of Parliament for Bewdley; 1659	Succeeded by Nicholas Lechmere
