= Worcestershire (constituency) =

Parliamentary constituency in the United Kingdom, 1801–1832

- Former county constituency for the House of Commons

1290–1832
- Seats: two

Worcestershire was a county constituency of the House of Commons of the Parliament of England then of the Parliament of Great Britain from 1707 to 1800 and of the Parliament of the United Kingdom from 1801 to 1832. It was represented until 1832 by two Members of Parliament traditionally referred to as Knights of the Shire. It was split then into two two-member divisions, for Parliamentary purposes, Worcestershire Eastern and Worcestershire Western constituencies.

== Boundaries ==
Worcestershire was one of the historic counties of England. The constituency comprised the whole county, except for the boroughs of Bewdley, Droitwich, Evesham and Worcester.

== Members of Parliament ==
=== 1294–1478 ===
Year	Location	First Member	Second Member
23 Edward I	Westminster	William de Senescal	Simon de Crombe
25 Edward I	Westminster	William de Senescal	William de Fokerham
26 Edward I	York	William de Senescal	Simon de Crombe
28 Edward I	London	Roger de Tracy	Thomas de Botteley
29 Edward I		Robert Bracy	
33 Edward I	Westminster	William de Fokerham	
34 Edward I	Great Council at Westminster	William de Fokerham	Peter Salcomb
35 Edward I	Carlisle	Peter de Salso Marisco	Walter Haket
2 Edward II	Westminster	Robert Sturmy	Robert de Somery
5 Edward II	Westminster	John de Washbourne	Edmund de Grafton
6 Edward II	Westminster	William de Galeys	William de Senescal
6 Edward II	Westminster	Edmund de Grafton	Alexander de Besford
6 Edward II	Westminster	Robert Somery	John le Rous
7 Edward II	Westminster	Edmund de Grafton	Alexander de Besford
8 Edward II	Westminster	Robert de Sturmy	Alexander de Besford
8 Edward II	Westminster	Edmund de Grafton	John de Bishopsden
9 Edward II	Lincoln	Richard de Clebury	
9 Edward II	Great Council at Westminster	Robert Somery	Thomas de Lyttelton
12 Edward II	York	Walter de Beauchamp	Walter de Blount
12 Edward II	York	Roger Mael	John Fitz Simon le Brun
15 Edward II	York	William de Bradewell	Hugh de Hawleslowe
16 Edward II	York	John de Stone	John de Offley
17 Edward II	Westminster	William de Bradewell	Alexander de Besford
19 Edward II	Westminster	Robert de Somery	Henry de Wenlond
20 Edward II	Westminster	Richard de Hawkeslowe	Robert Attwode
1 Edward III	Lincoln	John de Stone	Robert Attwode
1 Edward III	York	Richard de Hawkeslowe	John de Stone
1 Edward III	Westminster	Richard de Hawkeslowe	Robert Attwode
2 Edward III	New Sarum	Peter de Grete	Richard Bertram
2 Edward III	Northampton	Richard de Hawkeslowe	John de Stone
3 Edward III	New Sarum	Peter de Grete	
4 Edward III	Westminster	Henry de Hanbury	Robert de Graas
4 Edward III	Westminster	John de Stone	Edmund de Dunclent
5 Edward III	Westminster	William le Blount	Richard Hawkeslowe
6 Edward III	Westminster	Richard Hawkeslowe	William de Bradewell
6 Edward III	Westminster	Robert Somery	John le Rous
7 Edward III	Westminster	Peter de Grete	John de la More
7 Edward III	Westminster	William de Bradewell	Peter de Grete
8 Edward III	Westminster	Peter de Grete	John de Stone
8 Edward III	York	Peter de Grete	John de la More
9 Edward III	York	Peter de Grete	John de la More
10 Edward III	Westminster	Walter be Newington	Peter de Grete
10 Edward III	Westminster	John de Bruning	John Aleyn
11 Edward III	Westminster	John Golafre	William D'Abetot
11 Edward III	Council at Westminster	William Corbet	John de Stone
11 Edward III	Westminster	Peter de Grete	John Golafre
11 Edward III	Westminster	Peter de Grete	John Golafre
12 Edward III	Northampton (Council)	Peter de Grete	John Golafre
12 Edward III	Westminster	Walter de Berathorpe	Walter de Blount
13 Edward III	Westminster	John Sapey	John de Stone
13 Edward III	Westminster	Walter de Shekerhurst	Thomas de Loughtre
14 Edward III	Westminster	John de Lee	Walter de Newington
14 Edward III	Westminster	Badw. Frevell	John de Hull
14 Edward III	Westminster	Robert Corbet	William de Bracy
14 Edward III	Westminster	John de Evelen	John de Stone
15 Edward III	Westminster	John de Hull	Richard de Eastham
15 Edward III	Westminster	Richard de Hawkeslowe	John de Stone
17 Edward III	Westminster	Richard de Hawkeslowe	John de Stone
17 Edward III	Westminster	John le Brugh	Thomas de Slaughtre
18 Edward III	Westminster	Robert Attwode	John le Brugh
18 Edward III	Sarum	William de Bradewell	Alexander Besford
20 Edward III	Westminster	Thomas de Slaughtre	William de Norton
21 Edward III	Westminster	John de Hull	John de Brugh (Brayne)
22 Edward III	Westminster	John de Lokynton	William de Norton
22 Edward III	Westminster	John de Hull	John de Brugh
24 Edward III	Westminster	Walter de Shekerhurst	Thomas Cassy
25 Edward III	Westminster	Walter de Shekerhurst	Edward le Brugge
26 Edward III	Westminster	John de Beauchamp of Holt	John de Harley
26 & 27 Edward III	Council at Westminster	Gilbert Chasteleyn	
28 Edward III	Westminster	Gilbert Chasteleyn	William de Shakenhrust
29 Edward III	Westminster	John de Beauchamp	John Musard
31 Edward III	Westminster	Robert de Bracy	John de Lokynton
32 Edward III	Westminster	Robert de Bracy	William le Spencer
34 Edward III	Westminster	William de Shakenhurst	Roger le Brugge
34 Edward III	Westminster	Robert Bracy	Roger de Brugge
35 Edward III	Westminster	Robert Bracy	Roger de Brugge
36 Edward III	Westminster	Lionius de Perton	Edward Kerdiffe
37 Edward III	Westminster	Thomas Foliot	Reginald de Hanbury
38 Edward III	Westminster	Robert Bracy	Robert Russel
39 Edward III	Westminster	Robert Bracy	Robert Russel
40 Edward III	Westminster	Robert de la More	Nicholas Bottham
42 Edward III	Westminster	Henry Sturmy	Thomas de la Rivere
42 Edward III	Westminster	John Horsley	Nicholas Moxhall
45 Edward III	Westminster	Richard Fyton	John Meyn
45 Edward III	Council at Westminster	Richard Fyton	John Meyn
46 Edward III	Westminster	John Atte Wode	Richard Fyton
47 Edward III	Westminster	John Atte Wode	Edmund de Brugge
50 Edward III	Westminster	Sir John Atte Wode	Sir Richard Fyton
51 Edward III	Westminster	John de Sapy	John Beauchamp
1 Richard II	Westminster	Sir Richard Fyton	John Beauchamp
2 Richard II	Gloucester	Sir William Cokesey	Sir John Russell
2 Richard II	Westminster	Sir William Wasteneys	Sir John Russell
2 Richard II	Westminster	Sir John Atte Wode	John Beauchamp of Holt
2 Richard II	Northampton	Sir John Atte Wode	John Beauchamp of Holt
5 Richard II	Westminster	Henry de Arden	John de Sapy
5 Richard II	Westminster	Sir Richard Fyton	John de Sapy
6 Richard II	Westminster	Alexander de Besford	
6 Richard II	Westminster	Ralf Stafford	Roger de Hanbury
7 Richard II	Westminster	Sir Nicholas Sellyng	Henry Bruyn
7 Richard II	Sarum	Sir John Herle	--- de Stafford
8 Richard II	Westminster	Sir Walter Cokesey	Sir John Herle
9 Richard II	Westminster	Sir John de Sapy	Henry Bruyn
10 Richard II	Westminster	Sir Nicholas Sellyng (Lilling)	Henry Bruyn
11 Richard II	Westminster	Sir Nicholas Sellyng (Lilling)	Sir Hugh Cheyne
12 Richard II	Westminster	Sir Nicholas Sellyng (Lilling)	Alexander de Besford
13 Richard II	Westminster	Sir Nicholas Sellyng (Lilling)	Sir Hugh Cheyne
14 Richard II	Westminster	Sir Nicholas Sellyng (Lilling)	Sir Hugh Cheyne
15 Richard II	Westminster	Alexander Besford	Henry Bruyn
16 Richard II	Winchester	Nicholas Sellyng (Lilling)	William Spernore
17 Richard II	Westminster	Richard Thurgrym	William Spernore
18 Richard II	Westminster	Alexander Besford	Robert Russell
20 Richard II	Westminster	William Spernore	Richard Ruyhall
21 Richard II	Westminster	Sir John Russell	Richard Ruyhall
1 Henry IV	Westminster	John Blount	William Spernore
2 Henry IV	Westminster	Sir John Beauchamp	Ralf Stafford
3 Henry IV	Westminster	Thomas Throgmorton	John Brace
4 Henry IV	Westminster	Thomas Throgmorton	John Bracy
5 Henry IV	Westminster	Sir Simon Blount	John Washbourne
6 Henry IV	Coventry	John Beauchamp	Ralf Stafford
8 Henry IV	Westminster	Ralph Ardern	Thomas Hodyngton
9 Henry IV	Gloucester	Sir William Beauchamp	Richard Ruyhall
1 Henry V	Westminster	William Beauchamp of Powick	Sir John Phelip
2 Henry V (Apr)	Leicester	William Beauchamp of Powick	John Beauchamp
1414 (Nov)		John Throckmorton	John Wood
3 Henry V	Westminster	Humphrey Stafford	John Brace
3 Henry V	Westminster	William Beauchamp of Powick	William Russel
5 Henry V	Westminster	William Wollashall	Thomas Morant
1419		John Brace	Thomas Morant
8 Henry V	Westminster	John Throckmorton	John Weston
8 Henry V	Westminster	William Beauchamp	Richard Ruyhall
1421 (Apr)	Westminster	William Wollashall	John Wood
1421 (Dec)	Westminster	Walter Corbet	John Brace
1422	Westminster	John Throckmorton	John Vampage
2 Henry VI	Westminster	William Wollashall	John Wood
4 Henry VI	Westminster	Sir William Lichfield	Thomas Heuster
5 Henry VI	Leicester	Humphrey Stafford of Grafton	John Vampage
8 Henry VI	Westminster	John Huband	John Vampage
9 Henry VI	Westminster	William Wollashall	John Wood
13 Henry VI	Westminster	John Wood	Robert Russel
20 Henry VI	Westminster	Hugh Cokesey	Walter Skull
25 Henry VI	Cambridge	Humphrey Stafford	Walter Skull
27 Henry VI	Westminster	Humphrey Stafford	Thomas Throckmorton
28 Henry VI	Westminster	Humphrey Stafford	Thomas Windeslawe
29 Henry VI	Westminster	Humphrey Stafford	Thomas Throckmorton
31 Henry VI	Reading	Sir Walter Skull	Humphrey Stafford
33 Henry VI	Westminster	Humphrey Stafford	Fulk Stafford
35 Henry VI	Westminster	John Stafford	Fulk Stafford
6 Edward IV	Westminster	Renefred Arundel	Thomas Lygon
12 Edward IV	Westminster	Richard Hyde	Thomas Lygon
17 Edward IV	Westminster	William Berkley	John Acton

Source: Treadway Russell Nash.

=== 1479–1552 ===
Parliament	First member	Second member
1510-1532	Not known	
1529	Sir Gilbert Talbot	John Russell
1536	Not known	
1539 (30 Henry VIII)	Sir John Russell	Sir John Pakington
1542 (33 Henry VIII)	Sir Gilbert Talbot, died and replaced by Thomas Russell	William Sheldon
1547	Thomas Russell	William Sheldon

=== 1553–1649 ===
Year	Location	First Member	Second Member
7 Edward VI 1553	Westminster	Walter Blount	Francis Savage
1 Mary 1553	Westminster	Sir Thomas Russell	John Lyttelton
1 Mary 1554	Westminster	John Bourne	William Sheldon
1 Mary 1554	Westminster	Sir John Bourne	Walter Blount
2&3 Ph & Mary	Westminster	Sir John Bourne	William Sheldon
4&5 Ph & Mary	Westminster	Sir John Bourne	Sir Thomas Baskerville
1559	Westminster	Sir Thomas Russell	Thomas Blount of Kidderminster
1562	Westminster	Thomas Blount of Kidderminster	Ralph Sheldon
1571	Westminster	Sir Thomas Russell	Gilbert Lyttelton
1572	Westminster	Gilbert Lyttelton	John Talbot
1584	Westminster	John Russell	John Lyttelton (II)
1586	Westminster	John Russell	John Lyttelton (II)
1588	Westminster	Sir John Russell	William Lygon
1593	Westminster	Sir Henry Bromley	William Walsh
1597	Westminster	John Lyttelton (II)	Edmund Colles
1601	Westminster	Thomas Leighton	Thomas Russell
1604	Westminster	Sir Henry Bromley	Sir William Lygon (died 1609) repl Sir Samuel Sandys
1614	Westminster	Sir Thomas Bromley	Sir Samuel Sandys
1621	Westminster	Sir Thomas Lyttelton	Sir Samuel Sandys
1624	Westminster	Sir Thomas Lyttelton	Sir Walter Devereux, Bt
1625	Westminster and Oxford	Sir Thomas Lyttelton	William Russell
1626	Westminster	Sir Thomas Lyttelton	Sir John Rouse
1628	Westminster	Thomas Coventry	Sir Thomas Bromley
April 1640	Westminster	Sir Thomas Lyttelton	Sir John Pakington, 2nd Baronet
November 1640	Westminster	John Wilde	Humphrey Salwey

Source: TR Nash

=== Commonwealth Parliaments ===
!Year	First Member	Second Member	Third Member	Fourth Member	Fifth Member
1653	Richard Salwey	John James			
1654	Sir Thomas Rouse, Bt	Edward Pytts	Nicholas Lechmere	John Bridges	Talbot Badger
1656	Col. James Berry	Edward Pytts	Nicholas Lechmere	Sir Thomas Rouse, Bt	John Nanfan
1658-9	Nicholas Lechmere	Thomas Foley			

Source: T. R. Nash, Collections for a History of Worcestershire (1783)

=== MPs 1660–1832 ===
Election	First member	First party	Second member	Second party
1660	Henry Bromley		John Talbot	
1661	Sir John Pakington, 2nd Bt	Royalist	Samuel Sandys	
1679	Thomas Foley		Samuel Sandys	
1681	Thomas Foley		Bridges Nanfan	
1685	Sir John Pakington, 3rd Bt	Tory	James Pytts	
1689	Sir James Rushout, Bt		Thomas Foley	
1690	Sir John Pakington, 4th Bt	Tory	Thomas Foley	
1695	Edwin Sandys		Thomas Foley	
1698	Sir John Pakington, 4th Bt	Tory	William Walsh	
1701	Sir John Pakington, 4th Bt	Tory	William Bromley	Whig
1702	Sir John Pakington, 4th Bt	Tory	William Walsh	
1705	Sir John Pakington, 4th Bt	Tory	William Bromley	Whig
1707	Sir John Pakington, 4th Bt	Tory	Sir Thomas Winford, Bt	
1710	Sir John Pakington, 4th Bt	Tory	Samuel Pytts	
1715	Sir John Pakington, 4th Bt	Tory	Thomas Vernon	
1720	Sir John Pakington, 4th Bt	Tory	Sir Thomas Lyttelton, Bt	
1727	Sir Herbert Pakington, Bt	Tory	Sir Thomas Lyttelton, Bt	
1734	Sir Herbert Pakington, Bt	Tory	Edmund Lechmere	Tory
1741	Edmund Pytts (I)	Tory	Edmund Lechmere	Tory
1747	Edmund Pytts (I)	Tory	Viscount Deerhurst	
1751 by-election	Edmund Pytts (I)	Tory	John Bulkeley Coventry	
1753 by-election	Edmund Pytts (II)	Tory	John Bulkeley Coventry	
1761	John Ward		William Dowdeswell	Whig
1774	Edward Foley		William Dowdeswell	Whig
1775 by-election	Edward Foley		William Lygon	
1803 by-election	John Ward	Tory	William Lygon	
1806 by-election	John Ward	Tory	William Lygon	
1806	William Lyttelton		William Lygon	
1816 by-election	William Lyttelton		Henry Lygon	
1820	Sir Thomas Winnington, Bt		Henry Lygon	
1830	Thomas Foley	Whig	Henry Lygon	
1831	Thomas Foley	Whig	Frederick Spencer	Whig
1832	constituency divided. See Worcestershire Eastern and Worcestershire Western			

== Elections ==
The county franchise, from 1430, was held by the owners of freehold land valued at 40 shillings or more. Each voter had as many votes as there were seats to be filled. Votes had to be cast by a spoken declaration, in public, at the hustings, which took place in the county town of Worcester. The expense and difficulty of voting at only one location in the county, together with the lack of a secret ballot contributed to the corruption and intimidation of voters, which was widespread in the unreformed British political system.

The expense, to candidates, of contested elections encouraged the leading families of the county to agree on the candidates to be returned unopposed whenever possible. Contested county elections were therefore unusual.

== See also ==
- Leigh Rayment's Historical List of MPs – Constituencies beginning with "W" (part 5)
- List of former United Kingdom Parliament constituencies
- Unreformed House of Commons
