= Alexander Besford =

English politician

Alexander Besford (died c. 1400) was an English politician. He sat as MP for Worcestershire in October 1382, September 1388, 1391, and 1395.

== Political career ==
He also served as commissioner to take custody of two royal wards in Gloucestershire in June 1373; commissioner to put down rebellion in Worcestershire in December 1382; commissioner of arrest in Gloucestershire in February 1386; commissioner of array in Worcestershire in March 1392, and December 1399.

He also served as alnager of Worcestershire from 1 March 1377 till February 1379; justice of the peace of Worcestershire from 20 December 1382 till c. 1383, 27 April 1386 till July 1389, and 14 March 1393 till June 1394; Steward of the liberties of Westminster Abbey by probably May 1383 till c. 1400, and verderer of Feckenham Forest in Worcestershire before June 1393.

== Family ==
He was possibly the son of Alexander Besford by his wife, Joan. He married a co-heiress of a Lench of Lench, Worcestershire and they had one daughter. Before July 1386, he married his second wife, Beatrice (died 1403/4), the widow of Thomas Bassingbourne of Hoddesdonbury and they had two daughters.
