= John Boxall =

English churchman and secretary of state to Mary I of England

Sir John Boxall (died 1571) was an English churchman and secretary of state to Mary I of England.

== Catholic statesman ==
He was a native of Bramshott in Hampshire. After studying at Winchester School he was admitted a perpetual fellow of New College, Oxford, in 1542, where he took his degrees in arts. He took orders, but, being opposed to the Protestant Reformation, he did not act as minister during the reign of Edward VI.

On Queen Mary's accession he was not appointed her majesty's secretary of state, but dean of Ely (also archdeacon and prebendary there). He continued to a primary influence in the Marian church first as prebendary of Winchester, and Warden of Winchester College (1554) as successor to John White. Boxall was one of the divines who were chosen to preach at St Paul's Cross in support of the Catholic religion; John Pits relates that on one occasion a bystander hurled a dagger at him, other writers assert that this happened to Dr. Pendleton, but John Stow that Gilbert Bourne occupied the pulpit on the occasion referred to.

On 23 September 1556, Boxall was sworn as a member of the privy council; also as one of the masters of requests and a councillor of that court. Finally elevated by Queen Mary's favour he was appointed Secretary of State in March 1557. In July, he was made Dean of Peterborough; on 20 December following he was installed Dean of Norwich, and about the same time Dean of Windsor. He was elected register of the Order of the Garter on 6 February 1558, and in 1558 was created Doctor of Divinity and appointed prebendary of York and Salisbury. As the Queen Mary lay dying he was already one of the richest men in England; allowed ten retainers, he was one of the overseers of Cardinal Pole's will.

=== Declining fortunes ===
Boxall was removed from the office of secretary of state by Queen Elizabeth, on her accession, to make way for William Cecil, to whom he acted helpfully. Having been deprived of his ecclesiastical preferments, he was on 18 June 1560 committed to the Tower of London by Archbishop Matthew Parker and other members of the ecclesiastical commission; subsequently he was in custody at Lambeth Palace with Thomas Thirleby, Cuthbert Tunstall and other Catholics. He was removed at different periods to Bromley and Beaksbourne, remaining still in the archbishop's charge. On 20 July 1569, Boxall, then in custody at Lambeth, wrote to Sir William Cecil requesting leave to visit his mother. Eventually the ailing Boxall was allowed to go to the house of a relative in London, where he died on 3 March 1571. His brothers Edmund and Richard were appointed administrators of his property.

== Works ==
He published a Latin sermon preached in a convocation of the clergy in 1555 and printed at London in the same year. He also wrote an Oration in the Praise of the Kinge of Spaine, left in manuscript in Latin, and probably composed in May or June 1555, on the report of the queen having been delivered of a prince.

Political offices
| Preceded by Sir William Petre; Sir John Bourne | Secretary of State; 1557–1558; With: Sir John Bourne | Succeeded by Sir William Cecil |
