= Humphrey Salwey =

English politician

Humphrey Salwey (1575–1652) was an English politician who sat in the House of Commons from 1640 to 1652. He supported the Parliamentary side in the English Civil War.

Salwey was the son of Arthur Salwey of Stanford Court at Stanford-on-Teme, Worcestershire and his wife Mary Searle, daughter of Thomas Searle of London. He was educated at Brasenose College, Oxford, being awarded BA on 16 February 1593 and entered Inner Temple in November 1594. He was fined £25 on 6 July 1630 for refusing a knighthood on the coronation of King Charles I. In March 1637 he was appointed commissioner to compensate the Avon proprietors. He was a Justice of the Peace for Worcestershire.

In April 1640, Salwey was elected member of parliament for Worcestershire in the Long Parliament. Salwey was appointed a commissioner for Worcestershire in 1643 and was appointed First (or King's) Remembrancer by parliament on 3 August 1644. He was made a member of the general assessment committee in October 1644 and was appointed parliamentary commissioner to reside with the army in Scotland on 18 July 1645. In June 1646 he was appointed a member of the committee on scandalous offences. He was a commissioner to try the King in January 1649, but did not act. In May 1649 he was on the Navy Commission.

Salwey died in 1652 and was buried in Westminster Abbey on 20 December 1652.

Salwey married Anne Littleton, daughter of Sir Edward Littleton [1563-1610], M.P. and Margaret Devereux [Anne, daughter of Sir Edward Littleton and Mary Fisher was the 2nd wife of Thomas Holte, 1st Bt, see CB I, p. 105] of Pillaton Hall, Staffordshire. Their son Richard also fought for parliament and succeeded to the seat at Worcestershire. His son Edward succeeded to the estate at Stanford and was MP for Droitwich.

Parliament of England
Parliament suspended since 1629	Member of Parliament for Worcestershire; 1640; With: John Wilde	Succeeded by Richard Salwey; John James
