= William Beauchamp (MP for Worcestershire) =

English politician (died c.1421)

Sir William Beauchamp (died c. 1421) was an English politician. He sat as MP for Worcestershire in 1407, May 1413, April 1414 and March 1416.

He was knighted by 20 December 1399.

== Political career ==
He also served as commissioner of inquiry concerning trespasses in Feckenham in Worcestershire in March 1392, concerning misdemeanours of James Clifford and Anselm Guise in Gloucestershire in July and August 1401, concerning murder possibly in Herefordshire in January 1403, concerning unauthorized alienations in Gloucestershire in July 1405 and January 1406, concerning contributors to a subsidy in January 1412, concerning lollards in Worcestershire in January 1414, concerning concealments in Gloucestershire in February 1415; commissioner of oyer and terminer in Worcestershire in April and July 1394, February 1395, in Gloucestershire in June 1402, in Worcestershire in December 1409; commissioner to make proclamation of Henry IV's intention to govern well in Gloucestershire in May 1402; commissioner to victual the castles of Cardiff and Newport, Wales in September 1403; commissioner of arrest in Gloucestershire in April 1404; commissioner to raise royal loans in January 1420.

He also served as constable of Gloucester castle from 24 December 1392 till his death; Sheriff of Worcestershire from 8 November 1401 till 29 November 1402, in Gloucestershire from 5 November 1403 till 13 February 1405, 6 November 1413 till 10 November 1414; justice of the peace of Worcestershire from 28 August 1405 till January 1406, 8 July 1420 till his death, in Gloucestershire from 4 July 1406 till February 1407 and 26 November 1416 till March 1419; and chamberlain to Humphrey, Duke of Gloucester by April 1419.

== Family ==
He was the son and heir of Sir John Beauchamp by his wife, Elizabeth (died 1411). He was the elder brother of Sir Walter Beauchamp. c. 1392, he married Katherine, possibly the daughter of Sir Gerard Usflete, they had one son and one daughter.
