= Rouse baronets =

Extinct baronetcy in the Baronetage of England

The Rouse of Rouse Lench Baronetcy was created in the Baronetage of England on 23 July 1641 for Thomas Rouse of Rouse Lench Court, Rous Lench, Worcestershire.

On the death of the 4th Baronet in 1721 the Baronetcy was extinct. His estates passed to firstly to his full sister who died unmarried, then to Thomas Phillips a descendant of a half sister and later to a distant cousin Charles William Boughton, who in 1791 was created a Baronet ( see Boughton baronets).

He sold the Worcestershire estates in 1876.

== Rouse baronets, of Rouse Lench (1641) ==
Escutcheon of the Rouse baronets of Rouse Lench

- Sir Thomas Rouse, 1st Baronet (1608–1676)
- Sir Edward Rouse, 2nd Baronet (died 1677)
- Sir Francis Rouse, 3rd Baronet (died 1687)
- Sir Thomas Rouse, 4th Baronet (1664–1721)
