= Tender of Union =

Declaration uniting Scotland with the Commonwealth of England

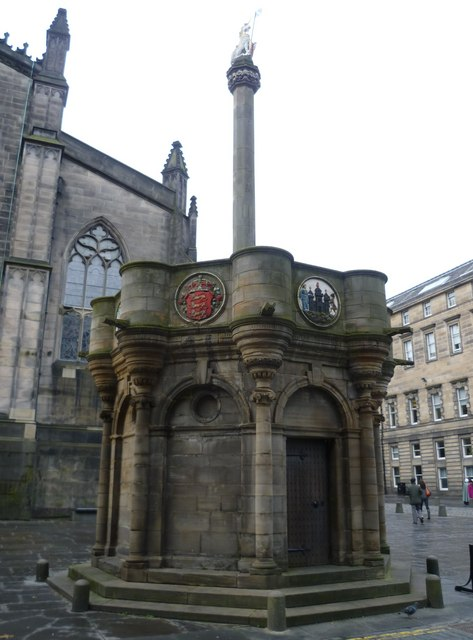
The Mercat Cross in Edinburgh, near to which the Tender of Union was proclaimed.

The Tender of Union was a declaration of the Parliament of England during the Interregnum following the War of the Three Kingdoms stating that Scotland would cease to have an independent parliament and would join England in its emerging Commonwealth republic.

The English parliament passed the declaration on 28 October 1651 and after a number of interim steps an Act of Union was passed on 26 June 1657. The proclamation of the Tender of Union in Scotland on 4 February 1652 regularised the de facto annexation of Scotland by England following the English victory in the recent Anglo-Scottish war. Under the terms of the Tender of Union and the final enactment, the Scottish Parliament was permanently dissolved and Scotland was given 30 seats in the Westminster Parliament. This act, like all the others passed during the Interregnum, was repealed by both Scottish and English parliaments upon the Restoration of monarchy under Charles II.

== Declaration and reaction ==
On 28 October 1651 the English Parliament issued the Declaration of the Parliament of the Commonwealth of England, concerning the Settlement of Scotland, in which it was stated that "Scotland shall, and may be incorporated into, and become one Common-wealth with this England". Eight English commissioners were appointed, Oliver St John, Sir Henry Vane, Richard Salwey, George Fenwick, John Lambert, Richard Deane, Robert Tichborne, and George Monck, to further the matter. The English parliamentary commissioners travelled to Scotland and at Mercat Cross in Edinburgh on 4 February 1652, proclaimed that the Tender of Union was in force in Scotland. By 30 April 1652 the representatives of the shires and Royal burgers of Scotland had agreed to the terms which included an oath that Scotland and England be subsumed into one Commonwealth. On 13 April 1652—between the proclamation and the last of the shires to agree to the terms—a bill for an Act for incorporating Scotland into one Commonwealth with England was given a first and a second reading in Rump Parliament but it failed to return from its committee stage before the Rump was dissolved. A similar act was introduced into the Barebones Parliament but it too failed to be enacted before that parliament was dissolved.

== Approval by the Lord Protector and Parliament ==
On 12 April 1654, the Ordinance for uniting Scotland into one Commonwealth with England issued by the Lord Protector Oliver Cromwell and proclaimed in Scotland by the military governor of Scotland, General George Monck. The Ordinance did not become an Act of Union until it was approved by the Second Protectorate Parliament on 26 June 1657 in an act that enabled several bills.

== See also ==
- Acts of Union 1707
- Scotland in the Wars of the Three Kingdoms
