= John Russell (died 1405) =

Sir John Russell (died 1405), of Strensham in Worcestershire where he held the manor and advowson, was an English landowner, soldier, administrator, courtier and politician.

== Origins ==
His family had been living at Strensham since before 1283, when his great-grandfather James Russell had licence to create an oratory in his house there, and also owned the Worcestershire manors of Peopleton and Dormston. Born before 1357, he was the son and heir of the MP Robert Russell, of Strensham, and his wife Catherine, daughter of John Vampage, of Pershore in Worcestershire.

== Career ==
Before inheriting the family estates, he probably saw military service in Ireland under Sir William Windsor, the King's Lieutenant there, sailing across in 1373. Later, he was given the lease of lands in Northamptonshire forfeited in 1378 by Windsor's wife Alice Perrers, the disgraced mistress of King Edward III. In that year he had been knighted, and was elected MP for Worcestershire in both the 1378 and 1379 Parliaments.

By 1382 he had married and the next year he became a retainer of Thomas Beauchamp, Earl of Warwick. Four years later he transferred to the Royal Household as a King's knight, with a lifetime salary. During the Merciless Parliament, he obtained licence to crenellate his house at Strensham, of which in 1924 only the moats remained. King Richard II, on regaining control of the government, in 1389 gave him the lease for life of Deerhurst Priory in Gloucestershire.

In 1390 he was a member of the English team in the jousts against French knights at Calais and In 1391 King Richard made him Master of the Horse. Mixing at the highest levels of government, in 1395 he appointed the treasurer and future archbishop Roger Walden as one of his feofees. His duties took him to Ireland again, maybe to buy horses, and in 1396 he took some horses to Paris as a gift from the King for the French king's daughter Isabella, soon to be Richard's second wife.

About this time he made a second marriage to a wealthy widow, who died shortly after. In 1397, again returned to Parliament for Worcestershire, he profited from the downfall of the Earl of Warwick by acquiring several of the Earl's estates in Worcestershire. Giving up his office of Master of the Horse, he took on more administrative and judicial duties, being appointed a member of the King's Council and sitting on the special parliamentary committee that investigated treason charges against Henry of Bolingbroke, the future King, and Thomas Mowbray, Duke of Norfolk. Also in 1397 he was appointed a justice of the peace for Worcestershire, Gloucestershire, Suffolk, Oxfordshire and Warwickshire, but lost all these in 1399 except for Worcestershire.

At the end of 1398 he was married for the third time to a widow of three husbands who had extensive lands in several counties, including Birmingham and Maxstoke in Warwickshire. Although he loyally supported the Duke of York's efforts to combat the rebellion of Henry of Bolingbroke in 1399, he escaped serious reprisals once Henry was king. He was not removed from the Worcestershire commission of the peace and was summoned to a council meeting in 1401.

He made his will on 7 April 1404 and died at his second wife’s home of Letheringham in Suffolk on 31 January 1405, his body being taken to Strensham for burial. His memorial brass in the chancel floor showed a knight in armour under a crocketed ogee canopy with side pinnacles and named his three wives. His widow lived on, holding his lands, until 1423. His arms were: Argent a cheveron between three crosslets fitchy sable.

== Family ==
Before October 1382 he married Agnes, whose family name is unrecorded, and they had six children, including:

- William, the eldest son and heir, who sat as MP for Worcestershire in March 1416 but was dead by March 1419.
- John, died after 1423.
- Margaret, married Sir Ralph Rochford, of Stoke Rochford.
- Elizabeth, married Sir Robert Wingfield, of Letheringham, and was mother of Sir Robert Wingfield.

His second wife was Margaret (died 1397), daughter of Sir Hugh Hastings, of Elsing in Norfolk, and widow of Sir John Wingfield, of Letheringham in Suffolk.

Thirdly, in about January 1399, he married Elizabeth (died 1423), daughter and heiress of William Planche, of Haversham in Buckinghamshire, and widow of (1) Sir John Birmingham, (2) Robert Grey, 4th Baron Grey of Rotherfield, and (3) John Clinton, 3rd Baron Clinton. She was also heiress of her childless elder sister Catherine (died 1398), widow of Sir Bernard Brocas (died 1395).

John Russell, an MP for Herefordshire who became well known as a lawyer and was elected Speaker of the Parliaments of 1423 and 1432, was possibly an illegitimate son.
