= The Littletons =

The Littletons is the name of a cluster of villages in Worcestershire, England. The title may refer to:

- North and Middle Littleton, a civil parish containing the villages of North and Middle Littleton
- South Littleton, a larger village and civil parish

== See also ==
- Littleton (disambiguation)
