= William Hatteclyffe =

English surgeon and diplomat

William Hatteclyffe (ca. 1417–1480), sometimes spelt in other ways, such as Hattclyff, Hatcliff, and even Atcliff, was an English physician, diplomat, and King's Secretary.

Hatteclyffe was one of a clerical dynasty, and there are other men of the same name with whom he should not be confused, including the William Hatteclyffe (died 1518 or 1519) who was Clerk of Accounts in the household of Henry VII and Under-treasurer of Ireland, and his cousin Dr William Hatteclyffe, a 16th-century Rector of St Mary-at-Hill, London.

== King's servant ==
Hatteclyffe was educated at the University of Cambridge, where he became a Fellow of Peterhouse in 1437 and a founding fellow of King's in 1441/42. In 1446 he was attending lectures in medicine at the University of Padua, where he graduated as a Doctor of Medicine in March 1447. Returning to Cambridge, he is recorded as Bursar of King's later the same year.

By November 1452 Hatteclyffe had been appointed as a physician to King Henry VI and was in receipt of a stipend of forty pounds a year. On 15 March 1454 he was ordered to attend the king during an illness, and by 1457 he was also physician to the king's consort, Margaret of Anjou. In 1456 he was a signatory of the so-called "alchemy petition" seeking a remedy for the king's ills. By 1461 Hatteclyffe had transferred his allegiance to the Yorkists, led by Edward, Duke of York, and after the Second Battle of St Albans of 17 February 1461, a disaster for the House of York, Hatteclyffe took ship for Ireland. His ship was captured by a French vessel, and he was held for ransom, but within a few days, in a speedy reversal of his fortunes, Warwick the Kingmaker had gained control of London and Westminster, and on 4 March 1461 he proclaimed the Duke of York king as Edward IV. The new king then provided funds from the Treasury for Hatteclyffe's ransom, and he was released. In January 1461/62 he was paid almost a year's stipend as king's physician, with effect from the previous March.

In September 1464 King Edward IV sent Hatteclyffe on a diplomatic mission to Francis I, Duke of Brittany, and by January 1465/66 he had become King's Secretary. While continuing to serve as Secretary and also as a king's physician from time to time, Hatteclyffe was sent on many more diplomatic missions, especially to the Hanseatic League and Burgundy, Denmark and Scotland. Indeed, from 1464 to 1476 he spent a large part of his time overseas. "In particular William Hatteclyffe was constantly employed in negotiations with Brittany, Burgundy and the Hanse towns between 1464 and 1476, and spent a very considerable proportion of these years abroad." In 1468 Hatteclyffe "Our Secretary and Councillor" alongside Richard Beauchamp, Bishop of Salisbury, successfully negotiated a marriage between King Edward's sister Margaret of York and Charles the Bold.

In October 1470, when Henry VI briefly regained the throne of England, Hatteclyffe was one of those who was speedily arrested and imprisoned. However, on 11 April 1471 King Edward was restored, and Hatteclyffe was then released and promoted, not merely returning as King's Secretary but also being appointed to the Privy Council and as Master of Requests. In 1473 Hatteclyffe acted for Queen Elizabeth Woodville in business concerning her cousin Anne Haute. Secretary Hatteclyffe attended accompanied the king on a royal progression to France, a man-at-arms for protection, and 13 archers paid for three months. He received expenses of 2 shilling per day, as well as £36 8s for his staff. In his were also retinue were a gentleman and servant. The following year he completed his last diplomatic mission. In 1478 he gave up his house in the City of London and took one in Westminster. In June 1480 he was joined as King's secretary by Oliver King, acting as his coadjutor, on account of Hatteclyffe's age and infirmity.

Hatteclyffe died in the winter of 1480 and was buried in Westminster Abbey, but the date of his death is uncertain. He left property in Southwark, Deptford, Rotherhithe, and East Greenwich.

== See also ==
- Secretary of State (England)
- Privy Council
- Master of Requests (England)

== Notes ==
=== References ===
Political offices
Preceded by Thomas Manning	Secretary of State (England)	Succeeded by Oliver King
Unknown	Master of the Court of Requests unknown	Unknown
Preceded by	Privy Councillor	Succeeded by
Catholic Church titles
