= John Bourne (died 1575) =

English politician, knight, MP-Worcestershire, SOS (England) to Queen Mary 1st

Sir John Bourne (by 1518 – May 1575), of Worcestershire, was an English politician and privy councillor to Queen Mary I.

== Family ==
Bourne's family were minor gentry from Worcestershire; he was probably the son of Walter Bourne of Wick, Worcestershire. He was more distantly related Gilbert Bourne, bishop of Bath and Wales than has often been thought.

== Career ==
He was educated at Lincoln's Inn. By 1539 he was one of the gentlemen in the household of William FitzWilliam, 1st Earl of Southampton. He may have sat as Member (MP) of the Parliament of England for Guildford in 1539; he was certainly one of the men nominated by the earl, but the return is missing. He was elected for Midhurst in 1542 through the earl's patronage. He also became a clerk of the privy seal under Southampton. In 1545 he was elected for Preston, a Duchy of Lancaster borough, presumably through the influence of Sir John Gage.

He leased the manor of Battenhall, Worcester from the prior of Worcester Cathedral. At the Dissolution of the Monasteries the manor was excluded from the grant of lands to the dean and chapter and granted to Bourne. In 1545 he became a justice of the peace in Worcestershire.

He was knighted on 2 October 1553 and served as a principal Secretary of State (England) (1553-1558) under Queen Mary I. His status locally and nationally ensured his election for Worcester in October 1553, and Worcestershire in April 1554, November 1554, 1555 and 1558. He acquired the manor of Holt, Worcestershire in 1557-9.

In Elizabeth I's reign Bourne, 'a great advocate for the old religion, and violent enemy to the reformers', was engaged in a feud with the bishop of Worcester Edwin Sandys.

== Marriage and Issue ==
He married Dorothy, daughter of Richard Lygon of Madresfield by 1546. They had two children, who survived to adulthood:

- Anthony married Elizabeth Horne of Oxfordshire, whose 'chequered career' led to imprisonment and the loss of his estate;
- Margaret married Sir William Clerke of North Weston, a hamlet of Great Haseley, Oxfordshire.

Bourne died in May 1575. His wife survived him.

Political offices
Preceded by Sir William Cecil; Sir William Petre	Secretary of State; 1553–1558; With: Sir William Petre 1553–1557; John Boxall 1557–1558	Succeeded by Sir William Cecil
