= Secretary of State (England) =

Appointed position in the English government

England Secretary of State
- Coat of Arms of the Kingdom of England from 1603 to 1649
- Member of: Privy Council
- Seat: Westminster, London
- Appointer: The English Monarch
- Term length: No fixed term
- Formation: 1253–1645
- First holder: John Maunsell
- Final holder: George Digby, 2nd Earl of Bristol

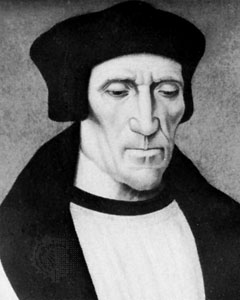
Richard Foxe, King's Secretary 1485 to 1487

In the Kingdom of England, the title of Secretary of State came into being near the end of the reign of Elizabeth I, the usual title before that having been King's Clerk, King's Secretary, or Principal Secretary.

From the time of Henry VIII, there were usually two secretaries of state. After the restoration of the monarchy of 1660, the two posts were specifically designated as the Secretary of State for the Northern Department and the Secretary of State for the Southern Department. Both dealt with home affairs and they divided foreign affairs between them.

== History ==
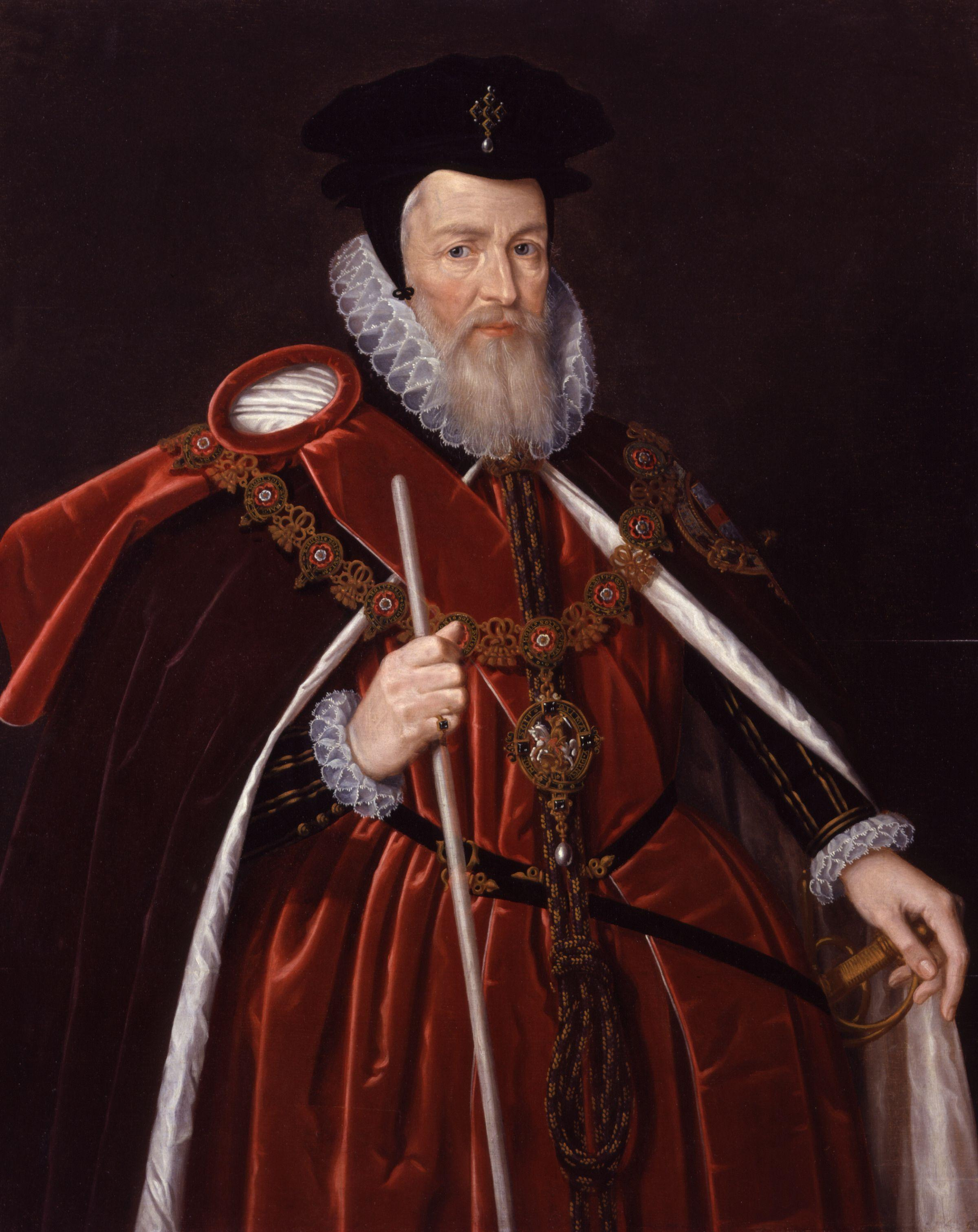
William Cecil, Lord Burghley, a Secretary of Queen Elizabeth

The medieval kings of England had a clerical servant, at first known as their Clerk, later as their Secretary. The primary duty of this office was carrying on the monarch's official correspondence, but in varying degrees the holder also advised the Crown, and by the early fourteenth century, the position was in effect the third most powerful office of state in England, ranking after the Lord Chancellor.

Meanwhile, most administrative business went through the royal household (particularly the Wardrobe), and the secretary's role expanded to include advisory, diplomatic, and military responsibilities. The Privy Seal's warrants increased rapidly in quantity and frequency during the late Middle Ages. The Signet warrant, kept by the Keeper of the Privy Seal, could be used to stamp documents on authority of chancery and on behalf of the Chancellor. During wartime, the king took his privy seal with him wherever he went. Its controller was the Secretary, who served on military and diplomatic missions; and the Wardrobe clerks assumed an even greater importance.

Until the reign of King Henry VIII (1509–1547), there was usually only one such secretary at a time, but by the end of Henry's reign there was also a second secretary. At about the end of the reign of Henry's daughter Elizabeth I (1558–1603), the secretaries began to be called "Secretary of State". Subsequently, after the Restoration of 1660, the two posts came to be known as the Secretary of State for the Northern Department and the Secretary of State for the Southern Department (each responsible for different regions of Europe). Both of the secretaries dealt with internal matters, but they also divided foreign affairs between them. One dealt with northern Europe (the mostly Protestant states) and the other with southern Europe. Following the Glorious Revolution of 1688, the Cabinet took over the practical direction of affairs previously undertaken by the Privy Council, and the two secretaries of state gained ever more responsible powers.

== List of officeholders ==
For the Secretaries of State following the Union with Scotland of 1707, see Secretary of State for the Northern Department, Secretary of State for the Southern Department, and Secretary of State (United Kingdom)

King's Clerk

- John Maunsell (1253–1263?)
- Francis Accursii (1277?–1282?)
- John de Benstede (1299)
- William Melton (1308)
- William Trussell (1332)
- William of Wykeham (1360)

King's Secretary

- Robert Braybrooke (1377–1381)
- John Bacon (1381–1385)
- Richard Mitford (1385–1387)
- John Profit (1402–1412)
- John Stone (1415 – c. 1420)
- John Castell (1420)
- William Alnwick (c. 1420 – c. 1422)
- William Hayton (?–1432)
  - James Lunayn (1434–1443) (King's Secretary to the Kingdom of France)
  - Jean de Rinel (1434–1442) (King's Secretary in his Realm of France)
- Thomas Beckington (1439–1443)
  - Gervais de Vulre (1442–1451)
  - Michael de Parys
- Thomas Mannyng (1460–1464)
  - Gylet de Ferrers
- William Hatteclyffe (c. 1464 – 1480)
- Oliver King (1480–1483)
- John Kendal (1483–1485)
- Richard Foxe (1485–1487)
- Oliver King (1487–1492) (probably)
- Thomas Routhall (1500–1516)
- Richard Pace (1516–1526)
- William Knight (1526 – August 1529)
- Stephen Gardiner (5 August 1529 – April 1534)
- Thomas Cromwell (April 1534 – April 1540)

Date	One	Two	Third
April 1540	Thomas Wriothesley; Wriothesley was the first secretary to share the office with a colleague.	Ralph Sadler	
23 April 1543 – April 1548	Thomas Wriothesley; Wriothesley was the first secretary to share the office with a colleague.	William Paget	
January 1544 – March 1557	William Petre	William Paget	
17 April 1548 – 15 October 1549	William Petre	Thomas Smith	
15 October 1549 – 5 September 1550	William Petre	Nicholas Wotton	
5 September 1550 – July 1553	William Petre	William Cecil	
June 1553 – July 1553	William Petre	William Cecil	John Cheke (served as a third Secretary of State)
July 1553 – April 1558	William Petre	John Bourne	
March 1557 – November 1558	John Boxall	John Bourne	
sole Secretary - April 1558 – November 1558	John Boxall		
November 1558 – 13 July 1572	William Cecil		
13 July 1572 – March 1576 - sole Secretary until 20 December 1573	Thomas Smith		
20 December 1573 – April 1590	Thomas Smith	Francis Walsingham	
sole Secretary - March 1576-12 November 1577	Francis Walsingham		
12 November 1577 – 16 June 1581	Francis Walsingham	Thomas Wilson	
sole Secretary - 16 June 1581-September 158)	Francis Walsingham		
September 1586 – February 1587	Francis Walsingham	William Davison	
sole Secretary - February 1587-April 1590	Francis Walsingham		
5 July 1590 – July 1596 - Acting-Secretary)	William Cecil, 1st Baron Burghley		

- Robert Cecil (July 1596 – 24 May 1612)

=== Stuart ===
- John Herbert (10 May 1600 – 9 July 1617)

- Robert Carr, Lord Rochester (May 1612 – March 1614)
- Ralph Winwood (29 March 1614 – 27 October 1617)
  - Thomas Lake (3 January 1616 – 16 February 1619)
- Robert Naunton (8 January 1618 – 14 January 1623)
  - George Calvert (16 February 1619 – January 1625)
- Edward Conway (14 January 1623 – 14 December 1628)
- Albertus Morton (9 February 1625 – 6 September 1625)
  - John Coke (9 September 1625 – 3 February 1640)
- Dudley Carleton, 1st Viscount Dorchester (14 December 1628 – 15 February 1632)
- Francis Windebank (15 June 1632 – December 1640)
  - Henry Vane (3 February 1640 – December 1641)
- Edward Nicholas (27 November 1641 – 1646 when he left England; he was reappointed by King Charles II September 1654 – 2 October 1662)
  - Lucius Cary, 2nd Viscount Falkland (8 January 1642 – 20 September 1643)
  - George Digby, 2nd Earl of Bristol (28 September 1643 – 1645)

=== Commonwealth and Protectorate ===
- Thomas Scot (July 1649 – April 1652)
- John Thurloe (April 1652 – May 1660)

For the subsequent period see:

- Secretary of State for the Northern Department
- Secretary of State for the Southern Department
