= Rous Lench, Worcestershire =

Village in Worcestershire, England

Rous Lench
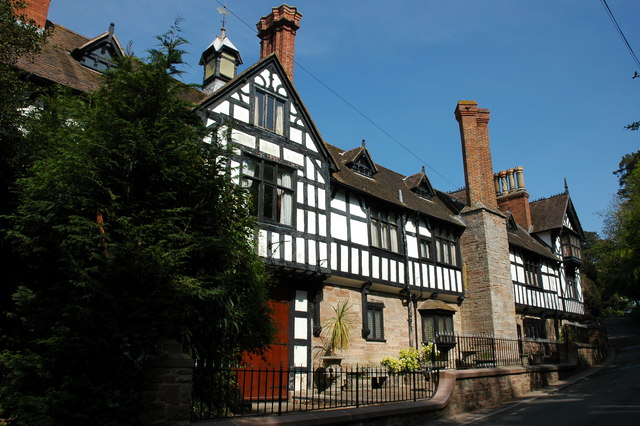
- Rous Lench Court

- Location within Worcestershire
- OS grid reference: SP01315330
- Civil parish: Rous Lench
- District: Wychavon
- Shire county: Worcestershire
- Region: West Midlands
- Country: England
- Sovereign state: United Kingdom
- Post town: EVESHAM
- Postcode district: WR11
- Police: West Mercia
- Fire: Hereford and Worcester
- Ambulance: West Midlands
- UK Parliament: Redditch

Rous Lench is a village and civil parish in Wychavon, Worcestershire, England.

The name Lench derives from the Old English hlenc meaning 'extensive hill slope'. The affix Rous derives from the Rous family who held the village by the 14th century.

Rous Lench Court, a 16th-century timber-framed building formerly the seat of the Rouse baronets, is a Grade II* listed building.

St Peter's Church, Rous Lench is Grade I listed. Dating from the 12th century, the Norman church was enlarged and partly rebuilt by Frederick Preedy between 1884 and 1896.

Rous Lench Village Hall, built in 1885 and deeded to the village in 1947, hosts public events and is available for hire.
