= Peter Atwood =

English Dominican friar (1643–1712)

Peter Atwood (1643–1712) was an English Dominican friar.

Atwood was a native of Warwickshire, joined the order in 1678, and was ordained priest five years later. He was several times cast into prison, and at length was condemned to death on account of his sacerdotal character. The hurdle was actually at the gate of the gaol to convey him to Tyburn when Charles II sent him a reprieve. Father Atwood, who governed his brethren as provincial from 1698 to 1706, died in London, 12 August 1712.
