= Gilbert Lyttelton =

16th-century English politician and knight

Gilbert Lyttelton MP
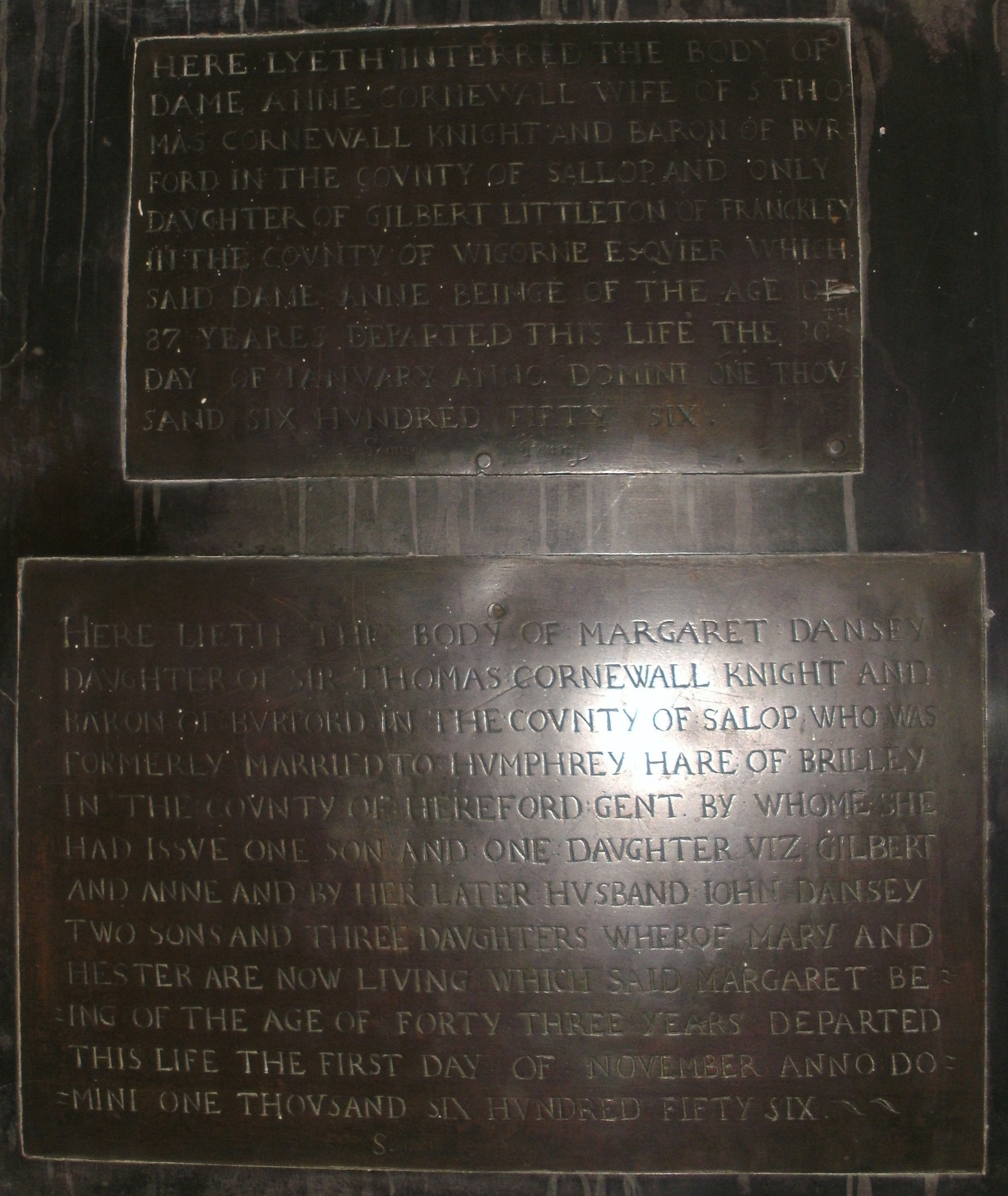
- St John the Baptist Church, Hagley, monument to Anne, only daughter of Sir Gilbert Lyttelton, and her daughter
- Born: c. 1540
- Died: 1 June 1599
- Occupations: Politician and Knight
- Title: Sir
- Spouse: Elizabeth Coningsby
- Children: 4, including John Lyttelton MP and Humphrey Littleton
- Parent(s): Sir John Lyttelton (died 1590); Bridget Pakington

Gilbert Lyttelton MP (c. 1540 – 1 June 1599) was an English politician and landowner from the Lyttelton family.

He was the eldest son of Sir John Lyttelton (died 1590). He was Member of Parliament for Worcestershire in 1570 and in 1571. He inherited the family estates in Frankley, Halesowen, Hagley, and Upper Arley on his father's death. He was appointed High Sheriff of Worcestershire for 1584.

He served as Chief Steward of the manors of the Bishop of Worcester from about 1579 to about 1588.

He died on 1 June 1599.

== Marriage and family ==
He married Elizabeth, a daughter of Humphrey Coningsby of Hampton Court, Herefordshire and sister of Thomas Coningsby. They had 3 sons and a daughter:

- John Lyttelton MP was his eldest son.
- Humphrey was executed for his part in the Gunpowder Plot.
- Anne Lyttelton, who married Thomas Cornwall of Burford.
