= Thomas Lygon =

American colonist (1623–1675)

Colonel Thomas Lygon III (also spelled Ligon, Liggon and Liggin; 11 January 1623 – 16 March 1675) was a Colonial Virginian statesman, militia officer, and landowner. Born into a genteel family in England, Lygon emigrated to the Virginia Colony in the early 1640s. He served in the House of Burgesses, representing Henrico County, and was a justice of the peace for Charles City County. Lygon owned large parcels of land along the Appomattox River, and worked as a surveyor until his death in 1675. He was the patriarch of the American branch of the Lygon family.

== Early life and family ==
Coat of arms of the Lygon family

Lygon was born in Warwickshire, England on 11 January 1623 to Sir Thomas Framer Lygon II of Madresfield Court and Elizabeth Pratt. He was baptized in the Church of England in Walsgrave on Sowe. Lygon was a member of an aristocratic family that were part of the landed gentry. He was a cousin of Sir William Berkeley and John Berkeley, 1st Baron Berkeley of Stratton. The home of Lygon's grandparents, Thomas Lygon of Elkstone and Frances Dennis, was searched by priest hunters in 1581 and, in 1592, his grandmother was fined as a recusant for refusing to attend Anglican services. He was a great-great-grandson of Sir William Denys, who served as High Sheriff of Gloucestershire and as Esquire of the Body to Henry VIII, and Anne de Berkeley of Berkeley Castle.

== Life in the colonies ==
Following his cousin, Sir William Berkeley, who was appointed by Charles I as the Royal Governor of Virginia, Lygon emigrated to the Virginia Colony in the early 1640s, at the age of sixteen, arriving in Jamestown in 1641. On 18 April 1644, while Lygon was living at the home of John and Sarah Woodson, their settlement was attacked by Native Americans. During the battle, Lygon shot and killed seven people. The gun he used is now owned by the Virginia Historical Society.

Lygon patented several large parcels of land north of the Appomattox River in The Cowpens, then part of Henrico County. In 1668, three hundred acres of land on the south side of the James River were granted to Lygon and Major William Farrar. On 7 April 1671, Lygon was granted 387 acres of land on the north side of the Appomattox. On 20 September 1672, he was granted 1,468 acres along the James River.

He married Mary Harris, daughter of the planter Captain Thomas Harris, and had at least five children with her.

Lygon was active in government in the colony, and was appointed to represent his cousin on various occasions. He served in the House of Burgesses, representing Henrico County, and was a member of the Committee for Private Causes. His brother-in-law, Major William Harris, held the other Henrico County seat. Lygon was active in the county militia, serving as a lieutenant colonel and later as a colonel. On 1 August 1657, he was appointed as a justice of the peace for Charles City County, Virginia. He worked as a surveyor until his death in 1675.

He died in Henrico County on 16 March 1675.
