= Littleton Township =

Littleton Township may refer to:

- Littleton Township, Schuyler County, Illinois
- Littleton Township, Halifax County, North Carolina, in Halifax County, North Carolina
