= Walter Blount (died 1561) =

English politician

Walter Blount (by 1506 – 1561) was an English politician.

He was a member (MP) of the parliament of England for Worcestershire in March 1553 and November 1554.
