= John Beauchamp (MP for Worcestershire) =

English politician (1377–1420)

Sir John Beauchamp (6 January 1377 – 27 August 1420) was an English politician. He sat as MP for Worcestershire in 1401, October 1404 and April 1414.

From 1398 till 1399, he served as 2nd Baron Beauchamp of Kidderminster but was forced to give up his title upon the deposition of Richard II. He was knighted c. 1399.

== Political career ==
He also served as tax collector for Worcestershire in March 1404; justice of the peace of Worcestershire from 8 May 1404 till his death; commissioner of oyer and terminer in Worcestershire in July 1406 and December 1409; commissioner of arrest in February 1412; commissioner of inquiry concerning Lollards in January 1414; commissioner of gaol delivery in Worcester in July 1416.

He also served as escheator of Worcestershire from 9 November 1406 till 2 November 1407 and 10 November 1413 till 14 December 1415; Deputy Sheriff of Worcestershire by appointment of Richard, Earl of Warwick) from 20 December 1406 till 10 November 1408 and 11 December 1411 till 2 November 1412.

== Family ==
He was the son and heir of Sir John Beauchamp, 1st Baron Beauchamp of Kidderminster by Joan, the daughter and heiress of Robert Fitzwith. c. 1397, he married Isabel, the daughter of Henry, Lord Ferrers (died 1388) by Joan, who was probably the daughter of Sir Thomas Hoo and they had one daughter. c. 1410, he married Alice (died before 1428).
