= Littleton (name) =

Littleton is both a surname and a masculine given name. Notable people with the name include:

Surname:

- Littleton baronets, numerous English jurists and politicians
- Ananias Charles Littleton (1886–1974), American accounting scholar
- Benjamin Horsley Littleton (1889–1966), American judge
- C. Scott Littleton (1933–2010), American anthropologist and academic
- Carol Littleton (born 1942), American film editor
- Col. Littleton (born 1943), American fashion designer
- Edward Littleton, 1st Baron Hatherton (1791–1863), British politician
- Edward Littleton, 2nd Baron Hatherton (1815–1888), British politician
- Edward Littleton (colonial administrator) (died 1705), English businessman
- Graceson Littleton (born 2006), American football player
- Harvey Littleton (1922–2013), American educator and glass artist
- Herbert A. Littleton (1930–1951), United States Marine
- Humphrey Littleton (died 1606), English Gunpowder Plotter
- Jody Littleton (born 1974), American football player
- Larry Littleton (born 1954), American baseball player
- Martin W. Littleton (1872–1934), American politician
- Michael Flannan Littleton (1938–2002), Irish chess master
- Peggy Littleton, American politician
- Timothy Littleton (died 1679), English judge
- Wes Littleton (born 1982), American baseball player

Fictional characters:

- Claire Littleton, character in the television series Lost

Given name:

- Littleton Dennis Jr. (1765–1833), associate justice of the Maryland Court of Appeals
- Littleton Purnell Dennis (1786–1834), American politician
- Littleton Fowler, American baseball player
- Littleton Fowler, American Methodist minister
- Littleton Groom (1867–1936), Australian politician
- Littleton Kirkpatrick (1797–1859), American politician
- Littleton W. Moore (1835–1911), American politician
- Littleton Powys (died 1732), English judge
- Littleton Waller (1856–1926), United States Marine Corps general
- Littleton Waller Tazewell (1774–1860), American politician
- Littleton Waller Tazewell Bradford (1848–1918), American politician
