= John Kendal =

John Kendal (sometimes John Kendall) (c. 1400 – 1485) was secretary to Richard III of England. A devout adherent of the Yorkist affinity, and personal friend of Richard of Gloucester. He was killed in the Battle of Bosworth in 1485 whilst fighting in the King's army.

Although little is known of his immediate family, he is possibly a direct descendant of the famous Westmorland grammarian Richard Kendal (sometimes Richard de Kendall or Richard de Kendal). He is believed to be born in Appleby-in-Westmorland, England. Modern research suggests that he may have been the son of John Kendall of Gloucester. Another theory concentrates on a possible link to Jean de Foix, Earl of Kendal (a descendant of Bordeaux ally of Edward III, Gaston de Foix), through a manorial fee at Stonor, through the tenant-in-chief, a Gascon descendant of Jean de Grailly, Captal de Buch.

In 1481 whilst campaigning on the Scots Borders, Kendall transacted some land on the Manor of Wynsnowe for Richard of Gloucester to his friend and fellow soldier, Sir John Howard. Under Richard III's reign, Kendal acquired his own land in York, and became the first to receive the Honorary Freedom of the city of York, essentially, the title of a 'Freeman'.

Kendal was a strong supporter of the Yorkist affinity. Edward IV appointed him Cofferer to the Household and later Clerk of Works, where he was a reliable civil servant to the palatial royal household. During 1483 he obtained offices from April onwards on the death of the old king. The Comptroller of the Exchange, Assayer of the Mint were all his from an affinity for the Liveried Guilds. But later that year he was re-appointed Chief Clerk and Keeper of the Rolls of the King's Bench, so that by the time of Richard III's coup d'état he became Secretary. On 1 August the Lord Chancellor of England's Great Seal was sent to the Master of Rolls for safe-keeping, by which time Kendal was known to be senior to the Clerks. Kendal was a prime mover in Richard's regime, a longtime close associate as secretary to the duke of Gloucester. Kendal surmised the role of Secretary rendering it politically as important as it ever had been.

Kendal died at the Battle of Bosworth

== See also ==
- Secretary of State (England)
- Cofferer of the Household
- Freeman of the City of York
- Clerk of the Works
- Assayer of the Mint
- Comptroller of the Exchange

Political offices
Preceded by Oliver King	Secretary of State (England)	Succeeded by Richard Foxe
Unknown	Clerk of the Works unknown	Unknown
Preceded by	Freeman of York	Succeeded by
