= John Atte Wode =

14th-century English politician

John Atte Wode was elected MP for Worcestershire in November 1372, November 1373, April 1376, January 1380 and November 1380.

The family held land at Trimpley, Wolverley and Wood Acton, all in Worcestershire.
