= Sir John Lyttelton (1519–1590) =

English nobleman, politician, knight and landowner

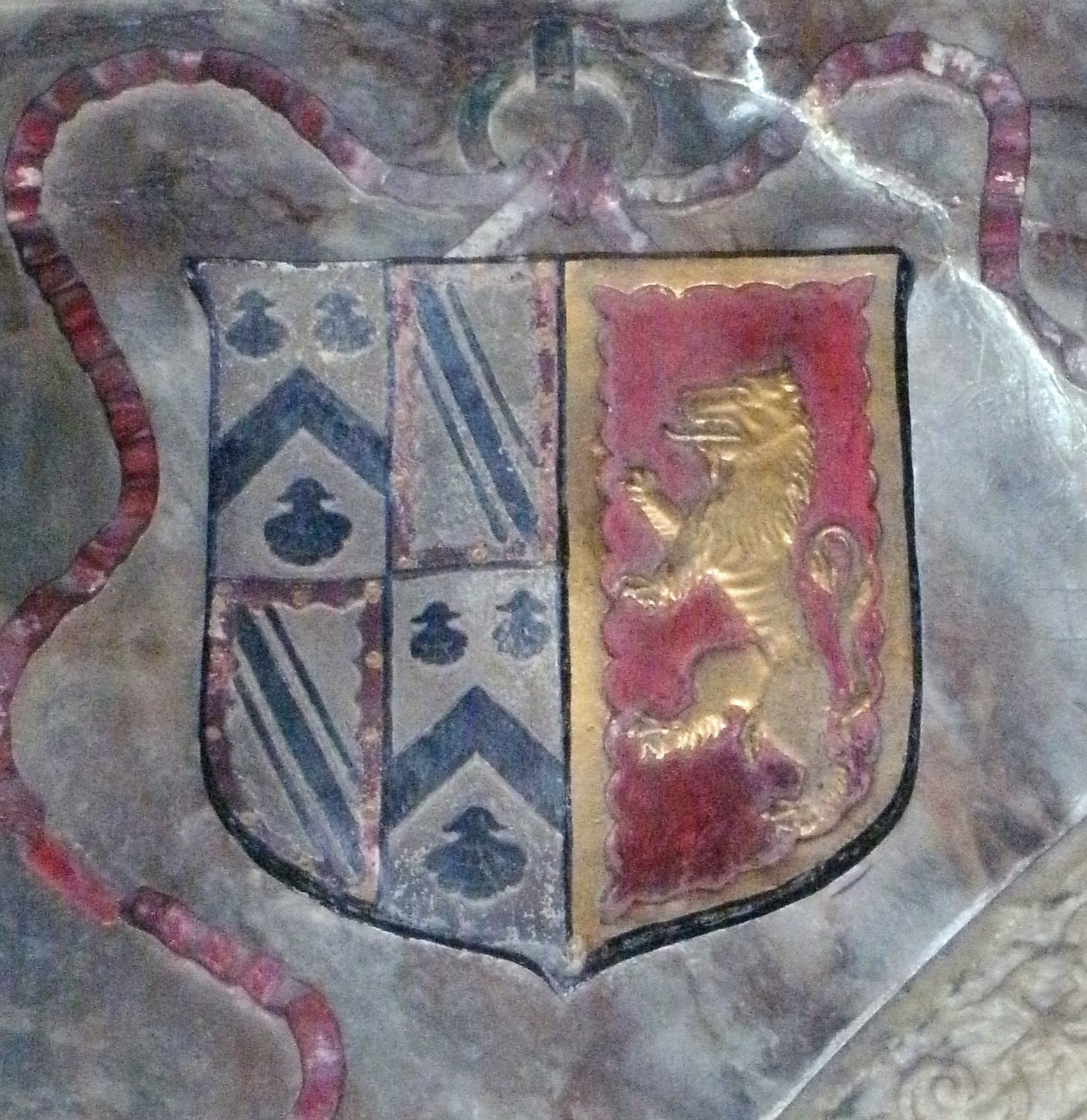
- The arms of Sir John Lyttelton's parents, combining Lyttelton and Talbot
- Born: 28 October 1519
- Died: 15 February 1590 (aged 70)
- Occupations: Politician and Knight
- Title: Sir
- Spouse: Bridget Pakington
- Children: Elizabeth Littleton, Sir Gilbert Lyttelton
- Parent(s): Sir John Littleton; Elizabeth Talbot
- Relatives: Sir William Littelton (grandfather)

Sir John Lyttelton (28 October 1519 – 15 February 1590) was an English nobleman, politician, knight, and landowner from the Lyttelton family during the Tudor period.

== Biography ==
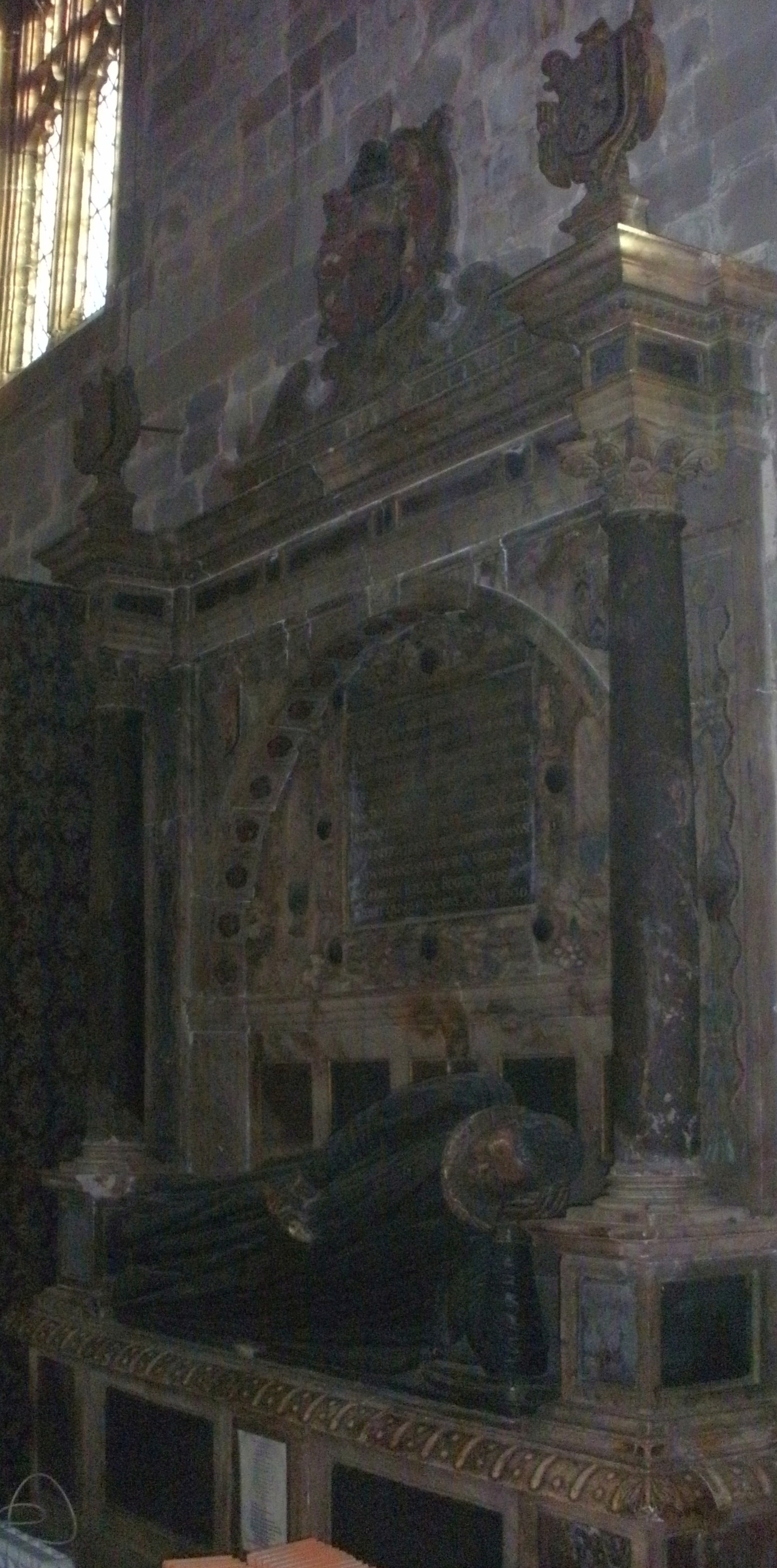
St John the Baptist Church, Bromsgrove, monument to George Lyttelton, the brother of Sir John Lyttelton (1520–1590).

John Lyttelton was the son of Sir John Littleton (c. 1500–1533), son of Sir William Littleton (1450–1507), knighted after the Battle of Stoke, and his second wife, Mary Whittington, in turn the eldest son and heir of Sir Thomas de Littleton (d. 1481), justice and author of Littleton's Tenures. His mother was Elizabeth (née Talbot, d. 1581), daughter and coheiress of Sir Gilbert Talbot of Grafton, Worcestershire (died 1542). John Lyttelton's brother, George (1528–1600), became a prominent lawyer; there is a monument to him in St John the Baptist Church, Bromsgrove.

John Lyttelton was of age in 1541. He was made Constable of Dudley Castle and keeper of the old and new parks there in 1553. He was knighted by Elizabeth I at Kenilworth in 1566. He was a Member of the Council of Wales and the Marches, a Deputy Lieutenant and a Justice of the Peace for Worcestershire.

He purchased the manor of Halesowen (formerly of Halesowen Abbey) from Lord Robert Dudley (later Earl of Leicester) in 1558. He bought the manor of Hagley from John St. Leger in 1565. These together with Frankley and Upper Arley (which he inherited) were the core of the family estate. Save that Upper Arley devolved away from the male line, this has remained in the hands of the family ever since, though parts were sold off in the 20th century.

== Family and descendants ==
He married Bridget Pakington (b. 1522), the daughter of Sir John Pakington. Their children included:

- Elizabeth Lyttleton (1546 – 4 June 1594), who in 1564 married Sir Francis Willoughby (d. 16 November 1596) of Wollaton Hall, Nottinghamshire.
- His heir, Gilbert (c. 1570–1599), who was the father of John († 1601) and Humphrey († 1606)
- Margaret Lyttleton, who in 1561 married Samuel Marrow of Berkswell (died 1610). Their daughter Bridget Marrow was a keeper of the jewels of Anne of Denmark.
- Amphylis Lyttleton, who married William Barnaby of Brockhampton

== Notes ==
Honorary titles
| Preceded by Sir Thomas Russell | Custos Rotulorum of Worcestershire before 1577 – 1590 | Succeeded by Sir John Pakington |
