= John Lyttelton (MP) =

16th-century English politician

John Lyttelton MP JP
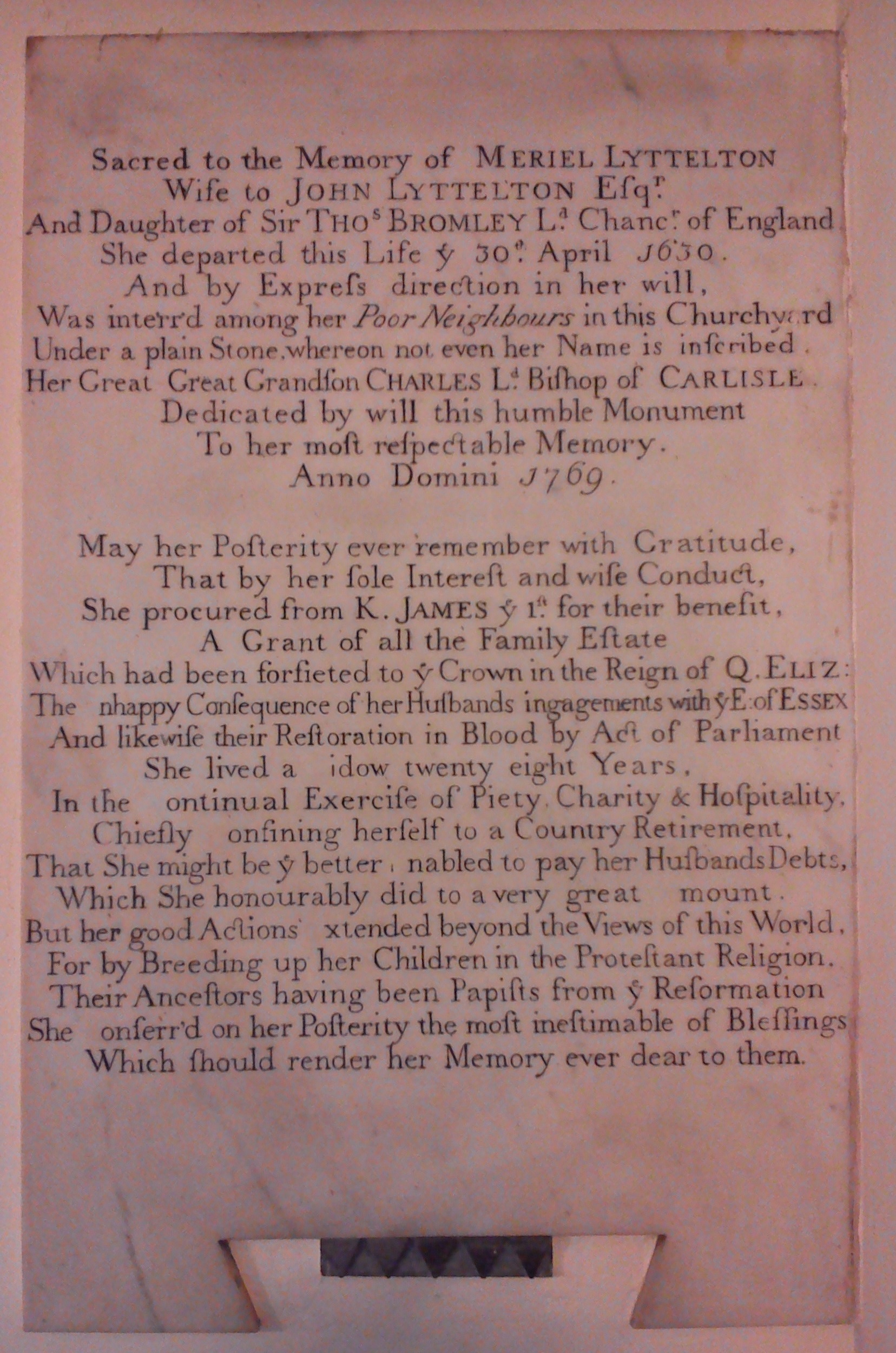
- St John the Baptist Church, Hagley, monument to Meriel Bromley, the wife of Sir John Lyttelton, with a remarkable anti-Catholic inscription
- Born: 1561
- Died: 1601 (aged 39–40)
- Occupations: Politician and Knight
- Title: Sir
- Spouse: Meriel Bromley
- Children: 11, including Sir Thomas Lyttelton, 1st Baronet
- Parent(s): Sir Gilbert Lyttelton; Elizabeth Coningsby

John Lyttelton (1561–1601) was an English politician and member of the Lyttelton family who served as Member of Parliament for Worcestershire during the reign of Queen Elizabeth I.

== Career ==
He was the eldest son of Sir Gilbert Lyttelton. He entered Magdalen College, Oxford in 1576 and studied law at the Inner Temple. He married Meriel, daughter of Sir Thomas Bromley, Lord Chancellor of England. They had three sons and eight daughters.

He was elected to Parliament as knight of the shire for Worcestershire in 1584, 1586 and 1597. He was also JP for the country from about 1583 and was its custos rotulorum by 1601.

He was involved in the Rebellion of Robert Devereux, 2nd Earl of Essex in 1601 and was subsequently tried for high treason, but died in the Queen's Bench prison in July 1601, having been reprieved from execution. In consequence, his estates (in Frankley, Halesowen, Hagley and Upper Arley) were forfeited to the Crown, but were restored to his widow, Meriel, on the accession of James I. She survived him (by 28 years) and cleared the estates of debt, bringing up her children as Anglicans.

Sir John was buried at St. George the Martyr, Southwark.

== Family ==
The children of John and Meriel Lyttleton included:

- Sir Thomas Lyttelton, 1st Baronet.
- Bridget Lyttelton, who married Robert Tracy, 2nd Viscount Tracy (died 1662)
