= Richard Salwey =

English politician

Richard Salwey (1615 – 1685?) was an English politician who sat in the House of Commons variously between 1645 and 1659. He was a republican in politics and fought on the Parliamentary side in the English Civil War.

== Life ==
Richard Salwey was the son of Humphrey Salwey of Stanford Court at Stanford-on-Teme, Worcestershire and his wife, Anne Littleton, daughter of Sir Edward Littleton and Mary Fisher of Pillaton Hall, Staffordshire. His father was a lawyer and MP for Worcestershire. Salwey became a grocer and merchant in London.

Salwey's father was active in the parliamentary cause, and Salwey became a major in the Parliamentarian army. In 1645, he was elected Member of Parliament for Appleby. He made his name in parliamentary affairs as member of the commissions on Irish matters.

In 1647, he travelled with Sir Thomas Wharton, Sir Robert King, Sir John Clotworthy, and Sir Robert Meredith to negotiate with the Duke of Ormond. He was a commissioner for the Tender of Union in 1651.

The beginning of the First Anglo-Dutch War saw a shake-up of the naval organisation, after defeat at the Battle of Dungeness, and with Henry Vane and George Thomson, Salwey and his ally John Carew made up the group of four effectively overseeing the Navy for Parliament.

Salwey was a supporter of Oliver Cromwell, but broke with him at the end of the Rump Parliament, together with Francis Allen. He was a member of Barebone's Parliament, nominated for Worcestershire. He clashed with Cromwell in April 1653; and he lost his Navy position at the end of the year in a general Admiralty change. He was appointed to the new Council of State formed after the Rump was dissolved, but boycotted its meetings.

Salwey was one of a number of radical puritans who had a house in Clapham, Surrey during the late 1640s and early 1650s. He also returned to Clapham in 1683 for the last two years of his life. He was out of the country as English ambassador in Constantinople, appointed by the Lord Protector on 14 August 1654. He begged to excused the duty on 8 February 1655, and never left England.

In 1659, Salwey was active again in parliament as a member of the restored Rump parliament. He became a member of committee of the Committee of Safety and Council of State, in May of that year, and a commissioner for the Navy. The Committee sent him with Sir Henry Vane as heads of a delegation to John Lawson, a refractory republican Vice-Admiral, without success.

On 16 January 1660, he with William Sydenham was expelled from Parliament; he was sent to the Tower of London.

After the Restoration he was suspected of complicity in the Farnley Wood Plot, in 1663–64.

Salwey married, in 1641, to Anne Waring, the daughter of Richard Waring, grocer and a London alderman involved in the Levant Company. He had the resources to build a country house at Haye Park in Shropshire, and his residence is often given as the neighbouring Richard’s Castle, over the county boundary in Herefordshire; his son of the same name then built nearby at Moor Park.
