= Nicholas Lechmere (politician, died 1701) =

English politician (1613–1701)

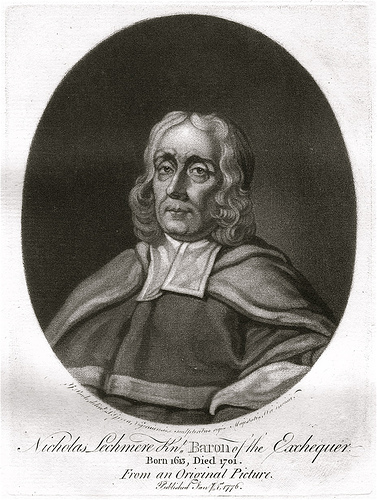
Sir Nicholas Lechmere

Sir Nicholas Lechmere (1613–1701), of Hanley Castle in Worcestershire, was an English judge and Member of Parliament.

== Life ==
A nephew of Sir Thomas Overbury, Lechmere was educated at Wadham College, Oxford, and called to the bar as a member of Middle Temple in 1641. On the outbreak of the Civil War, he sided with Parliament, and in 1648 was elected MP for Bewdley. He was present at the Battle of Worcester in 1651. After the expulsion of the Long Parliament he represented Worcestershire in all three elected parliaments of the Protectorate, and resumed his seat for Bewdley in the brief resurrection of the Rump.

After the Restoration of Charles II, Lechmere did not return to Parliament, but continued his legal career. He had already served as Attorney General to the Duchy of Lancaster from 1654, and had become a bencher of his inn in 1655. He became a Reader of the Middle Temple in 1669. In 1689, he was made a serjeant-at-law, knighted and raised to the bench as a Baron of the Exchequer, in which role he continued until 1700. He died at Hanley Castle on 30 April 1701.

== Family ==
In 1642, he married Penelope Sandys, daughter of Sir Edwin Sandys, of Northbourne, Kent, by his fourth wife, Catherine, fourth daughter of Sir Richard Bulkeley of Beaumaris, father of Thomas, viscount Bulkeley of Cashel. By her he had two sons, Edmund and Sandys. His grandson, Nicholas, also a lawyer, served as both Solicitor-General and Attorney General, and was raised to the peerage as Baron Lechmere in 1721.
