= Shire Hall, Worcester =

County building in Worcester, Worcestershire, England

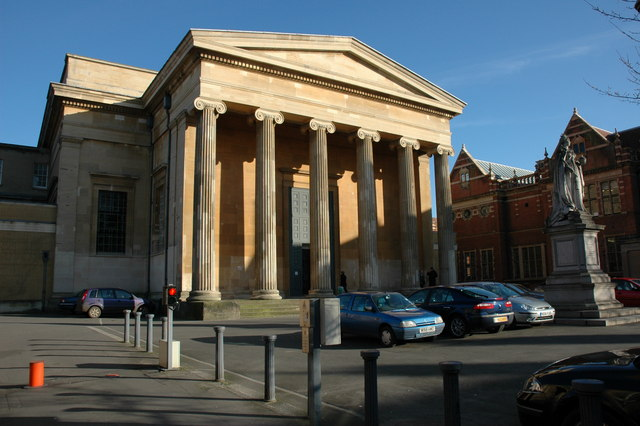
- The Shire Hall in 2007

- Location within Worcestershire
- 52.1968°N 2.2219°W
- Location: Worcester, Worcestershire

History
- Built: 1835

Site notes
- Architect(s): Charles Day and Henry Rowe
- Architectural style: Greek Revival style

Listed Building – Grade II*
- Designated: 22 May 1954
- Reference no.: 1389831

The Shire Hall is a municipal building in Foregate Street in Worcester, England. It is a Grade II* listed building.

== History ==
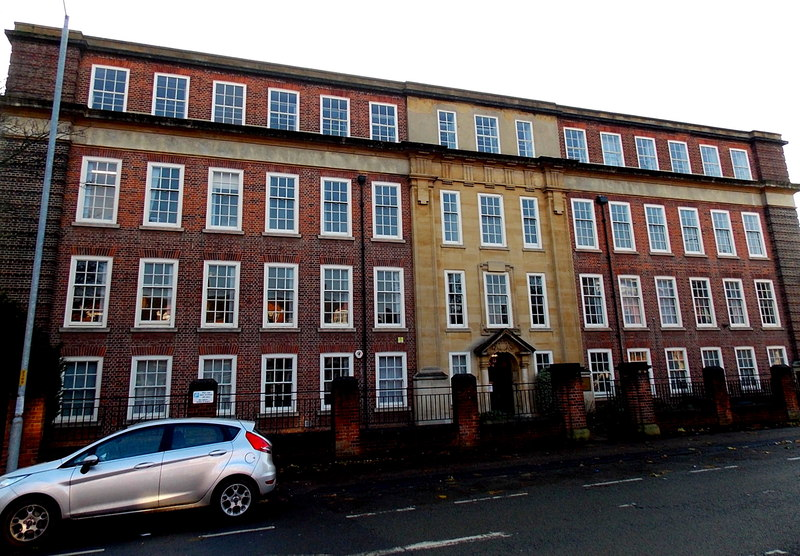
County Buildings, St Mary's Street: County Council's adjoining main offices, completed 1930.

Worcester County Hall and Courts of Justice Act 1831
- Act of Parliament
- Parliament of the United Kingdom
- Long title: An Act for erecting a County Hall and Courts of Justice, and also for providing Accommodation for His Majesty's Justices of Assize, in and for the County of Worcester.
- Citation: 1 & 2 Will. 4. c. xlviii
- Territorial extent: United Kingdom

Dates
- Royal assent: 23 August 1831
- Commencement: 23 August 1831 (Note: The Acts of Parliament (Commencement) Act 1793.)
- Repealed: 19 November 1998

Other legislation
- Repealed by: Statute Law (Repeals) Act 1998

Status: Repealed

Text of statute as originally enacted

The Worcester County Hall and Courts of Justice Act 1831 (1 & 2 Will. 4. c. xlviii) allowed for "erecting a County Hall and Courts of Justice, and also for providing Accommodation for His Majesty's Justices of Assize, in and for the County of Worcester." The Shire Hall, which was designed by Charles Day and Henry Rowe in the Greek Revival style, was completed in 1835. The design involved a symmetrical main frontage facing onto Foregate Street; the central section featured a hexastyle portico with Ionic order columns supporting a pediment. The principal rooms included a Grand Hall and the courtrooms. Pevsner applauded the "impeccable Grecian design" of the Shire Hall with its "excellent Schinkelish detail". A statue of Queen Victoria, designed by Sir Thomas Brock, was unveiled outside the building in 1887.

A pipe organ, designed and manufactured by Nicholson & Co, was installed in the Shire Hall in 1884. The Czech composer, Antonín Dvořák, toured the UK that year and made a visit to Worcester although no organ pieces were actually played at concerts during his visit.

Although originally used as a facility for dispensing justice, following the implementation of the Local Government Act 1888 (51 & 52 Vict. c. 41), which established county councils in every county, the Shire Hall also became the meeting place for Worcestershire County Council. The county council later also built County Buildings on land immediately north of Shire Hall, facing St Mary's Street, to house its administrative offices. County Buildings was completed in 1930 to the designs of Alfred Vernon Rowe, the county architect.

Visitors to the Shire Hall included Princess Elizabeth who entered the building on 8 June 1951 during celebrations associated with the bi-centenary of the Royal Worcester Porcelain Factory. They also included the writer, John Betjeman, who made a controversial speech in the building in 1964 in which he repeated some comments made by his colleague, James Lees-Milne, who had complained about the "vandalism of the modern world" when authoring the Shell Guide to Worcestershire.

Following the implementation of the Courts Act 1971, the former assizes court was re-designated Worcester Crown Court. After the Worcestershire County Council was abolished in 1974, the new authority, Hereford and Worcester County Council was initially based at the Shire Hall and adjoining County Buildings in Worcester but moved its base to County Hall in Worcester in 1978. The Shire Hall's activities were then restricted to that of a crown court.
