= Worcestershire Record Office =

Worcestershire Record Office is located in Worcester, England, as a part of Worcestershire County Council. The Worcestershire Record Office comprises three branches, two of which are located in County Hall, the third at The Hive, Worcester.

== History ==
Worcestershire had been among the first counties to establish a records committee in the 1890s, and a proposal to establish a county record office had been unsuccessful in 1938. Worcestershire Record Office opened with E. H. Sargeant as the first County Archivist in 1947, situated at the Shire Hall in Worcester city. In the mid-1950s additional space was added with the acquisition of the St. Helen's church (Fish Street, Worcester). In 1985 the Record Office moved to a purpose-built building located on the County Hall campus in Worcester. In 2001 the branch at St Helen's was closed, and a new History Centre was opened on Trinity Street in the city. In July 2012 the Record Office and the History Centre moved to a new purpose-built Worcester Library and History Centre, known as The Hive, Worcester.

== The Hive, Library, Archive & Archaeology Hub ==
=== Original archives ===
- Administrative archives of the present and former County and some districts.
- Petty Sessions and other official records such as those of Coroners, some hospitals and poor law unions.
- Quarter Sessions records dating back to 1590.
- The extensive Worcestershire Photographic Survey.
- Records of the Diocese of Worcester.
- Ecclesiastical and Non-conformist records.
- Estate and family papers.
- School records.
- Maps and plans.
- Records of groups, societies and businesses in Worcestershire.
- The Worcester City Archives
- Croome collection - the archive of the Earls of Coventry
- Police records

To consult original documents researchers need to be members of CARN (County Archive Research Network). A CARN ticket can be issued for a small standard fee on production of photo ID and proof of address.

=== Self-Service collections ===
These are mostly available on microfilm & microfiche for which a number of readers are provided

- Census returns.
- Local maps
- Trade and clerical directories
- Local newspapers.
- Parish and non-conformist records
- Wills and other probate records
- Cemetery and crematoria records
- International Genealogical Index
- General Register Office index of births, marriages and deaths
- The Worcestershire Photographic Survey
- Access to Ancestry.co.uk
- Access to FindMyPast.co.uk (including UK historical newspaper archive and the UK 1939 household register)

There are also various CD-ROM packages available for use and The Hive houses a countywide selection of local and family history books including trade directories and local histories. These books are for reference only.

Access to one of the 350 computers, printing and WiFi access for your own computer at The Hive is provided through a Worcestershire County Library card (obtainable on production of photo ID and proof of address).

See The Hive, Worcester for further details

== County Hall ==
=== The Corporate Information Management Unit ===
Concerned with the management of records produced by Worcestershire County Council staff it is only open for use by members of the council. The record office collects, preserves and makes available records relating to the history of Worcestershire and its residents, dating from the 12th Century to the 21st Century.

=== Birth, Marriages & Death Registrar ===
The registrar for Births Marriages and Deaths is located in County Hall. A room for marriages is provided whilst the team officiates marriage contracts as an outreach service.
