= Gjebrea =

Gjebrea is an Albanian surname. Notable people with the surname include:

- Ardit Gjebrea (born 1963), Albanian singer-songwriter, producer, and television presenter
- Elona Gjebrea (born 1968), Albanian politician
- Ramize Gjebrea (1923–1944), Albanian World War II partisan
