= Croome collection =

Coordinates: 52.186°N 2.183°W

The Croome collection – the archive of the Earls of Coventry – came into public ownership in 2005 as part of the Acceptance in Lieu of Inheritance Tax Scheme, whereby the nation accepts valuable assets to set against tax liabilities. In 2006, after making a case to the Museums, Libraries and Archives Council (MLA) for housing the collection, Worcestershire Record Office was identified as its new permanent home. A project is currently underway to catalogue the collection according to the International Standard for Archival Description (ISAD(G), making it fully accessible to the public for the first time.

The Croome Collection takes its name from Croome Court in Croome D'Abitot, Worcestershire, the seat of the Coventry family from the 1592 until 1948. It is an internationally significant archive that has been created over hundreds of years by the Coventry family and their estate. The archive includes substantial runs of papers relating to the estates of the family, including plans, rentals, deeds and correspondence. It also includes unique records relating to the building, decoration and furnishing of Croome Court and the creation and development of the parkland surrounding it, which was Lancelot "Capability" Brown's first complete landscape work.

== History ==
Prior to the transfer of the collection to Worcestershire Record Office, the collection was stored for many years at the Coventry family home of Croome Court. In 1938 part of the collection was sent to Birmingham Reference Library on permanent loan by permission of George William, 10th Earl of Coventry. Around 25,000 documents were sent to the Library, including the official papers of Sir Thomas Coventry, Lord Keeper of the Great Seal of England. Although it was the intention that the collection would be worked upon whilst there, the intervening years of World War II led to a severe staff shortage, meaning the work was stalled until after the end of the war.

In 1948 work began to catalogue the official papers of Lord Keeper Thomas Coventry. This was completed in 1950. Four boxes of deeds from the collection were also catalogued. Although attempts were made by Birmingham Reference Library to attain the other existing parts of the Croome collection, in 1950 the Trustees of the Croome Estate requested that the material be returned to the estate office. The collection was returned to the Croome Estate Trust on 28 February 1950, although Birmingham Reference Library retained the papers of Lord Keeper Coventry and the four boxes of catalogued deeds.

During the 1950s Lt. Col. O.D. Smith, D.L. J.P., Agent and Managing Trustee of the Croome Estate Trust worked on the arrangement of the archive, sorting it into 3 main sections: family papers (personal correspondence of family members, diaries, photographs, recipe books and the bills and accounts relating to the building and landscaping of the Court and park), estate management papers (rentals, accounts, estate diaries, wage books and papers relating to the running of the estate) and parish boxes (title deeds, leases, manorial documents etc.). During the 1980s work was done on the collection, storing it in archival quality boxes and creating box lists to help navigation around the collection. The collection remained in this order until its transfer to Worcestershire Record Office in November 2006.

The archive was professionally valued and upon consideration that it met the third criterion of the Acceptance in Lieu Scheme, that is to say that it is 'of especial importance for the study of some particular branch of art, learning or history', the collection was accepted to settle £436,854 of tax. An invitation was put out to tender for interested bodies that may wish to house the collection. Because the information contained within the collection is integral to Worcestershire history, Worcestershire Record Office expressed great interest in the collection and was granted permanent allocation of the collection. On 9 November 2006 the collection was transferred from the Croome estate office to Worcestershire Record Office. The collection held at Worcestershire Record Office covers the estate archive up to the year 1921, the year that the estate was placed in the hands of the Croome Estate Trust. Records created after this date remain with the Croome Estate Trust.

== The Coventry family ==
The Croome collection is the family and estate archive of the Earls of Coventry. Before they were given the title of the Earl of Coventry on 26 April 1697 the family held the title of Baron of Allesborough. The Barony died out with the death of Gilbert Coventry in 1719, as he left no male issue. The Earldom still survives today.

The key members of the Coventry family who created the archives are:

Sir Thomas Coventry (1547–1606)

Sir Thomas Coventry (1578–1640) 1st Baron Coventry of Aylesborough, Lord Keeper of the Great Seal of England

Thomas Coventry (1606–1661) 2nd Baron Coventry of Aylesborough

George Coventry (1628–1680) 3rd Baron Coventry of Aylesborough

John Coventry (1654–1685) 4th Baron Coventry of Aylesborough

Thomas Coventry (1629–1699) 1st Earl of Coventry, 5th Baron Coventry of Aylesborough

Thomas Coventry (1662–1710) 2nd Earl of Coventry, 6th Baron Coventry of Aylesborough

Thomas Coventry (1702–1712) 3rd Earl of Coventry, 7th Baron Coventry of Aylesborough

Gilbert Coventry (1668–1719) 4th Earl of Coventry, 8th Baron Coventry of Aylesborough

William Coventry (1678–1751) 5th Earl of Coventry

George William Coventry (1722–1809) 6th Earl of Coventry

George William Coventry (1758–1831) 7th Earl of Coventry

George William Coventry (1784–1843) 8th Earl of Coventry

George William Coventry (1838–1930) 9th Earl of Coventry
