= David Green (university administrator) =

Vice-Chancellor of the University of Worcester

David Mino Allen Green CBE (born August 1952) is an economist and university administrator.

Green is the son of Mino Green (1927–2022), a Jewish New York-born electronics scientist, and his wife Diana (née Allen) (- 2012). Mino's father was a jewellery and antiques dealer who served in the anti-communist White Russian army before fleeing the Bolshevik Revolution in 1917.

He studied economics at St John's College, Cambridge.

He has been Vice-Chancellor of the University of Worcester since 2003.

In 2017, he accused Tory MP Chris Heaton-Harris of McCarthyism, after Heaton-Harris wrote to him in an attempt to compile a "hit list" of university professors who teach Brexit courses. Green called it "the first step to the thought police".

In 2018, he was appointed a CBE for services to higher education, but faced criticism over his high pay, which was £319,000 at the time. He has been Deputy Lieutenant of Worcestershire since 2021.

In September 2024, he opposed a rise in university tuition fees, arguing that funding for universities needed to be overhauled as the current system was broken.

== Selected works ==
- Green, David; Petrick, Karl, eds. (2002). Banking and Financial Stability in Central Europe Integrating Transition Economies Into the European Union. Edward Elgar Publishing. ISBN 978-1-84064-512-5.
