= County Hall, Worcester =

County building in Worcester, Worcestershire, England

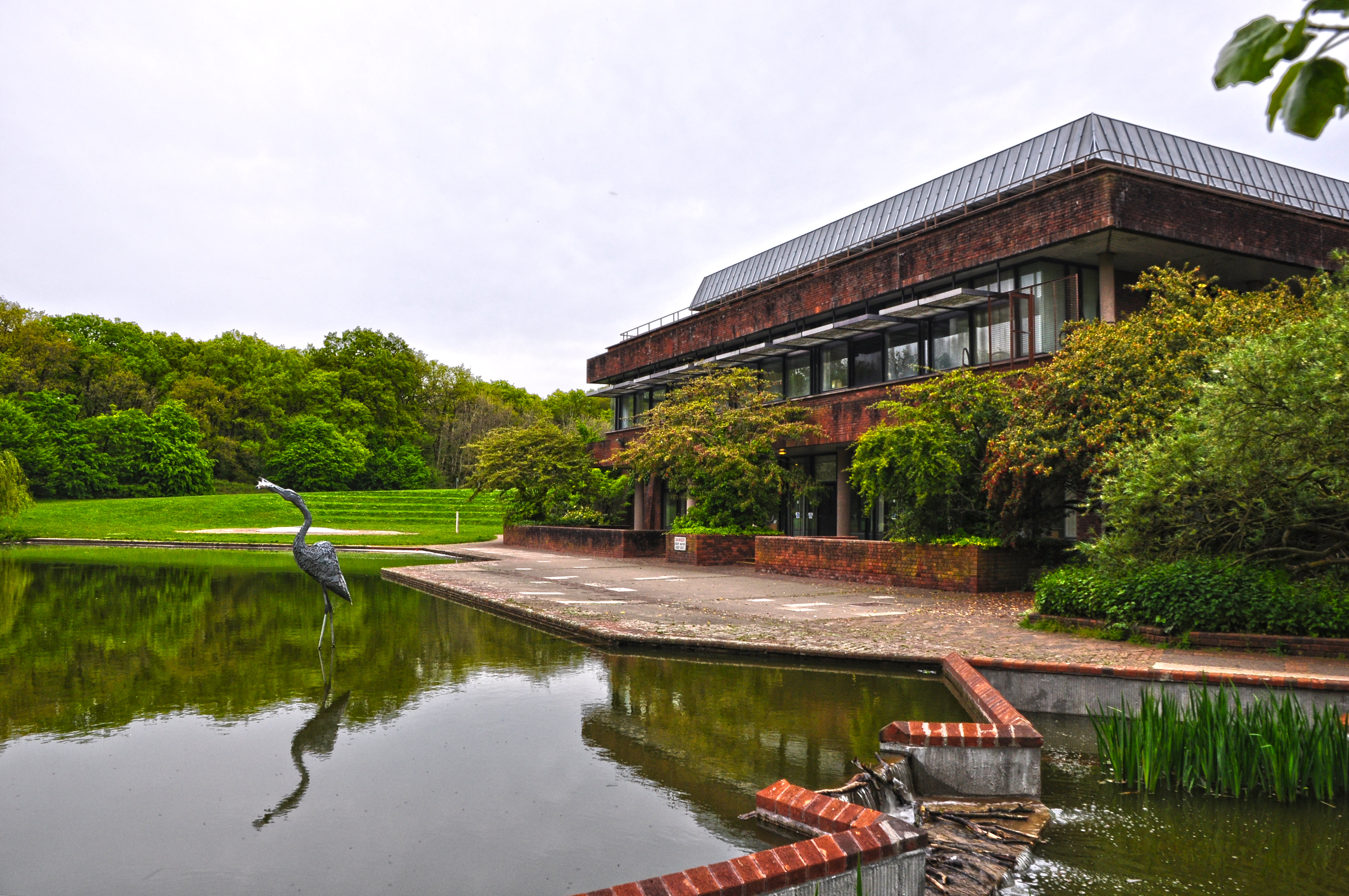
- County Hall

- Location within Worcestershire

General information
- Architectural style: Brutalist style
- Location: Spetchley Road, Worcester, United Kingdom
- Coordinates: 52.1855°N 2.1838°W
- Completed: 1978

Design and construction
- Architect: Robert Matthew Johnson-Marshall & Partners

County Hall is a municipal facility at Spetchley Road in Worcester, Worcestershire. It is the headquarters of Worcestershire County Council.

== History ==
For much of the 20th century the Shire Hall in Foregate Street was the meeting place of Worcestershire County Council. Following the amalgamation of Worcestershire County Council and Herefordshire County Council to form Hereford and Worcester County Council in 1974, the new county leaders decided to procure a purpose-built county hall: the site they selected had been open land just south of Nunnery Wood.

Construction of the new building began in 1974. It was designed by Robert Matthew Johnson-Marshall & Partners in the Brutalist style, built by the local contractor, Espley-Tyas, and was officially opened by the Duke of Edinburgh on 4 May 1978. The design for the building, which made extensive use of red brick, took the form of a series of interconnected pavilions. The central pavilion contained the public areas, meeting rooms and Riverside Café while the other pavilions accommodated the council officers, their departments and the council chamber. The landscaping included a lake, together with a waterfall, to the south west of the main building. Internally, the principal room was the council chamber: an exhibition space was subsequently established outside the council chamber at which local artists would display their work.

The County Record Office was installed in a purpose-built annex to the north east of the main building in 1985, and, following the children's television series Teenage Mutant Ninja Turtles, live terrapins were released into the lake in the 1990s.

The building became the home of Worcestershire County Council following the local boundary changes in 1998. The former TV-am weather presenter Wincey Willis visited County Hall to launch a scheme, organised by the British Trust Conservation Volunteers, to help unemployed people to return to work in March 2004, and, following the refurbishment of the council chamber, the Duke of Kent also visited County Hall and unveiled a plaque there on 19 February 2009.

Works of art at County Hall include a painting by the rural landscape artist, David Bates, depicting a herd of cows crossing the River Severn, and a sculpture by Sandy O'Connor, depicting a heron eating a fish, in the lake to the south west of the building.

The building was closed in June 2024, after councillors were told that repairs to it would cost £36 million.
