= South Worcestershire (district) =

- Future unitary authority area
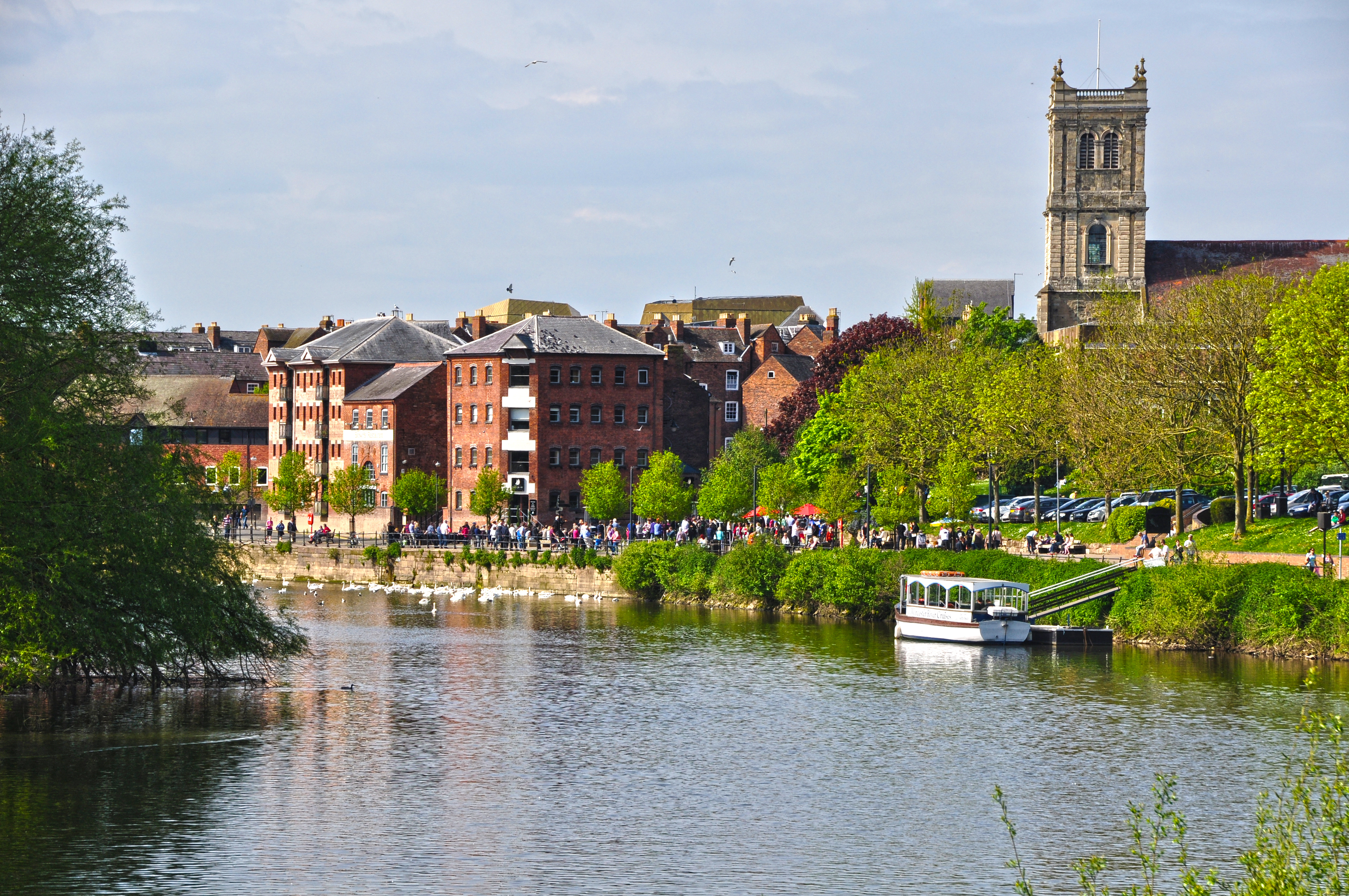
- The River Severn in Worcester

- Interactive map
- Coordinates: 52.1929°N 2.2210°W
- Sovereign state: United Kingdom
- Country: England
- Region: West Midlands
- Ceremonial county: Worcestershire

Government
  - Type: Unitary authority
  - Body: South Worcestershire Council

Area
  - Total: 491.85 sq mi (1,273.88 km^{2})

Population (2024 estimate)
  - Total: 327,915
- Time zone: UTC+0 (GMT)
  - Summer (DST): UTC+1 (BST)

South Worcestershire is expected to be a unitary authority area in the ceremonial county of Worcestershire, England. It was initially planned to be formed on 1 April 2028, with the first elections planned to take place in May 2027, however plans to create it were placed under review in September 2026 and the 2027 election was cancelled. The review concluded in October 2026, and plans to create the authority are expected to take place in 2029, with the first elections in 2028.

== Formation ==
It will be formed from the existing Worcestershire districts of Malvern Hills, Worcester and Wychavon; with the remaining, more urban, northern part of Worcestershire near to the West Midlands metropolitan county forming part of a new North Worcestershire unitary authority.

The district is being formed as part of ongoing local government changes throughout England, in which all areas of the country that have separate county councils and district councils will see those replaced with single-tier, or unitary, local governance. The alternative proposal for a single unitary, which was backed by Worcestershire County Council, but only one of the county's six district councils, was not accepted.

Decisions were announced in July 2026, with elections planned for May 2027 and the new authorities established in 2028. In September 2026, the Worcestershire proposals were halted by the government and placed under review. In October 2026, the plans were revived with the first election expected to take place in 2028 and the unitary authority established in 2029, subject to a three week consultation period. Worcestershire is one of only three areas where the proposals were not met with threat of judicial review.

== Governance ==
It will be run by South Worcestershire Council, which will comprise 60 councillors.

== Geography ==
Its largest settlement will be Worcester and it will also include Droitwich Spa, Evesham, Malvern, Pershore, Tenbury Wells and Upton-on-Severn. The area has a 2024 estimated population of 327,915.

== Parishes ==
Worcester is currently unparished, the rest of the area is parished. Worcester City Council, which would be abolished, is considering the establishment of a civil parish of Worcester, which would have a town council.
