= The Hive, Worcester =

Coordinates: 52.1938°N 2.2260°W

The Hive
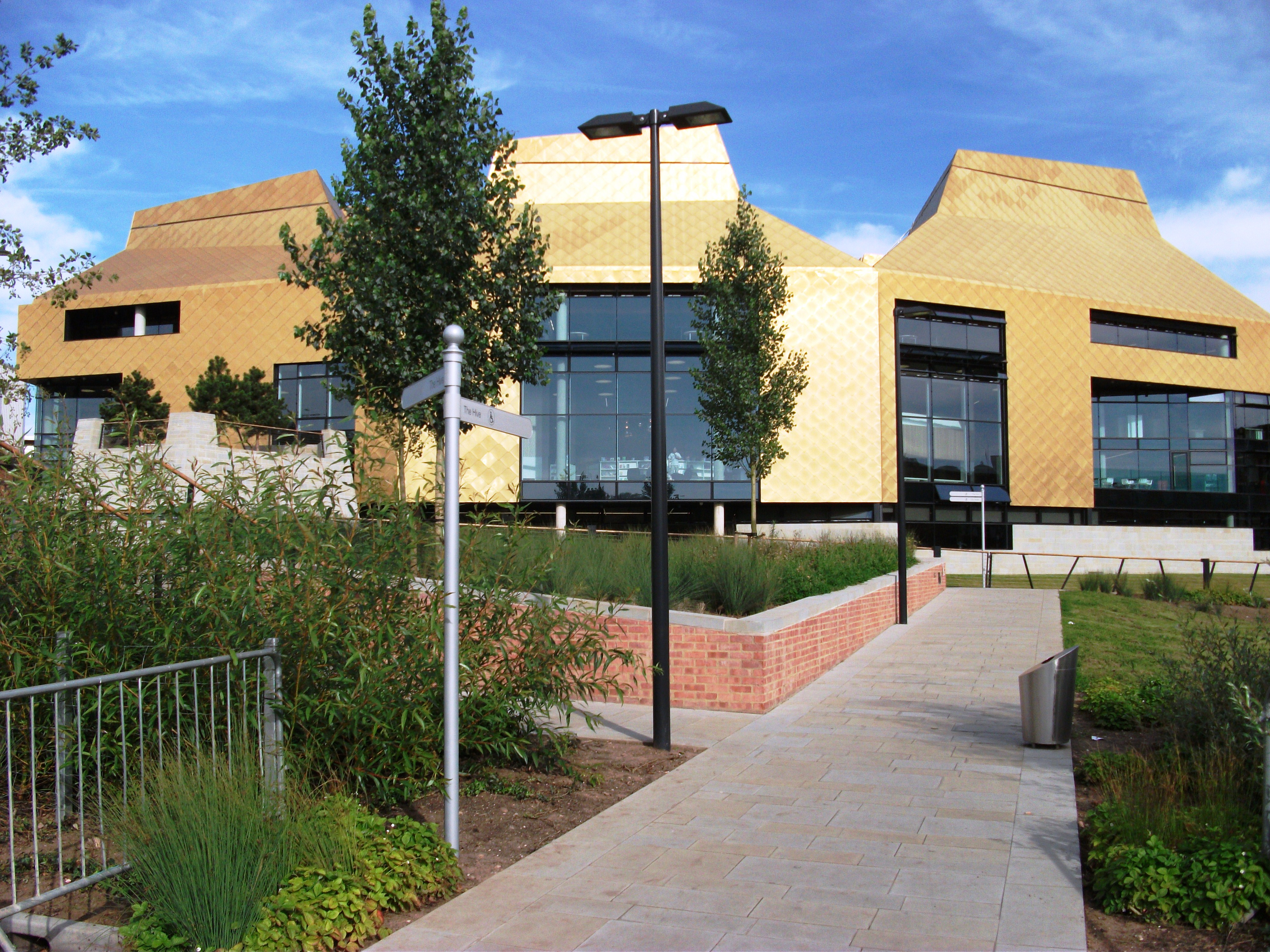
- Interactive map of the The Hive area

General information
- Type: Library
- Architectural style: Postmodern
- Location: Sawmill Walk, The Butts, Worcester, England
- Opened: 2 July 2012
- Cost: £29.7 million
- Client: Worcestershire County Council; University of Worcester

Technical details
- Floor area: 12,371m^{2}

Design and construction
- Architecture firm: Feilden Clegg Bradley Studios
- Structural engineer: Hyder Consulting; Atelier One
- Services engineer: Max Fordham
- Other designers: Copper Cladding – Norman and Underwood Ltd
- Main contractor: Galliford Try

Website
- www.thehiveworcester.org

The Hive, is a large golden-coloured building in Worcester, England, which houses the fully integrated Worcestershire County Council, City of Worcester public library, the University of Worcester's academic library, Worcestershire Record Office, the county Archive and Worcestershire Archaeology Service. The library houses over a quarter of a million books.

== History ==
The Hive was procured under a private finance initiative programme and was built by Galliford Try at a cost of £60 million. The Hive's joint commissioning clients were the University of Worcester and Worcestershire County Council. Funding was also provided by the National Lottery and the British government's Department for Culture, Media and Sport and Department for Education. It was opened to the public on 2 July 2012 and officially opened by Queen Elizabeth II on 11 July 2012.

Aerial view of The Hive and surrounding landscape

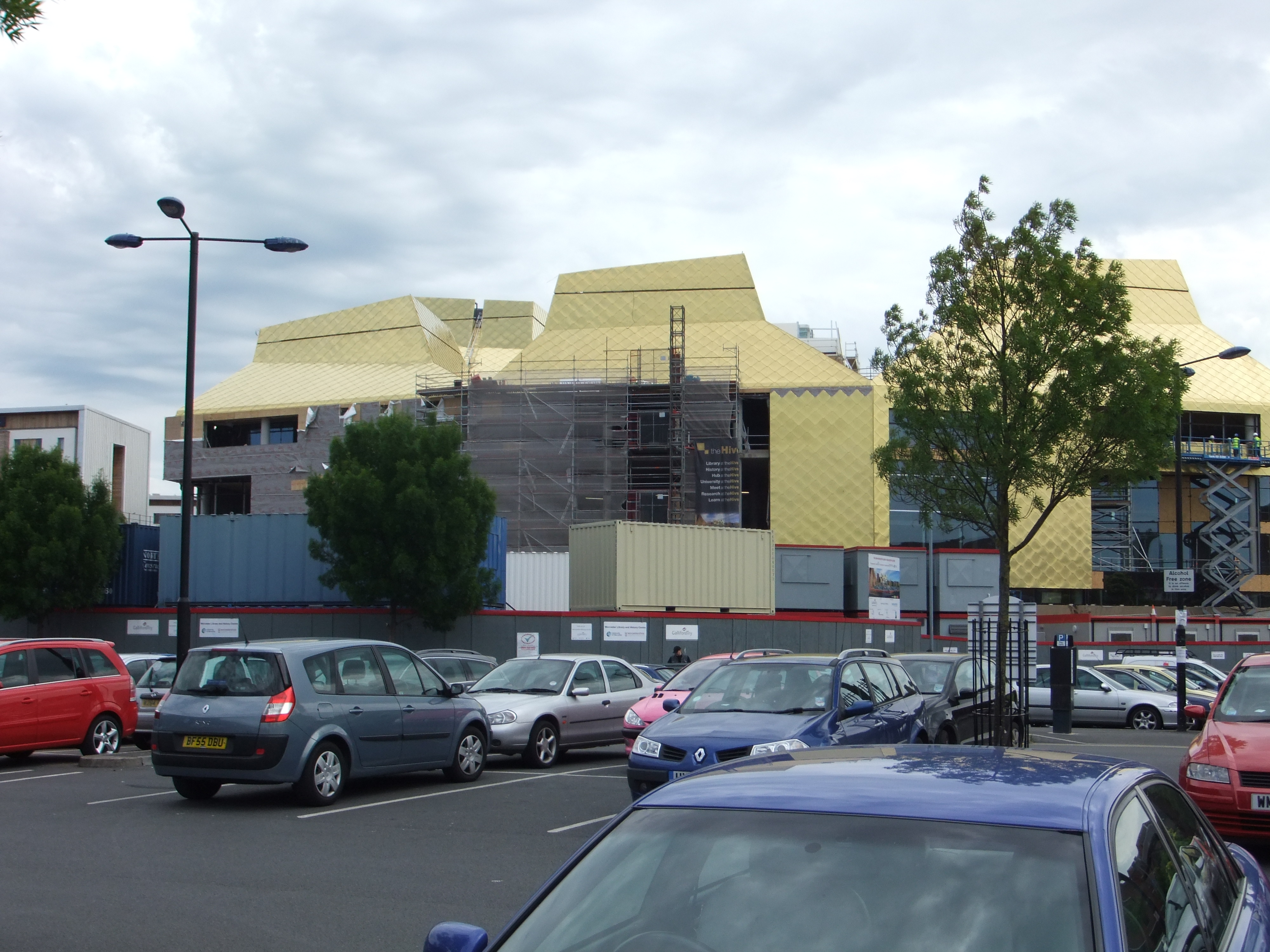
The Hive during construction in June 2011

== Awards ==
Awards include:

- Best new-build project of the year in the Chartered Institution of Building Services Engineers (CIBSE) Building Performance Awards 2013
- Sustainable Project of the Year in the Building Awards 2013
- Outstanding Library Team – Times Higher Leadership and Management Award – June 2013
- Sustainable Project of the Year – Building magazine – April 2013
- Civic Trust Award – March 2013
- Contribution to the local community through The Hive – Guardian University Award – February 2013
- New build project of the year (value above £5 million) – CIBSE – February 2013
- Building Excellence Award – South Worcestershire Building Control – 2012
- BREEAM Outstanding 86.4% – June 2012
- Best Sustainability in a Project- Public Private Partnership Awards – May 2012
