= North Worcestershire (district) =

- Future unitary authority area
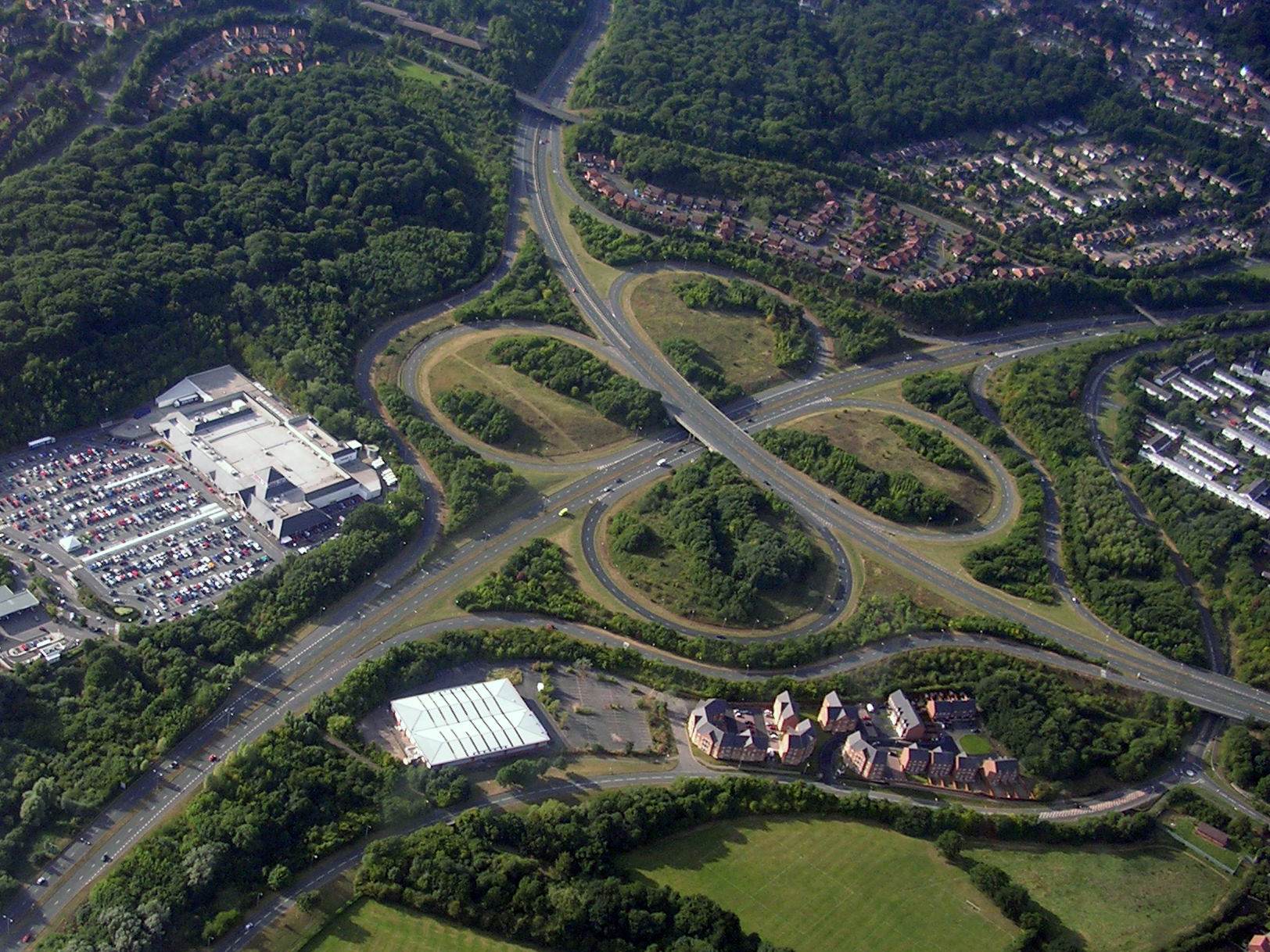
- Redditch Interchange

- Interactive map
- Coordinates: 52.3069°N 1.9415°W
- Sovereign state: United Kingdom
- Country: England
- Region: West Midlands
- Ceremonial county: Worcestershire

Government
  - Type: Unitary authority
  - Body: North Worcestershire Council

Area
  - Total: 180.17 sq mi (466.65 km^{2})

Population (2024 estimate)
  - Total: 293,445
- Time zone: UTC+0 (GMT)
  - Summer (DST): UTC+1 (BST)

North Worcestershire is expected to be a unitary authority area in the ceremonial county of Worcestershire, England. It is expected to be created in 2029, following a government review. It was initially planned to be formed on 1 April 2028, with the first elections planned to take place in May 2027, though plans to create it were placed under review in September 2026 and the first election was cancelled. Following the conclusion of the review in October 2026, the authority is expected to be created in 2029.

== Formation ==
It will be formed from the existing Worcestershire districts of Bromsgrove, Redditch and Wyre Forest. Bromsgrove, Redditch and the Rubery area are currently unparished, the rest of the area is parished. Bromsgrove and Redditch councils are considering the establishment of charter trustees to maintain civic identity.

The district is being formed as part of ongoing local government changes throughout England, in which all areas of the country that have separate county councils and district councils will see those replaced with single-tier, or unitary, local governance. A north/south split was backed by five of the six district councils in Worcestershire, with Worcestershire County Council's alternative proposal for a single unitary not being accepted. The remainder of the county will form a new South Worcestershire authority.

Decisions were announced in July 2026, with elections planned for May 2027 and the new authorities established in 2028. In September 2026, the Worcestershire proposals were halted by the government and placed under review. The 2027 election was cancelled. In October 2026, the plans were revived with the first election expected to take place in 2028 and the unitary authority established in 2029, subject to a three week consultation period. Worcestershire is one of only three areas where the proposals were not met with threat of judicial review.

== Governance ==
It will be run by North Worcestershire Council, which will comprise 54 councillors.

== Geography ==
The area includes the more urbanised northern part of Worcestershire near to the West Midlands metropolitan county. The largest settlement will be Redditch and it will also include Bewdley, Bromsgrove, Kidderminster and Stourport-on-Severn. The area has a 2024 estimated population of 293,445.
