= University of Worcester =

Public university in Worcester, England

- Coat of Arms; University of Worcester
- Motto: Latin: Ad Inspirandum Aspiramus
- Motto in English: Aspire to Inspire
- Type: Public
- Established: 1946 – Worcester Emergency Teacher Training College; 1948 – Worcester Teacher Training College; 1976 – Worcester College of Higher Education; 1997 – University College Worcester (Given degree awarding powers); 2005 – University Status
- Chancellor: Prince Richard, Duke of Gloucester
- Vice-Chancellor: David Green
- Faculty: 300
- Administrative staff: 700
- Students: 8,755 (2024/25)
- Undergraduates: 6,840 (2024/25)
- Postgraduates: 1,915 (2024/25)
- Doctoral students: Up to 30 at any time
- Location: Worcester, England, UK; 52°11′53″N 02°14′37″W
- Campus: Urban
- Colours: Blue and White
- Website: worcester.ac.uk

The University of Worcester is a public research university, based in Worcester, England. With a history dating back to 1946, the university began awarding degrees in 1997 and was granted full university status in 2005.

== History ==
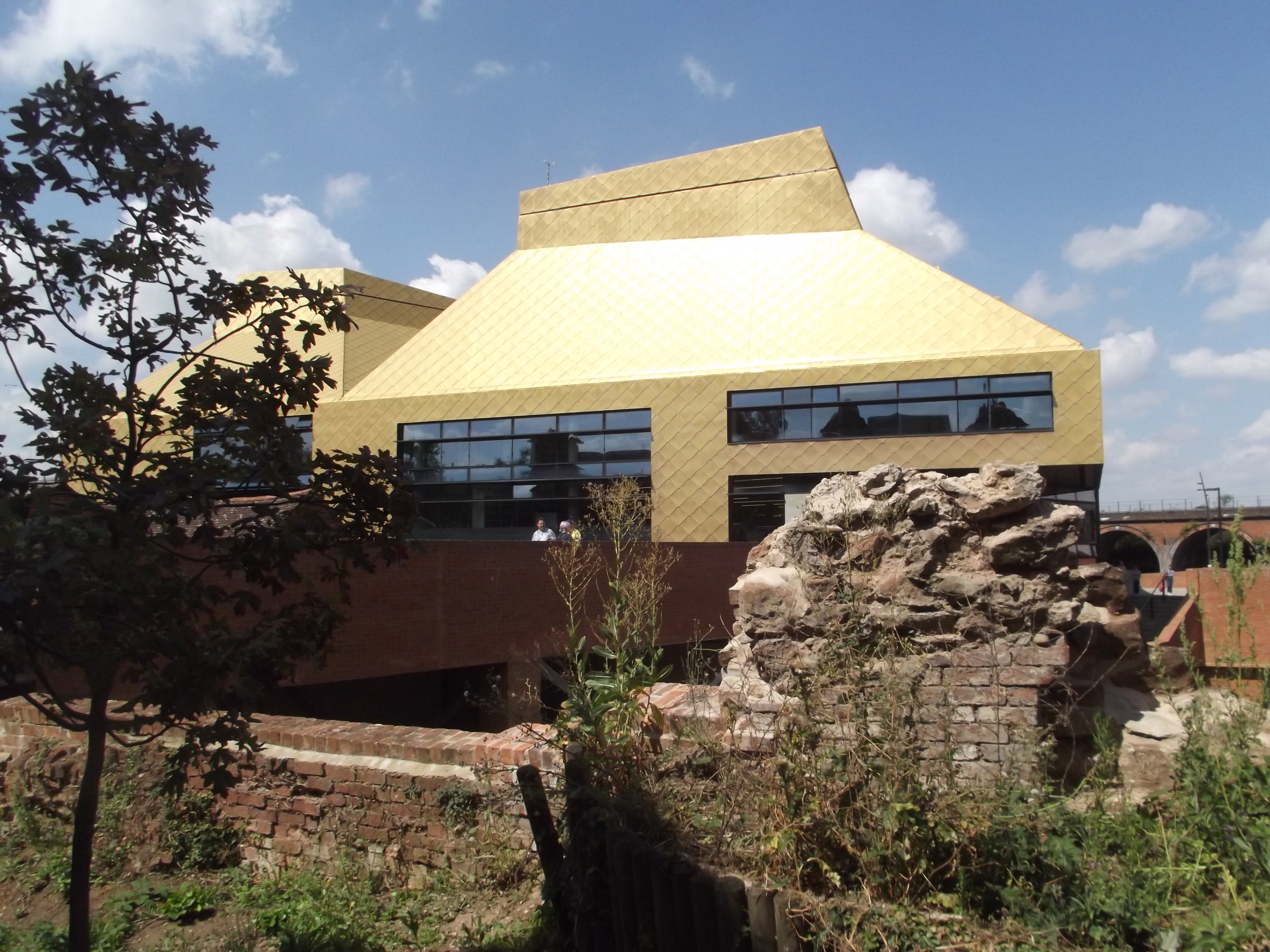
The Hive houses the university's academic library

In 1946 an Emergency teacher training college for the University of Birmingham was established in Worcester on the site of one of the former RAF bases used during the Second World War. Henry Hines came to Worcester from the Canterbury Technical Institute as the principal of the college. E.G. Peirson followed Hines's lead as the principal of the college from 1951 to 1978. During his time at the college, in the 1970s the Council for National Academic Awards validated the degrees for the Worcester College of Higher Education and the former Peirson Library, now The Peirson Study and Guidance Centre was opened. The third principal of the college, David Shadbolt, started his leadership in 1978 bringing a new system of organisation, based around three schools – Education and Teaching Studies, Arts and Sciences. In 1992, Dorma Urwin became the new principal and Coventry University agreed to validate the institution's degree courses. The Herefordshire and Worcestershire College of Nursing and Midwifery was absorbed in 1995. In 1997 the Privy Council affirmed the institution's degree-awarding powers and it subsequently became known as University College Worcester. In 2003, David Green was appointed as Dorma Urwin's successor and later became the vice chancellor of the institution. In 2005 the Privy Council granted university status. The institution was renamed "University of Worcester" in September of that year. In 2010 HM Privy Council conferred research degree-awarding powers on the university. In the same year, the university opened the City campus in the renovated former infirmary to create a home for the Business School. Two years later, in 2012, the university opened The Hive, a £60 million facility focused on learning resources, technology, social and study spaces. This facility is a joint venture between the university and Worcestershire County Council and was officially opened by Queen Elizabeth II.

In 2021, the university decided to close its archaeology department, with the change to come into effect the end of the 2021/22 academic year; this led to a petition being started, asking the vice-chancellor and executive board to reconsider the decision.

== Locations ==
Since 2005, the university has expanded greatly and acquired many new sites across the city of Worcester. Its long-term strategy includes building joint community and university facilities, and expanding to a 4th campus.

=== St John's Campus ===
The university's main campus is known as St John's and is the main base for all courses, support departments and academic institutes, except those related to business, computing, marketing or management. The site contains Halls of Residence with over 872 rooms, a sports centre, sports pitches, facilities for training nurses, midwives, and physician associates, a commercial standard digital arts centre and motion performance centre. The Peirson Centre provides study spaces, as well as ICT facilities, support and a Student Guidance Centre. The campus is located close to the local area of St John's, Worcester.

=== City Campus ===
The university's second campus is known as City Campus, and is the home of the Worcester Business School. The campus opened in September 2010 on the site of the former Worcester Royal Infirmary in Infirmary Walk. The buildings of the original infirmary, which remain, are the work of the noted eighteenth-century architect Anthony Keck. Work began in January 2007, and cost approximately £120 million. Phase 1 was completed in time for the 2010 academic year. As part of this, new Halls of Residence with accommodation for 250 students were completed on the site as well as the restoration of the main buildings. All Worcester Business School courses are run here, including undergraduate and postgraduate courses. A latter addition is the Art House, which sits opposite City Campus on Castle Street and is the hub of the School of Arts. Created from a former Carpet Warehouse (and before that a 1930's Art Deco garage known as Austin House) and refurbished by GWP Architects. The building is only the third building in the whole of the UK to earn a Gold standard for environmental sustainability. The Jenny Lind Chapel has been refurbished to its original state as has the boardroom in which the British Medical Association was founded in 1832. The history of the building inspired the development of an interactive exhibition, The Infirmary, which opened on City Campus in 2012. Phase 2 has had to be reviewed due to deep cuts in government funding and caps on student numbers, and is no longer considered feasible due to current budget deficits.

=== Riverside and Worcester Arena ===
In addition, the university occupies a large site adjacent to the River Severn, now known as "Riverside". This includes an Art Space & Exhibition building and a 2,000-seat-capacity sports arena built as a new facility for sports, events, a base for the Worcester Wolves basketball team, a national centre of excellence for disability sports and as a further teaching and office space. The facility, known as Worcester Arena is also accessible to the local community.

=== Lakeside Campus (outdoor education centre) ===
Lakeside Campus is located in the Worcestershire countryside, just a 10-minute drive from the main campus. The 50-acre (20 ha) site includes watersports lake, grass pitches, woodlands and an activity centre

=== The Hive (library and study facility) ===
The Hive, a joint venture between the University of Worcester and Worcestershire County Council, was officially opened by The Queen in July 2012. The library is adjacent to the City Campus site in the centre of Worcester and brings a range of services under one roof including a fully integrated public and university library with adult, children's and academic sections, the Worcestershire Archive and Record Office, the Worcestershire Historic Environment and Archaeology Service, the County Archive record store and the Worcestershire County Council Hub Customer Service Centre.

The Hive contains over a quarter of a million books and 12 miles (19 km) of archive collections, together with meeting rooms, exhibition spaces and a studio theatre. Individual and group working areas are provided throughout the five floors together with over 500 desktop computers.

=== University Park ===
The university plans to develop a third campus on the disused Grove Farm, a 47-acre (190,000 m^{2}) piece of land 1 mi (1.6 km) from St John's campus. It is adjacent to the A44 and well connected to the city's transport network. This third site is expected to take fifteen years to complete and will form part of a Business and Enterprise Park alongside expanded science, business and sport institutes. Parts of the site will also develop the university's work in healthcare and wellbeing, again in partnership with local providers.

=== Other locations ===
The university also owns or operates various other halls and sports facilities across the city of Worcester, but these are not major university sites or campuses.

The university is one of the official venues to be included in the London 2012 Pre-Games Training Camp Guide. The guide features facilities and venues across the UK suitable for use by international sporting teams as a training base in the run up to and during the Olympic and Paralympic Games in 2012.

=== Environmental standing ===
The institution has been awarded the Carbon Trust Standard. and it was the first university in England to receive a Gold EcoCampus Award for the whole organisation, just shortly after being awarded the Silver Eco-Campus status in 2008. The Green League awarded the university 16th position out of 18, for the First Class award among a total number of 126 contenders for the First Class, Upper Second Class, Lower Second Class, and Third Class awards.

== Organisation and structure ==
On Thursday 10 April 2008, the Duke of Gloucester was installed as the founding chancellor of the university in a ceremony at Worcester Cathedral. The duke officiates at degree ceremonies, attends major events (including the Duke of Gloucester Lecture Series) and promotes the university overseas. The College of Fellows was established in 2008 to bring together high-profile "ambassadors" for the university. New Fellows are appointed at the annual graduation ceremonies in Worcester Cathedral. The board of governors meets regularly and is composed of appointed governors, staff governors, student governors and co-opted governors from a wide range of business and community areas. An executive management board meets weekly, and this is the primary decision-making body of the institution.

The seven faculties include, Institute of Education, Institute of Health and Society, Institute of the Arts, Institute of Humanities, Institute of Science and the Environment, Institute of Sport and Exercise Science, and the Worcester Business School. Each academic institute hosts an academic support unit which assists both lecturers and students with administration issues directly relevant to the department.

During 2018 the university began a restructuring process including the reorganisation of institute faculties into academic schools. The ten academic schools include: School of allied health & community, School of the arts, School of education, School of humanities, School of nursing & midwifery, School of psychology, School of science & the environment, School of sport & exercise science, Worcester business school and the University of Worcester international college.

== Academic profile ==
=== Reputation and rankings ===
Rankings
National rankings
- Complete (2027): 80
- Guardian (2026): 114
- Times / Sunday Times (2026): 98

Global rankings
- THE (2026): 1501+

An Ofsted report for the overall standard of the Institute of Education's teaching programme rated the university as "Excellent". The training of teachers was rated ‘Outstanding’ by OFSTED in June 2010. Results in the first four National Student Surveys have placed Worcester in the top 40 universities for student satisfaction in 2008, the most satisfied being in English, History and Teacher Training.

In March 2010, the university was ranked 54th of the top public sector places to work.

== Research ==
In August 2010 the university was granted research degree-awarding powers, enabling it to confer the awards of MPhil and PhD. Before this Coventry University assisted in the academic awarding of these degrees. The university includes eight national research centres:

- The National Pollen and Aerobiology Research Unit from where all UK national pollen forecasts originate, and testing of new hay fever and anti-allergen devices is conducted.
- The Centre for Rural Research, which examined the psychological effects of the mass flooding in the UK in recent years.
- The International Centre for Children's Literature, Literacy and Creativity is, with University of Cambridge and Roehampton University, one of the three UK university centres to employ full-time children's literature professors.
- The Motion Performance Centre which looks at sports injuries, and rehabilitation techniques using motion capture technology. The Human Performance Laboratories work alongside to provide data on exercise and how it affects the body.
- The Centre for People @ Work
- The Centre for Applied Health Research
- The Association for Dementia Studies was launched at the university in February 2010.

== Student life ==
Worcester Students' Union is the representative body for students studying at the University of Worcester, and a member of the National Union of Students. It is based in a building on the St Johns Campus. It provides a number of services and facilities. The union is led by a team of elected officers the president, a vice-president (education), a vice-president (student activities), and 7 non-sabbatical officers with varying portfolio responsibilities. The official Students' Union newspaper for the university is called The Voice.

=== Sports activities ===
The university is home to the Worcester Wolves basketball team, the league winning Worcester Allstars Football team and the Worcester Royals, an American Football team. The university has England Blind Footballers as some of its students.

The university also have a multi-year partnership with local Premier 15s side Worcester Warriors Women who have been renamed 'University of Worcester Warriors' as part of the deal.

== Notable alumni ==
- Waqar Azmi, diplomat and former chief adviser to the prime minister, Cabinet Office
- Pat Brown, cricketer
- Sophie Carrigill, paralympian
- Alan Dickens, rugby player
- Fawzia Gilani-Williams, author and scholar
- Elona Gjebrea, Albanian politician
- Judith Hamer, paralympian
- Matthew Hudson-Smith, olympic athlete
- Daryl Mitchell, cricketer
- Kyle Pryor, actor
- Matthew Raggett, educationalist
- Y. S. Avinash Reddy, Indian MP
- Swaroop Sampat, actress and Femina Miss India 1979
- John Shimmin, politician
- Jacqui Smith, politician
- Rosie Spaughton, YouTuber
- Rob Taylor, footballer
- Imogen Thomas, model
- Adam Willis, footballer
- Fatbardhe Hetemaj, politician and author

== See also ==
- Armorial of UK universities
- College of Education
- List of universities in the UK
