= Metalrax =

UK bakeware company

- Company type: Public company
- Industry: Bakeware
- Founded: 1964
- Defunct: 2013
- Fate: Was put into administration and sold off in parts
- Headquarters: Worcestershire, United Kingdom
- Area served: United Kingdom
- Products: Non-stick bakeware, wine racks, Wooden and plastic kitchenware

Metalrax was a British company that was the main supplier of non-stick coated steel bakeware to the UK market, since the 1960s. It was based in the West Midlands and was also the trade (product) name of a series of manufacturing companies. It was at one point Europe's largest supplier of non-stick coated steel for the bakeware industry.

== History ==
Metalrax was, historically, a Worcestershire company. By 1979, the company was formed of eighteen subsidiary companies, which made other types of non-bakeware industrial products. Its bakeware products were made of steel and aluminium.

On Tuesday 17 March 1964, the company was listed on the London Stock Exchange as Metalrax (Holdings), through the amalgamation of four companies. Th company was incorporated on 27 February 1964. It became Metalrax Group in January 1982.

It was owned by Metalrax Group, which was bought out after it lost a main contract for a UK supermarket in July 2012, and had been listed on the Alternative Investment Market (AIM) from June 2008.

In 2013, the group suddenly collapsed and went into administration after having experienced difficult trading conditions primarily within their consumer durables division. The administrators sold off its subsidiaries to a number of different buyers saving nearly 400 jobs.

The company had a management buy-out in July 2017. Another division of the company, EWS a cold roll forming company for housing fenestration and the UK market leader, on the A449 south of M54 junction 2 was bought in July 2018.

Cooper Coated Coil (CCC) company, another subsidiary of Metalrax, was sold off and operates from the Steelpark Trading Estate in Wednesfield off the A4124, which makes non-stick coatings of steel.

== Products ==
- Wine racks
- Wooden and plastic housewares
- Non-stick bakeware (coated with polytetrafluoroethylene, or PTFE)
