= Elona Gjebrea =

Albanian politician (born 1968)

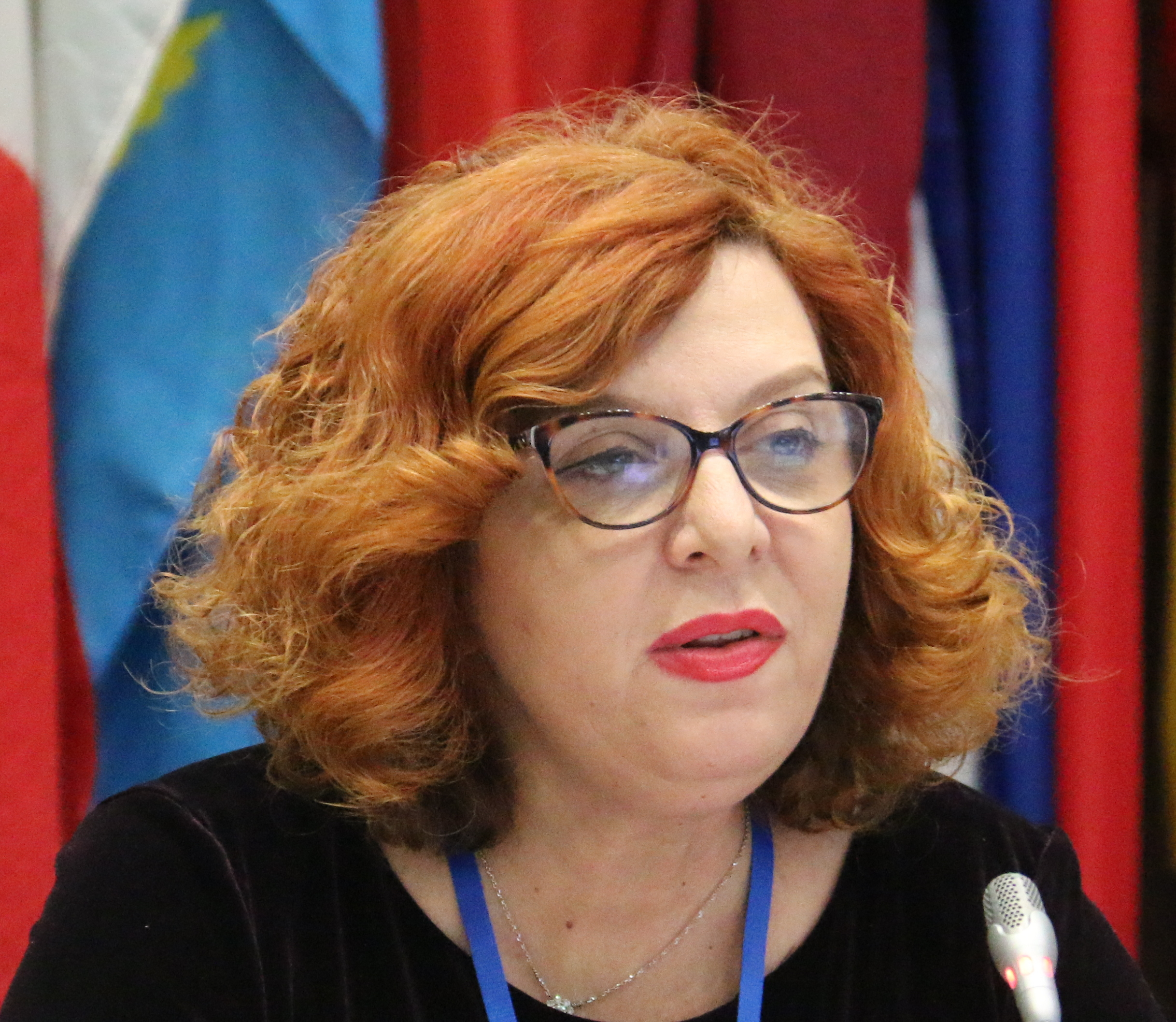

Deputy Minister of the Interior
- In office 2017–2020

Deputy Minister of Internal Affairs and National Anti-Trafficking Coordinator

Personal details
- Born: 18 May 1968 (age 58) Tirana, Albania
- Party: Socialist Party of Albania
- Education: University of Tirana; University of Worcester; Coventry University

Elona Hoxha Gjebrea (born 18 May 1968) is an Albanian politician of the Socialist Party of Albania. She was the Deputy Minister of the Interior in the Albanian government and has also worked as a rapporteur in the Organization for Security and Co-operation in Europe (OSCE).

== Education and early career ==
Gjebrea was born 18 May 1968 in Tirana. Gjebrea studied a degree in biology at the Faculty of Natural Sciences, University of Tirana. She then studied a master's degree in Aerobiology from Faculty of Natural Sciences at the University of Tirana and a PhD from the University of Worcester in cooperation with Coventry University in England.

Between 1992 and 2002, Gjebrea worked as an aerobiologist at the "Mother Teresa" University Hospital Center. In December 1995, she completed a research study in aerobiology at the Swedish Museum of Natural History.

From May 2000 to May 2005, Gjebrea was a part-time lecturer in biology at the University of Nursing.

== Political career ==
In 2013, Gjebrea became the Albanian Deputy Minister of Internal Affairs and National Anti-Trafficking Coordinator. In 2017, Gjebrea was elected as a Member of Parliament to the Parliament of Albania for the Socialist Party of Albania. Gjebrea served as Deputy Minister of the Interior for three and a half years. She was also director of the Albanian Center for Population and Development (ACPD). In July 2020, Gjebrea addressed the Free Iran Global Summit.

Gjebrea then became a rapporteur with the Organization for Security and Co-operation in Europe (OSCE). She was elected at the 2018 Annual Session in Berlin and was re-elected at the 2019 Annual Session in Luxembourg. In 2020, she led the OSCE Parliamentary Assembly's observation delegation to Azerbaijan. In 2021, she led the OSCE Parliamentary Assembly's observation delegation to the Bulgarian elections and was also leader of a short-term election mission in Georgia.

In 2022, Gjebrea was elected as representative of Albania to the Italian organization Environmental Medicine (SIMA, Societa Italiana di Medicina Ambientale). In 2023, she suggested that Albania is ready to make menstrual leave a reality.

In October 2025, Gjebrea spoke on News24 about the demographic challenges in Albania, with the number of deaths in exceeding that of births.
