= Hereford and Worcester County Council =

UK non-metropolitan county council

History
- Founded: 1 April 1974
- Disbanded: 31 March 1998
- Succeeded by: Herefordshire Council; Worcestershire County Council

Meeting place
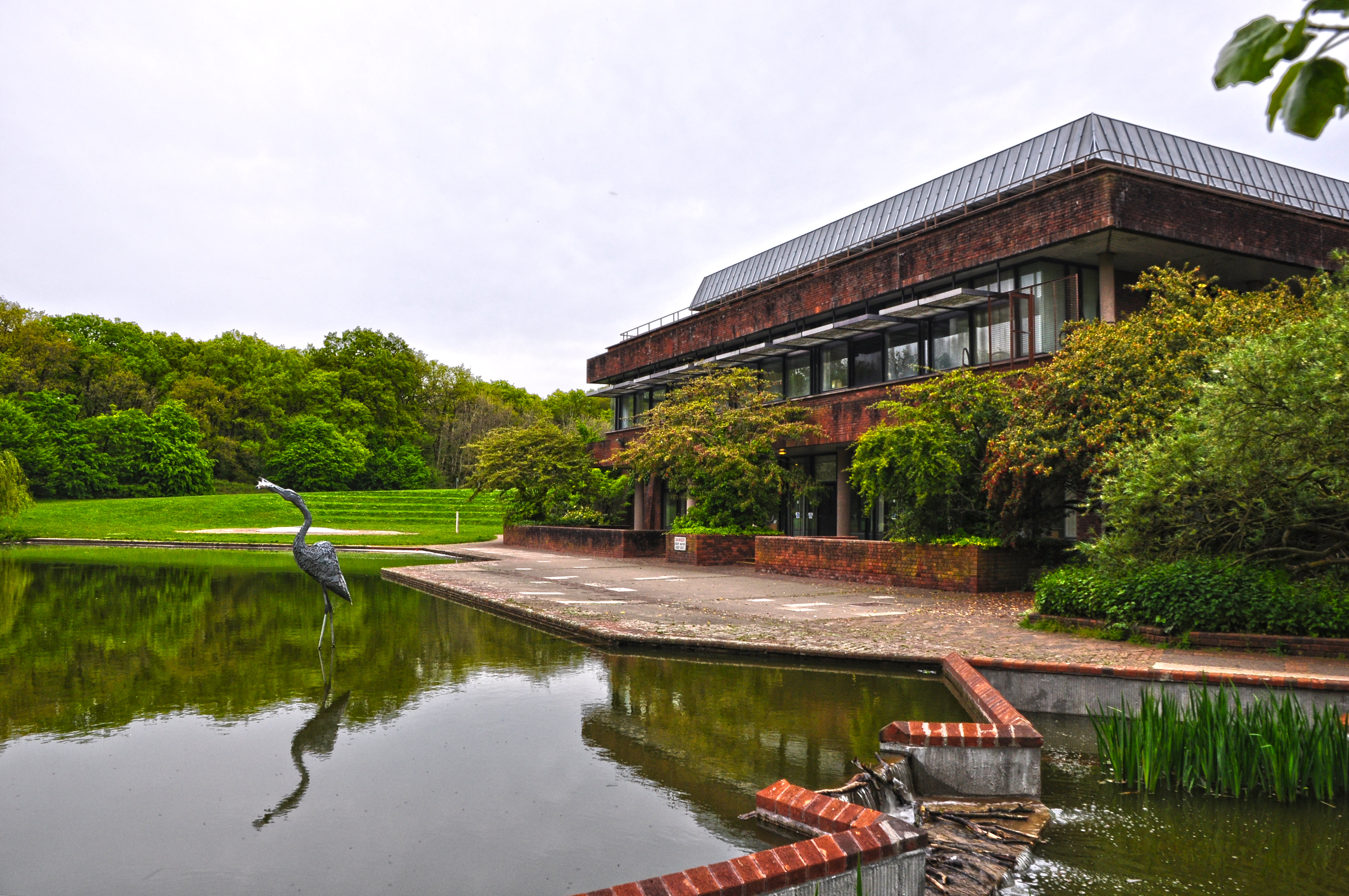
- County Hall, Worcester

Hereford and Worcester County Council was the county council of the non-metropolitan county of Hereford and Worcester in west England. It came into its powers on 1 April 1974 and was abolished on 31 March 1998. The county council was based at County Hall in Worcester. It was replaced by Herefordshire Council and Worcestershire County Council.

== Political control ==
The first elections to the council were held in 1973, initially operating as a shadow authority until the new arrangements came into effect on 1 April 1974. Political control of the council from 1974 until its abolition in 2009 was as follows:

Party	Tenure
No overall control	1974–1977
Conservative	1977–1989
No overall control	1989–1998

=== Leadership ===
The leaders of the council from 1977 until its abolition in 1998 were:

Councillor	Party	From	To
Joan Hadley	Conservative	1977	1981
Bill Allington	Conservative	1981	1985
David Finch	Conservative	1985	1989
Bob Bullock	Conservative	1989	1993
Liz Tucker	Liberal Democrats	1993	1998

== Council elections ==
- 1973 Hereford and Worcester County Council election
- 1977 Hereford and Worcester County Council election
- 1981 Hereford and Worcester County Council election
- 1985 Hereford and Worcester County Council election
- 1989 Hereford and Worcester County Council election
- 1993 Hereford and Worcester County Council election
