= Worcestershire =

County of England

Coordinates: 52°12′N 2°10′W

- Non-metropolitan and ceremonial county
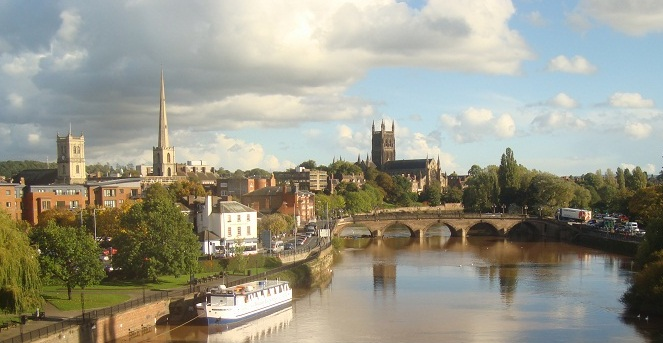
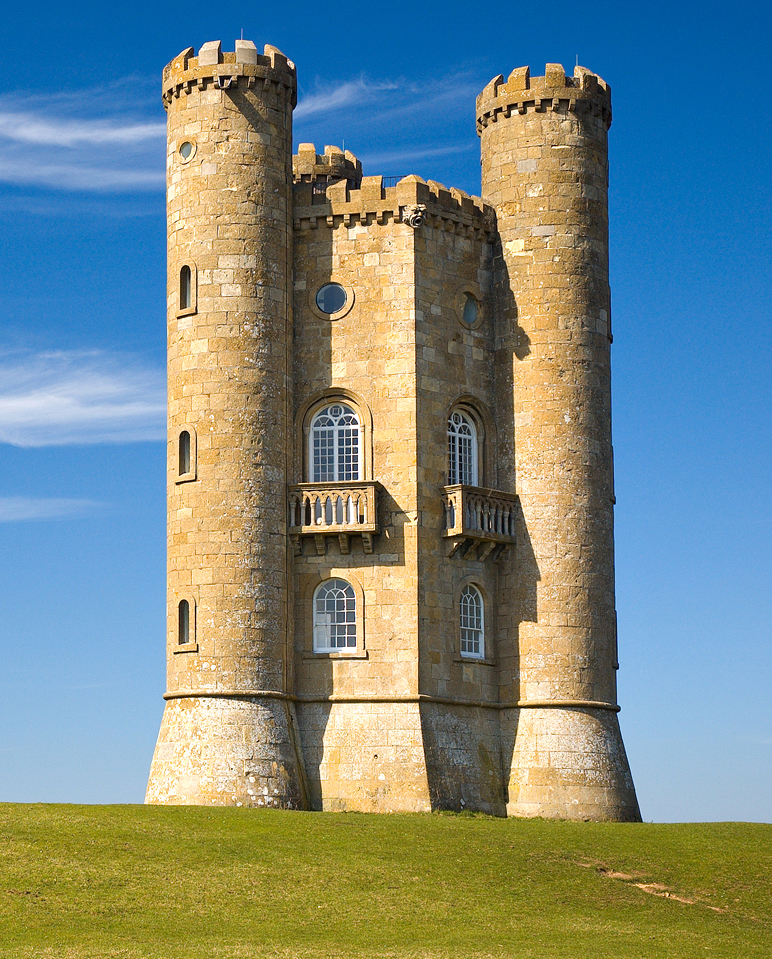
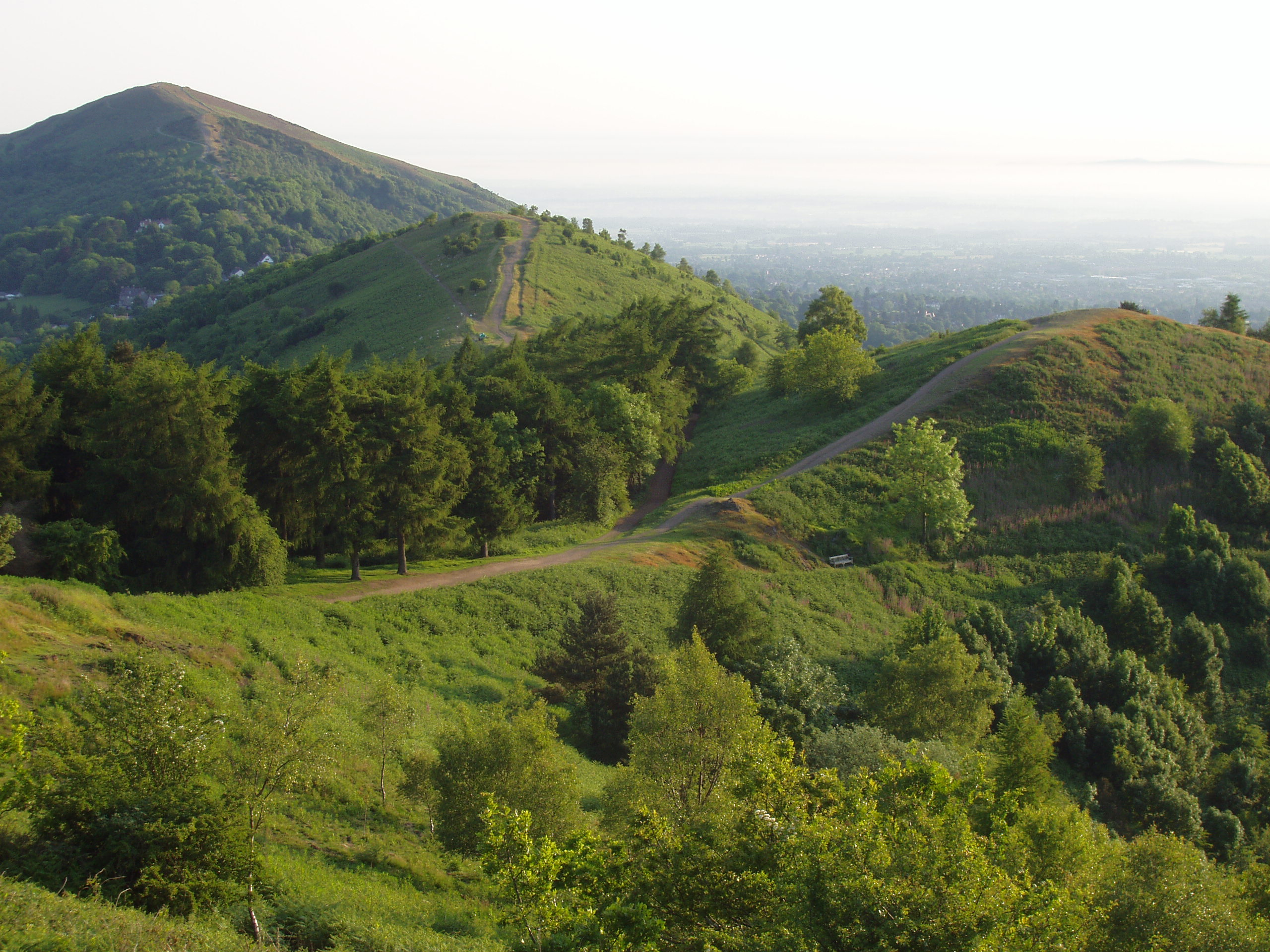
- Worcester; Broadway Tower in the Cotswolds, and the Malvern Hills on the Worcestershire–Herefordshire border

- Worcestershire within England
- Sovereign state: United Kingdom
- Constituent country: England
- Region: West Midlands
- Established: 1 April 1998
- Established by: Local Government Commission for England
- Preceded by: Hereford and Worcester
- Origin: Ancient
- Time zone: UTC+0 (GMT)
  - Summer (DST): UTC+1 (BST)
- UK Parliament: 6 MPs
- Police: West Mercia Police
- Ceremonial county
- Lord Lieutenant: Beatrice Grant
- High Sheriff: Maynard Vincent Burton
- Area: 1,741 km^{2} (672 sq mi)
  - Rank: 34th of 48
- Population (2024): 621,360
  - Rank: 39th of 48
  - Density: 357/km^{2} (920/sq mi)
- Non-metropolitan county
- County council: Worcestershire County Council
- Control: No overall control
- Admin HQ: Worcester
- Area: 1,741 km^{2} (672 sq mi)
  - Rank: 18th of 21
- Population (2025): 624,209
  - Rank: 20th of 21
  - Density: 359/km^{2} (930/sq mi)
- ISO 3166-2: GB-WOR
- GSS code: E10000034
- ITL: TLG12
- Website: worcestershire.gov.uk
- Districts
- Districts of Worcestershire
- Districts: List: Worcester; Malvern Hills; Wyre Forest; Bromsgrove; Redditch; Wychavon

Worcestershire (/ˈwʊstərʃər/ WUUST-ər-shər, /-ʃɪər/ -sheer; written abbreviation: Worcs) is a ceremonial county in the West Midlands of England. It is bordered by Shropshire, Staffordshire, and the West Midlands county to the north, Warwickshire to the east, Gloucestershire to the south, and Herefordshire to the west. The city of Worcester is the largest settlement.

The county, which is largely rural, has an area of 1,741 km^{2} (672 sq mi) and had an estimated population of 621,360 in 2024. Worcester is near the centre of the county on the River Severn. Other settlements include Kidderminster in the north, Redditch and Bromsgrove in the north-east, Evesham in the south-east, and the spa town of Malvern in the south-west. For local government purposes Worcestershire is a non-metropolitan county with six districts. The county historically had complex boundaries, and included Dudley and the southwestern suburbs of Birmingham.

The River Severn flows through the centre of the county from north to south, forming a wide plain. The south-west of the county contains part of the Malvern Hills, a National Landscape which contains Worcestershire Beacon, at 425 m (1,394 ft) the county's highest point. The southeast contains a small part of the Cotswolds, and in the northwest is part of the Wyre Forest, a national nature reserve.

There is some evidence of Roman occupation in Worcestershire; the area later became part of the Anglo-Saxon kingdom of Hwicce, and then Mercia. Worcestershire was constituted as a county around 927, as the Kingdom of England formed. During the High Middle Ages the county was the site of the Battle of Evesham, in which Simon de Montfort was defeated, and in 1651 the Battle of Worcester was the last major engagement of the Wars of the Three Kingdoms. During the Industrial Revolution the north of the county was part of the Black Country, a major manufacturing centre, Kidderminster became famous for carpet production, and Worcester for porcelain.

== Location ==
The county borders Herefordshire to the west, Shropshire to the north-west, Staffordshire only just to the north, West Midlands to the north and north-east, Warwickshire to the east and Gloucestershire to the south. The western border with Herefordshire includes a stretch along the top of the Malvern Hills. At the southern border with Gloucestershire, Worcestershire meets the northern edge of the Cotswolds. Two major rivers flow through the county: the Severn and the Avon.

== History ==
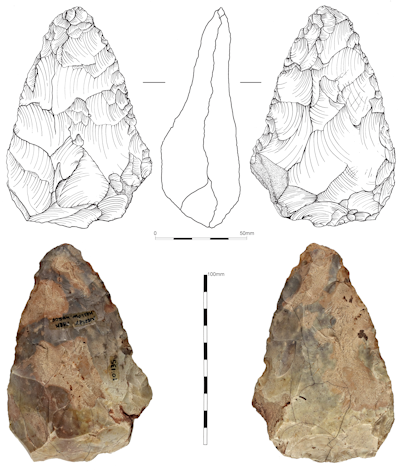
The hand axe discovered in 1970s in Hallow. Potentially the first Early Middle Palaeolithic artefact from the West Midlands.

The geographical area now known as Worcestershire was first populated at least 700,000 years ago. The area became predominantly agricultural in the Bronze Age, leading to population growth and more evidence of settlement. By the Iron Age, hill forts dominated the landscape. Settlement of these swiftly ended with the Roman occupation of Britain.

The Roman period saw establishment of the villa system in the Cotswolds and Vale of Evesham. Droitwich (Salinae) was probably the most important settlement in the county in this period, due to its product of salt. There is also evidence for Roman settlement and industrial activity around Worcester and King's Norton.

=== Anglo-Saxon Worcestershire ===
The area which became Worcestershire formed the heartland of the Anglo-Saxon kingdom of the Hwicce. It was absorbed by the Kingdom of Mercia during the 7th century and became part of the unified Kingdom of England in 927. Worcestershire was established as an administrative and defensive unit in the early tenth century. Its purpose was to take into account and defend the estates within the northern area of the historic See of Worcester, held by the Episcopus Hwicciorum and Worcester Priory, along with the Abbots of Pershore, Westminster and Evesham. The shires and its sub-divisions known as hundreds, formed a framework for administering the resources of each burhs' outlying estates. It was a separate ealdormanship briefly in the 10th century before forming part of the Earldom of Mercia in the 11th century. The last known Anglo-Saxon Sheriff of Worcestershire was Cyneweard of Laughern.

=== Norman Conquest ===
During the Middle Ages, much of the county's economy was based on the wool trade. Many areas of its dense forests, such as Feckenham Forest, Horewell Forest and Malvern Chase, were royal hunting grounds subject to forest law.

After the Norman Conquest of England; the Domesday Book noted in 1086 that in seven of the twelve hundreds covering Worcestershire, the Crown had no authority. The Crown's authority was replaced by the Bishop of Worcester and the Abbots at Pershore, Westminster and Evesham.

William the Conqueror gave to his allies and friends manors and parishes captured from the Anglo-Saxons. Despite the Norman Conquest, the rest of the county was still held by the Abbeys of Pershore and Evesham, the Bishop of Worcester and Priory.

The first Norman Sheriff Urse d'Abetot, built the castle of Worcester and seized much church land, some of which became part of the Crown's hundreds in Worcestershire. and was in dispute with the Bishop of Worcester over the rights of the sheriff.

Bishop Wulfstan was the last Anglo-Saxon bishop in England, and remained in post until his death in 1095. Under his tenure Worcester Cathedral began major reconstruction, and he opposed political interventions against William and the Normans. He was later made a saint.

=== High Medieval ===
During Henry III's disputes and wars with his Barons, in 1263 Worcester's Jewish residents were attacked by a baronial force led by Robert Earl Ferrers and Henry de Montfort. Most were killed. The massacre in Worcester was part of a wider campaign by the De Montforts and their allies in the run-up to the Second Barons' War, aimed at undermining Henry III. Worcestershire was the site of the Battle of Evesham in which Simon de Montfort was killed on 4 August 1265. (Note: Simon de Montfort had previously been engaged in a campaign of persecution of Jewish communities in Leicester.) A few years later, in 1275, the Jews that were still living in Worcester were forced to move to Hereford, as they were expelled from all towns under the jurisdiction of the queen mother.

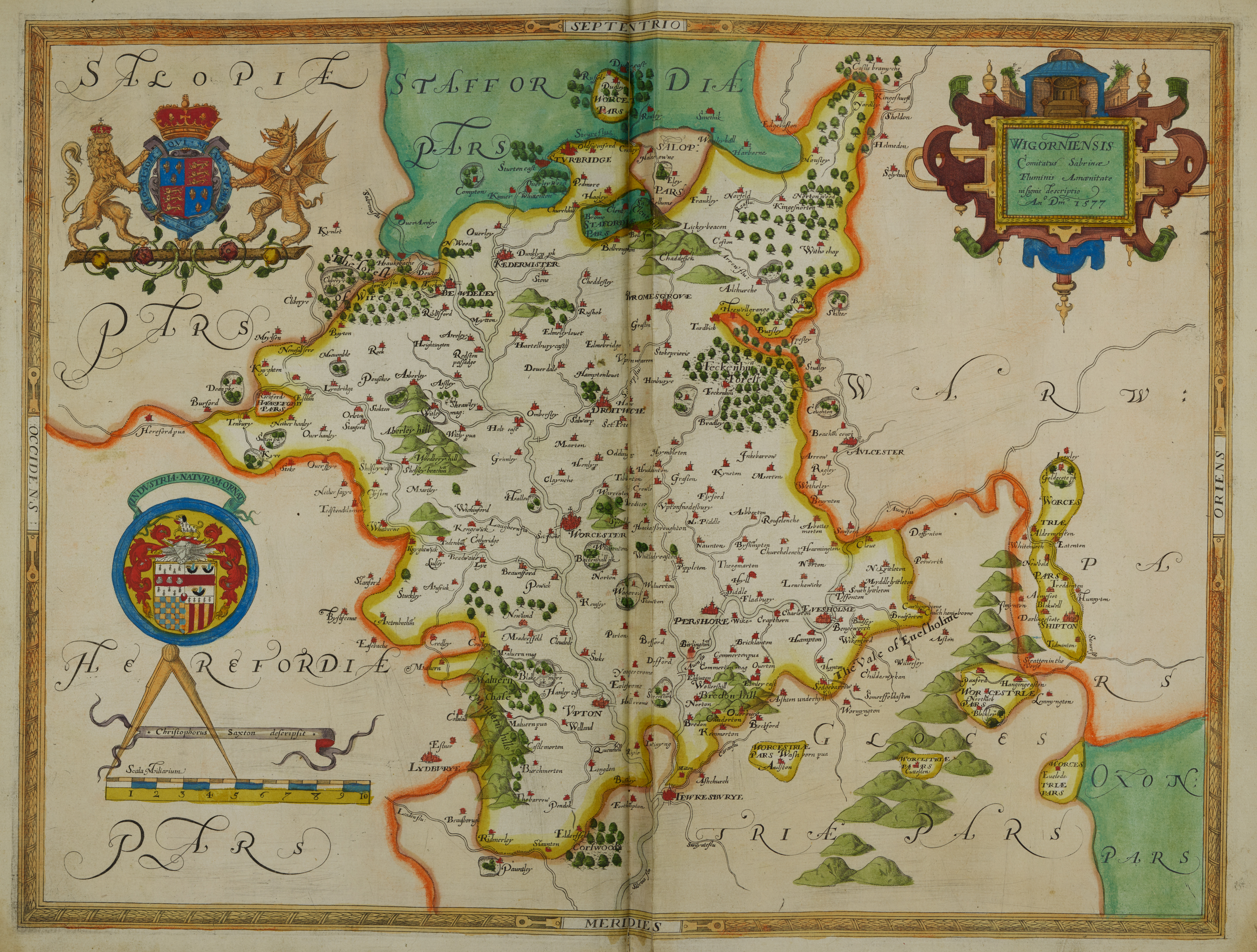
Hand-drawn map of Worcestershire by Christopher Saxton from 1577.

=== Civil War ===
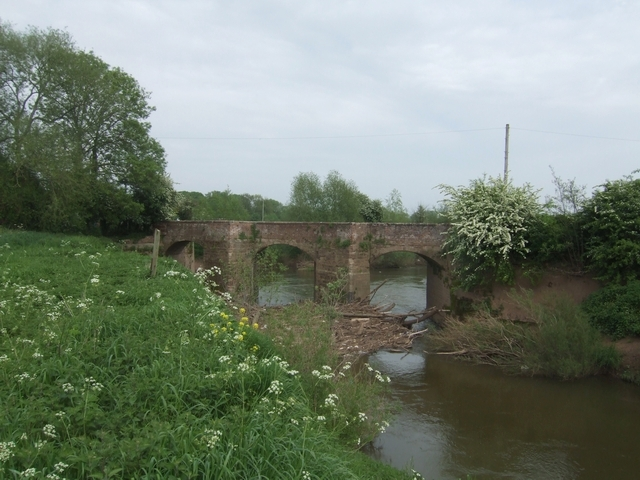
The Battle of Powick Bridge on the River Teme on 23 September 1642 began the English Civil War.

In 1642, the Battle of Powick Bridge was the first major skirmish of the English Civil War. The county suffered from being on the Royalist front line, as it was subject to heavy taxation and the pressing of men into the Royalist army, which also reduced its productive capacity. The northern part of the county, which was already a centre of iron production, was important for military supplies. Parliamentarian raids and Royalist requisitioning both placed a great strain on the county.

There were tensions from the participation of prominent Catholic recusants in the military and civilian organisation of the county. Combined with the opposition to requisitioning from both sides, bands of Clubmen formed to keep the war away from their localities.

The Battle of Worcester in 1651 effectively ended the third civil war. There was little enthusiasm or local participation in the mostly Scottish Royalist army, whose defeat was widely welcomed. Nevertheless, Parliamentarian forces ransacked the city of Worcester, causing heavy damage, looting and destruction of property. Around 10,000 mostly Scottish prisoners were sent into forced labour in the New World or fen drainage schemes. The small bands of Scots that fled into Worcestershire's countryside were attacked by local forces and killed.

=== Nineteenth century ===
The flag of the historic county of Worcestershire

In the 19th century, Worcester was a centre for the manufacture of gloves; the town of Kidderminster became a centre for carpet manufacture, and Redditch specialised in the manufacture of needles, springs and hooks. Droitwich Spa, situated on large deposits of salt, was a centre of salt production from Roman times, with one of the principal Roman roads running through the town. These old industries have since declined, to be replaced by other, more varied light industry. The county is also home to the world's oldest continually published newspaper, the Berrow's Journal, established in 1690. Malvern was one of the centres of the 19th-century rise in English spa towns due to Malvern water being believed to be very pure, containing "nothing at all".

== Demographics ==
The 2011 census found the population of Worcestershire to be 566,169, an increase of 4.4% from the 2001 population of 542,107.

=== Ethnicity ===
Though the total number of people in every ethnic group increased between 2001 and 2011, the White British share of Worcestershire's population decreased from 95.5% to 92.4%, as did the share of White ethnic groups as whole, which went from 97.5% to 95.7%. Worcestershire is still much more ethnically homogeneous than the national average. In 2011, 79.8% of the population of England identified as White British; much lower than Worcestershire's figure of 92.4%.

Ethnic group	2001 population	2001 %	2011 population	2011 %
White: British	517,747	95.5	522,922	92.4
White: Irish	4,163	0.8	3,480	0.6
White: Irish Traveller/Gypsy (Note: In 2001 part of the White Other category. New category created for the 2011 census)			1,165	0.2
White: Other	6,869	1.27	14,491	2.6
White: Total	528,779	97.5	542,058	95.7
Asian or Asian British: Indian	1,640	0.3	3,634	0.6
Asian or Asian British: Pakistani	2,917	0.5	4,984	0.9
Asian or Asian British: Bangladeshi	970	0.2	1,316	0.2
Asian or Asian British: Chinese	1,106	0.2	1,601	0.3
Asian or Asian British: Asian Other	455	0.1	2,206	0.4
Asian or Asian British: Total	7,088	1.3	13,741	2.4
Black or Black British: Caribbean	1,153	0.2	1,275	0.2
Black or Black British: African	332	0.1	767	0.1
Black or Black British: Other	153	0.03	330	0.1
Black or Black British: Total	1,638	0.3	2,372	0.4
Mixed: White and Caribbean	1,704	0.3	3,150	0.6
Mixed: White and African	221	0.04	592	0.1
Mixed: White and Asian Other	1,099	0.2	2,053	0.4
Mixed: Other Mixed	771	0.1	1,250	0.2
British Mixed: Total	3,795	0.7	7,045	1.2
Other: Arab (Note: In 2001 part of the 'Other' category. New category created for the 2011 census)			236	0.04
Other: Any other ethnic group	807	0.1	717	0.1
Other: Total	807	0.1	953	0.2
Total	542,107	100	566,169	100

== Economy ==
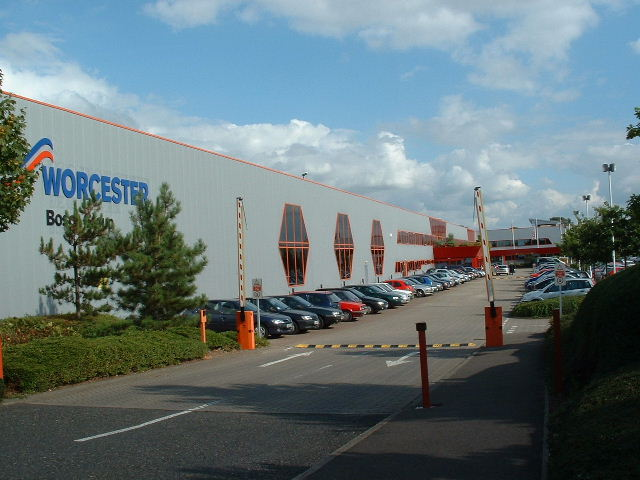
Worcester Bosch; Bosch Thermotechnology are in Warndon

In Redditch are Halfords, to the south in Washford, and GKN (it has the second largest turnover in the West Midlands) is in Riverside. Mettis Aerospace are in Enfield, north Redditch, and make light metal components ( former High Duty Alloys, which made most of the forged pistons for Britain's aircraft engines in WWII). Phoenix Group (non-public life assurance schemes) is in the north-east of the county near the Warwickshire boundary, at Wythall, and has a large turnover; nearby to west Metalrax, headquartered in Alvechurch, make (via subsidiaries) most of the bakeware sold in the UK.

Roger Dyson Group manufactures auto-recovery vehicles in north Droitwich. South of Bromsgrove, L.G. Harris & Co make paintbrushes. Lea & Perrins is in Worcester. Joy Mining Machinery are in the west of Worcester. Worcester, Bosch Group make 1,200 boilers a day. Mazak UK have the parent company's European manufacturing facility (for CNC machine tools) in the north of Worcester. Nearby on the Blackpole Ind Est, Froude Hofmann have their world headquarters, who make dynamometers.

Roxel UK develops solid-fuel rockets for missiles south of Kidderminster and in Hartlebury. The West Midlands Safari Park is in Bewdley, west of Kidderminster. Morgan Technical Ceramics is headquartered at Lickhill in Stourport-on-Severn. Egbert H. Taylor in Elmley Lovett, near Hartlebury is a manufacturer of metal bins.

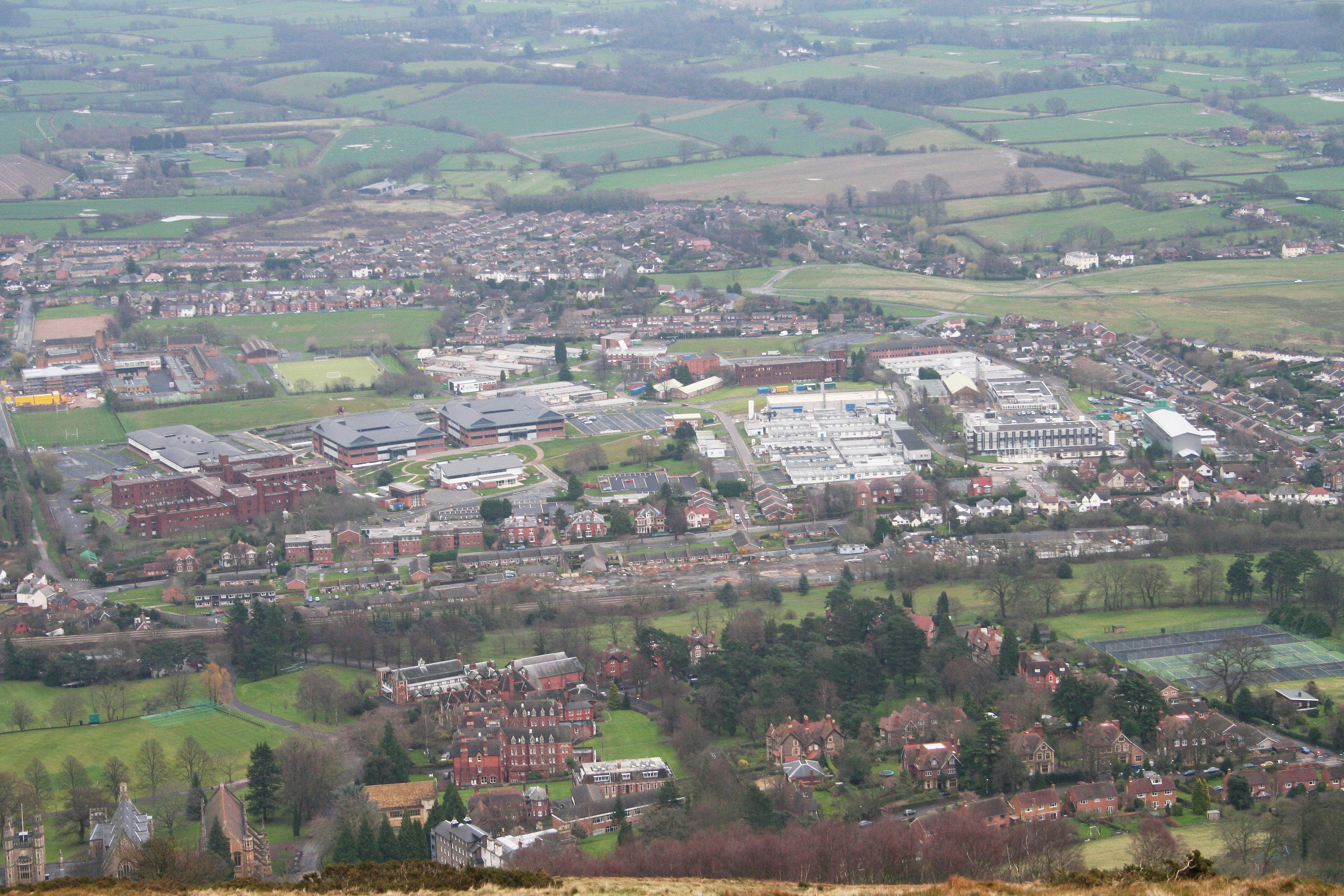
Qinetiq at the Malvern Hills Science Park, or Malvern Technology Centre; the integrated circuit was invented here in 1952

Liquid crystal displays were developed in 1972 in conjunction with the Royal Radar Establishment, where Geoffrey Dummer invented the idea of the integrated circuit in 1952. It was based in Malvern, and became the Royal Signals and Radar Establishment, which developed thermal imaging and pyroelectric infrared detectors, and is now a large site owned by QinetiQ. Morgan Motor Company is in Malvern Link. Commsoft RMS is in Evesham. For many years Group 4 Security, which was the largest security company in Europe, had its headquarters in Broadway, on the edge of the Cotswolds; G4S Integrated Services now has its HQ there.

== Local government ==
Local government in Worcestershire has changed several times since the middle of the 19th century.

=== 1844–1911 ===
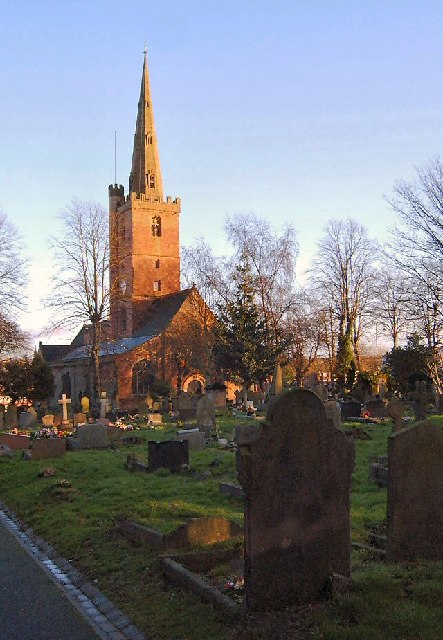
Halesowen was an exclave of neighbouring Shropshire until 1844 when it was reincorporated into Worcestershire. It is now within the metropolitan county of the West Midlands.

Worcestershire contained numerous exclaves, which were areas of land cut off from the main geographical area of Worcestershire and completely surrounded by the nearby counties of Warwickshire, Staffordshire, Gloucestershire, Herefordshire and Oxfordshire. The most notable islands were Dudley, Evenlode, Blockley and the area around Shipston-on-Stour. Herefordshire, Staffordshire, Warwickshire and Shropshire had their own exclaves within the main part of Worcestershire at Rochford, Broome, Clent, Tardebigge (Tutnall and Cobley) and Halesowen respectively. Tardebigge's history outside the county is even more colourful, changing hands from Worcestershire to Staffordshire and Warwickshire, before returning to Worcestershire at differing times over the centuries. The southern boundary of the county was also complex, with parish boundaries penetrating deep into Gloucestershire and vice versa.

Worcestershire County Council came into existence following the Local Government Act 1888 and covered the historic traditional county, except for two designated county boroughs at Dudley and Worcester.

Birmingham's continuous expansion has been a major cause of Worcestershire's fluid boundary changes and associated housing issues. The district of Balsall Heath, which had originally constituted the most northerly part of the parish of King's Norton, was the first area of the county to be added to the County Borough of Birmingham, on 1 October 1891. This was followed by Quinton Urban District, which was ceded to Birmingham in November 1909, and then by the Rural District of Yardley and the greater part of the Urban District of King's Norton and Northfield, which were absorbed into Birmingham under the Greater Birmingham Scheme on 9 November 1911. Thus these areas were transferred from Worcestershire to Warwickshire. Dudley's historical status within the Diocese of Worcester and through its aristocratic links ensured that the exclave was governed on a largely autonomous basis. Worcester was designated a county corporate, and thus became separate from the rest of Worcestershire.

=== 1926 boundary changes ===
In 1926, Dudley County Borough council purchased several square miles of land to the north of the town centre, mostly in Sedgley (Staffordshire), including Dudley Castle. This was to build the Priory Estate, a large new council estate on which construction began in 1929. The boundaries of Worcestershire were altered to include all of the proposed new housing estate in Dudley.

=== 1966–1974 ===
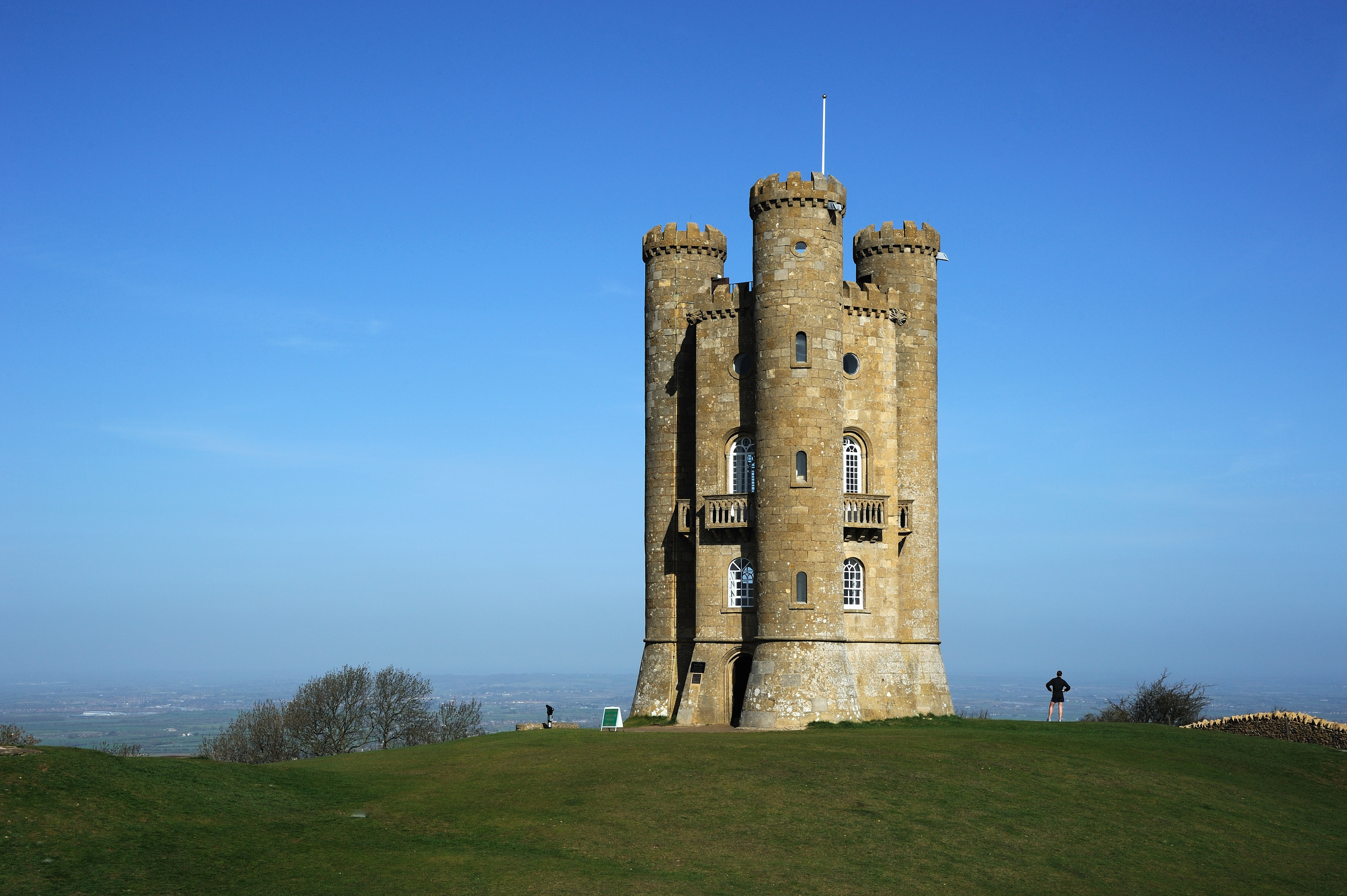
Broadway Tower, one of several Worcestershire follies

During the Local Government reorganisation of April 1966, Dudley expanded beyond its historical boundaries and took in the bulk of Sedgley, Brierley Hill and the south of Coseley as well as a small section of Amblecote. The Local Government Act redefined its status and the County Borough of Dudley became part of Staffordshire, the county of which all of these areas had been part. At the same time, Worcestershire gained a new county borough named Warley, which was an amalgamation of Oldbury Urban District, Rowley Regis Urban District, the County Borough of Smethwick and parts of Dudley and Tipton. During this reorganisation, the area of the administrative county grew only where Stourbridge took in the majority of Amblecote Urban District from Staffordshire and the designation of Redditch in 1964 as a new town. This in turn saw expansion into the area in and around the villages of Ipsley and Matchborough in Warwickshire. The Redditch New Town designation coincided with a considerable programme of social and private house building in Droitwich, Worcester, Bromsgrove, Kidderminster and along the Birmingham boundary at Frankley, Rubery and Rednal. Frankley parish was later split into two: New Frankley and the area around Bartley Reservoir transferred from Bromsgrove District to Birmingham in April 1995; but the small village of Frankley remained in Worcestershire and became a new civil parish under the same name.

=== 1974–1998 ===
From 1974, the central and southern parts of the county were amalgamated with Herefordshire and with Worcester County Borough to form a single non-metropolitan county of Hereford and Worcester. The County Boroughs of Dudley and Warley, along with Stourbridge and Halesowen, were incorporated into the new West Midlands Metropolitan county. The West Midlands County Council existed for twelve years before abolition in April 1986, although the West Midlands still exists as a ceremonial county.

=== 1998–present ===
The coat of arms of Worcestershire County Council

In the 1990s UK local government reform, the county of Hereford & Worcester was abolished, and the non-metropolitan county or shire county of Worcestershire regained its historic border with Herefordshire. The recreated County of Worcestershire came into existence on 1 April 1998 as an administrative and ceremonial county, although this excluded the Black Country towns of Dudley, Halesowen, Oldbury and Stourbridge (which remained part of the West Midlands). Worcestershire County Council was reformed, although some services are shared with the newly formed Herefordshire Council, including waste management and the youth offending service.

The former Hereford and Worcester districts of Redditch, Worcester, Bromsgrove, Wychavon and Wyre Forest were retained with little or no change. However the former Hereford and Worcester districts of Leominster and Malvern Hills straddled the reinstated border with Herefordshire, so a new Malvern Hills district was constituted which aligned with the Worcestershire's boundary to the west, south-west and north-west. The remaining parts of the former districts of Leominster and Malvern Hills returned to Herefordshire.

=== Summary of main changes ===
These settlements were historically part of the county as noted above, that now fall under the counties of Warwickshire, West Midlands or Gloucestershire.

Warwickshire	Shipston-on-Stour
West Midlands (County)	Certain areas of Birmingham (such as Bournville, Quinton and Yardley); Dudley; Dudley Wood; Halesowen; Lye; Netherton; Oldbury; Quarry Bank (partially in Warley Borough from 1966–1974); Rowley Regis (1966–74, constitutes Rowley, Blackheath, Cradley Heath, Tividale and Old Hill); Smethwick (1966–74); Stourbridge; Parts of West Bromwich (within Warley Borough from 1966–1974)
Gloucestershire	Tewkesbury (Mitton area only)

Large Settlements
(Cities appear in bold. Civil parishes used for population reference where applicable, otherwise the source with boundaries as accurate to the locality as possible has been chosen.)
As of the 2021 UK census, the five largest settlements in Worcestershire. – Red.

Settlements which were historically in (or partially in) Worcestershire at any point before 1974 boundary changes to the county, which as of the 2021 UK census had a population of 9000 or more. – Orange.

=== Future ===
In July 2026, the UK Government announced that it intends to reorganise Worcestershire into two unitary authority areas by April 2028. The county will be divided north–south, with the northern area combining the current districts of Bromsgrove, Redditch, and Wyre Forest to form a new North Worcestershire unitary authority and the southern area combining Malvern, Worcester, and Wychavon to form a new South Worcestershire unitary authority.

== Physical geography ==
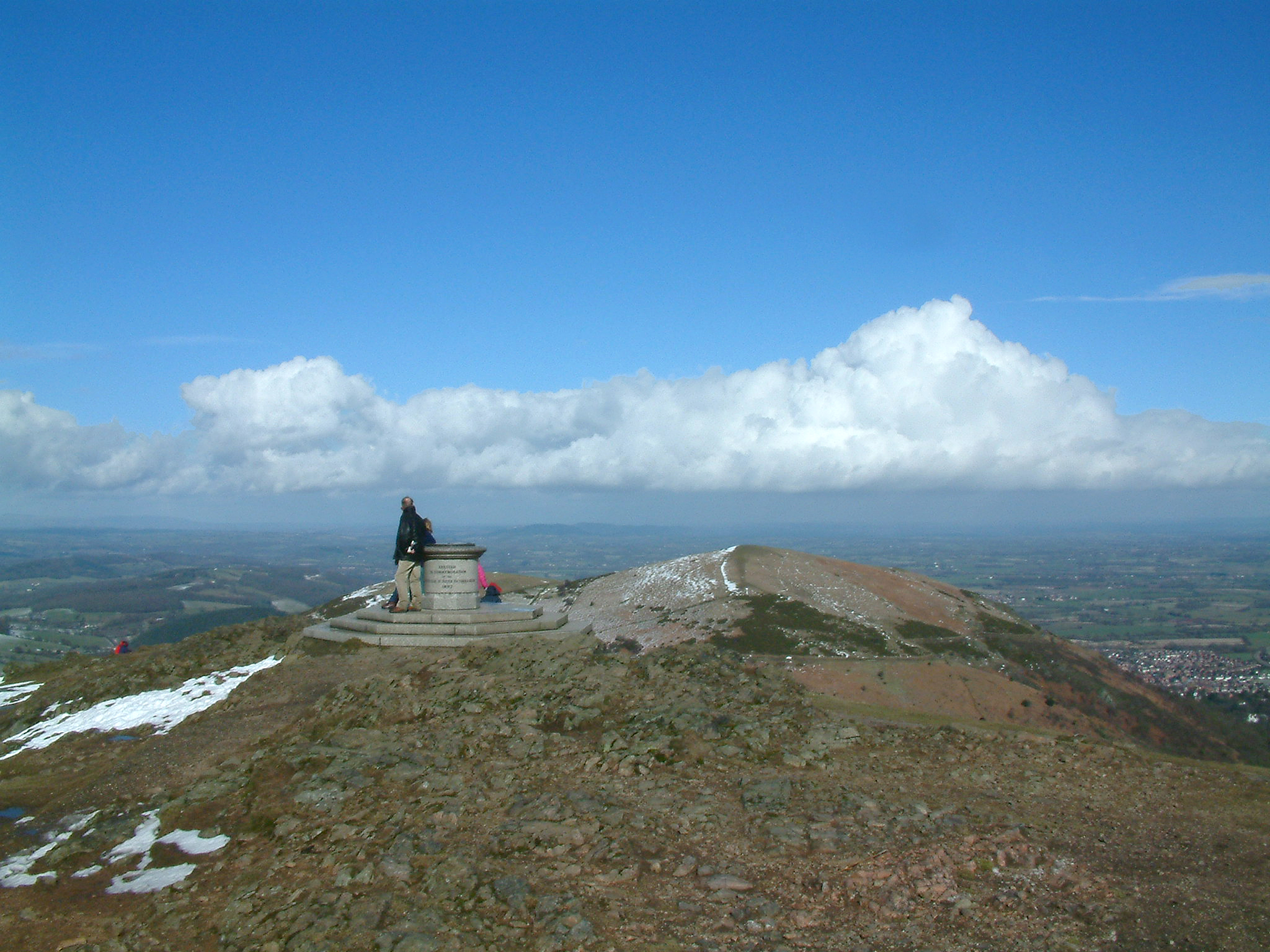
Summit of the Worcestershire Beacon in the Malvern Hills, the county's highest point

The Malvern Hills, which run from the south of the county into Herefordshire, are made up mainly of volcanic igneous rocks and metamorphic rocks, some of which date from more than 1,200 million years ago. They are designated as an Area of Outstanding Natural Beauty (AONB). The Worcestershire Beacon, which at 425 metres (1,394 ft) is the highest point in the county, lies in this range.

The rest of the county consists of undulating hills and farmland stretching either side of the Severn valley. The Severn is the United Kingdom's longest river and flows through Bewdley, Stourport-on-Severn and Worcester. The River Avon flows through the Worcestershire town of Evesham and joins the Severn at Tewkesbury, Gloucestershire.

Several coniferous and deciduous woodlands are located in the north of the county. The Vale of Evesham runs through the south of the county and to its south are the Cotswolds AONB.

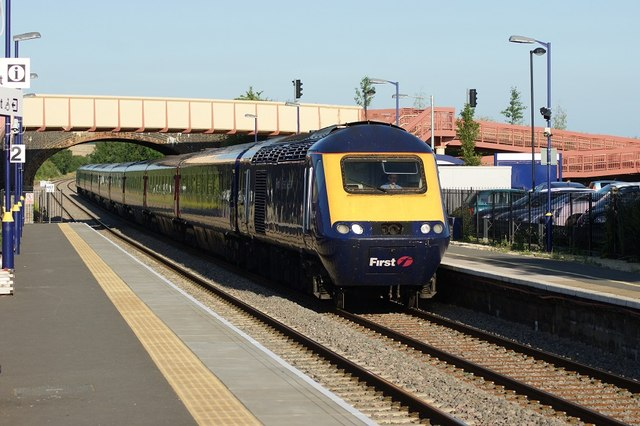
Honeybourne railway station on the Cotswold Line and the potential Honeybourne Line

=== Green belt ===
Worcestershire contains a broad expanse of green belt area, widening to over 16 kilometres (9.9 mi) in places. It is part of the larger belt surrounding the West Midlands county, and first drawn up from the 1950s. All of the county's districts other than Malvern Hills contain some portion of the belt.

== Sport ==
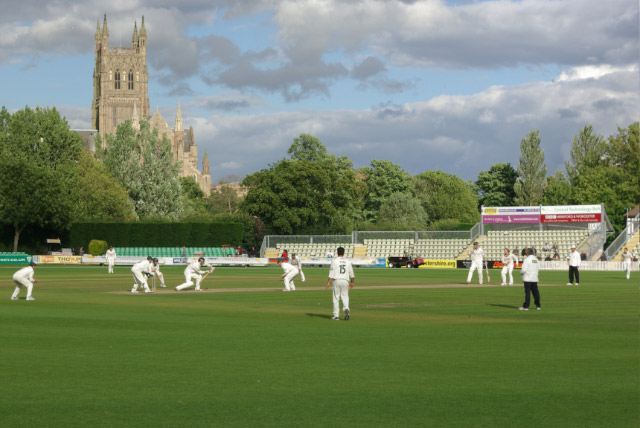
New Road is the home of Worcestershire County Cricket Club, across the River Severn from Worcester Cathedral.

The largest and most successful football club in the county is Kidderminster Harriers. Founded in 1877 as a running club and doubling as a rugby club from 1880, the football club was founded in 1886. In 1987, the club won the FA Trophy for the first time, and seven years later reached the fifth round of the FA Cup, also winning the GM Vauxhall Conference title in 1994 but being denied Football League status as their Aggborough Stadium did not meet capacity requirements. However, when the club next won the Conference title six years later, their stadium had been upgraded and promotion was granted, giving the county its first (and thus far only) Football League members. However, the club's Football League membership was short-lived, as Harriers were relegated back to the Conference in 2005 after just five years in the Football League, and have yet to reclaim their status.

The county is also represented by Alvechurch, Bromsgrove Sporting, Redditch United and Worcester City of the Southern Premier League.

The county is home to Worcestershire County Cricket Club, traditionally the first stop on any touring national side's schedule in England. Formed officially in 1865, the Club initially played in Boughton Park, before moving to its current New Road ground, which today can host 5,500 spectators, in 1895. The club has won five County Championships in its history, most recently in 1989.

Worcester Rugby Football Club, the Worcester Warriors, are the county's largest and most successful Rugby Union team, having been promoted to the Premiership in 2004. The Warriors were relegated to the RFU Championship in 2010 but rebounded back to the Premiership in 2011. Worcester Warriors play at the Sixways Stadium on the outskirts of Worcester, holding over 12,000 spectators, thus making it the largest stadium in the county. Sixways has hosted the final of the LV Cup on three occasions.

== Culture ==
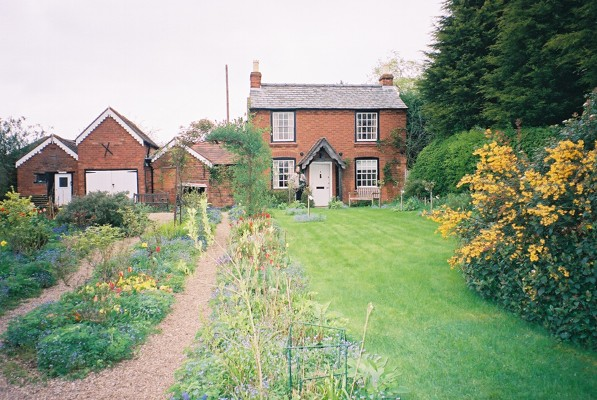
Classical composer Sir Edward Elgar was born in this house in Broadheath, Worcestershire, currently used as the Elgar Birthplace Museum.

The village of Broadheath, about 6.2 miles (10 km) northwest of the city of Worcester, is the birthplace of the composer Edward Elgar.

It is claimed that the county was the inspiration for the Shire, a region of J. R. R. Tolkien's fictional Middle-earth, described in The Hobbit and The Lord of the Rings. Tolkien was thought to have named Bilbo Baggins' house "Bag End" after his Aunt Jane's Worcestershire farm. Tolkien wrote of Worcestershire, "Any corner of that county (however fair or squalid) is in an indefinable way 'home' to me, as no other part of the world is."

Worcestershire is one of the three counties associated with the Border Morris style of English folk dancing. Worcestershire Monkey is a popular Border Morris dance; although normally performed as a group of eight, it is sometimes danced en masse with multiple Border Morris sides performing the dance together.

Worcestershire appeared as one of the main settings in the DreamWorks Animation animated film Shrek the Third. The director Chris Miller said they chose Worcestershire because it is always being mispronounced. "It just made us laugh. Plus we love the sauce, it's hugely popular in the States." The film makes multiple references to the real Worcestershire in the film, even commenting on the famous Worcestershire sauce.

== Media ==
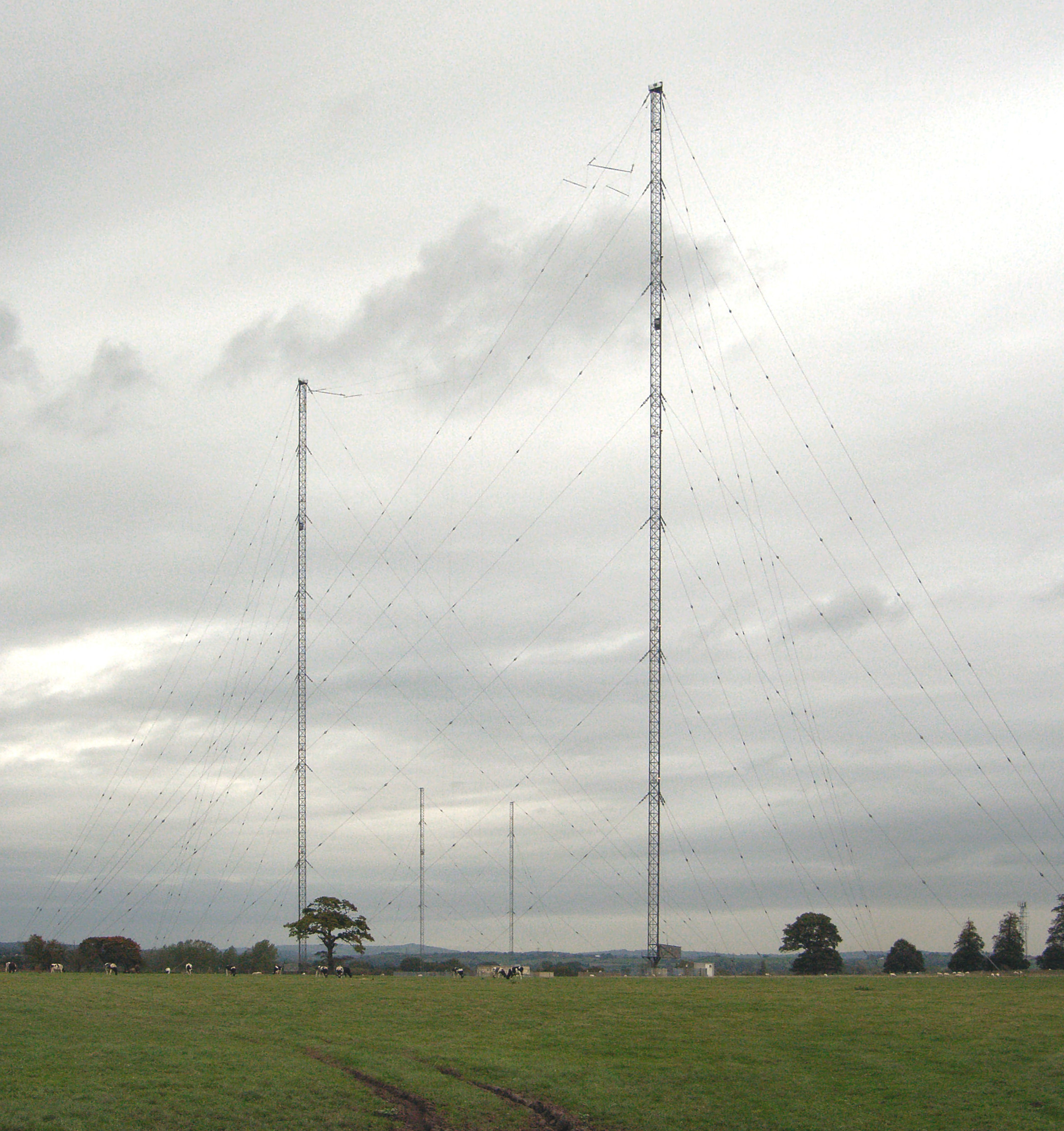
Masts at the Droitwich transmitting station

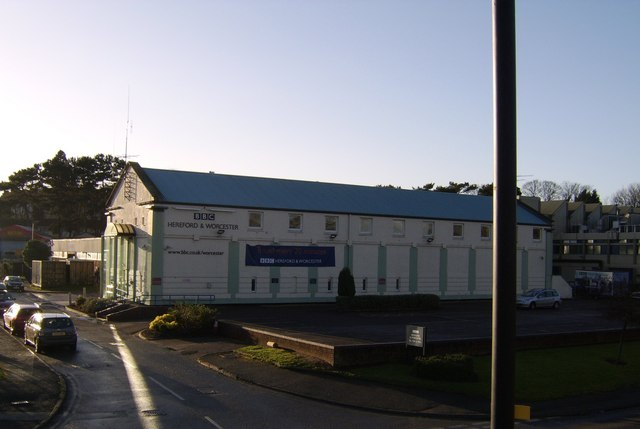
The Worcester offices of BBC Hereford & Worcester

Worcestershire has a long history in radio broadcasting. The county is home to the Droitwich Transmitting Station near Wychbold, currently broadcasting BBC Radio 5 Live and commercial radio services - Absolute Radio and Talksport on Medium Wave/AM and BBC Radio 4 on Long Wave. The site is the location of the British Broadcasting Corporation's most powerful long-wave transmitter, which during World War II, coded messages read during normal programme broadcasts, were received by the French Resistance. Lying close to the county's north western border is the Woofferton transmitting station, which was used during the Cold War to broadcast the Voice of America's Short Wave transmissions into the Eastern Bloc countries of Europe. These sets of transmitters are still in use today.

In 1939, the BBC bought the historic Wood Norton site near Evesham, and equipped the premises with a dozen temporary studios. These were to be used in the event of an evacuation of the BBC's operations in London and other urban areas. By 1940; Wood Norton was one of the largest broadcasting centres in Europe with an average output of 1,300 radio programmes a week. The BBC Monitoring service were also based at Wood Norton, where linguists, many of them foreign nationals, were hired to listen in to broadcasts from Europe until they were relocated to Caversham Park in early 1943. The move was made to release space at Wood Norton so that it could become the BBC's main broadcasting centre, should London have to be evacuated because of the threat from Nazi Germany's V-weapons. The site was also prepared for use during the Cold War, as an emergency broadcast centre. The site is still in use for the BBC's engineering and technical training.

=== Television ===
The county's television news is covered by BBC West Midlands and ITV Central from its studios in Birmingham. Television signals are received from either the Ridge Hill or Sutton Coldfield TV transmitters.

=== Radio ===
BBC Hereford & Worcester and Hits Radio Herefordshire & Worcestershire broadcast to both Herefordshire and Worcestershire on analogue and digital radio platforms, whilst Greatest Hits Radio Midlands broadcasts to Kidderminster, Stourport-on-Severn, Bewdley and Droitwich. A community radio station - Radio Wyvern, is licensed to serve the Worcester area. Meanwhile, Capital Mid-Counties, Sunshine Radio and Like Radio, broadcast to the county on VHF/FM and/or DAB Digital Radio. Historically; West Midlands-based radio stations such as BBC Radio WM, Hits Radio Birmingham and Beacon Radio have considered parts of Worcestershire as their broadcast areas. However what were known as Wyvern, Beacon, BRMB along with Mercia are now known collectively as 'Hits Radio' and under the same Bauer Radio ownership. Other regional stations, such as Heart West Midlands and Smooth West Midlands also cover the county.

In 2007 the Office of Communications (Ofcom) awarded a DAB Digital Radio multiplex licence for Herefordshire & Worcestershire to MuxCo Ltd. MuxCo proposed new stations and a digital radio platform for Wyvern FM, Sunshine Radio and BBC Hereford & Worcester, who were initially licensed to broadcast on VHF/FM and/or AM. MuxCo eventually launched in December 2013 following changes in legislation through the Digital Economy Act 2010, and utilises existing transmitter locations at Great Malvern, Ridge Hill and Bromsgrove. The multiplex continues to uses the same transmission sites, albeit with an additional transmitter at Kidderminster and broadcasts a combination of local and national services. In 2008, MXR, who owned and operated the West Midlands regional DAB multiplex licence, improved coverage of DAB Digital Radio across other parts of the county to include Worcester and Malvern. This regional multiplex closed on 27 August 2013, partially replaced by CE Digital's Birmingham DAB Multiplex, who opened new transmitters at Lickey Hills and Headless Cross. Ofcom has earmarked two potential 'Small Scale DAB' digital radio multiplexes within Worcestershire - one at Worcester, and the other within Bromsgrove, Kidderminster and Redditch. The legal framework for the potential new multiplexes come under 'The Small-Scale Radio Multiplex and Community Digital Radio Order 2019'.

== Economy ==
This is a chart of trend of regional gross value added of Worcestershire at current basic prices published (pp. 240–253) by Office for National Statistics with figures in millions of British Pounds Sterling.

Year	Regional Gross Value Added	Agriculture	Industry	Services
1995	5,047	225	1,623	3,200
2000	6,679	159	2,002	4,518
2003	7,514	182	1,952	5,380

=== Industry and agriculture ===
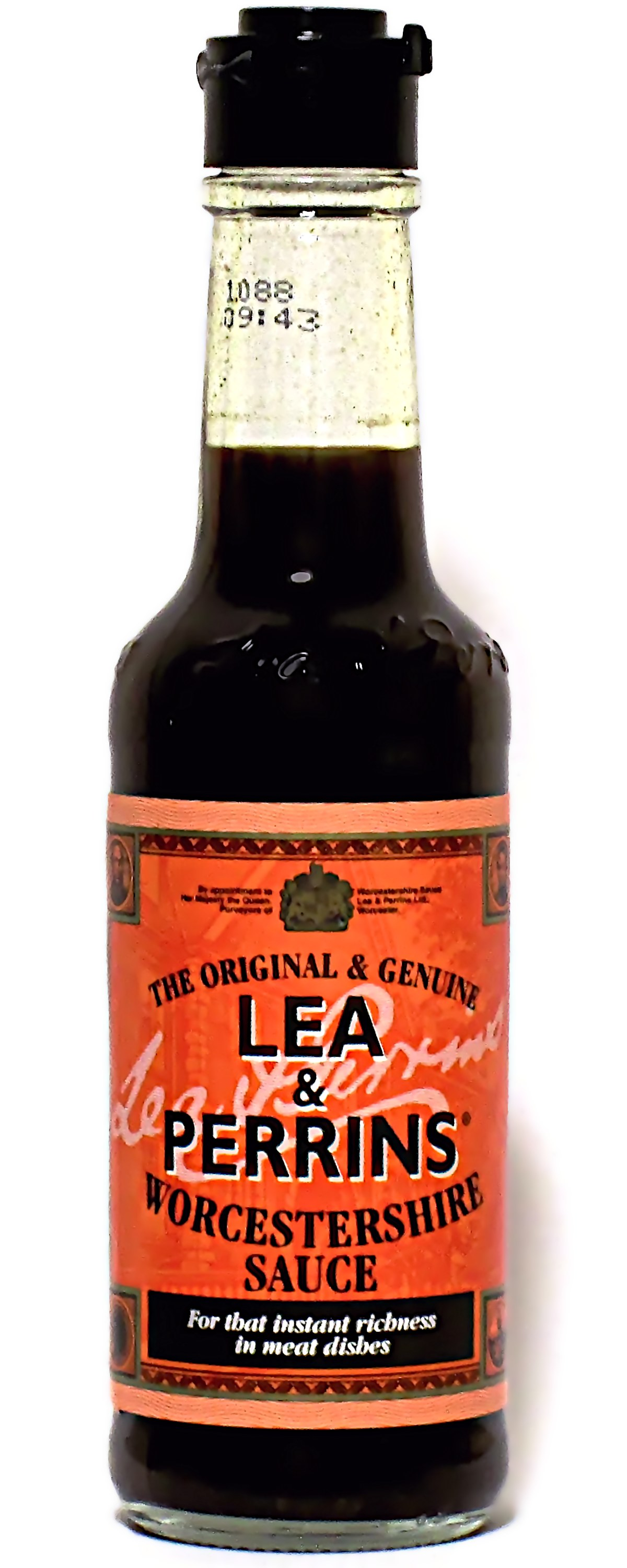
Lea & Perrins Worcestershire sauce – the invention of two Worcester chemists

Fruit farming and the cultivation of hops were traditional agricultural activities in much of the county. During the latter half of the 20th century, this has largely declined with the exception southern area of the county around the Vale of Evesham, where orchards are still worked on a commercial scale. Worcester City's coat of arms includes three black pears, representing a now rare local pear variety, the Worcester Black Pear. The county's coat of arms follows this theme, having a pear tree with black pears. The apple variety known as Worcester Pearmain originates from Worcestershire, and the Pershore plum comes from the small Worcestershire town of that name, and is widely grown in that area. Many of the fruit-growing areas lie along the Vale of Evesham's Blosson Trail, initially established as a tourist route in 1983 and now 55 miles (89 km) in length.

Worcestershire is also famous for a number of its non-agricultural products. The original Worcestershire sauce, a savoury condiment made by Lea & Perrins, is made in Worcester, and the now-closed Royal Porcelain works was based in the city. The town of Malvern is the home of the Morgan traditional sports car.

== Education ==
Worcestershire has a comprehensive school system with over thirty-five independent schools including the RGS Worcester, The King's School, Worcester, Malvern St James and Malvern College. State schools in Worcester, the Wyre Forest District, and the Malvern Hills District are two-tier primary schools and secondary schools whilst Redditch and Bromsgrove have a three-tier system of first, middle and high schools. Several schools in the county provide Sixth-form education including two in the city of Worcester. Several vocational colleges provide GCSE and A-level courses and adult education, such as South Worcestershire College, and an agricultural campus of Warwickshire College in Pershore. There is also the University of Worcester, which is located in the city itself and is home to the National Pollen and Aerobiology Research Unit and five other national research centres.

== Towns and villages ==
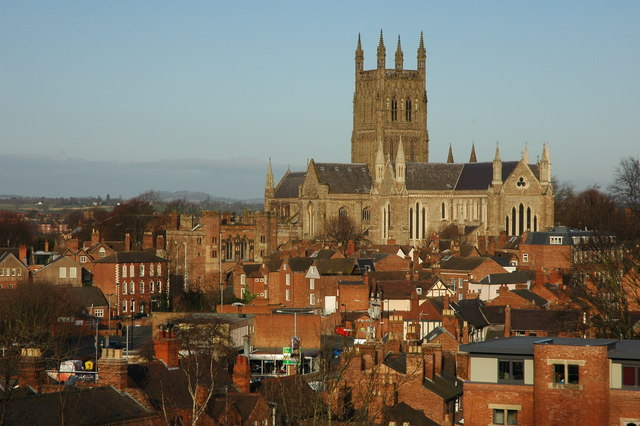
Due to its cathedral (pictured), the county town of Worcester is the only settlement in the county with city status.

The county town and only city is Worcester. The other major settlements are Kidderminster, Bromsgrove and Redditch. There are also several market towns: Malvern, Bewdley, Evesham, Droitwich Spa, Pershore, Tenbury Wells, Stourport-on-Severn and Upton-upon-Severn. The village of Hartlebury housed the Bishop of Worcester from the 13th century until 2007.

== Places of interest ==
Key
	Abbey/Priory/Cathedral
Accessible open space	Accessible open space
	Amusement/Theme Park
	Castle
Country Park	Country Park
	English Heritage
	Forestry Commission
Heritage railway	Heritage railway
Historic house	Historic House
Places of Worship	Places of Worship
Museum (free) Museum	Museum (free/not free)
National Trust	National Trust
	Theatre
	Zoo

- Almonry Museum - Evesham
- Avoncroft Museum of Historic Buildings
- Bewdley – riverside historic Tudor town
- Broadway – a picturesque Cotswold village
- Croome Court
- Elgar Birthplace Museum
- Evesham Bell Tower
- Forge Mill Needle Museum at Redditch, the only remaining working needle mill in the world.
- Great Malvern Priory
- Greyfriars' House and Garden
- Hanbury Hall
- Hartlebury Castle
- Harvington Hall
- Kemerton Court
- Malvern Hills – Area of Outstanding Natural Beauty
- Middle Littleton Tithe Barn – a restored 13th-century tithe barn
- Morgan Cars – visitors centre and museum
- Pershore Abbey
- River Severn at Worcester and Bewdley, River Avon at Pershore or Evesham
- River Teme and valley
- Severn Valley Railway at Kidderminster.
- Tenbury Wells with its unique Pump Rooms.
- The Commandery
- The Fleece Inn – an ancient public house, now owned by the National Trust
- The Hive, Worcester – the new University and public library (opened in 2012)
- Wadborough
- Walton Hill and the Clent Hills
- West Midlands Safari Park near Bewdley.
- Witley Court at Great Witley – a burnt-out shell of a large English stately home, famous for its gigantic fountain, now restored to working order. Currently run by English Heritage.
- Worcester and Birmingham Canal
- Worcester Cathedral
- Worcestershire County Museum
- Worcester City Art Gallery & Museum
- Worcester Porcelain Museum

== Local groups ==
- Worcestershire Wildlife Trust
- 29th Regiment of Foot
- West Midland Bird Club

== See also ==
- Custos Rotulorum of Worcestershire - List of Keepers of the Rolls
- Healthcare in Worcestershire
- High Sheriff of Worcestershire
- List of English and Welsh endowed schools (19th century)#Worcestershire
- Lord Lieutenant of Worcestershire
- Worcestershire (UK Parliament constituency) - Historical list of MPs for Worcestershire constituency

== Sources ==
- "Spa Towns: Malvern" 27 October, retrieved 24 June 2006
- Brookes, Alan; Pevsner, Nikolaus (2007), Worcestershire, The Buildings of England (Revised ed.), London: Yale University Press, ISBN 9780300112986, OL 10319229M
- MacDonald, Alec (1969) [1943], Worcestershire in English History (Reprint ed.), London: SR Publishers, ISBN 978-0854095759
- Mason, Emma (1979). "Magnates, curiales, and the Wheel of Fortune". In Brown, Reginald Allen (ed.). Proceedings of the Battle Conference on Anglo-Norman Studies: 1979. Vol. II. The Boydell Press.
- Mundill, Robin R (2002), England's Jewish Solution: Experiment and Expulsion, 1262-1290, Cambridge University Press, ISBN 978-0-521-52026-3
- Russell, O; Daffern, N; Hancox, E; Nash, A (2018), "Putting the Palaeolithic into Worcestershire's HER: An evidence base for development management", Internet Archaeology, 47 (47), doi:10.11141/ia.47.3
- Willis-Bund, J.W.; Page, William, eds. (1924), "The city of Worcester: Introduction and borough", A History of the County of Worcester: Volume 4, London, pp. 376–390 – via British History Online
