= Worcestershire County Council =

Local government body in England

Type
- Type: Non-metropolitan county

History
- Succeeded by: North Worcestershire; South Worcestershire

Leadership
- Chair: Paul Bennett, Liberal Democrats since 14 May 2026
- Leader: Matt Jenkins, Green since 14 May 2026
- Chief Executive: Paul Robinson since March 2018

Structure
- Seats: 57 councillors
- Graph of the party split among 57 seats.
- Political groups: Administration (30) Conservative (13) Liberal Democrats (8) Green (7) Independent (2) Other parties (27) Reform UK (21) Labour (2) Independent (4)
- Length of term: 4 years

Elections
- Voting system: First past the post
- First election: January 1889
- Last election: 1 May 2025

Website
- www.worcestershire.gov.uk

Worcestershire County Council is the county council for the non-metropolitan county of Worcestershire in England. The council is based in Worcester, the county town.

The council has been under no overall control since the 2025 election. Following that election, a Reform UK minority administration ran the council until May 2026, when it was replaced by a coalition of the Conservative Party, Green Party, Liberal Democrats and some of the independent councillors, led by Green Party councillor Matt Jenkins.

The county council was first created in 1889. In 1974 the council was abolished when Worcestershire and neighbouring Herefordshire were merged to form a new county called Hereford and Worcester. In 1998 Worcestershire and Herefordshire became separate counties again, and Worcestershire County Council was re-established.

The county council is due to be abolished in 2029 as part of upcoming structural changes to local government in England.

== History ==
Elected county councils were created in 1889 under the Local Government Act 1888, taking over many administrative functions which had previously been performed by unelected magistrates at the quarter sessions. The boroughs of Worcester and Dudley were considered large enough to provide their own county-level services and so they were made county boroughs, independent from Worcestershire County Council. The county council was elected by and provided services to the rest of the county, which area was termed the administrative county. The 1888 Act also said that any urban sanitary districts which straddled county boundaries were to be placed entirely in the county which had the majority of that district's population, which saw Worcestershire gain the part of Redditch which had been in Warwickshire.

The first elections to the county council were held in January 1889 and it formally came into being on 1 April 1889. On that day it held its first official meeting at Worcester Guildhall. The first chairman was George Hastings, who was the Liberal Unionist Member of Parliament for East Worcestershire.

There were a number of changes to the boundaries of the administrative county over the years. It ceded territory in the north-east to Birmingham on several occasions, and the complicated boundaries in the south with Gloucestershire and Warwickshire were simplified in the 1930s. In 1966 Oldbury was transferred to the new County Borough of Warley, which was ceremonially associated with Worcestershire but outside the administrative county controlled by the county council.

The administrative county of Worcestershire was abolished in 1974. The boroughs of Halesowen and Stourbridge were transferred to the new West Midlands county, and the rest of administrative county merged with Herefordshire and the county borough of Worcester to form a new non-metropolitan county called Hereford and Worcester. Hereford and Worcester County Council therefore took over the old Worcestershire County Council's functions for most of its area.

Hereford and Worcester only existed as a county for 24 years. It was abolished in 1998 as part of the 1990s United Kingdom local government reforms and divided into separate counties of Herefordshire and Worcestershire, with Worcestershire County Council being re-established as the upper-tier local authority for Worcestershire.

In July 2026, the government announced that Worcestershire's county and district councils would be abolished with effect from April 2028, though this was later delayed to 2029. The county will then be split into two unitary authorities called North Worcestershire and South Worcestershire.

== Governance ==
Worcestershire County Council provides county-level services. District-level services are provided by the six district councils:

- Bromsgrove District Council
- Malvern Hills District Council
- Redditch Borough Council
- Worcester City Council
- Wychavon District Council
- Wyre Forest District Council

Much of the county is also covered by civil parishes, which form a third tier of local government.

=== Political control ===
The council has been under no overall control since the 2025 election, with Reform UK being the largest party. They subsequently formed a minority administration after that election.

On 14 May 2026, a multi-party power sharing agreement between the Conservatives, Greens, Liberal Democrats, and Independents ousted the Reform minority leadership with Green Matt Jenkins becoming leader of the council. The national Conservative leadership disagreed with the agreement and suspended their councillors' group leader.

The first elections to the re-established Worcestershire County Council were held in 1997, initially operating as a shadow authority until the new arrangements came into effect on 1 April 1998. Political control of the council since 1998 has been as follows:

Party	Tenure
No overall control	1998–2005
Conservative	2005–2025
No overall control	2025–

=== Leadership ===
The leaders of the council since 1998 have been:

Councillor	Party	From	To
Carol Warren	Labour	1 Apr 1998	2001
George Lord	Conservative	2001	6 Nov 2010
Adrian Hardman	Conservative	18 Nov 2010	14 Jan 2016
Simon Geraghty	Conservative	14 Jan 2016	May 2025
Jo Monk	Reform	22 May 2025	14 May 2026
Matt Jenkins	Green	14 May 2026	

=== Composition ===
Following the 2025 election and subsequent by-elections and changes of allegiance up to August 2026, the composition of the council was:

Party	Seats
Reform	21
Conservative	13
Liberal Democrats	8
Green	7
Labour	2
Independent	6
Total	57

Two of the independent councillors sit with the Green Party as the "Green and Independent Group", which forms part of the council's administration alongside the Conservatives and Liberal Democrats. The other four independent councillors sit together as the "Worcestershire Independent Group".

== Elections ==
Since the last boundary changes in 2005 the council has comprised 57 councillors representing 52 electoral divisions, with each division electing one or two councillors. Elections are held every four years.

== Premises ==
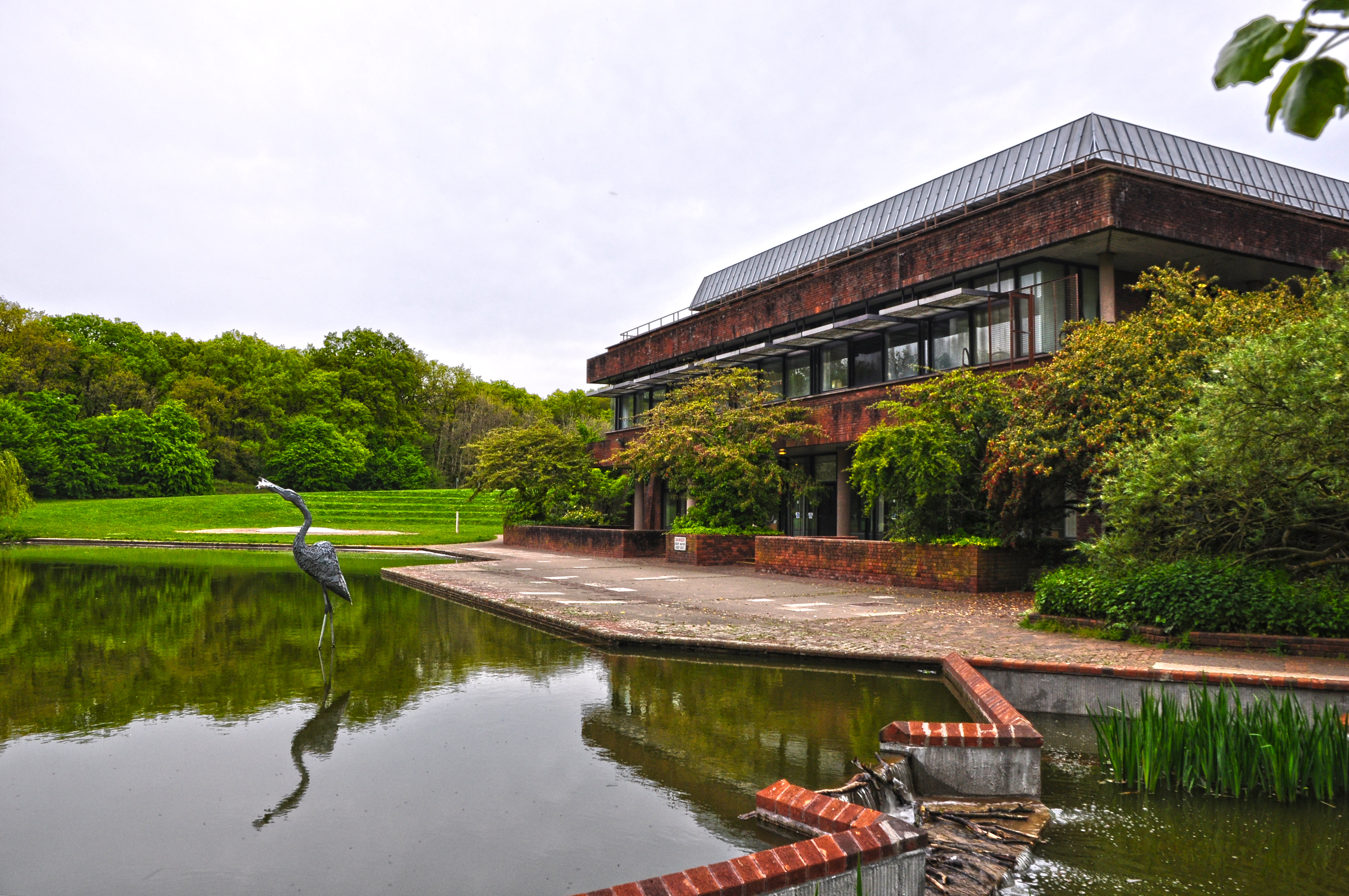
County Hall, Worcester: Completed 1978 for Hereford and Worcester County Council, then served as Worcestershire County Council's headquarters 1998–2024

Since 2024, the council has had its main offices at Wildwood, a modern office building on Wildwood Drive on the outskirts of Worcester. Council meetings and committees are held at various venues around the county, with full council meetings generally held at the Wychavon District Council offices in Pershore.

Until 2024, the council was based at County Hall on Spetchley Road, also on the outskirts of Worcester. County Hall was purpose-built as the headquarters of Hereford and Worcester County Council, and had been completed in 1978. The building transferred to the re-established Worcestershire County Council as part of the 1998 reforms. County Hall closed in June 2024 after significant structural issues were identified with the building.

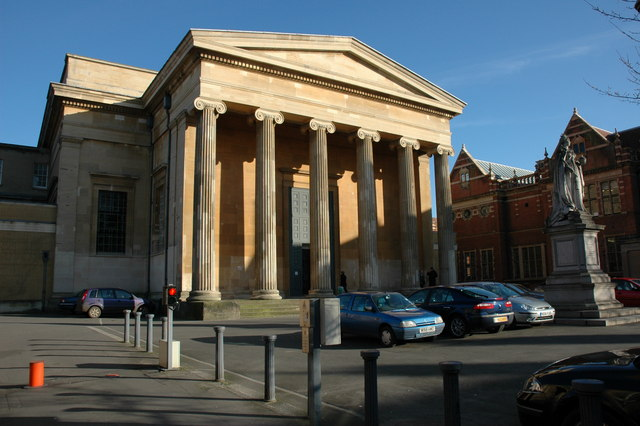
Shire Hall: Meeting place of the first incarnation of the county council

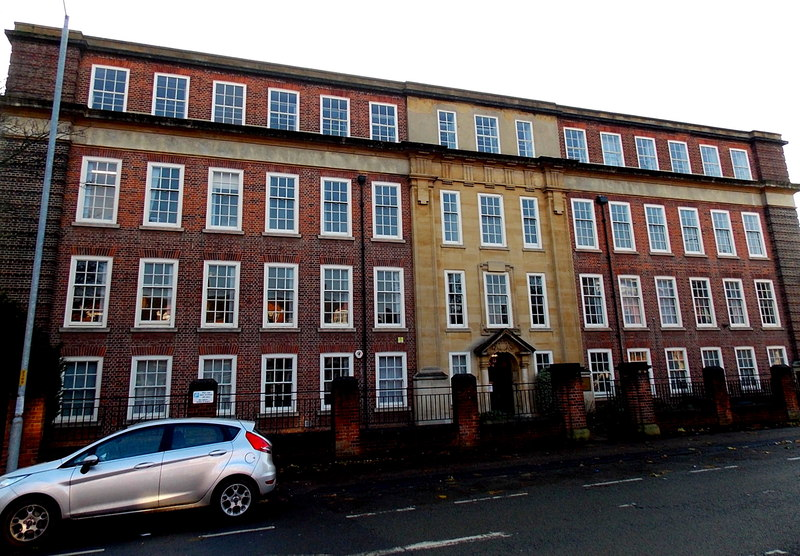
County Buildings, St Mary's Street: County Council's headquarters 1930–1974

Having held its first meeting in 1889 at Worcester Guildhall, the first Worcestershire County Council later established its usual meeting place at Shire Hall, Worcester, a courthouse which had been built in 1835. County Buildings was built alongside Shire Hall in 1930 to house the council's administrative offices. County Buildings and Shire Hall continued to be used by the successor Hereford and Worcester County Council until the new County Hall at Spetchley Road was completed in 1978.

New creation	County council 1889 – 1974	Succeeded by Hereford and Worcester County Council
Preceded by Hereford and Worcester County Council	County council 1998 – present	Current
