= Grade I listed buildings in Worcestershire =

Worcestershire shown within England

There are over 9000 Grade I listed buildings in England. This page is a list of these buildings in the county of Worcestershire, by district.

== Bromsgrove ==
Name	Location	Type	Completed (Note: The date given is the date used by Historic England as significant for the initial building or that of an important part in the structure's description.)	Date designated	Grid ref. (Note: The grid reference is based on the British national grid reference system, sometimes known as OSGB36, used by the Ordnance Survey.) Geo-coordinates	Entry number (Note: The "List Entry Number" is a unique number assigned to each listed building and scheduled monument by Historic England.)	Image
Church of St Leonard	Beoley	Church	12th century	16 November 1967	SP0652069648; 52°19′30″N 1°54′21″W	1167467	Church of St Leonard More images
Hagley Hall	Hagley Park, Hagley	Country House	1754-60	23 April 1952	SO9195980690; 52°25′27″N 2°07′11″W	1296865	Hagley Hall More images
Temple of Theseus about 1/2 mile north of Hagley Hall	Wychbury Hill, Hagley	Temple	1758	23 April 1952	SO9213281351; 52°25′48″N 2°07′02″W	1348599	Temple of Theseus about 1/2 mile north of Hagley Hall More images
Church of St Kenelm	Romsley	Chapel of Ease	12th century	16 November 1967	SO9444480755; 52°25′29″N 2°04′59″W	1100110	Church of St Kenelm More images
Church of St Michael	Stoke Prior	Parish Church	Early 12th century	16 November 1967	SO9493467699; 52°18′27″N 2°04′33″W	1100179	Church of St Michael More images
Church of St John the Baptist	Bromsgrove	Church	12th century	28 April 1952	SO9569770677; 52°20′03″N 2°03′52″W	1100363	Church of St John the Baptist More images
Hewell Grange	Hewell Park, Tutnall and Cobley, Bromsgrove	Country House	1884-1891	16 July 1986	SP0067669010; 52°19′09″N 1°59′29″W	1100160	Hewell Grange More images

== Malvern Hills ==
Name	Location	Type	Completed	Date designated	Grid ref. Geo-coordinates	Entry number	Image
Church of St Peter	Astley	Parish Church	Mid-Late 12th century	29 July 1959	SO7876267619; 52°18′23″N 2°18′46″W	1082676	Church of St Peter More images
Birtsmorton Court	Birtsmorton	Moat	14th century	11 August 1952	SO8006235447; 52°01′02″N 2°17′31″W	1098856	Birtsmorton Court More images
Church of St Gregory	Castlemorton	Church	Early 12th century	25 March 1968	SO7948937251; 52°02′00″N 2°18′01″W	1156879	Church of St Gregory More images
Church of St Mary Magdalene	Croome D'abitot	Church	1758	25 March 1968	SO8864645034; 52°06′13″N 2°10′02″W	1082581	Church of St Mary Magdalene More images
Croome Court	Croome D'abitot	Country House	1751-2	11 August 1952	SO8849444596; 52°05′58″N 2°10′10″W	1349526	Croome Court More images
Island Temple, Croome Park	Croome D'abitot	Garden Temple	c. 1800	25 March 1968	SO8789944648; 52°06′00″N 2°10′41″W	1302560	Island Temple, Croome Park More images
London (or Pershore) Lodge and Gates	Croome D'abitot	Gate	c. 1760	11 August 1952	SO8886344864; 52°06′07″N 2°09′50″W	1082579	London (or Pershore) Lodge and Gates More images
Temple Greenhouse, Croome Park	Croome D'abitot	Temple	c. 1760	25 March 1968	SO8814144996; 52°06′11″N 2°10′28″W	1082575	Temple Greenhouse, Croome Park More images
The Panorama Tower, Croome Park	Croome D'abitot	Garden Temple	c. 1800	11 August 1952	SO8643144502; 52°05′55″N 2°11′58″W	1082582	The Panorama Tower, Croome Park More images
The Rotunda and Shrubbery, Croome Park	Croome D'abitot	Garden Temple	c. 1760	11 August 1952	SO8886244549; 52°05′57″N 2°09′50″W	1082574	The Rotunda and Shrubbery, Croome Park More images
Church of St Peter and St Paul	Eastham	Parish Church	12th century	18 April 1966	SO6569768729; 52°18′56″N 2°30′17″W	1350032	Church of St Peter and St Paul More images
Saint Michael and All Angels Church	Great Witley	Parish Church	1735	29 July 1959	SO7695364977; 52°16′57″N 2°20′21″W	1082655	Saint Michael and All Angels Church More images
Perseus and Andromeda Fountain	Witley Court, Great Witley	Statue	c. 1860	12 November 1951	SO7695464826; 52°16′52″N 2°20′21″W	1349487	Perseus and Andromeda Fountain More images
Witley Court and Link to Church of St Michael	Witley Park, Great Witley	Country House	17th century	12 November 1951	SO7698364937; 52°16′56″N 2°20′20″W	1082656	Witley Court and Link to Church of St Michael More images
Church of St Martin	Holt	Parish Church	Mid 12th century	29 July 1959	SO8295962556; 52°15′39″N 2°15′04″W	1349337	Church of St Martin More images
Holt Castle	Holt	Fortified House	14th century	12 November 1951	SO8306162568; 52°15′40″N 2°14′59″W	1082922	Holt Castle More images
Church of St Mary	Kempsey	Church	12th century	25 March 1968	SO8482449061; 52°08′23″N 2°13′23″W	1157621	Church of St Mary More images
Church of St Michael	Knighton on Teme	Parish Church	12th century	18 April 1966	SO6333669913; 52°19′34″N 2°32′22″W	1167609	Church of St Michael More images
Church of St Eadburga	Leigh	Church	12th century	29 July 1959	SO7842053456; 52°10′44″N 2°19′01″W	1098765	Church of St Eadburga More images
Cruck Barn, Leigh Court	Leigh, Malvern Hills	Cruck Barn	14th century	9 February 1988	SO7834753505; 52°10′46″N 2°19′05″W	1349245	Cruck Barn, Leigh Court More images
Church of St Giles	Little Malvern	Church	Norman	25 March 1968	SO7703040381; 52°03′41″N 2°20′11″W	1349255	Church of St Giles More images
Eastington Hall and Barn to North West	Longdon	Jettied House	Late 13th century	11 August 1952	SO8308938154; 52°02′29″N 2°14′53″W	1238530	Eastington Hall and Barn to North West More images
Madresfield Court, Including Bridge, Retaining Wall and North Service Court	Madresfield	Country House	16th century	25 March 1968	SO8087347463; 52°07′31″N 2°16′51″W	1098779	Madresfield Court, Including Bridge, Retaining Wall and North Service Court More images
Priory Church of St Mary and St Michael	Malvern	Church	c. 1085	30 November 1949	SO7759545851; 52°06′38″N 2°19′43″W	1082794	Priory Church of St Mary and St Michael More images
Church of St John the Baptist	Mamble	Parish Church	c. 1200	18 April 1966	SO6884471615; 52°20′30″N 2°27′31″W	1081406	Church of St John the Baptist More images
Church of St Peter	Martley	Parish Church	12th century	29 July 1959	SO7563559814; 52°14′10″N 2°21′30″W	1082960	Church of St Peter More images
The Old Hall	Martley	House	14th century	12 November 1951	SO7569059872; 52°14′11″N 2°21′27″W	1349355	Upload Photo
Church of St Leonard	Newland	Church	1862	25 March 1968	SO7959348491; 52°08′04″N 2°17′58″W	1098739	Church of St Leonard More images
Pendock Church	Pendock	Church	Mid 12th century	25 March 1968	SO8170733704; 52°00′05″N 2°16′04″W	1098789	Pendock Church More images
Church of St Peter and St Lawrence	Powick	Church	12th century	25 March 1968	SO8344651525; 52°09′42″N 2°14′36″W	1166920	Church of St Peter and St Lawrence More images
Church of St Mary	Ripple	Church	Late 12th century to 13th century	25 March 1968	SO8761637737; 52°02′16″N 2°10′55″W	1349090	Church of St Mary More images
Church of St Andrew	Shelsley Walsh	Parish Church	12th century	29 July 1959	SO7215862966; 52°15′51″N 2°24′34″W	1156637	Church of St Andrew More images
Church of St Mary	Shrawley	Parish Church	Early-Mid 12th century	27 November 1984	SO8060464791; 52°16′51″N 2°17′09″W	1082650	Church of St Mary More images
The White House	Suckley	Farmhouse	Early 18th century	12 November 1951	SO7210452780; 52°10′21″N 2°24′34″W	1349724	The White House More images

== Redditch ==
Name	Location	Type	Completed	Date designated	Grid ref. Geo-coordinates	Entry number	Image
Norgrove Court	Feckenham	Farmhouse	c. 1823	10 April 1954	SP0071965377; 52°17′12″N 1°59′27″W	1167093	Norgrove Court More images

== Worcester ==
Name	Location	Type	Completed	Date designated	Grid ref. Geo-coordinates	Entry number	Image
Church of St Nicholas	Warndon, City of Worcester	Church	12th century	14 March 1969	SO8878256887; 52°12′36″N 2°09′56″W	1301320	Church of St Nicholas More images
Berkeley's Hospital: Almshouses with Gate lodges, Piers and Gates	Worcester	Gate Lodge	1672-1703	22 May 1954	SO849551; 52°11′38″N 2°13′19″W	1390200	Berkeley's Hospital: Almshouses with Gate lodges, Piers and Gates More images
Berkeley's Hospital: Chapel	Worcester	Almshouse	1703	22 May 1954	SO8490255117; 52°11′39″N 2°13′20″W	1390199	Berkeley's Hospital: Chapel More images
Cathedral Church of Christ and St Mary	Worcester	Cathedral	1084	22 May 1954	SO8500254520; 52°11′19″N 2°13′15″W	1389728	Cathedral Church of Christ and St Mary More images
Cathedral of St Mary: Cloister Range, Chapter House and Undercroft with Refectory	Worcester	Chapter House	c1100-1110	22 May 1954	SO8499754484; 52°11′18″N 2°13′15″W	1389729	Cathedral of St Mary: Cloister Range, Chapter House and Undercroft with Refectory More images
Church of St Swithun and Attached Railings	Worcester	Church	Made redundant	22 May 1954	SO8504354949; 52°11′33″N 2°13′13″W	1063801	Church of St Swithun and Attached Railings More images
Edgar Tower	Worcester	Gatehouse	Construction started c1300-35	22 May 1954	SO8507554445; 52°11′17″N 2°13′11″W	1063829	Edgar Tower More images
Guildhall	Worcester	Assembly Rooms	c1721-3	22 May 1954	SO8500354790; 52°11′28″N 2°13′15″W	1389921	Guildhall More images
King's School Hall (College Hall)	Worcester	School	C20	22 May 1954	SO8497854463; 52°11′18″N 2°13′16″W	1063830	King's School Hall (College Hall) More images
Powick Old Bridge	Worcester	Bridge	Late Mediaeval	25 March 1968	SO8351152469; 52°10′13″N 2°14′33″W	1349275	Powick Old Bridge More images
Powick Old Bridge (that Part Within the City of Worcester)	Lower Wick, Worcester	Bridge	16th century	22 May 1954	SO8352052490; 52°10′14″N 2°14′33″W	1390030	Powick Old Bridge (that Part Within the City of Worcester) More images
The Commandery	Worcester	House	1540	22 May 1954	SO8527654392; 52°11′15″N 2°13′00″W	1390176	The Commandery More images
The Greyfriars	Worcester	Apartment	1870s	22 May 1954	SO8514654714; 52°11′26″N 2°13′07″W	1389859	The Greyfriars More images
The Old Palace	Worcester	Bishops Palace	c1200-1235	22 May 1954	SO8491354629; 52°11′23″N 2°13′20″W	1389763	The Old Palace More images
Wrought Iron Gates and Railings to Forecourt at Guildhall	Worcester	Gate	1723	5 April 1971	SO8501654793; 52°11′28″N 2°13′14″W	1389922	Wrought Iron Gates and Railings to Forecourt at Guildhall More images

== Wychavon ==
Name	Location	Type	Completed	Date designated	Grid ref. Geo-coordinates	Entry number	Image
Church of St Peter	Abbots Morton	Parish Church	12th century	30 July 1959	SP0267454973; 52°11′35″N 1°57′44″W	1350229	Church of St Peter More images
Church of St Mary	Aston Somerville	Church	13th century	29 July 1987	SP0474237868; 52°02′21″N 1°55′56″W	1214230	Church of St Mary More images
Church of St John the Baptist	Beckford	Parish Church	c. 1130	30 July 1959	SO9761235841; 52°01′16″N 2°02′10″W	1167374	Church of St John the Baptist More images
Church of St Giles	Bredon	Church	Norman	11 February 1965	SO9200836978; 52°01′52″N 2°07′04″W	1117088	Church of St Giles More images
Tithe Barn	Bredon	Tithe Barn	Late 14th century	11 February 1965	SO9184036954; 52°01′51″N 2°07′13″W	1319631	Tithe Barn More images
Church of St Leonard	Bretforton	Parish Church	Late 12th century	30 July 1959	SP0930143814; 52°05′33″N 1°51′56″W	1157784	Church of St Leonard More images
Church of St Eadburgha	Broadway	Church	Late 12th century	30 July 1959	SP0970536258; 52°01′29″N 1°51′36″W	1287966	Church of St Eadburgha More images
Church of St Michael	Cropthorne	Cross	C9	11 February 1965	SP0001645131; 52°06′16″N 2°00′04″W	1116923	Church of St Michael More images
Church of St Nicholas	Dormston	Bell Tower	Mid 15th century	11 February 1965	SO9872357574; 52°12′59″N 2°01′12″W	1116851	Church of St Nicholas More images
Church of St Andrew	Droitwich Spa	Parish Church	C13-C14	24 October 1951	SO8996063363; 52°16′06″N 2°08′55″W	1167974	Church of St Andrew More images
Church of St Peter	Droitwich Spa	Parish Church	Norman	24 October 1951	SO9022562495; 52°15′38″N 2°08′41″W	1296639	Church of St Peter More images
Church of St Mary	Elmley Castle	Church	Norman	11 February 1965	SO9819241008; 52°04′03″N 2°01′40″W	1116640	Church of St Mary More images
Abbot Reginald's Gateway	Evesham	Gate	c. 1120	7 May 1952	SP0371143721; 52°05′31″N 1°56′50″W	1081349	Abbot Reginald's Gateway More images
Church of All Saints	Evesham	Church	Norman	7 May 1952	SP0373243699; 52°05′30″N 1°56′49″W	1081351	Church of All Saints More images
Gate and Railings of Number 53	Evesham	Gate	Early 18th century	24 June 1977	SP0360143665; 52°05′29″N 1°56′56″W	1081359	Upload Photo
Numbers 53 and 54 Incorporating Remains of Abbey Gate (Abbey Gate House)	Evesham	Abbey	Early 14th century	7 May 1952	SP0360443647; 52°05′28″N 1°56′56″W	1156720	Upload Photo
Round House (National Westminster Bank)	Evesham	House	1964-65	7 May 1952	SP0372443791; 52°05′33″N 1°56′49″W	1156077	Round House (National Westminster Bank) More images
The Almonry	Evesham	Abbey	15th century or earlier	7 May 1952	SP0357143648; 52°05′28″N 1°56′57″W	1302722	The Almonry More images
Evesham Abbey Bell Tower	Evesham	Bell Tower	Early 16th century	7 May 1952	SP0375043662; 52°05′29″N 1°56′48″W	1081353	Evesham Abbey Bell Tower More images
Church of St John the Baptist	Fladbury	Parish Church	12th century	11 February 1965	SO9962046276; 52°06′53″N 2°00′25″W	1039147	Church of St John the Baptist More images
Church of St Mary	Hampton Lovett	Parish Church	Early 12th century	14 March 1969	SO8890465595; 52°17′18″N 2°09′51″W	1215375	Church of St Mary More images
Church of St Mary the Virgin	Hanbury	Parish Church	13th century	14 March 1969	SO9542564393; 52°16′40″N 2°04′07″W	1350133	Church of St Mary the Virgin More images
Hanbury Hall	Hanbury	Country House	1701	29 December 1952	SO9441863741; 52°16′18″N 2°05′00″W	1350164	Hanbury Hall More images
Mere Hall	Broughton Green, Hanbury	Country House	c. 1560	29 December 1952	SO9520261847; 52°15′17″N 2°04′18″W	1301918	Mere Hall More images
Hartlebury Castle	Hartlebury	Bishops Palace	Mid 13th century	29 December 1952	SO8361171216; 52°20′20″N 2°14′31″W	1215570	Hartlebury Castle More images
Church of St James	Harvington	Parish Church	12th century	30 July 1959	SP0571948827; 52°08′16″N 1°55′04″W	1350000	Church of St James More images
Church of St Mary Magdalene	Himbleton	Parish Church	12th century	14 March 1969	SO9466358757; 52°13′37″N 2°04′46″W	1081205	Church of St Mary Magdalene More images
Church of St Ecgwin	Honeybourne	Parish Church	1295	30 July 1959	SP1199544051; 52°05′41″N 1°49′35″W	1081550	Church of St Ecgwin More images
Church of St James	Huddington	Parish Church	12th century	14 March 1969	SO9428757252; 52°12′48″N 2°05′06″W	1350155	Church of St James More images
Huddington Court	Huddington	Moat	Early 16th century	29 December 1952	SO9424957294; 52°12′50″N 2°05′08″W	1081215	Huddington Court More images
Church of St Peter	Inkberrow	Parish Church	12th century	30 July 1959	SP0161357205; 52°12′47″N 1°58′40″W	1350279	Church of St Peter More images
The Tithe Barn	Middle Littleton, North and Middle Littleton	Farm Building	Early 14th century	30 July 1959	SP0798747069; 52°07′19″N 1°53′05″W	1350092	The Tithe Barn More images
Ombersley Court	Ombersley	Country House	1724-32	25 December 1952	SO8418963389; 52°16′06″N 2°13′59″W	1172877	Ombersley Court More images
Church of St Faith	Overbury	Parish Church	12th century	30 July 1959	SO9569837423; 52°02′07″N 2°03′51″W	1167601	Church of St Faith More images
Church of St Peter	Pebworth	Church	14th century	30 July 1959	SP1286046898; 52°07′13″N 1°48′49″W	1081297	Church of St Peter More images
Abbey Church of Holy Cross with Saint Edburgha	Pershore	Abbey	C11-C13	11 February 1965	SO9478545789; 52°06′37″N 2°04′39″W	1387027	Abbey Church of Holy Cross with Saint Edburgha More images
Perrott House	Pershore	House	c. 1760	11 February 1965	SO9504645658; 52°06′33″N 2°04′26″W	1386920	Perrott House More images
Church of St Peter	Pirton	Parish Church	12th century	11 February 1965	SO8854346831; 52°07′11″N 2°10′07″W	1258259	Church of St Peter More images
Church of St Peter	Rous Lench	Parish Church	12th century	30 July 1959	SP0146953286; 52°10′40″N 1°58′48″W	1081652	Church of St Peter More images
Church of St John the Baptist	Strensham	Parish Church	14th century	11 February 1965	SO9108140629; 52°03′50″N 2°07′53″W	1273274	Church of St John the Baptist More images
Westwood House	Westwood Park, Westwood	Apartment	Mid C20	29 December 1952	SO8756063967; 52°16′25″N 2°11′01″W	1173950	Westwood House More images
Westwood House Gatehouse (Nos 1 and 2 fifty yards east of the house)	Westwood	Gatehouse	1660-70	14 March 1969	SO8762163940; 52°16′24″N 2°10′58″W	1350205	Westwood House Gatehouse (Nos 1 and 2 fifty yards east of the house) More images
Westwood House Falcon Tower (thirty-five yards north-west of the house - in left foreground in image)	Westwood	Tower	Mid C20	14 March 1969	SO8761063989; 52°16′26″N 2°10′59″W	1296011	Westwood House Falcon Tower (thirty-five yards north-west of the house - in left foreground in image)
Westwood House Herons' Tower (thirty-five yards south-east of the house)	Westwood	Tower	Mid C20	14 March 1969	SO8758163913; 52°16′24″N 2°11′00″W	1173901	Westwood House Herons' Tower (thirty-five yards south-east of the house)
Church of St John the Baptist	Wickhamford	Church	13th century	30 July 1959	SP0680842262; 52°04′43″N 1°54′07″W	1287774	Church of St John the Baptist More images

== Wyre Forest ==
Name	Location	Type	Completed	Date designated	Grid ref. Geo-coordinates	Entry number	Image
Severn Bridge Including Flanking Arches and Balustrade	Bewdley	Bridge	1798	22 April 1950	SO7873875444; 52°22′36″N 2°18′50″W	1100000	Severn Bridge Including Flanking Arches and Balustrade More images
Church of St Cassian	Chaddesley Corbett	Parish Church	12th century	25 February 1958	SO8913073595; 52°21′37″N 2°09′40″W	1100682	Church of St Cassian More images
Harvington Hall and Attached East Bridge	Harvington, Chaddesley Corbett	Country House	Late C16/Early 17th century	25 February 1958	SO8775374435; 52°22′04″N 2°10′53″W	1348331	Harvington Hall and Attached East Bridge More images
Church of St Leonard	Ribbesford	Church	Early 12th century	25 February 1958	SO7863274019; 52°21′50″N 2°18′55″W	1115135	Church of St Leonard More images
Church of Saint Peter and Saint Paul	Rock	Church	Late 12th century	25 February 1958	SO7315471159; 52°20′16″N 2°23′44″W	1100696	Church of Saint Peter and Saint Paul More images
The Parish Church of St Mary and All Saints	Kidderminster	Parish Church	1315	20 October 1952	SO8301576947; 52°23′25″N 2°15′04″W	1100050	The Parish Church of St Mary and All Saints More images

== See also ==
Category:Grade I listed buildings in Worcestershire
