= Peter's Pence =

Donations or payments made directly to the Holy See of the Catholic Church

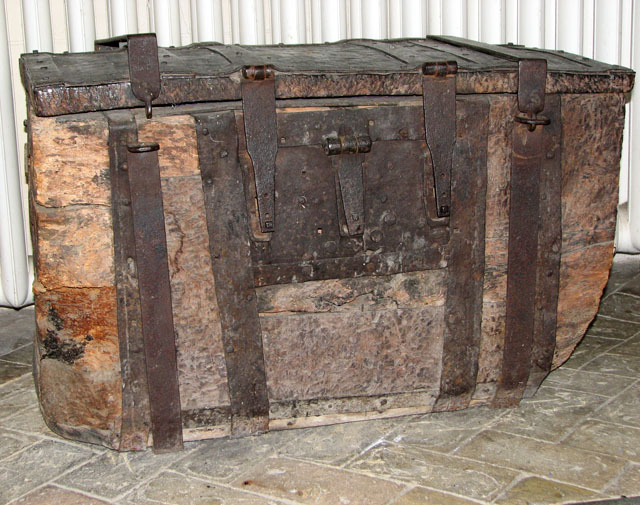
Box for Peter's pence in St Mary's church, Dennington, England.

Peter's Pence (or Denarii Sancti Petri and "Alms of St Peter") are donations or payments made directly to the Holy See of the Catholic Church. The practice began under the Saxons in England and spread through Europe. Both before and after the Norman Conquest the practice varied by time and place: initially, it was given as a pious contribution, whereas later it was required by various rulers and collected like a tax. Though formally discontinued in England at the time of the Reformation, a post-Reformation payment of uncertain character was seen in some English manors into the 19th century. In 1871, Pope Pius IX formalized the practice of lay members of the church and "other persons of good will" providing financial support to the Roman See. Modern "Peter's Pence" proceeds are used by the Pope for philanthropic works throughout the world and for administrative costs of the Vatican state.

== Medieval payment (1031–1555) ==
The term Peter's pence, in its Latin form, first appeared in writing in 1031. However, the payment may not have had a single origin under the Saxons. It was applied by the Normans to Ireland as a 'penny per hearth' annual tax in the later part of the twelfth century under the Papal Bull Laudabiliter. The traditional scholarly view is summarized in Jacob's Law Dictionary. Otherwise called by Saxons the Romefeoh (the fee due to Rome), it was a tribute, or rather an alms, given by Ina, King of the West Saxons, on his pilgrimage to Rome in 725. A similar "contribution" was also collected by Offa, King of the Mercians, throughout his dominions, in 794. However, it was said to be not a tribute to the pope, but for the maintenance of the English School or College at Rome. It was called Peter's pence because a penny from every house (subject to a means test) was collected on 1 August, the feast day of St. Peter ad Vincula. The penny of Offa was a small silver coin. King Edgar’s laws contained a sharp Constitution touching this money (Leg. Edg 78 c 4)

Some sources give the Anglo-Saxon term Romescot instead of Romefeoh.

The Offa story is elaborated in later accounts of unknown reliability:

Ethelbert, king of the East Angles, having reigned single some time, thought fit to take a wife; for this purpose he came to the court of Offa, king of Mercia, to desire his daughter in marriage. Cynethryth, consort of Offa, a cruel, ambitious, and blood-thirsty woman, who envied the retinue and splendor of the unsuspicious king, resolved in some manner to have him murdered, before he left their court, hoping by that to gain his immense riches; for this purpose she, with her malicious and fascinating arts, overcame the king–her husband, which she most cunningly effected, and, under deep disguises, laid open to him her portentous design; a villain was therefore hired, named Gimberd, who was to murder the innocent prince.

The manner in which the heinous crime was effected was as cowardly as it was fatal: under the chair of state in which Ethelbert sat, a deep pit was dug; at the bottom of it was placed the murderer; the unfortunate king was then let through a trap-door into the pit; his fear overcame him so much, that he did not attempt resistance. Three months after this, Queenrid died, when circumstances convinced Offa of the innocence of Ethelbert; he, therefore, to appease his guilt, built St. Alban's monastery, gave one-tenth part of his goods to the poor, and went in penance to Rome, where he gave to the Pope a penny for every house in his dominions.

The earliest documentary evidence concerning these payments is found in a letter written from Rome by King Canute to the English clergy in 1031. At that time, Canute was collecting a levy of one penny on each hearth or household, using a means test requiring that the household have an annual rental cost of thirty pence or more; households paying less than that in rent were exempt.

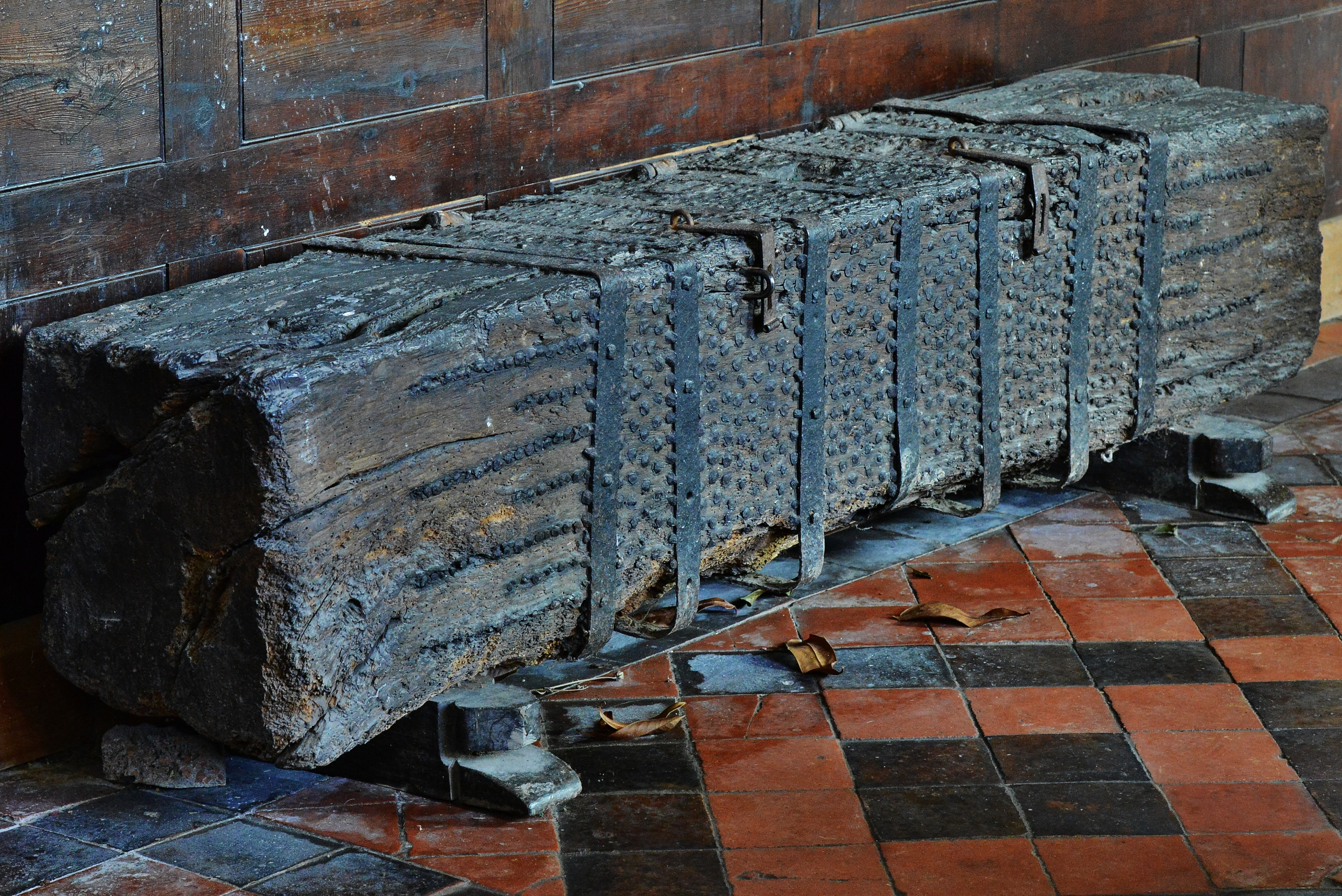
Chest used for storing Peter's Pence donations in the Church of St Peter and St Paul, Rock, Worcestershire.

Over time, the payment came to be regarded as a tax rather than an offering, and payment was apt to be avoided, if possible, the more so as time went on. Indeed, in the 13th century, the revenue arising from it had been stabilized, on the basis of the assessment of a much earlier day, at the annual sum of £20 1s. 9d. for the whole of England. Pope Clement V pressed to return to the more rewarding ancient basis of a penny from each sufficient household. By the 14th century, a standard sum, typically 5s. per manor or parish, was being given to local church authorities for forwarding. It appears that new tenants entering on a property which had historically been subject to a Peter's Pence levy did not always accept the obligation to pay.

Older sources are often unclear in their references to Peter's Pence, and there was (and remains) a degree of local confusion between it, various hearth taxes (sometimes called smoke-money or smoke-farthings), and other ancient payments.

By the end of the 12th century, the English population had increased, so the ecclesiastical authorities were collecting more than the stabilized sum, and keeping the surplus.

It ceased to be remitted to the pope after 1320, but seemingly this was not permanent. The exact reason for the 'prohibition' by Edward III is unknown, but the threat of withholding payment of Peter's Pence proved more than once a useful weapon against uncooperative popes in the hands of English kings. In 1366 and for some years after, it was refused on the grounds of the pope's obstinacy. Evidently, however, the payment survived or was revived in some localities, because it was one of many payments abolished by an Act of Parliament in the 25th year of Henry VIII's reign. The 1534 Act, "An Act for the exoneration of exactions paid to the See of Rome", specifically mentions Peter's Pence. Along with other payments, it was "never more to be levied … to any person", indicating that the payment was to be extinguished completely and not diverted to crown use. This occurred just prior to Henry's permanent break from the Church, which occurred in 1536, making England part of the Protestant Reformation.

However, under the Catholic Queen Mary, Henry VIII's reformation legislation was overturned. On 16 January 1555, royal assent was given to "An Act, repealing all Statutes, Articles, and Provisions, made against the See of Rome, sithence the 20th Year of King Henry the Eighth; and for the Establishment of Ecclesiastical Possessions conveyed to the Laity" (1 & 2 Philip & Mary c.8). However, this act did not mention Peter's Pence specifically. There is isolated evidence that in some parishes, payment of Peter's Pence did indeed resume during Mary's reign, for instance in Rowington, Warwickshire, where the church accounts for 1556 record the collection of 54s. 4d., a considerable sum. Mary's Act was in turn repealed by the 1559 Act of Supremacy, under the Protestant Queen Elizabeth I.

== Post-Reformation practice in England ==
Despite the unequivocal abolition called for by the 1559 Act, payments termed Peter's Pence undoubtedly continued in England in the succeeding centuries. In one Devon parish, there is a record regarding 1609–1610 that states "besides 2s. for Peter's farthings there is a payment of 2s. for Peter's pence". In Gloucestershire, a survey of the then royal manor of Cheltenham in 1617 asked tenants, "whether there is not duly continued and paid certain moneys called peter pence; if not when did they discontinue and what was the sum of them and to whom was it paid?" This question indicates that at the least, Gloucester recognized that practices varied. The reply given was that, "the moneys called Peter Pence are commonly every year paid unto the Bailiff and are not discontinued to their knowledge, and the sum of them by the year is 5s. or thereabouts, as they think". This suggests that originally some 60 households contributed annually. The survey makes no mention of when in the year the payment was made, and whether the bailiff passed the money on or retained it on the lord's behalf. (Pre-Reformation practice in Cheltenham had called for payment—invariably of 5s.—on the accustomed date of 1 August, as above.) In Cheltenham manorial records, occasional references to properties being liable for Peter's Pence are seen until as late as 1802, but there is no direct evidence of any actual payment.

An Act of Parliament obtained in 1625 to clarify manorial customs in Cheltenham acknowledges the continued existence of Peter's Pence: "And be it enacted … that the said copyholders … shall … hold the said customary messuages and lands of the said manors severally and respectively, by copies of court-roll to them and their heirs, by suit of court, and by the yearly rents, worksilver, Peter-pence, and Bead Reap-money, to be paid severally and respectively as heretofore…"

It is uncertain how exceptional the situation in Cheltenham may have been. It is possible that the label Peter's Pence had been transferred to some other type of household or hearth tax. Some evidence for this comes from references in Minchinhampton (Gloucestershire) churchwardens' accounts of 1575 to "Peter-pence or smoke-farthings" expended at the time of the bishop's visitation in the summer. Smoke-farthings are glossed as a composition for offerings made in Whitsun week by every man who occupied a house with a chimney, to the cathedral of the diocese in which he lived; and that though Peter's pence was abolished in 1534, "on the grant of those monasteries to whom they had by custom become payable, they continued payable as appendant to the manors etc of the persons to whom granted". Before the Reformation, the lordship of the manor of Cheltenham had been held by the Abbess of Syon. It is plausible therefore that as both the pious payment of Peter's Pence and the secular manorial fees had once gone to the same institution, the former came over time to be regarded as part of the latter.

== Revived custom ==
In 1871, Pope Pius IX formalized the practice of lay members of Church and "other persons of good will" – providing financial support directly to the Papal Treasury. In general, contributions go to the local parish or diocese, who then provide contributions to support higher level offices. Collections for Peter's Pence go directly to Rome. Pius IX approved this practice in the encyclical Saepe venerabilis, issued on 5 August 1871. The money collected is today used by the pope for philanthropic purposes.

At present, this collection is taken each year on the Sunday closest to 29 June, the Solemnity of Saints Peter and Paul in the liturgical calendar. As of 2012, the United States has donated the largest amounts, giving some 28% of the total, followed by Italy, Germany, Spain, France, Ireland, Brazil and South Korea. US donations totaled $75.8 million in 2008, $82.5 million in 2009, $67.7 million in 2010 and $69.7 million in 2011.

== Finances ==
In 2019, it was revealed that the charity had secretly been used by people within the Vatican to buy luxury property in London and to finance movies such as the 2019 Elton John biopic Rocketman. It has also been used to finance the budget deficit of the Holy See. As a partial justification for this, Gladden Pappin and Edoardo Bueri, two commentators in the University of Notre Dame's Church Life Journal, have argued that, “without significant territory in which to invest its assets for the good of residents, the Holy See has to engage in the normal investing operations that other sovereign states do.”

== See also ==
- Institute for the Works of Religion
