= Humphrey Coningsby (disambiguation) =

Humphrey Coningsby (c. 1623–?) was an English politician.

Humphrey Coningsby may also refer to:

- Humphrey Coningsby (judge) (died 1535), English lawyer and judge
- Humphrey Coningsby (died 1559), MP for Herefordshire
- Humphrey Coningsby (died 1601), MP for St Albans
