= Defford =

Village in Worcestershire, England

Coordinates: 52.087346°N 2.119104°W

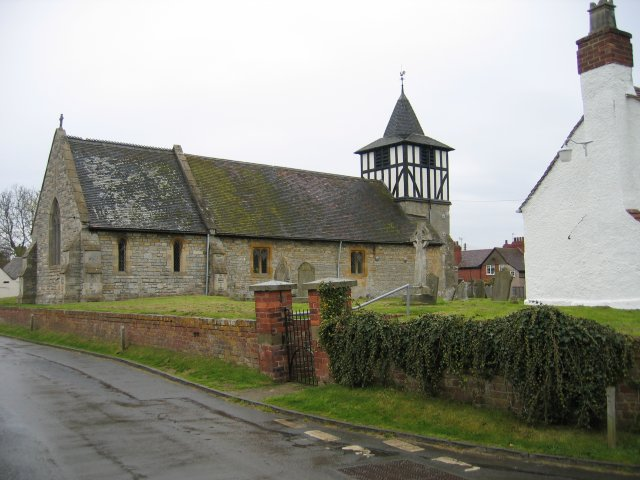
- St James' Church, Defford

- Location within Worcestershire
- District: Wychavon
- Shire county: Worcestershire
- Region: West Midlands
- Country: England
- Sovereign state: United Kingdom
- Post town: Worcester
- Postcode district: WR8

Defford is a small village in the county of Worcestershire, England, located between the towns of Pershore and Upton-upon-Severn. It was once part of the Royal forest of Horewell. The woodlands were mostly removed around the time of the Civil War.

The name Defford derives from the Old English dēopford meaning 'deep ford'.

Defford also has a primary school, Defford cum Besford First School, and three pubs.

Defford is home to one of the radio telescopes that make up the Jodrell Bank MERLIN (Multi-Element Radio Linked Interferometer Network) radio telescope array linking six observing stations that together form a powerful telescope with an effective aperture of over 217 kilometres.

== Defford Village Hall ==
The village hall is owned and run by a charity, the Defford Village Hall Trust, and managed by a committee of trustees . In 2011 the new village hall was built on a greenfield site some 50 yards to the south west of the old hall, adjacent to the car park. The hall was designed by a Defford resident and trustee, David Bakefield, who was instrumental in bringing the project to fruition. It has become the focal point of village life, well used by local clubs and societies.

== Defford airfield ==
In 1941 during World War II, a Royal Air Force airfield was constructed mainly for the flying experiments for radar that was being developed in nearby Malvern. For a few months the airfield was used as a satellite station by the Wellington bomber training unit located at RAF Pershore.

A small grass airstrip remains on the now disused airfield that has been used as a location for telecommunications installations. The site is now owned and used by the West Mercia Constabulary, but the central part of the airfield still houses a Satellite Communications facility now operated by QinetiQ.

== Village hall reconstruction ==
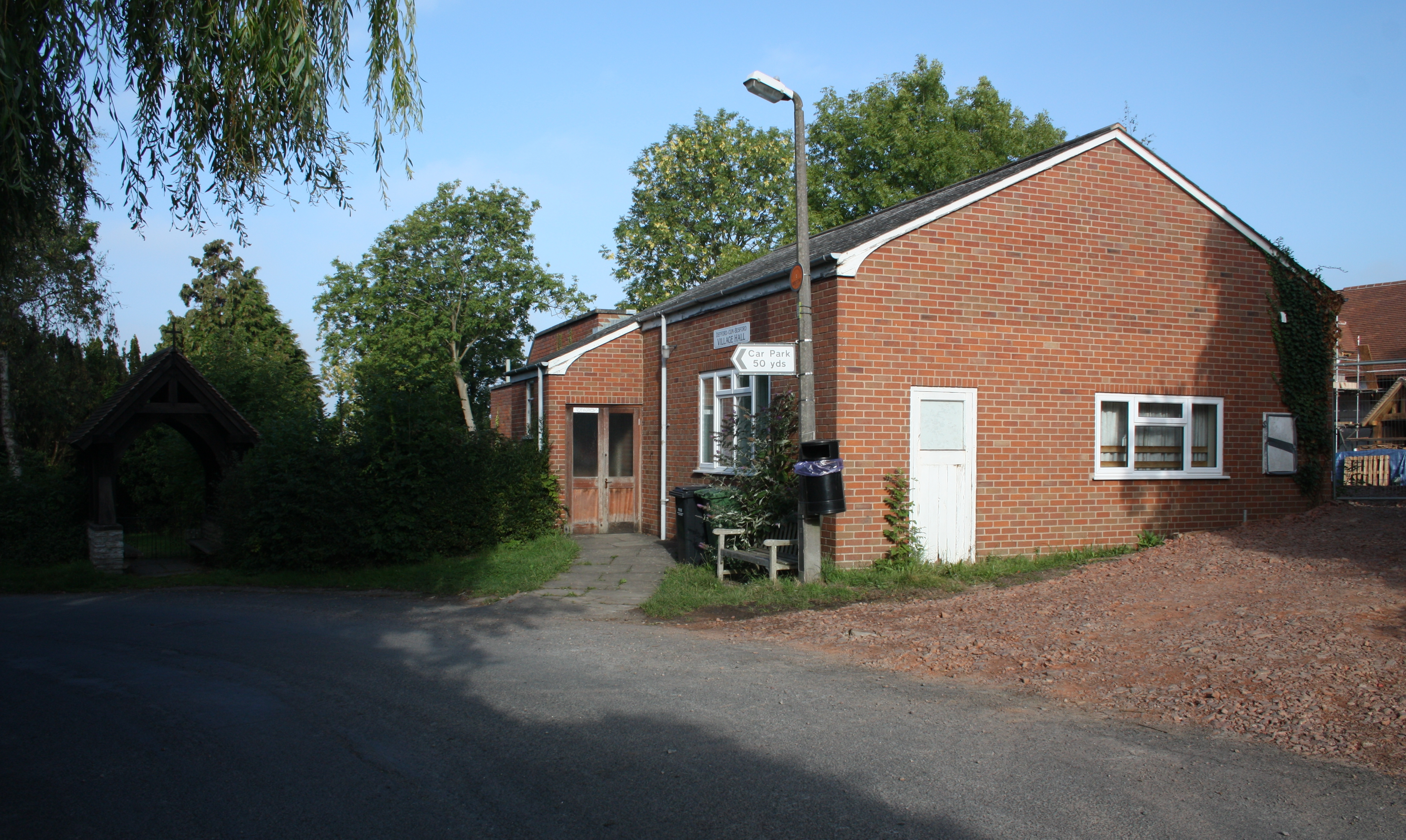
Old Village Hall

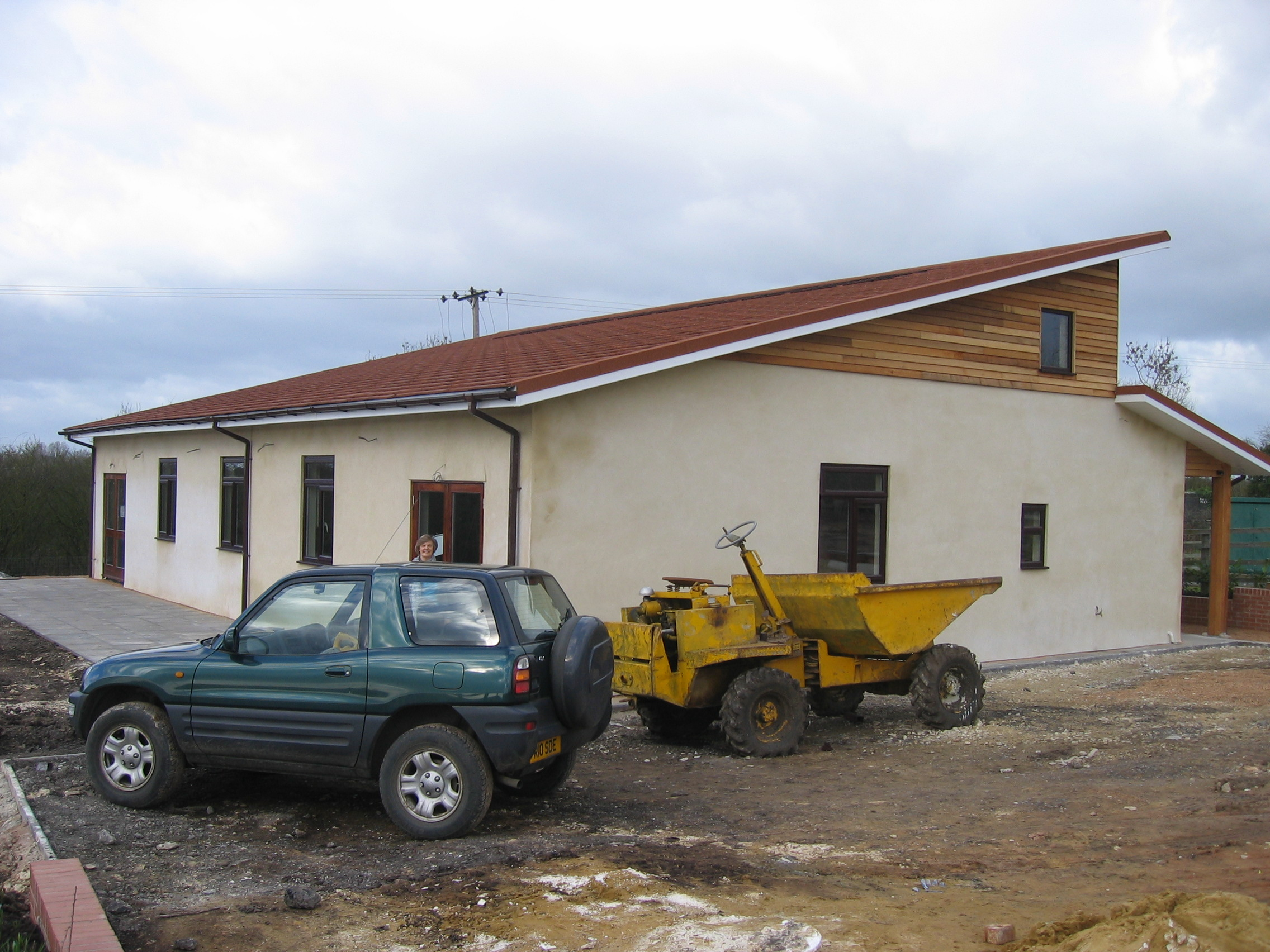
New hall under construction

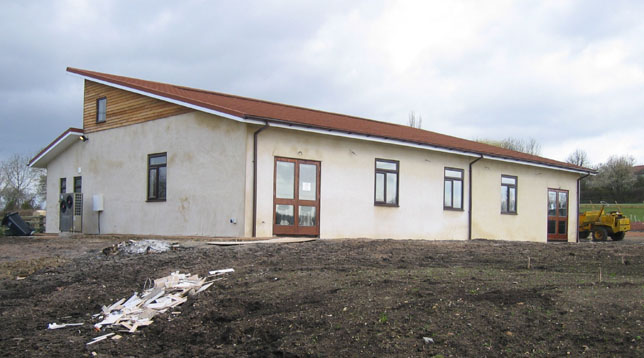
Work in progress

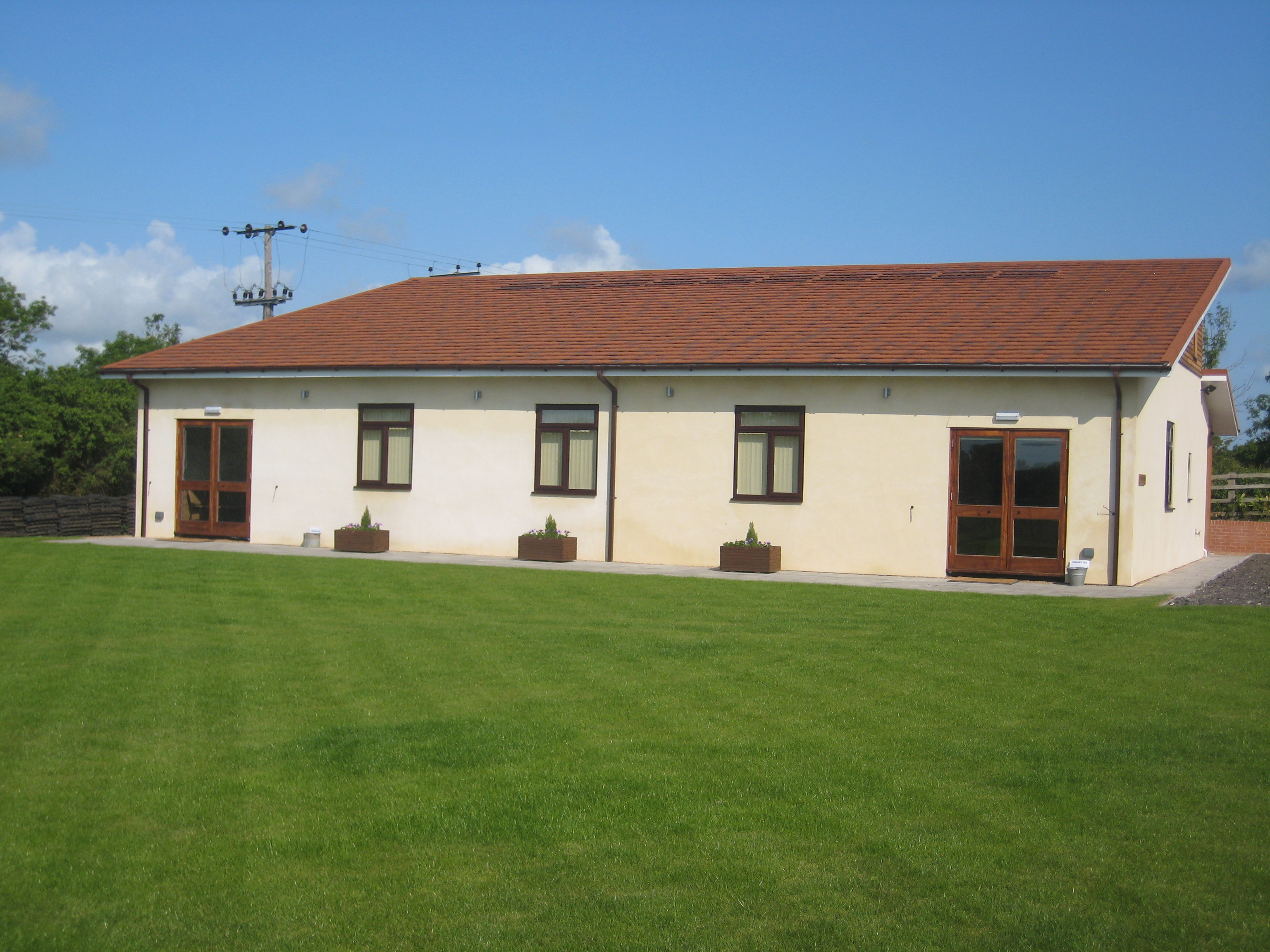
Completed hall

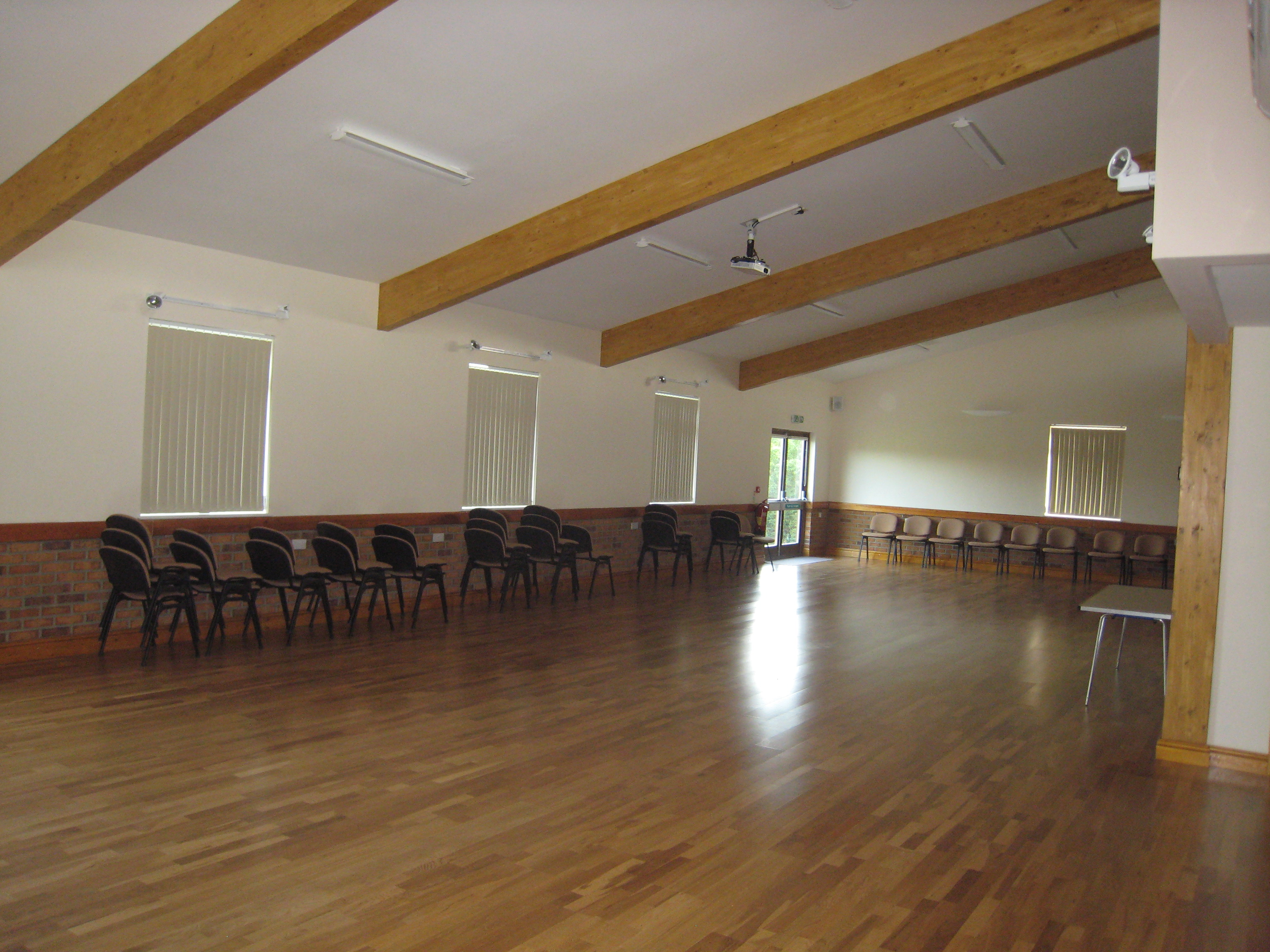
Interior
