= Humphrey Coningsby (judge) =

English judge

Sir Humphrey Coningsby
- Born: 1459; Rock, Worcestershire, England
- Died: 2 June 1535 (aged 75–76); England
- Occupations: Lawyer, judge
- Parent(s): Thomas Coningsby, Catherine Waldiffe

Sir Humphrey Coningsby, (c. 1459 – 2 June 1535), was an English lawyer, a Justice of the King's Bench, and a major landholder.

== Origins ==
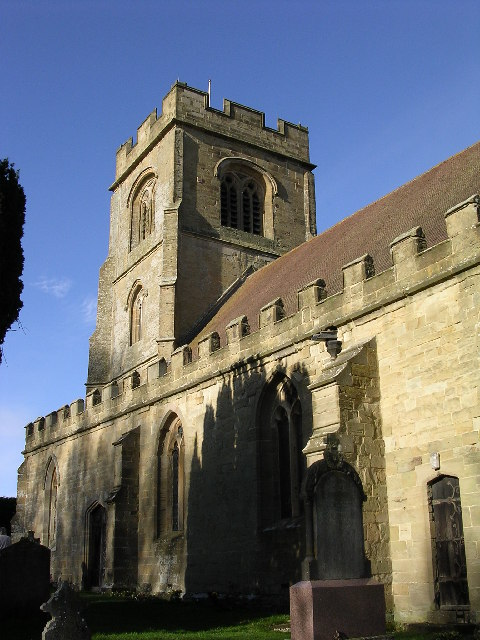
Church of St Peter and St Paul, Rock

Humphrey Coningsby was born shortly before 1460, the son of Thomas Coningsby and his wife Catherine Waldiffe, at the village of Rock in Worcestershire, where his father held the manor of Bower, which had been in the family since at least 1351.

== Career ==
Entering the law, Coningsby practiced as an attorney in the Court of Common Pleas by 1474 and in 1476 acted as Deputy to the Sheriff of Worcestershire. In the 1480s he was the third Prothonotary, the Clerk of Assize on the Western Circuit, and became a Bencher of the Inner Temple. Chosen a justice of the peace for Hertfordshire in 1493, he was created a Serjeant-at-Law in 1495, with clients including Queen Elizabeth and the Duke of Buckingham. In 1504, he was added to the commission of the peace for Worcestershire and was promoted to King's Serjeant in 1505. On 21 May 1509, he became a Justice of the King's Bench, being knighted by King Henry VIII that year, and held his position until 28 November 1533.

== Landholdings ==
In parallel with his legal work, Coningsby actively acquired country estates. About 1485, he was executor to Ralph Penne, owner of Penne's Place in Aldenham, Hertfordshire, which he bought. It remained in the family until 1651 From Penne he also acquired the manor of Pigott's in Aldenham.. In June 1488, jointly with his first wife Isabel, he bought from William Berkeley, then Earl of Nottingham, the manor of North Piddle in Worcestershire, which descended in the family until 1654. At the same time he acquired the manor of Stottesdon in Shropshire.

Between 1496 and 1514, Coningsby bought more manors or portions of a manor in Titburst, part of Aldenham, from the co-heiresses, but his grandson sold them in 1548. In 1506 he acquired the manor of Orleton in the parish of Eastham in Worcestershire, which his descendants sold in 1658.

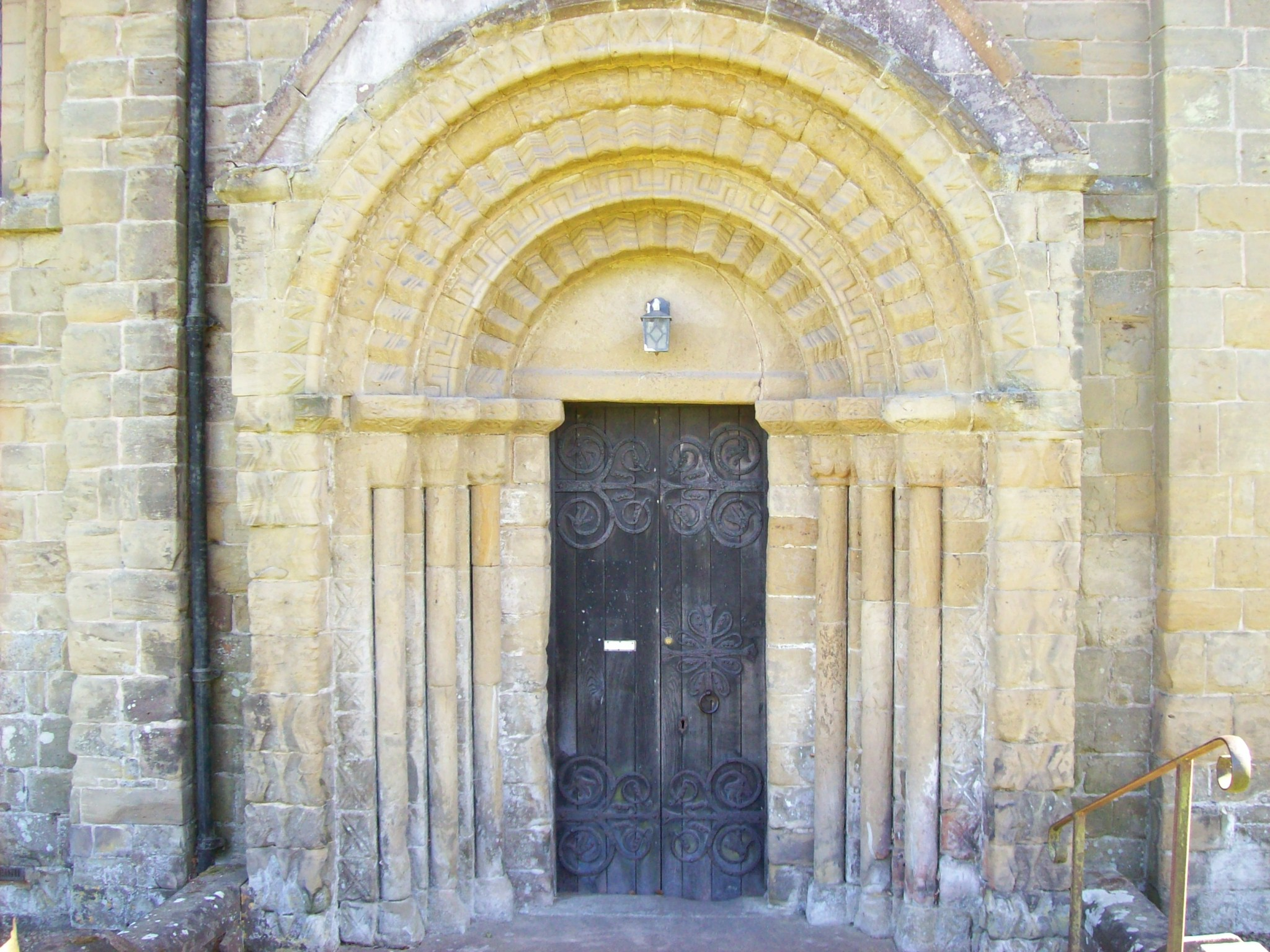
Rock Church, north door

By 1509, Coningsby had inherited his father's estate at Rock, where he built the south chapel, south aisle, and west tower of the village church, in which a window once portrayed him in a scarlet gown with his family. In 1510, he founded the chantry of our Blessed Lady and St George in the new south chapel and endowed it with lands for the support of one priest who was to say mass and run a free grammar school, which was set up in 1513. To his inheritance in the parish, he added lands by acquiring the manor of Cheney Moor in 1528, which remained in the family until 1657.

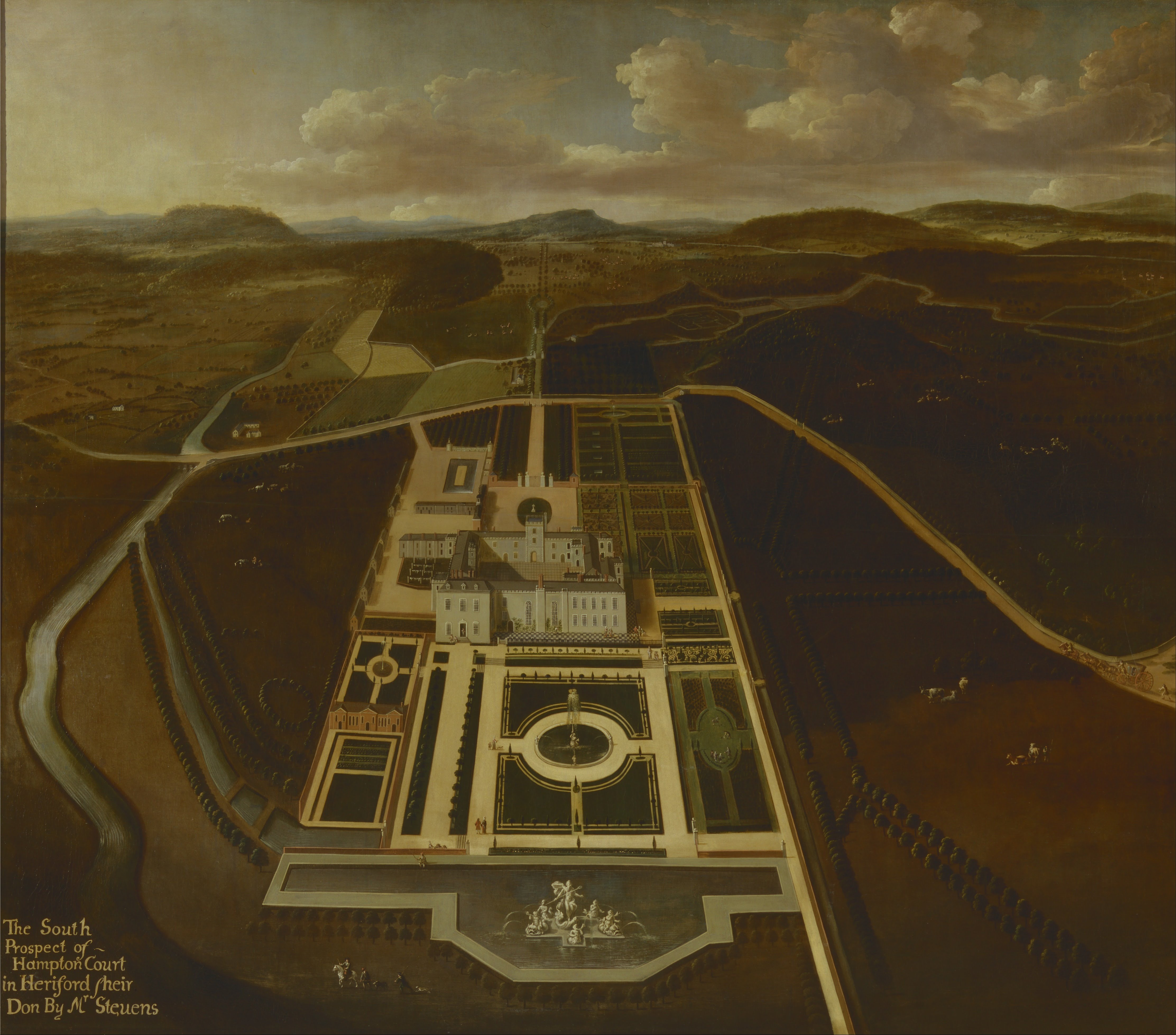
Hampton Court, Herefordshire

Around 1510 Coningsby acquired the estate of Hampton Court at Hope under Dinmore in Herefordshire, which went to his grandson Humphrey and remained in the family for nearly 300 years.

== Death and memorials ==
An inscription in Rock church, since lost, recorded: "Here lieth Thomas Coningsby, esq., who deceased A.D. 1498, father to Sir Humphrey Coningsby, knt. and one of the justices of the king's bench, who built this isle and steeple of the church, A.D. 1510, at his own charges. He died at Aldnam, in the county of Hertford, …. and is intombed in that church."

Coningsby died on 2 June 1535, and his will was proved on 26 November 1535. In it, he left rents from lands he owned in Aldenham for funding a priest to say mass for his soul in the chapel of Our Lady in the parish church for 21 years from the date of his death. He also provided for an extension of the chapel to the line of the east wall of the chancel, but this was never carried out. At Copthorne Hill in Aldenham, he had earlier founded the chapel of St Mary the Virgin and St George the Martyr, which was licensed for eucharist and baptisms in 1520. As a chantry, this chapel was destroyed under the Dissolution of Colleges Act 1547.

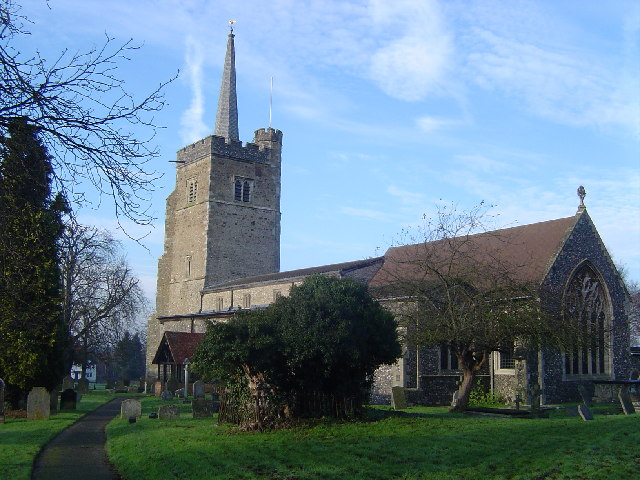
Church of St John the Baptist, Aldenham

In his native Rock, Coningsby's will left directions that the tabernacle of Our Lady he had recently had erected in the south aisle should be painted and gilded together with the image of St George, and that the image of St Margaret in the Lady Chapel should be restored.

== Marriages and children ==
Coningsby married three times. His first marriage, in the 1480s, was to Isabel Fereby, a daughter of Thomas Fereby, of St Paul's Cray, and related to Ralph Penne. In about 1499, he married Alice Francis (died 1500), the daughter and heiress of Sir John Francis and widow successively of John Worsley and William Staveley. Thirdly, in 1504, he married Anne Moresby (died 1523), the daughter and heiress of Sir Christopher Moresby, of Scaleby, and widow of James Pickering.

Coningsby's sons, all from his first marriage, were:

- Thomas Coningsby, who married Cecily Salway.
- William Coningsby, a Justice of the King's Bench.
- John Coningsby, who married Elizabeth Frowick.

His daughters were:

- Elizabeth Coningsby, who married first Richard Berkeley (died 1514), of Stoke Gifford. Her second husband was Sir John FitzJames, Lord Chief Justice of the King's Bench.
- Amphelisia Coningsby, who married Sir John Tyndall, of Hockwold.
- Margaret Coningsby, who married Sir Christopher Hilliard, of Winstead.
- Jane Coningsby, who married George Raleigh
