= Leigh Sinton =

Hamlet in Worcestershire, England

Coordinates: 52.1553°N 2.3217°W

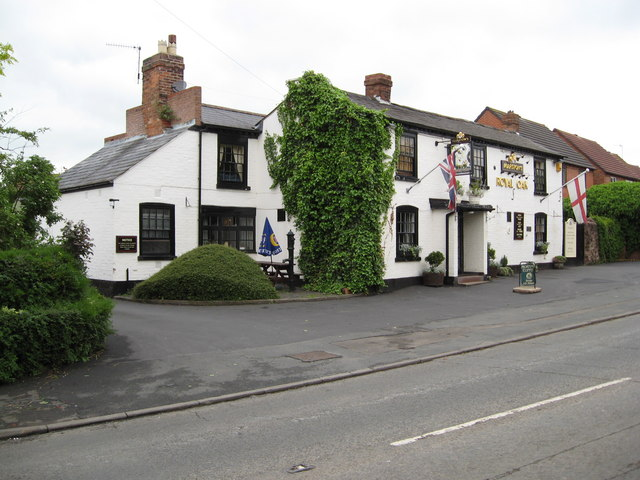
- Leigh Sinton - the Royal Oak pub 2008

- Location within Worcestershire
- OS grid reference: SO7850
- Civil parish: Leigh
- District: Malvern Hills
- Shire county: Worcestershire
- Region: West Midlands
- Country: England
- Sovereign state: United Kingdom
- Post town: MALVERN
- Postcode district: WR13
- Dialling code: 01886
- Police: West Mercia
- Fire: Hereford and Worcester
- Ambulance: West Midlands
- UK Parliament: West Worcestershire

Leigh Sinton is a hamlet in the Malvern Hills district of the county of Worcestershire, England. It is at the south end of the civil parish of Leigh. The village lies on the A4103 Worcester to Hereford road, about 5 miles out of Worcester, whilst Malvern is also about 5 miles away. It has a village pub, a small corner shop and a Chinese takeaway. The local pronunciation of Leigh is rhyming with "lie".
