= Horewell Forest =

Royal forest in England

Coordinates: 52.0996°N 2.1694°W

Horewell Forest was a royal forest, i. e. a royal game preserve. In the west, it bordered the river Severn, and Strensham in the south and extended to Pershore. Parts of it ceased to belong to the royal forest in 1229.

== Inclusions ==
As part of the Mid-Worcestershire Forest, the woodlands known as Horewell Wood still included Strensham Wood, Hill Wood, Earl's Croome, Hill Croome, Croome D'Abitot, Bucknell Wood, Sapyes Wood, Besford and Defford Woods, and Severn Stoke in the 15th century. At that time, it belonged to the Abbot of Westminster, who granted it in 1542 to the Dean and Chapter of Westminster.

The remnants of the forest remain detectable in the local biology, including unimproved commons and remnants of ancient woodlands. This is particularly true of the areas within the former Croome Estate.
