= Strensham =

Village in Worcestershire, England

Coordinates: 52.052949°N 2.144583°W

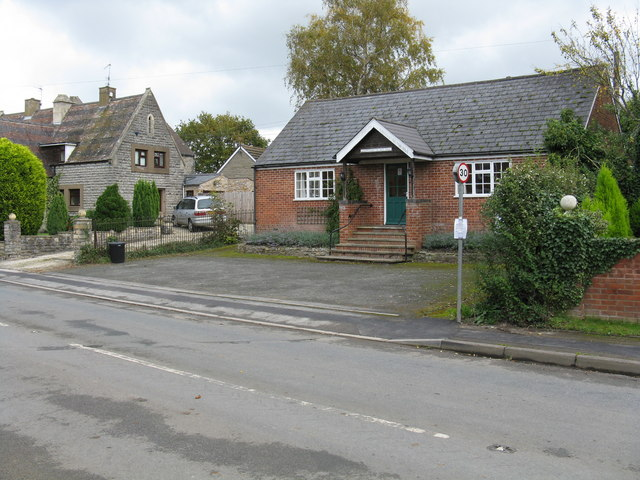
- Strensham Village Hall

- Location within Worcestershire
- Area: 3.07 sq mi (8.0 km^{2})
- Population: 314 (2001)
  - Density: 102/sq mi (39/km^{2})
- OS grid reference: SO903393
  - London: 95 miles (153 km)
- Civil parish: Strensham
- District: Wychavon
- Shire county: Worcestershire
- Region: West Midlands
- Country: England
- Sovereign state: United Kingdom
- Post town: WORCESTER
- Postcode district: WR8
- Dialling code: 01684
- Police: West Mercia
- Fire: Hereford and Worcester
- Ambulance: West Midlands

Strensham (/ˈstrɛnʃəm/ STREN-shəm) is a village in the Wychavon district of Worcestershire. In the 2001 census, the civil parish of Strensham had a population of 314 across 127 households. Since 1991, the population has risen 28.7% from 244 residents.

== History ==
The name Strensham derives from the Old English Strengshām or Strengshamm, meaning 'Streng's village/hemmed-in land'.

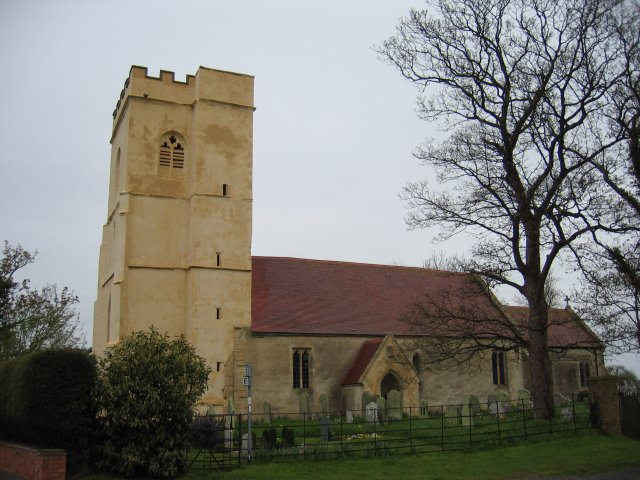
St John the Baptist's Church, Strensham

The Church of St John the Baptist lies in Lower Strensham atop a hill overlooking the River Avon, constructed in the 14th century.

Strensham was once part of the Royal forest of Horewell. The woodlands were mostly removed around the time of the English Civil War.

== Geography ==
The eastern edge of the parish lies on the banks of the River Avon, while the River Severn is 2 miles (3.2 km) to the west. Both rivers converge 4 miles (6.4 km) to the south in the Gloucestershire town of Tewkesbury.

Nearby villages include Twyning, Bredon, Eckington and Ripple. The town of Upton-upon-Severn lies 3 miles (4.8 km) to the north west.

== Transport ==
On 19 May 1966, in Nottingham, two new proposed 54-mile motorways were announced, planned by five counties. One motorway would join the M1 at Lockington in Leicestershire, and to join the M5 at Rashwood in Worcestershire. This became the M42. The A42 would later terminate at Lockington.

The proposed 54-mile M69 motorway was planned to extend through Warwickshire to Strensham, on the M5. This extension of the M69 was largely built as the dual carriageway A46, around Warwick.

== Strensham services ==
The village gives its name to a motorway service area located just to the north of the village on the M5 motorway which opened with the motorway in 1962. The Midlands Air Ambulance service has been operating one of its helicopters from the services site since 1991 following a deal with the then operator, Take a Break.

== Strensham Court ==
Strensham Court was an early 19th-century country house in a landscaped park. It was built of ashlar in two storeys to a rectangular plan. A substantial portico was added later with large Ionic pillars.

The manor of Strensham belonged historically to the Russell family. The Strensham estate was purchased in 1817 from descendants of the Russell family by John Taylor, grandson of John Taylor, the wealthy Birmingham industrialist. He had a new building constructed in 1824 to replace an earlier house on the site. Taylor was High Sheriff of Worcestershire in 1817 and died unmarried in 1848. The property passed to his brother James who died soon after, then to James's son James Arthur (MP, died 1889) and to the latter's son Arthur James.

The house was vacated in 1935, occupied during World War II by the Convent School from Acocks Green in Birmingham, thereafter becoming derelict, and demolished after a fire in November 1974.

== Notable residents ==
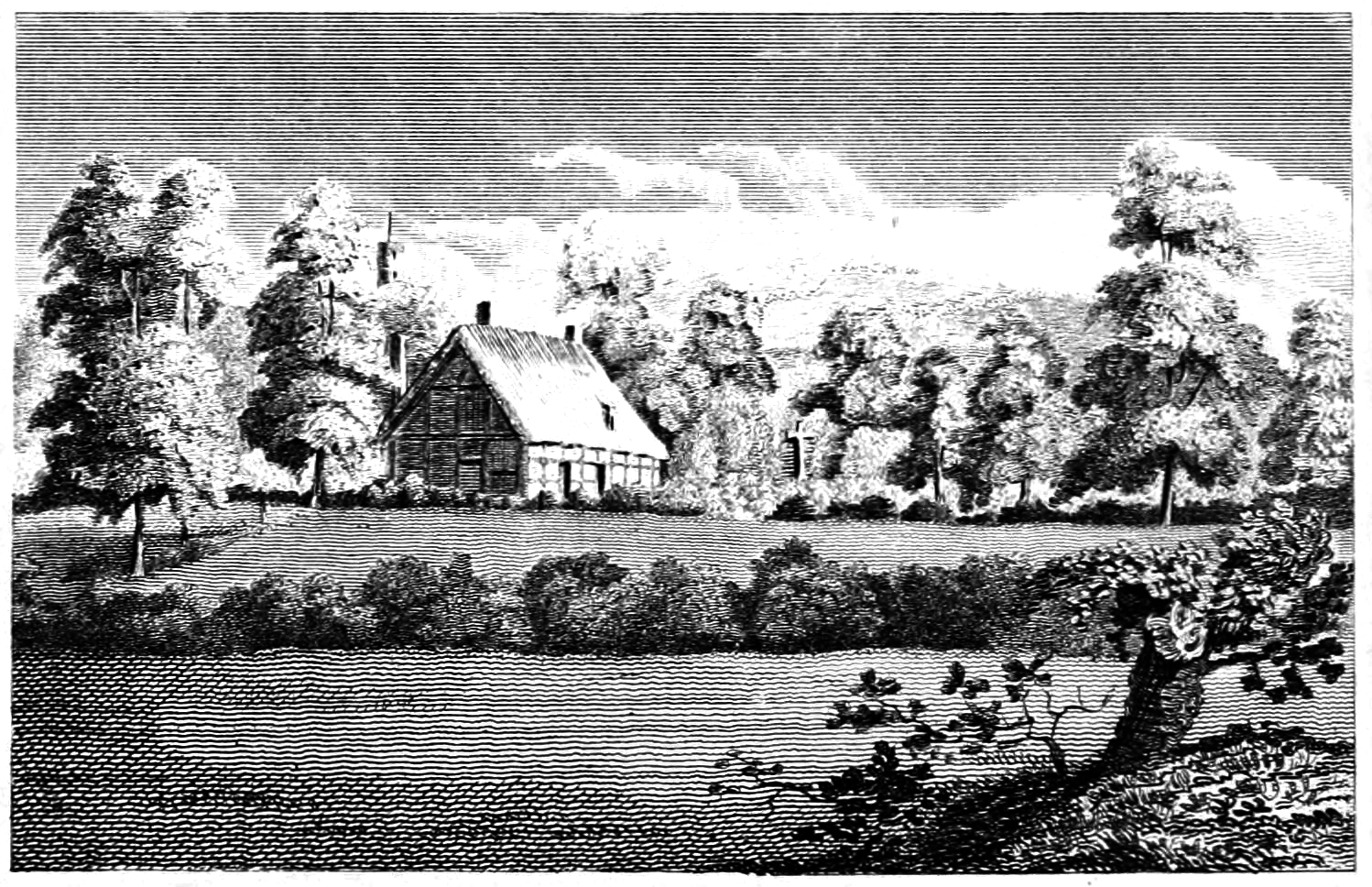
Samuel Butler's tenement in Strensham

- Samuel Butler, a poet, was baptized in the village in February 1613. He was buried in St Paul's, Covent Garden and a memorial later placed in Westminster Abbey
- Treadway Russell Nash, Rector in 1792, partly responsible for re-popularising Butler
