= Leigh, Worcestershire =

Village in Worcestershire, England

Coordinates: 52.1789°N 2.318°W

Leigh
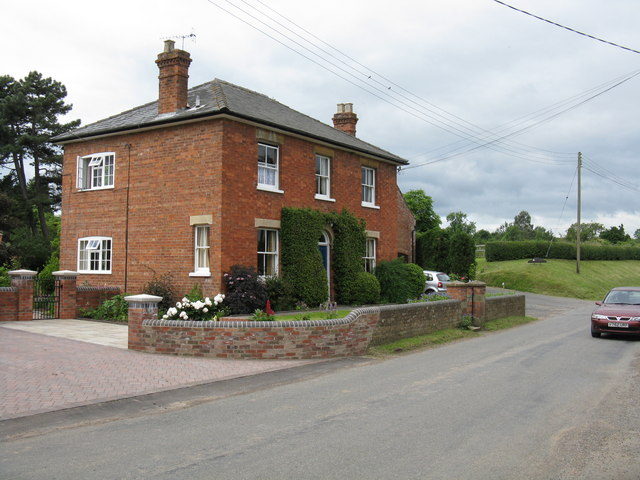
- Leigh - house at the village centre

- Location within Worcestershire
- Population: 1,589 (Parish, 2021)
- OS grid reference: SO783534
- Civil parish: Leigh
- District: Malvern Hills
- Shire county: Worcestershire
- Region: West Midlands
- Country: England
- Sovereign state: United Kingdom
- Post town: WORCESTER
- Postcode district: WR6
- Police: West Mercia
- Fire: Hereford and Worcester
- Ambulance: West Midlands
- UK Parliament: West Worcestershire

Leigh is a village and civil parish in the Malvern Hills district of Worcestershire, England. The local pronunciation is that the name rhymes with "lie". The village is 4 miles (6 km) west of Worcester and 5 miles (8 km) north of Malvern. As well as the small village of Leigh itself, the parish also includes the larger village of Leigh Sinton, which is in the south of the parish on the A4103, the main road linking Worcester and Hereford. The parish also covers surrounding rural areas and has a number of small hamlets, including Brockamin and Smith End Green. At the 2021 census the parish had a population of 1,589. It shares a grouped parish council with the neighbouring parish of Bransford.

== History ==
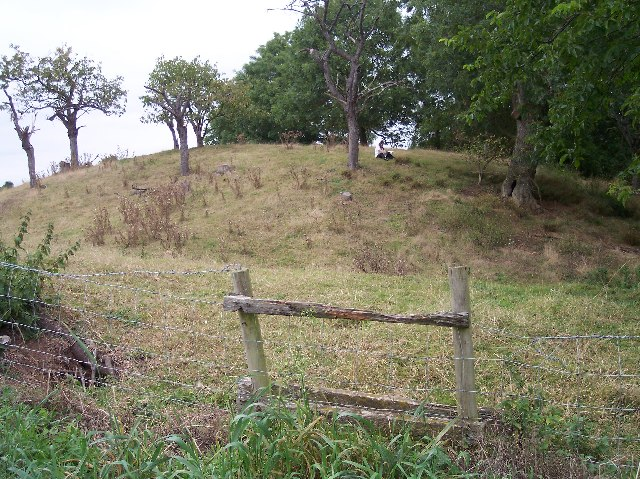
Leigh Castle Tump

Leigh's Norman church (St. Edburga's) was built in 1100 by Benedictine monks from Pershore Abbey. It is listed by English heritage as a Grade I listed building.

Leigh Court Barn is the largest and one of the oldest cruck framed barns in Britain.

A mile to the south at Castle Green are the earthwork and buried remains of a medieval motte and bailey castle.

Enclosures of common lands caused riots at Leigh in 1778, where anti-enclosure rioters attacked the physical enclosure:

with their faces blackened and being otherwise disguised, and armed with guns and other offensive weapons; … in the most daring manner did cut down, burn, and entirely destroy all the posts, gates and rails.

Leigh was an ancient parish in the Pershore hundred of Worcestershire. The parish historically included Bransford, which was a chapelry, having its own chapel of ease. Parish functions under the poor laws from the 17th century onwards were exercised separately for the chapelry of Bransford and the rest of Leigh parish. As such, Bransford became a separate civil parish in 1866 when the legal definition of 'parish' was changed to be the areas used for administering the poor laws. It remained a chapelry of Leigh parish for ecclesiastical purposes. From 1836, both Leigh and Bransford formed part of the Martley Poor Law Union, created under the Poor Law Amendment Act 1834 to collectively deliver certain aspects of the poor laws, including the provision of a workhouse to serve the area at Martley.

A local legend says the area is reputedly haunted by the ghost of a robber named Edmund Colles, who is said to appear in a coach drawn by four fire-breathing horses.

== Governance ==
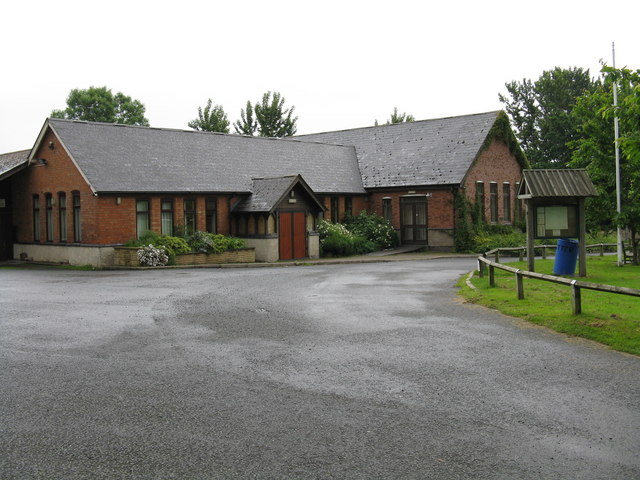
Leigh and Bransford Memorial Hall

There are three tiers of local government covering Leigh, at parish, district and county level: Leigh and Bransford Parish Council, Malvern Hills District Council, and Worcestershire County Council. The parish council is a grouped parish council, also covering the neighbouring parish of Bransford. The parish council generally meets at Leigh and Bransford Memorial Hall at Smith End Green.
