= Rock moated site and medieval village =

Archaeological site in Worcestershire, England

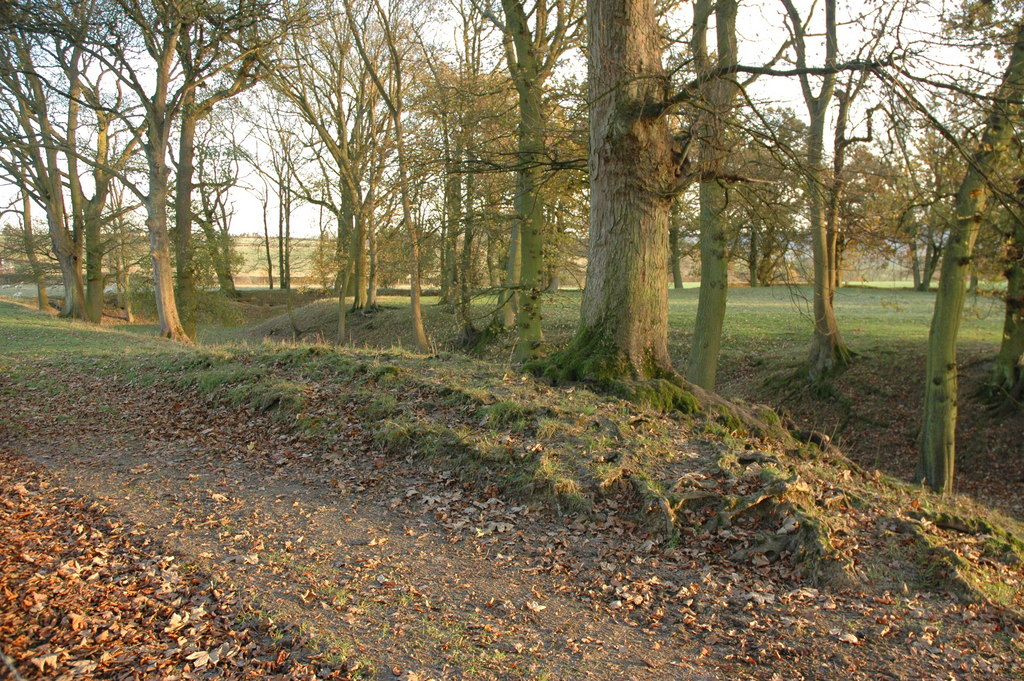
- Part of the moat, viewed from the north-west

- Location within Worcestershire
- 52°20′14″N 2°23′38″W
- Location: Worcestershire
- OS grid reference: SO 733 711

Scheduled monument
- Designated: 21 July 1992
- Reference no.: 108658

Rock moated site and medieval village is an archaeological site, including a deserted medieval village, in Worcestershire, England, near the village of Rock and about 4 miles (6.4 km) south-west of Bewdley. It is a Scheduled Monument.

== History ==
Rock in medieval times is known to have been larger than it now is: in 1328, Henry de Ribbesford, who held Rock, had a grant of a weekly market and of a yearly fair on the feast of St Margaret and two days following.

A moat was usually created as a status symbol, around a domestic or religious building, rather than for practical defence. The reason for this moat is not known. In a description of the village in 1924, for the Victoria County History series, it was thought to be possibly the site of a cattle enclosure.

The Church of St Peter and St Paul in Rock dates from the 12th century, with additions during the 14th century and restoration in the late 19th century.

== Earthworks ==
The moated enclosure lies immediately south-east of the church. It measures 114 metres (374 ft) north to south and 110 metres (360 ft) west to east; the ditch is about 3 metres (9.8 ft) deep with a bank on its outer edge. Halfway along the west side is an original entrance 7 metres (23 ft) wide. The space enclosed is about 0.3 hectares (0.74 acres); the uneven ground there indicates that there are buried features.

Adjacent to the north-east is the site of a medieval settlement; it has been ploughed in recent times, but evidence remains of streets, orientated north-west to south-east, and homesteads of the village.

== See also ==
- List of lost settlements in the United Kingdom
