= Greyfriars, Worcester =

Grade I listed building in Worcester, United Kingdom

Coordinates: 52.190473°N 2.219013°W

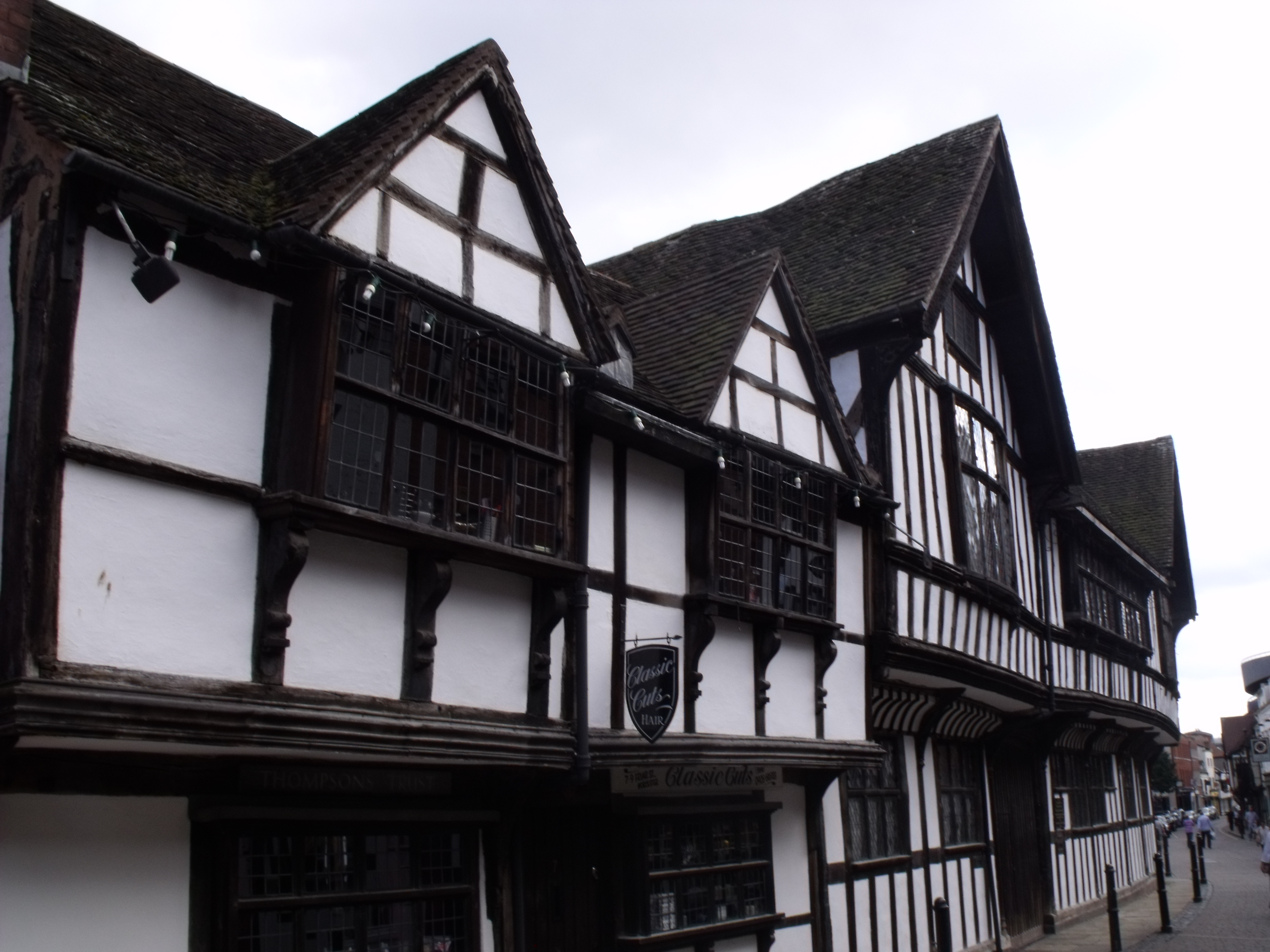
The Greyfriars, Friar Street, Worcester

Greyfriars, Worcester is a Grade I listed building in Worcester, England. Its location near to a former friary of the Franciscan order of Greyfriars has in the past led to speculation that it was constructed as their guest house, but it is now believed to have been built as a house and brew-house c.1485 for Thomas Grene, brewer and High Bailiff of Worcester from 1493-1497. It has been in the ownership of the National Trust since 1966.

== Architecture ==
Greyfriars is a two storey timber frame building with close studding and jettied upperfloor. It is 69 feet long and has a curved facade that follows the line of the street. It has been subject to numerous extensions and alterations throughout its life.

== Burials in the Friary ==
- William de Beauchamp (d.1268)
- William de Beauchamp, 9th Earl of Warwick and his wife Maud FitzJohn, Countess of Warwick
