= St John the Baptist's Church, Strensham =

Church in Worcestershire, England

Coordinates: 52.0639°N 2.1316°W

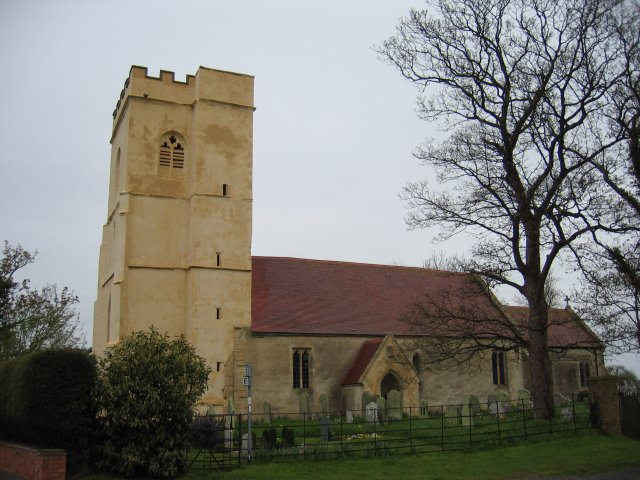
- St John the Baptist's Church, Strensham, from the south

- Location in Worcestershire
- OS grid reference: SO 910 406
- Location: Strensham, Worcestershire
- Country: England
- Denomination: Anglican
- Website: Churches Conservation Trust

Architecture
- Functional status: Redundant
- Heritage designation: Grade I
- Designated: 11 February 1965
- Architectural type: Church
- Style: Gothic

Specifications
- Materials: Chancel brick, otherwise grey lias rubble, all rendered, roofs tiled

St John the Baptist's Church is a redundant Anglican church in the village of Strensham, Worcestershire, England. It is recorded in the National Heritage List for England as a designated Grade I listed building, and is under the care of the Churches Conservation Trust. Clifton-Taylor includes the church in his list of 'best' English parish churches.

== History ==
Although the church probably originated earlier, the earliest fabric still present is from the 14th century. This is to be found in the nave and the chancel. The tower was added in the late 14th or in the 15th century, and the nave windows were altered in the 15th century. In the early 19th century the vestry was added. The church has been in the care of the Churches Conservation Trust since 1991.

== Architecture ==
=== Exterior ===
The vestry is constructed in brick, and the rest of the church is in grey lias rubble. The whole of the exterior is rendered, and the roofs are tiled. Its plan consists of a nave, a lower and narrower chancel, a south porch, a north vestry, and a west tower. The tower is in three stages, with diagonal buttresses on the west corners, and a stair turret on the south east. In the lowest stage is a west doorway, above which is a three-light Perpendicular window. The middle stage contains a single-light window on the west side. The top stage contains a two-light bell opening on each side, and at the summit of the tower is an embattled parapet. In the chancel, the east window has three lights, the south wall contains a priest's door and a two-light window, and the north wall has a single-light window. The vestry has an embattled parapet. In both the north and south walls of the nave are a doorway, one single-light and two two-light windows. Above the south doorway is a sundial.

=== Interior ===
The walls and ceilings are plastered. Both the nave and the chancel have barrel roofs. The nave is floored with 15th-century tiles and bricks at the west end. The chancel is paved with stone. At the west end is a gallery which has been reconstructed from a 15th or 16th century oak rood screen. It is elaborately carved and on its front are 23 painted panels. The central one contains a depiction of Christ, and the others contain apostles, saints and other church figures. The font dates from the 19th century and is in Norman style. The pulpit and attached reading desk date from about 1700, and the benches are from the mid-16th century. There is a large box pew at the east end of the nave. Above the chancel arch are the Royal arms of George III and two hatchments. On the west wall of the nave are boards containing the Lord's Prayer, the Ten Commandments and the Apostles' Creed.

In the chancel are a number of monuments to the Russell family, the earliest dating from the later part of the 14th century. There are a number of brasses, the oldest being that of Sir Robert Russell who died in 1390. A large Jacobean monument, possibly by Samuel Baldwin, is to the memory of Sir Thomas Russell, who died in 1632, and his wife who died in 1618; it includes painted and gilded effigies under an arch. A Baroque wall monument to Sir Francis Russell, who died in 1705, and his wife, is by Edward Stanton. There is a monument to Samuel Butler, the poet and satirist who was born in the parish, and who died in 1680. The stained glass includes the east window of 1890 by Cox, Son and Buckly, depicting the Good Shepherd, a south chancel window of 1917 by Florence Camm depicting the Good Samaritan, and a window in the nave dating from 1903 depicting the Ascension by Curtis, Ward and Hughes. The simple organ in the west gallery was made by the Positive Organ Company of London. There is a ring of eight bells. Three of these were cast in 1704–05 by Abraham Rudhall I of Gloucester, and the others in 1911 and 1979 by John Taylor & Co of Loughborough.

== External features ==
In the churchyard is the base of a medieval cross which is designated as a Grade II listed building.

== See also ==
- List of churches preserved by the Churches Conservation Trust in the English Midlands
