= Leigh Court Barn =

Barn in Worcestershire, England

Coordinates: 52°10′45.7″N 2°19′4.6″W

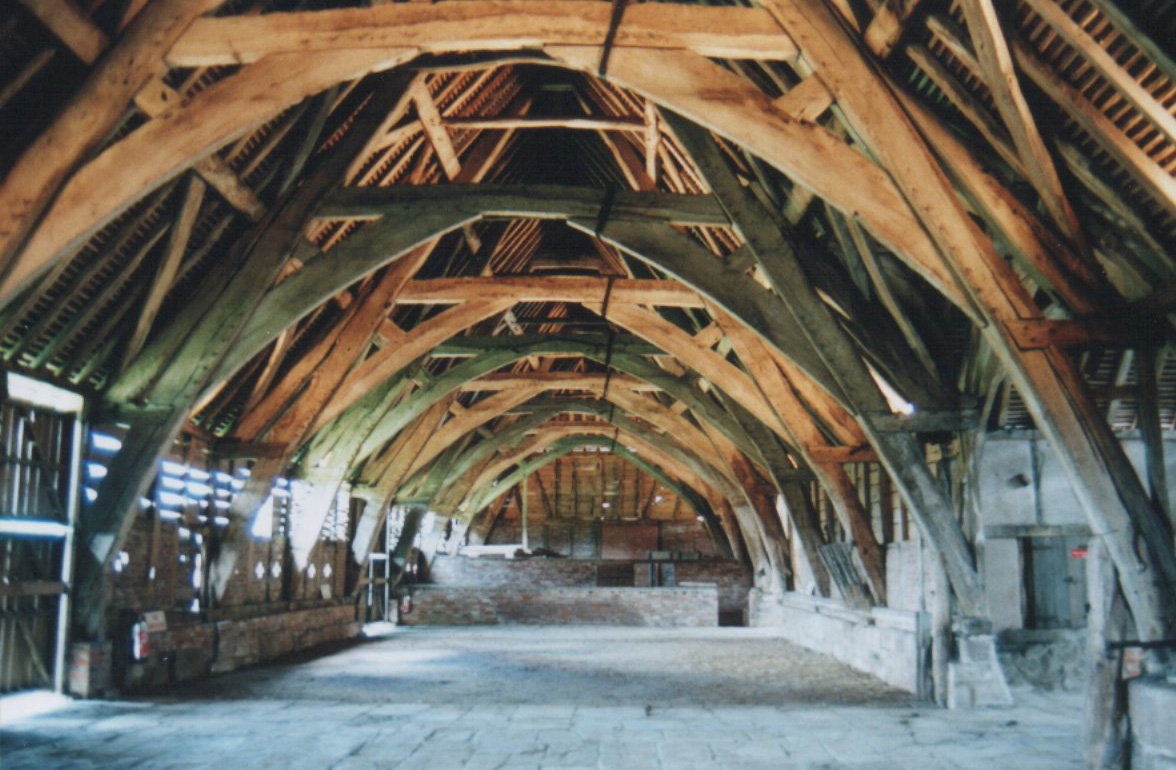
Cruck Framing: Leigh Court Tithe Barn, Worcester, England.

Leigh Court Barn is a cruck framed barn at Leigh, Worcestershire, England, built in the early fourteenth century to store produce for Pershore Abbey. It is the largest and one of the oldest cruck barns in Britain, measuring over 43 metres (141 feet) long, 11 metres (36 feet) wide and 9 metres (30 feet) high, supported by nine pairs of massive oak beams. Radiocarbon dating places its construction about 1325.
