= Cruck =

Curved timber used as roof support

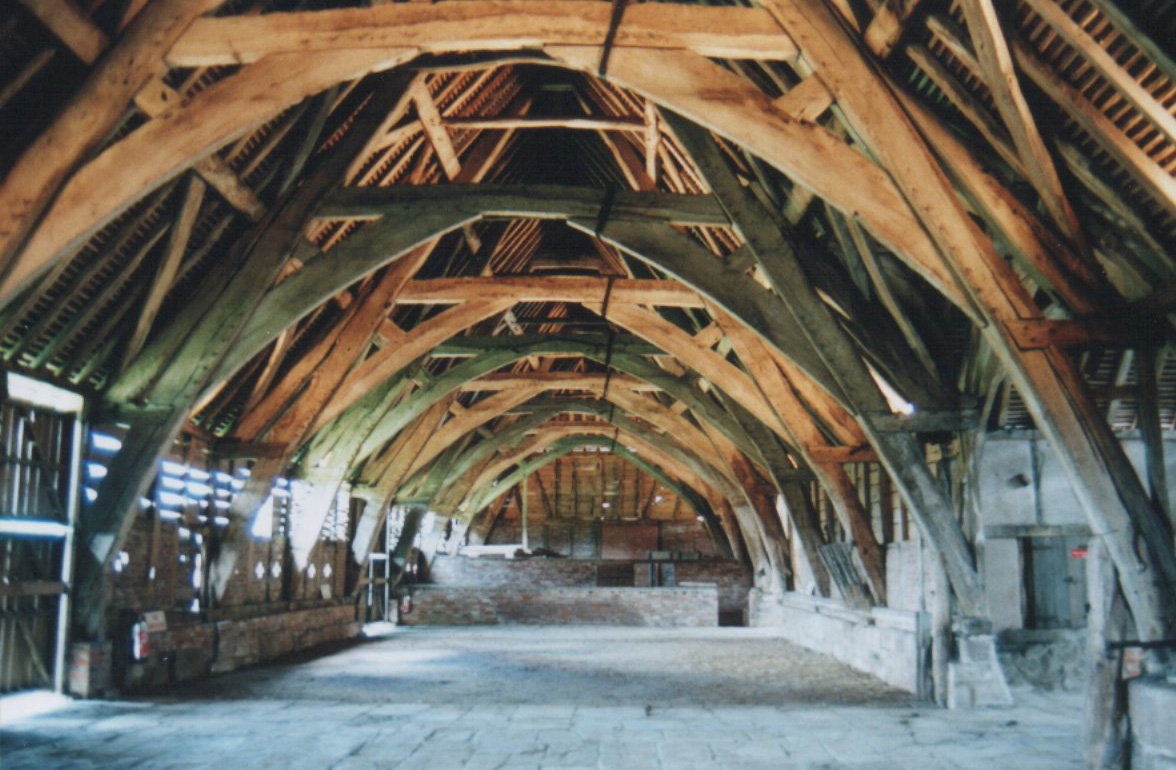
Cruck framing, Leigh Court Barn, Worcester, England

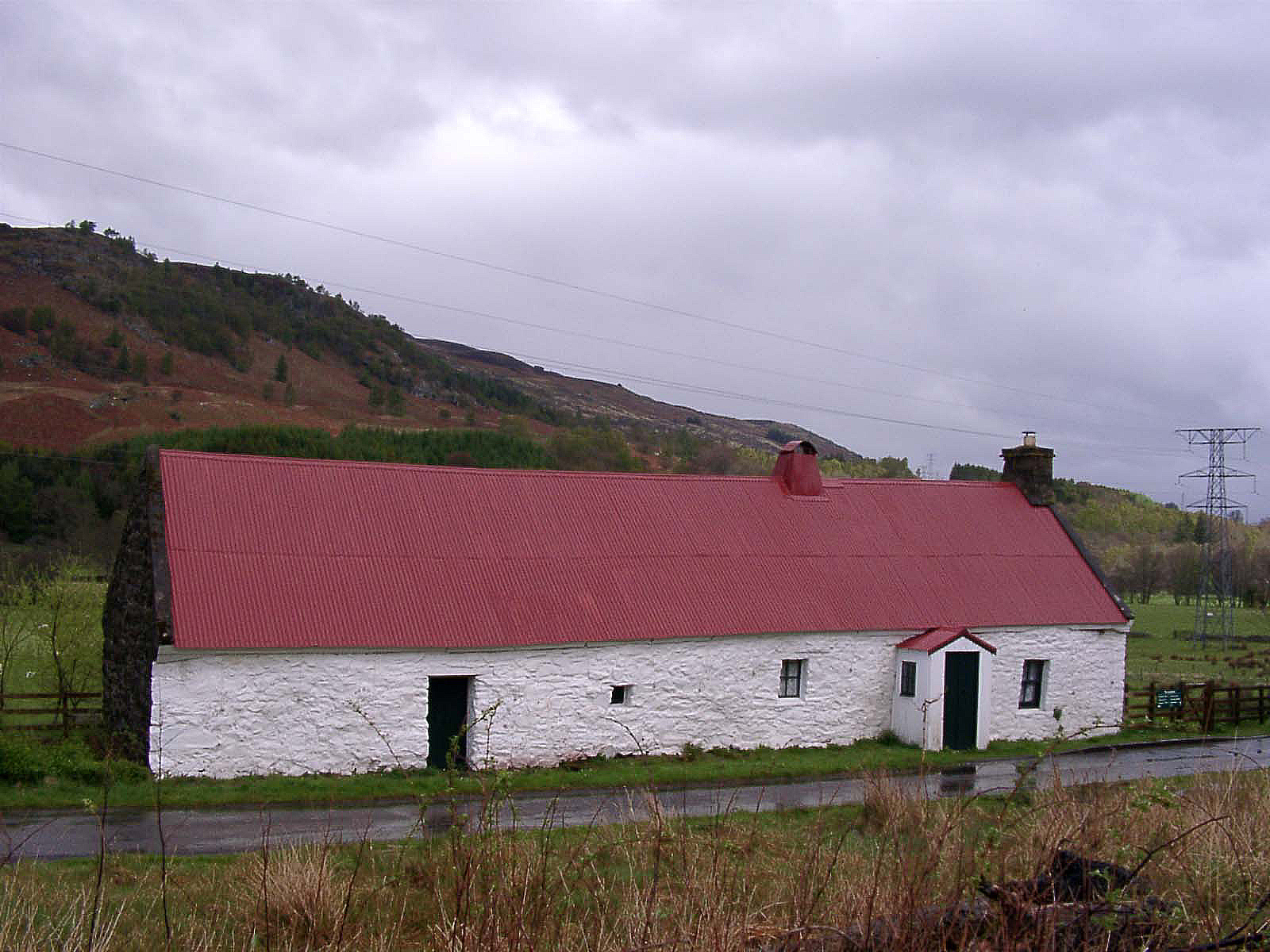
The Moirlanich Longhouse, a byre dwelling with a cruck frame

A cruck or crook frame is a curved timber, one of a pair, which supports the roof of a building, historically used in England and Wales. This type of timber framing consists of long, generally naturally curved, timber members that lean inwards and form the ridge of the roof. These posts are then generally secured by a horizontal beam which then forms an "A" shape. Several of these "crooks" are constructed on the ground and then lifted into position. They are then joined together by either solid walls or cross beams which aid in preventing 'racking' (the action of each individual frame going out of square with the rest of the frame, and thus risking collapse).

== Etymology ==
The term crook or cruck comes from Middle English crok(e), from Old Norse krāka, meaning "hook". This is also the origin of the word "crooked", meaning bent, twisted or deformed, and also the crook used by shepherds and symbolically by bishops.

== Use ==
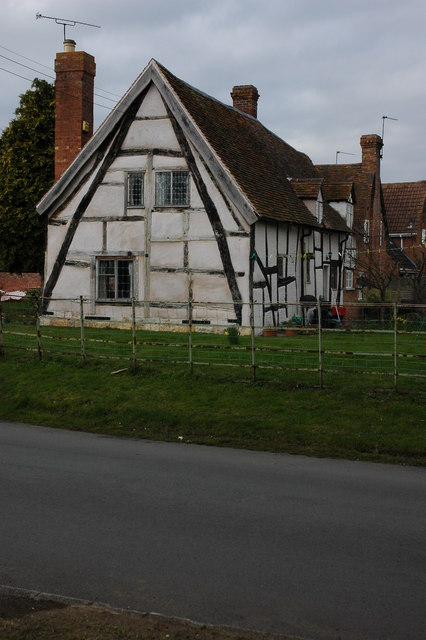
A half timbered house in Worcestershire framed with a full cruck

Crucks were chiefly used in the medieval period for structures such as houses and large tithe barns, which were entirely timber-framed. They were also often used for the roofs of stone-walled buildings such as churches. However, these bent timbers were comparatively rare, as they were also in high demand for the shipbuilding industry.

Where naturally curved timbers were convenient and available, carpenters continued to use them at much later dates. For instance, base crucks are found in the roofs of the residential range of Staple Inn Buildings, Nos. 337 – 338, High Holborn, London. This is dated by documented records to 1586, with significant alterations in 1886 (under Alfred Waterhouse) and further restorations in 1936, and 1954–55. Despite these changes Cecil Hewett, an authority on English Historic Carpentry, has stated that these 16th-century crucks are original.

The large main barn of the manor house Barlow Woodseats Hall features what is claimed to be the longest continuously roofed cruck barn in Derbyshire, and possibly even in the United Kingdom.

An example of a Yorkshire cruck barn complete with a heather-thatched roof can be found in Appletreewick. The crucks or cruck "blades" are a single oak tree riven (split) in two to form an equally shaped A frame.

Rare examples of cruck framing are found on continental Europe such as in Belgium, Flanders, Northern France and the Corrèze region of France. No cruck frames are known to have been built in North America though there are rare examples of what may be an upper cruck or knee rafters.

== History ==
The oldest surviving crucks with dates confirmed by tree ring analysis date from around the middle of the 13th century. They may have declined due to providing an inconveniently shaped space in cases where an upper floor was used.

=== Revival ===
During the current revival of green-oak framing for new building work, which has occurred mainly since approximately 1980 in the UK, genuine cruck frames have quite often been included in traditionally carpentered structures.

There are also some historically authentic reconstructions. For instance, Tithe Barn, Pilton, Glastonbury, whose original roof was destroyed by lightning, has been carefully rebuilt in 2005 from curved oaks. The necessary trees were sought out, using special templates, in English woodlands.

== Types ==
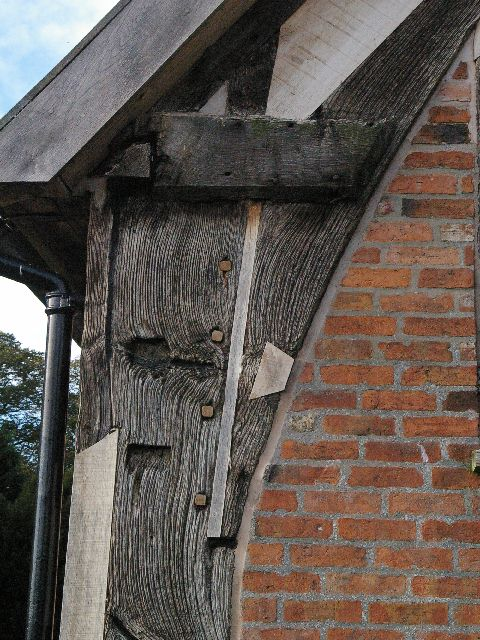
A jointed cruck

1. True cruck or full cruck: The blades, straight or curved, extend from a foundation near the ground to the ridge. A full cruck does not need a tie beam and may be called a "full cruck - open" or with a tie beam a "full cruck - closed".
2. Base cruck: The tops of the blades are truncated by the first transverse member such as by a tie beam.
3. Raised cruck: The blades land on masonry wall and extend to ridge.
4. Middle cruck: The blades land on masonry wall and are truncated by collar beam.
5. Upper cruck: The blades land on tie beam, very similar to knee rafters.
6. Jointed cruck: The blades made from two pieces joined near eaves. They can be joined in at least five ways.

The apex of a cruck frame also helps to define the style and region of the cruck. Different types include the butt apex, halved, housed, yoke, and crossed forms.

== See also ==
- Hammerbeam roof
- Vernacular architecture
- English vernacular architecture
