= Bredon Barn =

14th-century barn in Bredon, Worcestershire, England

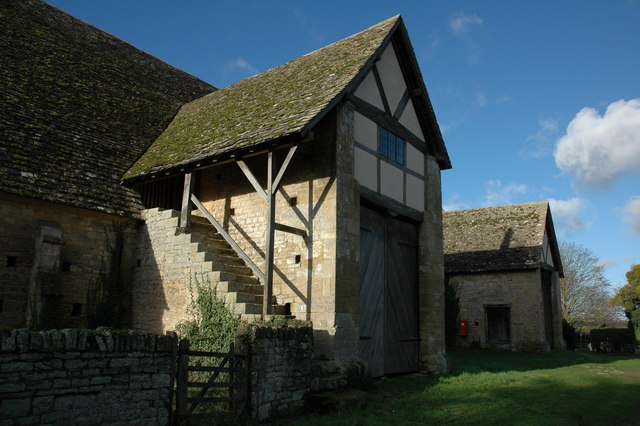
- Exterior of Bredon Barn

- Location within Worcestershire

General information
- Location: Bredon grid reference SO932368, United Kingdom
- Coordinates: 52.030°N 2.117°W
- Construction started: c. 14th Century A. D.

Website
- http://www.nationaltrust.org.uk/bredon-barn

Scheduled monument
- Reference no.: 1005291

Listed Building – Grade I
- Designated: 11 February 1965
- Reference no.: 1319631

Bredon Barn is a large 14th-century threshing barn located at Bredon, Worcestershire, England, standing close to the River Avon.

The barn was built for the Bishops of Worcester, who were the lords of the manor, from local Cotswold stone, measuring approximately 40 by 12 metres (131 by 39 ft). It has a steep pitched roof covered in Cotswold limestone tiles. The interior of the barn is divided into 9 bays by oak posts on stone plinths forming aisles, and carrying the open timber roof.

The barn was donated to the National Trust in 1951. It was badly damaged by fire in 1979, but was fully restored in 1983. It is a scheduled monument and Grade I listed building.
