= Bredon =

Village in Worcestershire, England

Coordinates: 52.030°N 2.117°W

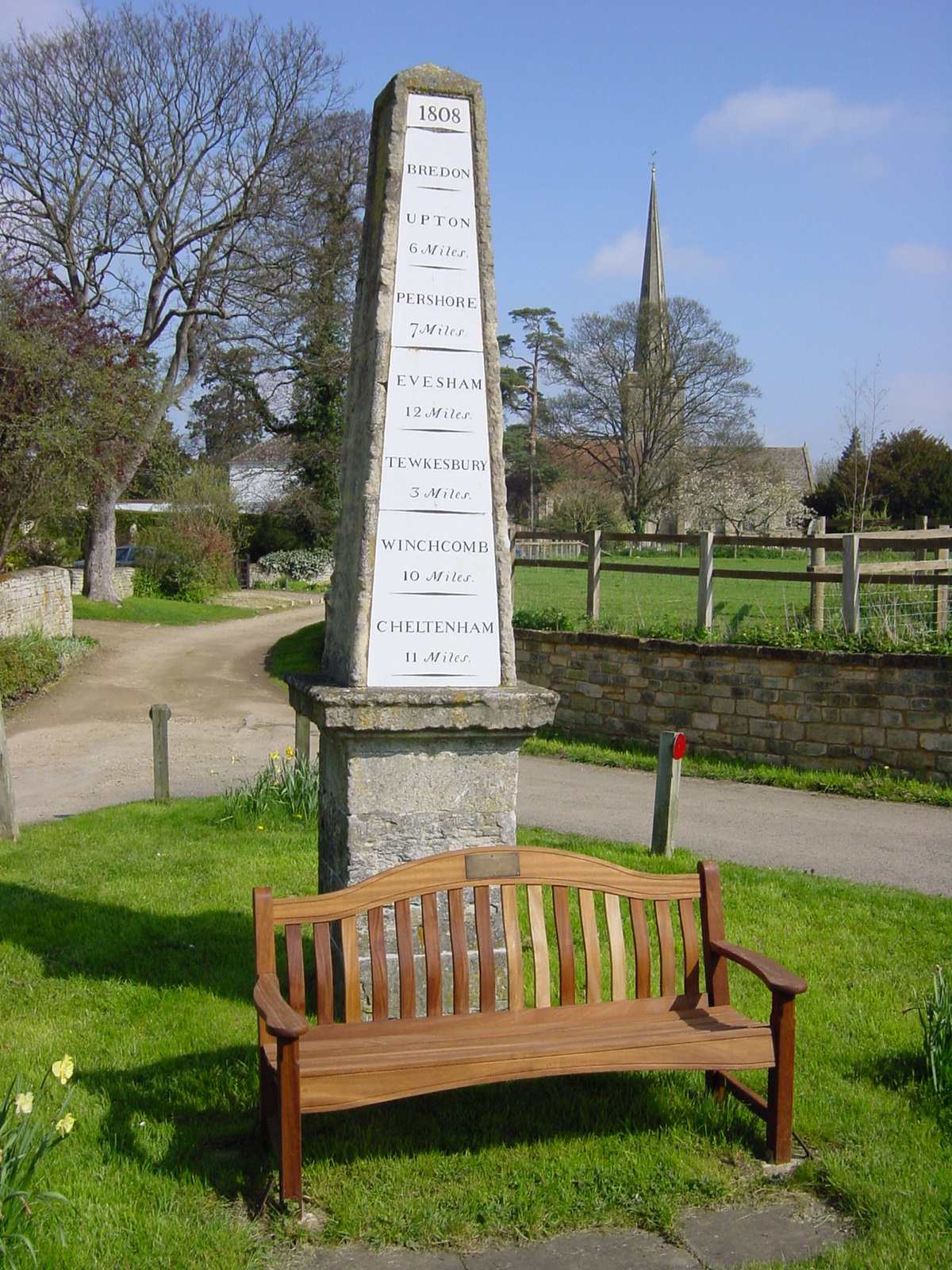
- The milestone obelisk in Bredon, with the parish church of St Giles in the background.

- Location within Worcestershire
- Population: 2,705
- OS grid reference: SO925369
  - London: 93 miles (150 km)
- Civil parish: Bredon
- District: Wychavon
- Shire county: Worcestershire
- Region: West Midlands
- Country: England
- Sovereign state: United Kingdom
- Post town: Tewkesbury
- Postcode district: GL20
- Dialling code: 01684
- Police: West Mercia
- Fire: Hereford and Worcester
- Ambulance: West Midlands
- UK Parliament: West Worcestershire
- Website: https://www.bredonpc.org.uk/

Bredon is a village and civil parish in Wychavon district at the southern edge of Worcestershire in England. It lies on the banks of the River Avon on the lower slopes of Bredon Hill.

== Location and geography ==
Bredon is located three miles (4.8 km) northwest of the Gloucestershire town of Tewkesbury on the B4080 road. The River Avon forms the western boundary of the parish, and two of its tributaries, the Carrant Brook and Squitter Brook form the southern boundary.

The parish extends from the Avon valley floor at an elevation of 32 feet (9.8 m) in the south-west to the upper slopes of Bredon Hill at an elevation of 820 feet (250 m) in the north-east. The northern third of the parish falls within the Cotswolds AONB. At its greatest extent, the parish measures approximately 4.8 miles (7.7 km) long by 2.2 miles (3.5 km) wide and covers around 4,119 acres (16.67 km^{2}).

== Population ==
Bredon parish includes the hamlets of Bredon's Hardwick, Kinsham and Westmancote. At the 2021 census the parish had a population of 2,705.

== Etymology ==
The name Bredon is first attested in charters from 775 and 780 which survive in eleventh-century copies, in the forms Breodun and Breadun. The settlement takes its name from the nearby hill now known as Bredon Hill, which was evidently once simply called Bredon. The first element of the name derives from Brittonic *breɣ ('hill'). This word, whose literal meaning was presumably not understood by Old English–speakers, was borrowed into Old English as a name for the hill, with the addition for clarification of the Old English word dūn (also meaning 'hill').

== History ==
Bredon's history of farming and settlement goes back at least four thousand years. Archaeological remains establish that parts of the parish were settled early in the Bronze Age (2500–800 BC). There are numerous Iron Age (800 BC–100 AD) remains, some of which would have related to Kemerton Camp, a large univallate hillfort at the summit of Bredon Hill. The parish is also rich in remains from the Britto-Roman Period (43–410 AD), revealing a continuing history of settlement and farming.

Modern Bredon has its roots in the Anglo-Saxon period (c.500–1066), when in c.716 Æthelbald, King of Mercia, gave land to his kinsman Eanwulf the grandfather of Offa to found a monastery. For some time, the manor of Bredon continued under an abbot of its own, but by 844 it had become the property of the Bishop of Worcester. It remained part of the Worcester monastic estate until the Reformation.

From the Norman Conquest (1066) to the end of the Late Medieval Period (1500), the parish was governed under the feudal system. The manor was held by the Bishop of Worcester, who maintained a summer residence, park and fisheries on the site of the first monastery, and the medieval village developed around these church buildings. Following the Reformation in the 16th century, the manor passed to the Crown.

In 1718, wealthy resident William Hancock founded Bredon Hancock's Endowed Church of England First School. Bredon's Act of Inclosure was passed in 1811, and among those gaining large consolidated holdings were the lord of the manor, Rev. Richard Darke, and the rector, Rev. John Keysall.

The Birmingham and Gloucester Railway, one of the world's oldest main line railways, was constructed during the 1830s and 1840s through the village, with Bredon railway station opening in 1841. This remained in operation until 1965, when it was closed under the Beeching Axe. The station is currently closed on the Cross Country Route.

In February 1971, a new section of the M5 motorway was opened, cutting through the parish to the west of the village.

== Buildings ==
There are 43 listed buildings in the village, including St Giles's Church and Bredon Barn (both Grade I), and the Old Rectory (Grade II*); the remainder are Grade II. A further 41 buildings were formerly listed prior to the abolition of the Grade III category in 1970. As is the case in most Cotswold villages, a variety of architectural styles and materials are in evidence, but almost all historic buildings are at least partly built from Cotswold limestone, quarried on Bredon Hill. Timber-frame construction was used as a secondary material up until the mid-17th century (often not painted black and white until the 20th century).

The earliest surviving building in the village, the parish church of St Giles, is one of England's most admired churches. It is built largely in the Norman, Early English and Decorated styles. A substantial part of the nave, the north porch and the western tower arch date from the 12th century, with significant additions in the 13th and 14th centuries – the most visible being a tall, octagonal spire, dating from 1300 to 1350, made famous by the poet, John Masefield. A number of 14th century heraldic tiles are set in the sanctuary steps, showing the arms of England, France, Beauchamp of Powick, Beauchamp of Warwick, Mortimer, Berkeley and others. The church contains many interesting monuments, including several to members of the interrelated Reed, Copley and Parsons families.

To the west of the church is Bredon Barn, a late 14th century threshing barn (often incorrectly referred to as a tithe barn) measuring approximately 40 metres by 12 metres. It has an enormous steep pitched roof covered in Cotswold limestone tiles. Walls are of limestone rubble masonry, divided into nine bays by oak posts on stone plinths forming aisles and carrying the open timber roof. The barn was badly damaged by fire in 1980. Now restored, it is in the care of the National Trust.

== Natural history ==
Bredon and its surroundings are exceptionally rich in wildlife, boasting sites of international importance for their rare fauna. The parish contains parts of the Bredon Hill Special Area of Conservation; parts of three Sites of Special Scientific Interest; and parts of twelve Local Wildlife Sites (the best sites in Worcestershire not covered by national designations).

Bredon Hill has been recognised as the third most important site in the UK for dead-wood beetles and other invertebrates, a large proportion of which are in Bredon. The north of the parish is the richest area in Worcestershire for rare arable plants. Kemerton Lake Nature Reserve (half in the parish), managed by the Kemerton Conservation Trust, is the West Midlands Region's most important site for dragonflies, with 22 species recorded. It is also Worcestershire's most important site for jack snipe, and more than 170 other bird species have been recorded here. Purple milk-vetch, violet click beetle, barbastelle bat, lesser horseshoe bat, otter, polecat and great-crested newt are some of the other interesting species found in and around the village.

== Sport ==
Bredon is home to a number of amateur sports teams. Originally established in 1991, Bredon Star RFC is based in the village alongside Bredon Athletic Football Club. Bredon Cricket Club is based a short distance outside of the village, at the foot of Bredon Hill in Westmancote. As of 2025, ex-Worcestershire player, Charlie Morris is Director of Cricket.

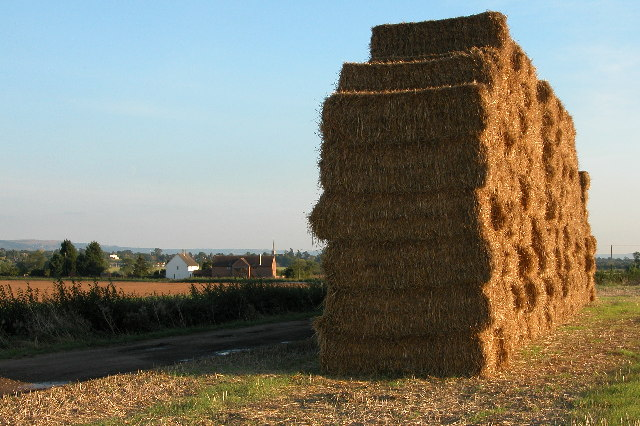
Farm in Bredon

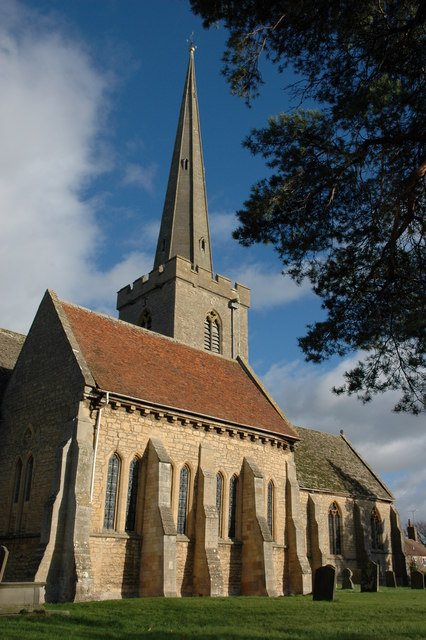
St Giles's Church, Church Street

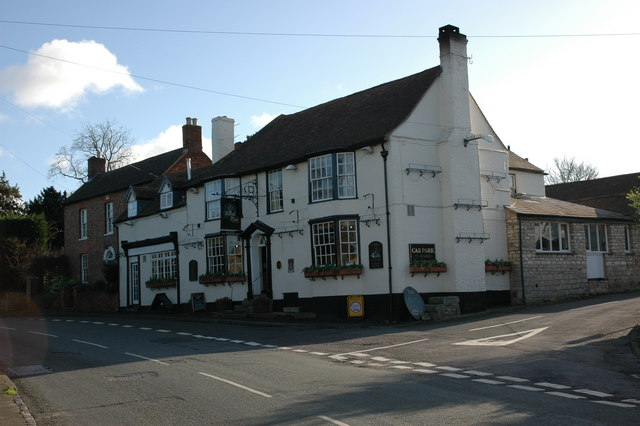
The Royal Oak pub, Main Road

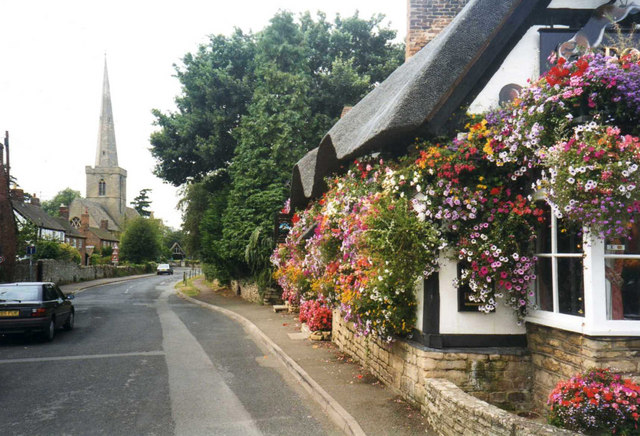
The Fox and Hounds pub, Church Street

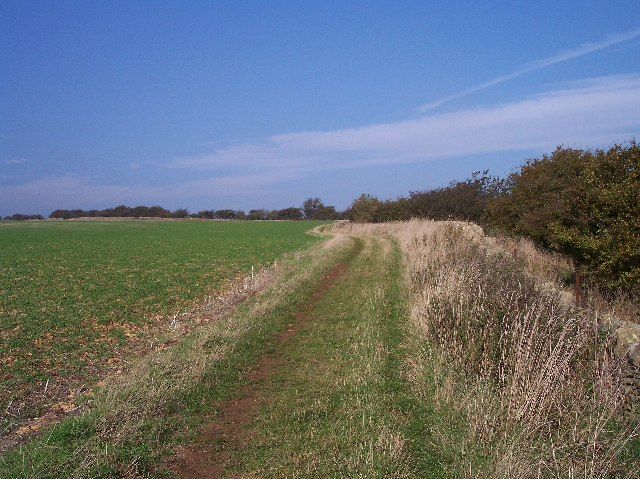
Wychavon Way on Bredon Hill

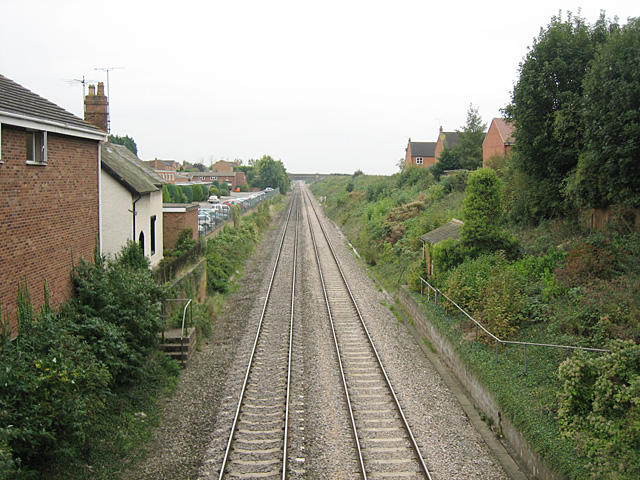
Bredon railway station (currently closed)

== See also ==
- List of civil parishes in Worcestershire
