= Church of St Peter and St Paul, Rock =

Church of St Peter and St Paul
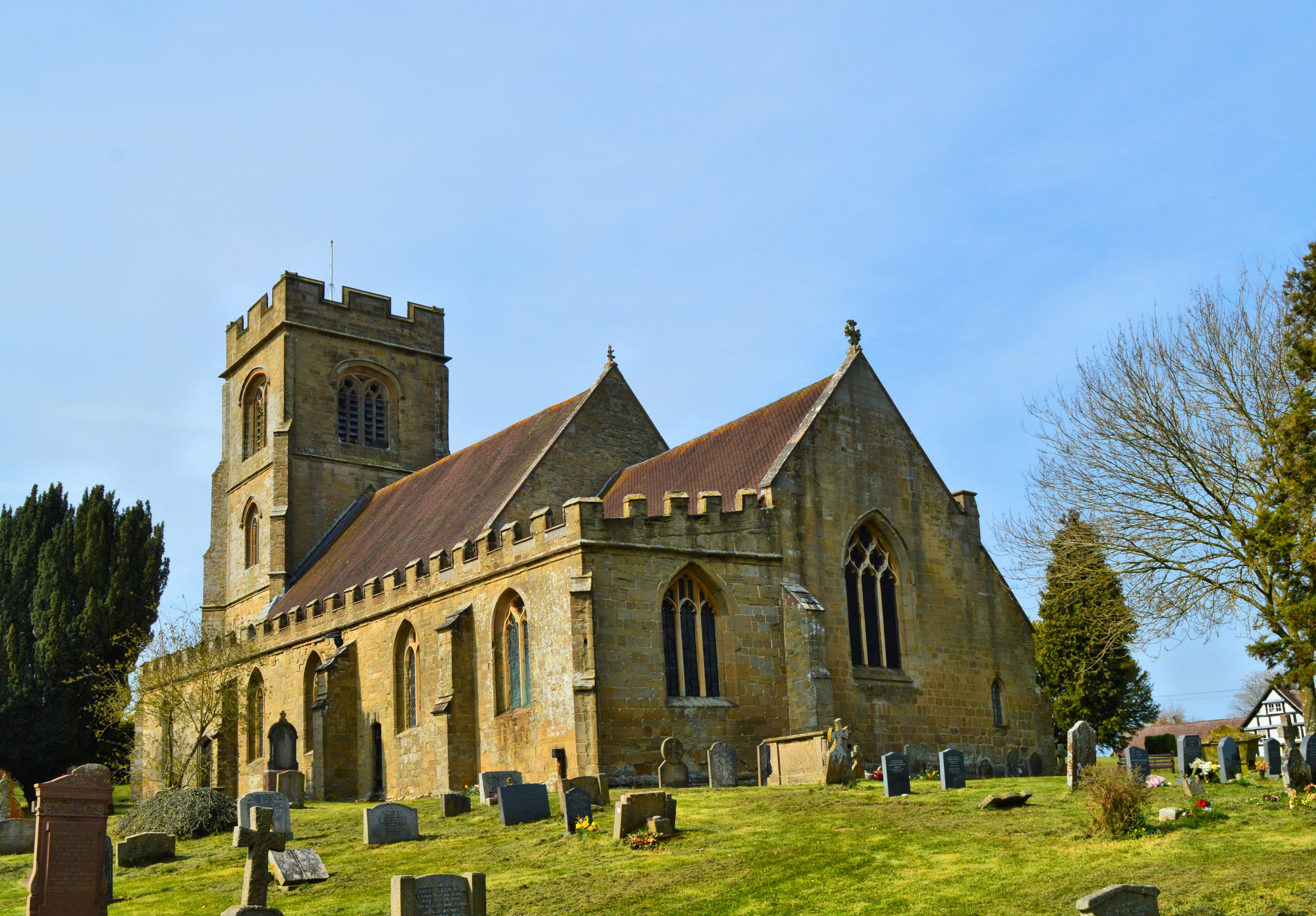
- Viewed from the south-east
- Church of St Peter and St Paul
- 52°20′16.4″N 2°23′43.5″W
- OS grid reference: SO 732 712
- Location: Rock, Worcestershire
- Country: England
- Denomination: Church of England

Architecture
- Heritage designation: Grade I
- Designated: 25 February 1958

Administration
- Diocese: Diocese of Worcester
- Parish: Rock with Heightington

The Church of St Peter and St Paul is an Anglican church in the village of Rock, in Worcestershire, England. It is in the parish of Rock with Heightington, in the Diocese of Worcester. The building is Grade I listed; the north door and chancel arch are notable features dating from the 12th century.

== History and description ==
The oldest parts of the church, the nave and the western part of the chancel, are 12th-century. The north wall is mostly in its original condition. The north door has a Norman arch of four orders, richly decorated with varieties of chevron patterns and embattled ornament.

The 12th-century chancel arch is elaborately decorated, having three orders on the nave side and two on the chancel side: there are varieties of chevron patterns; the capitals and abaci have ornaments of grotesque figures and foliage.

The font is 12th-century; the circular bowl has strapwork decoration. At the west end of the nave is an oak dug-out chest studded with nails, probably 13th-century.

=== 14th century ===
In the 14th century the chancel was extended and a small north vestry (more recently converted into a heating chamber) was added. The open-timber trussed chancel roof, and the similarly constructed nave roof, are probably of the 14th century.

=== 16th century and later ===
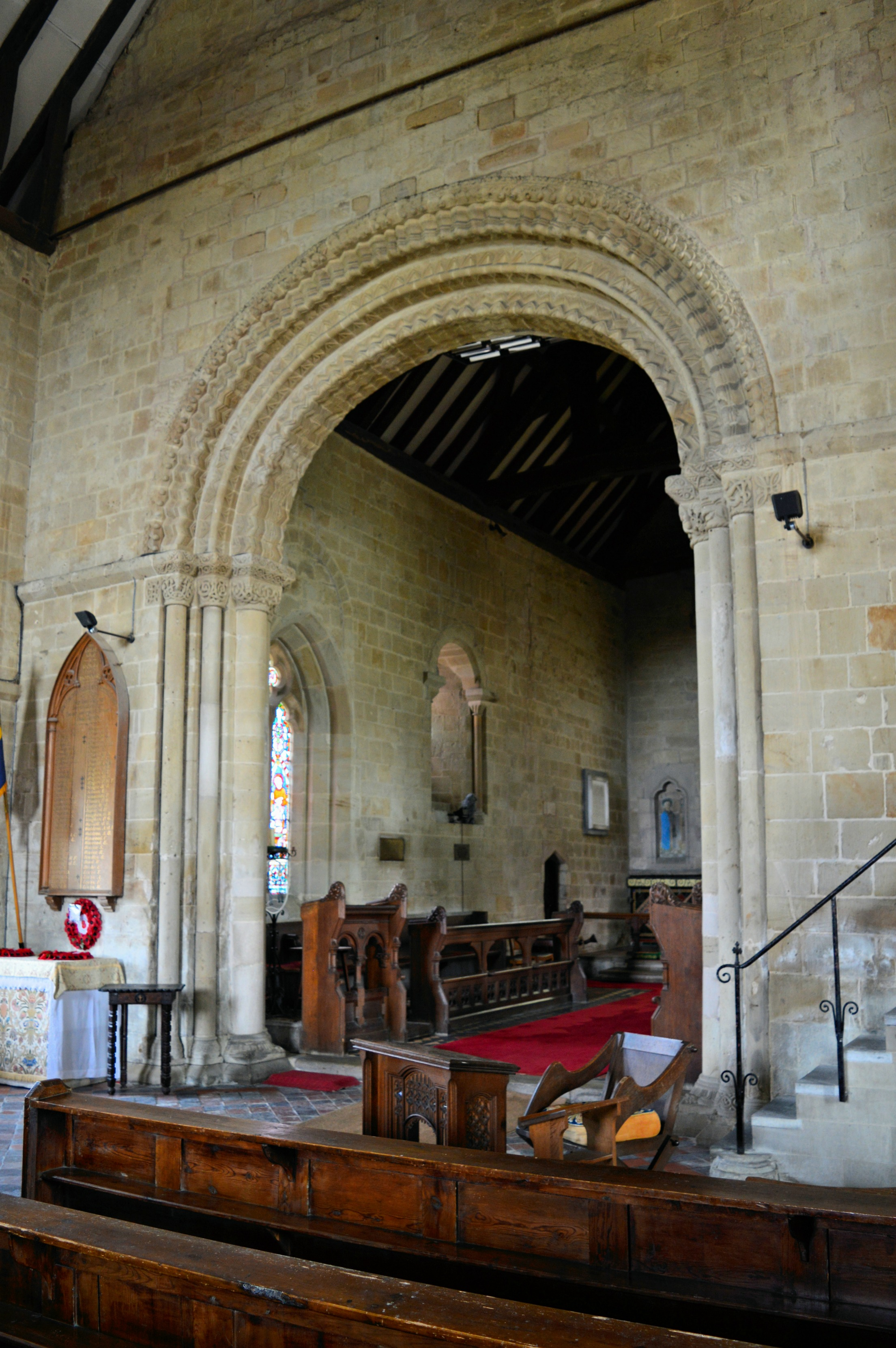
The chancel arch, seen from the nave

In 1510 Sir Humphrey Coningsby built the south chapel, the south aisle and the tower. The tower has three stages, diagonal buttresses and a parapet with battlements. There is a medieval altar slab in the south chapel.

The church was restored in 1861 by Frederick Preedy. The tower was restored in 1881.

== See also ==
- Rock moated site and medieval village
