= Rock, Worcestershire =

Village in Worcestershire, England

Coordinates: 52.338748°N 2.389441°W

Rock
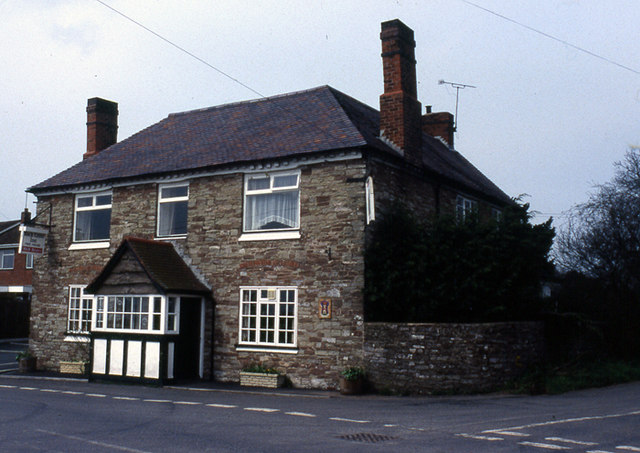
- The Rock Cross Inn, Rock

- Location within Worcestershire
- Population: 2,677 (2021)
- OS grid reference: SO735712
- Civil parish: Rock
- District: Wyre Forest
- Shire county: Worcestershire
- Region: West Midlands
- Country: England
- Sovereign state: United Kingdom
- Post town: KIDDERMINSTER
- Postcode district: DY14
- Police: West Mercia
- Fire: Hereford and Worcester
- Ambulance: West Midlands

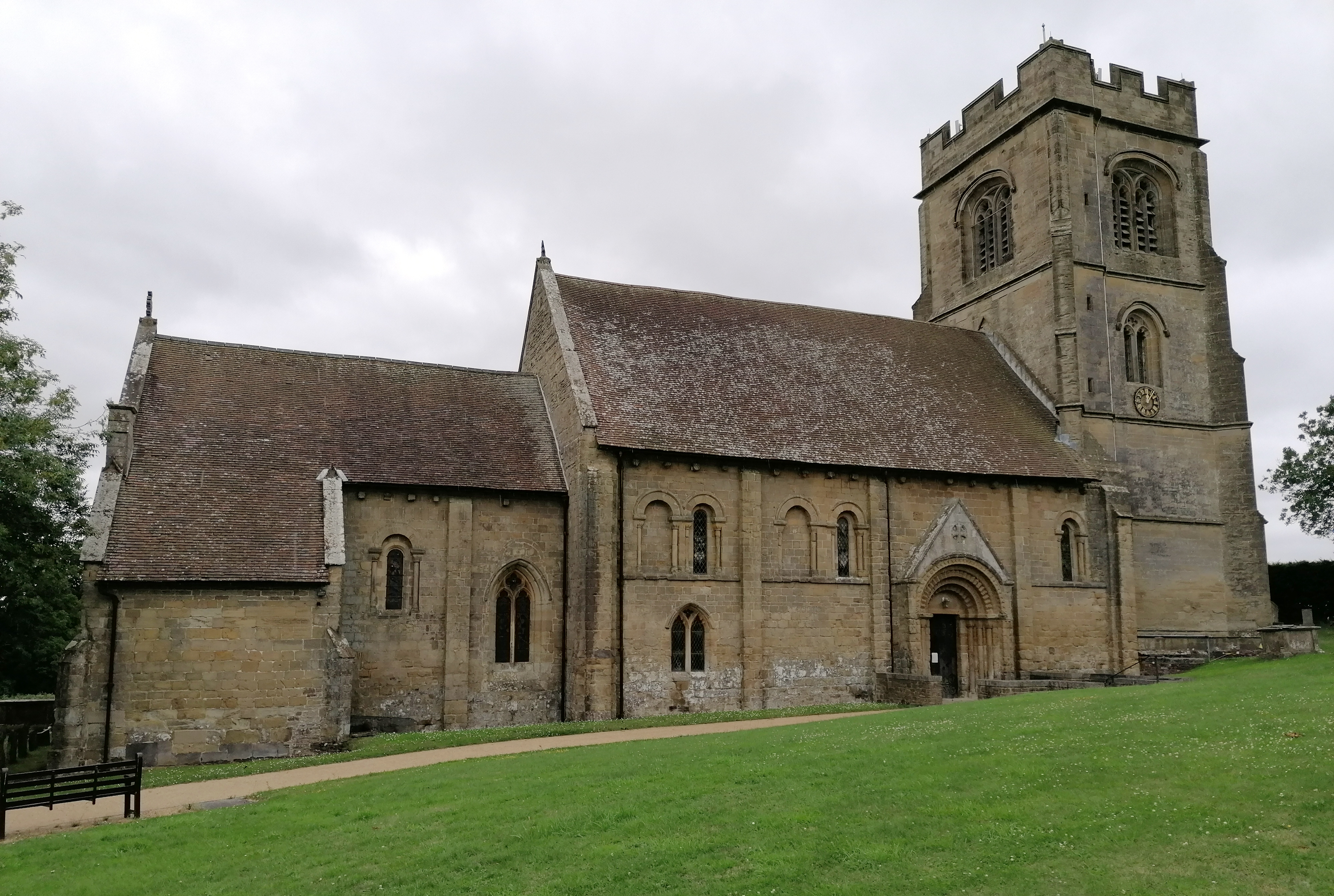
St Peter and St Paul's church, Rock

Rock is a village and civil parish in the Wyre Forest District of Worcestershire, England, which lies south-west of Bewdley. It had a population of 2,677 in 2021.

In the parish is Fingerpost, the junction of the A456 and A4117 roads. The parish council erected a large commemorative stone near the junction for the Diamond Jubilee of Queen Elizabeth II.

The Church of St Peter and St Paul contains a number of Herefordshire School Romanesque carvings. The local church has a major congregation, and the village hall always has local events taking place from wedding functions to the Rock Show.

The Bewdley School and Sixth Form Centre provides secondary education for pupils from the area.

== History ==
The name Rock derives from the Old English āc meaning 'oak'.

Rock was in the lower division of Doddingtree Hundred. It is a geographically large civil parish, embracing various settlements including Far Forest.

There is a moated site, and earthworks showing remains of a medieval village, near the church.

A grammar school was established in King Edward VI's reign.

Mary Whitehouse, the TV/radio clean-up campaigner and founder of Mediawatch UK, was reportedly living at Triangle Farm farmhouse in Rock just before moving to Essex in 1975.
