= Earl of Coventry =

Title in the Peerage of England

Earldom of Coventry
- Arms of Coventry: Sable, a fesse ermine, between three crescents or
- Creation date: 1623 (first creation); 1697 (second creation)
- Creation: Second
- Created by: James VI and I (first creation); William III (second creation)
- Peerage: Peerage of England
- First holder: George Villiers, 1st Duke of Buckingham, 1st Earl of Coventry (first creation)
- Present holder: George Coventry, 13th Earl of Coventry
- Heir presumptive: David Coventry
- Subsidiary titles: Viscount Deerhurst; Baron Coventry (extinct 1719)
- Extinction date: 1687 (first creation)
- Former seat: Croome Court
- Motto: Candide at constanter ("Candidly and constantly")

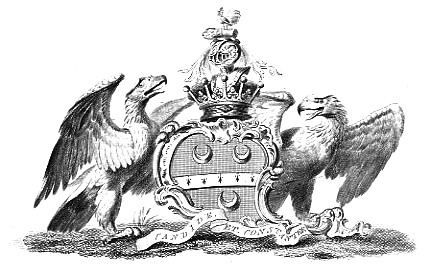
Heraldic achievement of the Coventry family, Earls of Coventry

Earl of Coventry is a title that has been created twice in the Peerage of England. The first creation for the Villiers family was created in 1623 and took its name from the city of Coventry. It became extinct in 1687. A decade later, the second creation was for the Coventry family and is still extant.

== History ==
=== Earls of Coventry, first creation (1623) ===
The earldom of Coventry was created for the first time in 1623, in the Peerage of England, in favour of George Villiers, 1st Marquess of Buckingham. He was made Duke of Buckingham at the same time. The title became extinct in 1687 upon the death of George Villiers, 2nd Duke of Buckingham.

=== Earls of Coventry, second creation (1697) ===
The earldom of Coventry was created a second time in 1697, again in the Peerage of England, in favour of Thomas Coventry, 5th Baron Coventry.

The Coventry family descends from John Coventry who served as Lord Mayor of London in 1426. His descendant Sir Thomas Coventry was a noted early 17th-century lawyer and politician. He served as Solicitor General, as Attorney General and as Lord Keeper of the Great Seal. In 1628 he was raised to the Peerage of England as Baron Coventry, of Aylesborough in the County of Worcester. He was succeeded by his son from his first marriage, the second Baron. He represented Droitwich and Worcester in the House of Commons.

His eldest son, the third Baron, served as Custos Rotulorum of Worcestershire. His son, the fourth Baron, died unmarried and was succeeded by his uncle, the fifth Baron. He sat as Member of Parliament for Droitwich, Camelford and Warwick. In 1697 he was made Viscount Deerhurst, of the hundred of Deerhurst in the County of Gloucester, and Earl of Coventry, with remainder, failing heirs male of his own, to 1) the heirs male of his deceased uncle the Hon. Francis Coventry (1612–1680), failing which to 2) his three second cousins William Coventry, Thomas Coventry and Henry Coventry, grandsons of his deceased great-uncle Walter Coventry (d. 1640), younger brother of the first Baron Coventry. The titles were in the Peerage of England.

He was succeeded by his eldest son, the second Earl. He was Custos Rotulorum of Worcestershire. His son, the third Earl, died as a child and was succeeded by his uncle, the fourth Earl. He had no sons and on his death in 1719 the barony of Coventry became extinct. He was succeeded in the viscountcy and earldom according to the special remainders by his second cousin once removed William Coventry, the fifth Earl. He was the grandson of Walter Coventry, youngest brother of the first Baron. Lord Coventry had earlier represented Bridport in Parliament and served as Lord Lieutenant of Worcestershire. He was succeeded by his second but eldest surviving son, the sixth Earl. He sat as Tory Member of Parliament for Bridport and for Worcestershire and served as Lord Lieutenant of Worcestershire.

Croome Court, the ancestral seat of the Coventry family

His son from his first marriage, the seventh Earl, was also Lord Lieutenant of Worcestershire. On his death, the titles passed to his eldest son, the eighth Earl. He represented Worcester in the House of Commons and served as Lord Lieutenant of Worcestershire. He was succeeded by his grandson, the ninth Earl, who held the title for 87 years. He was the son of George William Coventry, Viscount Deerhurst (1808–1838). Lord Coventry was a Conservative politician and held office under Benjamin Disraeli and Lord Salisbury as Captain of the Honourable Corps of Gentlemen-at-Arms and as Master of the Buckhounds. He was also Lord Lieutenant of Worcestershire. He was succeeded by his grandson, the tenth Earl, the son of George William Coventry, Viscount Deerhurst (1865–1927), eldest son of the ninth Earl. Lord Coventry was killed in action in the Battle of Wytschaete on 27 May 1940, during the retreat of the British Expeditionary Force to Dunkirk. He is buried in the cemetery at Givenchy-lès-la-Bassée.

He was succeeded by his only son, the eleventh Earl, who had a varied career. Despite four marriages, he died in 2002 without a surviving son, as his heir, Edward George William Oscar Coventry, Viscount Deerhurst (1957–1997) had died before him. He was succeeded by his 89-year-old first cousin once removed, the twelfth Earl, the second but eldest surviving son of Colonel the Hon. Charles John Coventry, second son of the ninth Earl. He had one daughter but no sons, and the direct male line of descent from the eighth Earl failed upon his death in 2004. He was succeeded by a distant kinsman, the thirteenth and (as of 2022) present holder of the titles. He is the great-great-grandson of the Hon. William James Coventry, the younger son of the seventh Earl. The new Lord Coventry then lived in Canada and now lives in Hampton, Greater London. He is one of the sons of Commander Cecil Dick Bluett Coventry and was educated at Prince of Wales School, Nairobi. In 1965, he married Gillian Frances Randall, by whom he has one daughter, Lady Diana Elizabeth Sherwood Coventry (born 1980).

The heir presumptive is a nephew, David Duncan Sherwood Coventry (born 1973).

== Other notable members of the family ==
Several other members of the Coventry family may be mentioned. The Hon. Henry Coventry (1618–1686), a son from the second marriage of the first Baron, was one of two Members of Parliament for Droitwich. Another son from the second marriage of the first Baron, Sir William Coventry (d. 1686), represented Great Yarmouth in the House of Commons and became an influential politician. Sir John Coventry (c. 1636–1685), son of the Hon. John Coventry, a son of the second marriage of the first Baron, sat as Member of Parliament for Weymouth and Melcombe Regis. Thomas Henry Coventry, Viscount Deerhurst (1721–1744), eldest son and heir apparent of the fifth Earl, briefly represented Bridport in Parliament before his premature death.

== Ancestral seat ==
The ancestral seat of the Coventry family is Croome Court, near Pershore in Worcestershire. Croome Court was sold in 1949 and the family moved to the smaller, half-timbered, somewhat confusingly named Earls Croome Court on the estate, while still retaining most of the 15,000 acres (61 km^{2}) Coventry agricultural and forestry estate. Earls Croome Court remained as the seat of the family until 2007, when it was sold by Rachel, Countess of Coventry, the widow of the 11th Earl who died in 2002. The park at Croome Court was handed over to the National Trust in 1996 but the house itself remains private and is now owned by the Croome Heritage Trust. The National Trust now leases the house and opens it to the public.

== List of title holders ==
=== Earls of Coventry, first creation (1623) ===
- George Villiers, 1st Duke of Buckingham, 1st Earl of Coventry (1592–1628)
- George Villiers, 2nd Duke of Buckingham, 2nd Earl of Coventry (1628–1687)

=== Earls of Coventry, second creation (1697) ===
==== Barons Coventry (1628) ====
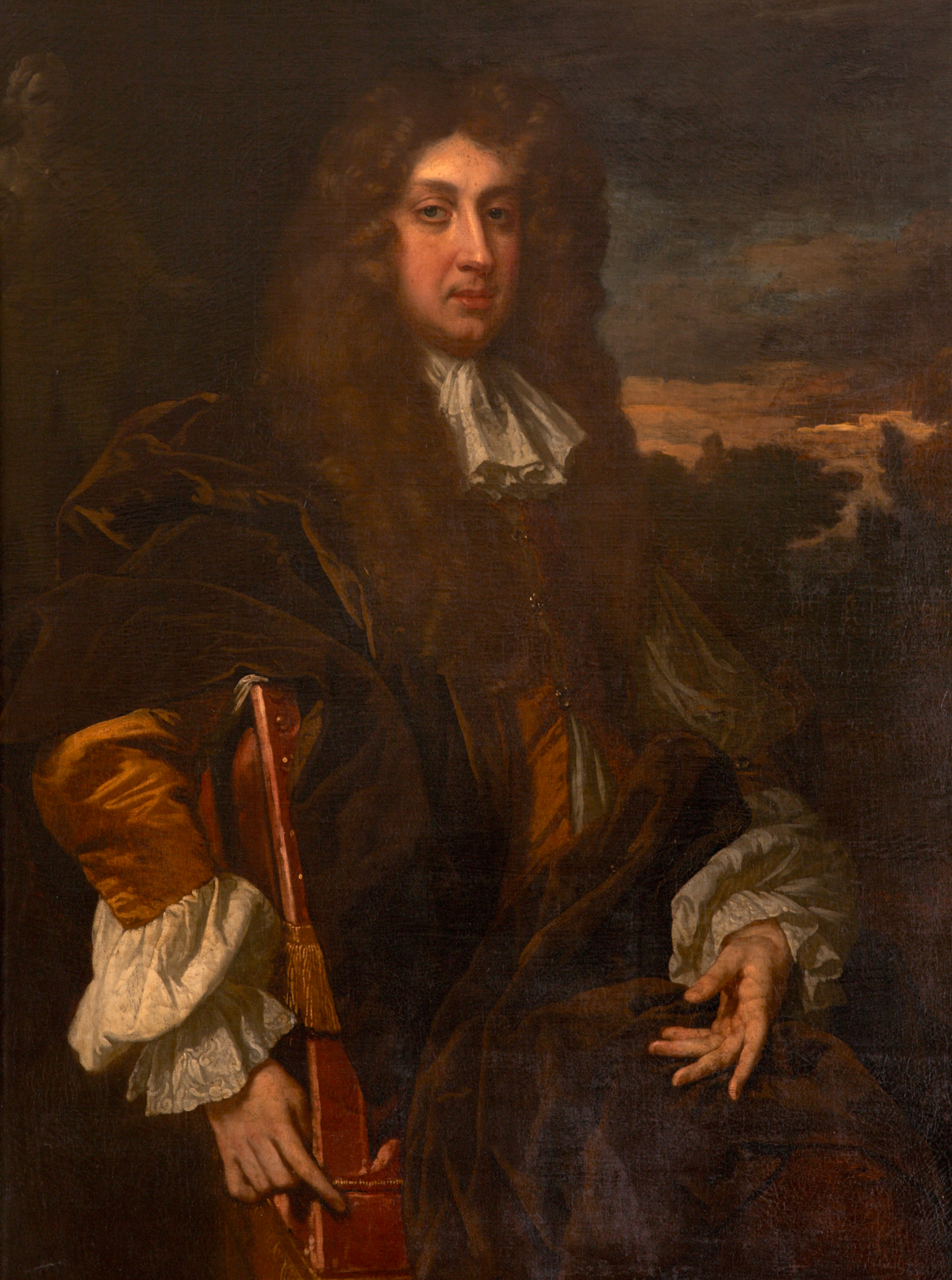
John Coventry, 4th Baron Coventry

- Thomas Coventry, 1st Baron Coventry (d. 1640)
- Thomas Coventry, 2nd Baron Coventry (1606–1661)
- George Coventry, 3rd Baron Coventry (d. 1680)
- John Coventry, 4th Baron Coventry (1654–1687)
- Thomas Coventry, 5th Baron Coventry (d. 1699) (created Earl of Coventry in 1697)

==== Earls of Coventry (1697) ====
- Thomas Coventry, 1st Earl of Coventry (c. 1629–1699)
- Thomas Coventry, 2nd Earl of Coventry (d. 1711), married Lady Anne Somerset)
- Thomas Coventry, 3rd Earl of Coventry (1702–1712), died at Eton aged 9
- Gilbert Coventry, 4th Earl of Coventry (d. 1719) (barony extinct), younger brother of second earl (married Anne Coventry).
- William Coventry, 5th Earl of Coventry (d. 1751)
- George William Coventry, 6th Earl of Coventry (1722–1809)
- George William Coventry, 7th Earl of Coventry (1758–1831)
- George William Coventry, 8th Earl of Coventry (1784–1843)
  - George William Coventry, Viscount Deerhurst (1808–1838)
- George William Coventry, 9th Earl of Coventry (1838–1930)
  - George William Coventry, Viscount Deerhurst (1865–1927)
- George William Reginald Victor Coventry, 10th Earl of Coventry (1900–1940)
- George William Coventry, 11th Earl of Coventry (1934–2002)
  - Edward George William Oscar Coventry, Viscount Deerhurst (1957–1997)
- Francis Henry Coventry, 12th Earl of Coventry (1912–2004), cousin of 11th Earl
- George William Coventry, 13th Earl of Coventry (b. 1939)

The heir presumptive is a nephew, David Duncan Sherwood Coventry (born 1973).

=== Line of succession ===
Line of succession (simplified)
- George Coventry, 6th Earl of Coventry (1722–1809)
  - George Coventry, 7th Earl of Coventry (1758–1831)
    - George Coventry, 8th Earl of Coventry (1784–1843)
      - George William Coventry, Viscount Deerhurst (1808–1838)
        - George Coventry, 9th Earl of Coventry (1838–1930)
          - George William Coventry, Viscount Deerhurst (1865–1927)
            - George Coventry, 10th Earl of Coventry (1900–1940)
              - George William Coventry, 11th Earl of Coventry (1934–2002)
          - Hon. Charles John Coventry (1867–1929)
            - Francis Coventry, 12th Earl of Coventry (1912–2004)
    - Hon. William James Coventry (1797–1877)
      - William George Coventry (1826–1874)
        - Gilbert William Coventry (1868–1947)
          - Cecil Dick Bluett Coventry (1905–1952)
            - George Coventry, 13th Earl of Coventry (b. 1939)
            - Peter Harold Sherwood Coventry (1941–1985)
              - (1). David Duncan Sherwood Coventry (b. 1973)
                - (2). Ted Peter Sherwood Coventry (b. 2010)
          - Arthur John Clifford Coventry (1909–1965)
            - (3). Gilbert John Henry Coventry (b. 1939)
              - (4). Wesley John Coventry (b. 1965)
            - (5). Richard William Coventry (b. 1953)
              - (6). Richard John Coventry (b. 1972)
      - Rev. Henry William Coventry (1829–1920)
        - Fulwar Cecil Ashton Coventry (1874–1944)
          - Digby Colquitt Coventry (1919–2014)
            - male issue and descendants in remainder
  - Hon. John Coventry (1765–1829)
    - Frederick Coventry (1791–1859)
      - Henry Halford Coventry (1834–1914)
        - Harry Coventry (1858–1943)
          - St. John Coventry (1901–1963)
            - Henry John Coventry (1932–2006)
              - male issue and descendants in remainder
            - Roger Michael Coventry (1934–2023)
              - male issue and descendants in remainder
    - John Coventry (1793–?)
      - John Coventry (1819–1897)
        - John Coventry (1845–1933)
          - Bernard Seton Coventry (1887–1965)
            - Anthony James Seton Coventry (1913–1955)
              - male issue in remainder
  - Hon. Thomas William Coventry (1778–1816)
    - Thomas William Coventry (1800–1882)
      - Gilbert Walter Coventry (1837–1909)
        - Francis Gilbert Coventry (1892–1960)
          - male issue and descendants in remainder
        - Arthur Roger Coventry (1894–1975)
          - male issue and descendants in remainder
