= Countess of Coventry =

Countess of Coventry may refer to:

- Anne Coventry, Countess of Coventry (1691–1788)
- Anne Coventry, Countess of Coventry (1673–1763)
- Maria Coventry, Countess of Coventry (1733–1760)
