= Anne Coventry, Countess of Coventry =

Anne Coventry, Countess of Coventry may refer to:

- Anne Coventry, Countess of Coventry (1673–1763), British religious writer
- Anne Coventry, Countess of Coventry (1691–1788), litigant over her inheritance
