= Anne, Countess of Coventry =

Anne, Countess of Coventry may refer to:

- Anne Coventry, Countess of Coventry (1691–1788)
- Anne Coventry, Countess of Coventry (1673–1763)
