= Thomas Coventry, 1st Baron Coventry =

English politician

The Right Honourable The Lord Coventry PC
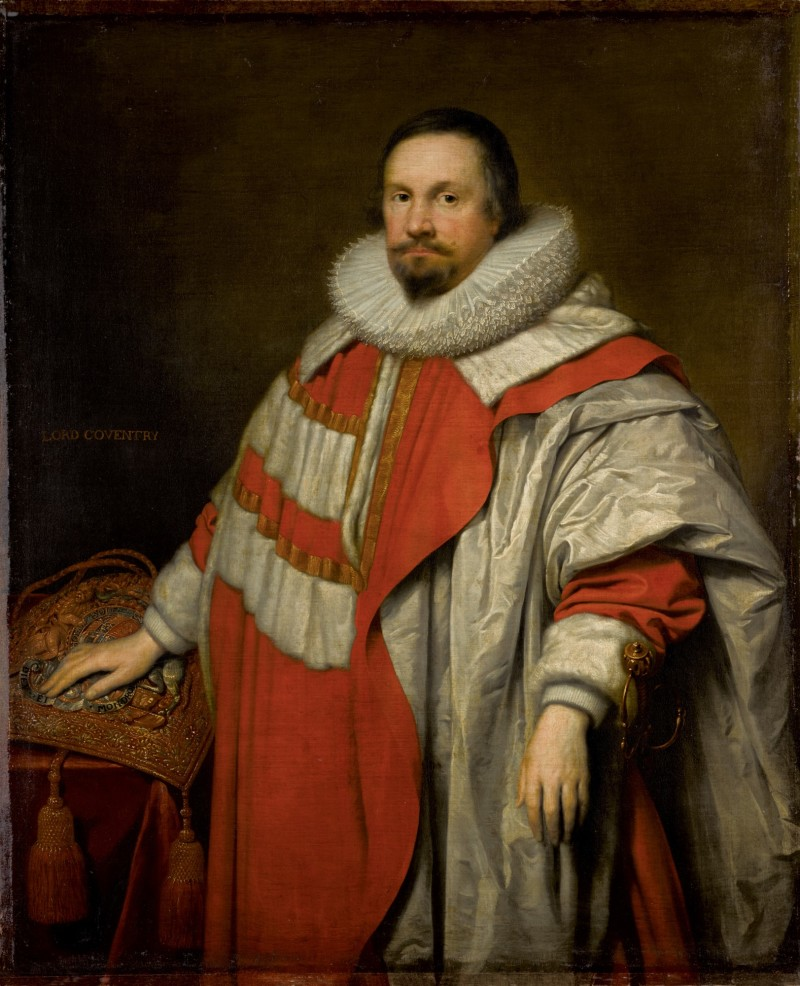

Lord Keeper of the Great Seal of England
- In office 1625–1640
- Monarch: Charles I
- Preceded by: John Williams
- Succeeded by: The Lord Finch

Personal details
- Born: 1578
- Died: 14 January 1640 (aged 61)

Thomas Coventry, 1st Baron Coventry (1578 – 14 January 1640) was a prominent English lawyer, politician and judge during the early 17th century.

== Education and early legal career ==
He entered Balliol College, Oxford, in 1592, and the Inner Temple in 1594, becoming bencher of the society in 1614, reader in 1616, and holding the office of treasurer from 1617 till 1621. His exceptional legal abilities were rewarded early with official promotion. On 16 November 1616 he was made Recorder of London in spite of Francis Bacon's opposition, who, although allowing him to be "a well trained and an honest man", objected that he was "bred by my Lord Coke and seasoned in his ways". On 14 March 1617 he was appointed Solicitor General and was knighted.

== Political and judicial career ==
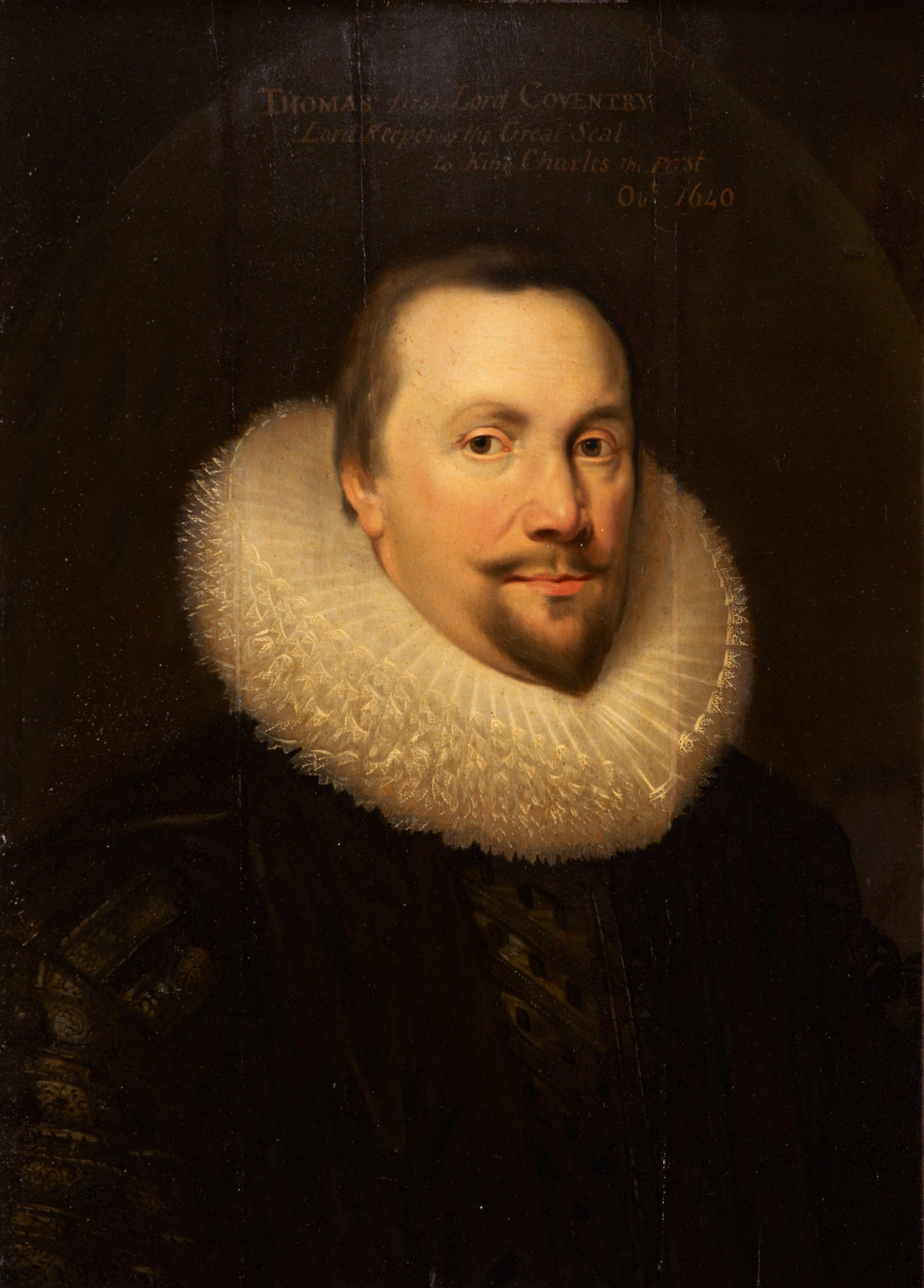
Thomas Coventry was made Lord Keeper of the Great Seal on 1 November 1625.

He was returned for Droitwich to the Parliament of 1621; and on 11 January in that year was made Attorney General. He took part in the proceedings against Bacon for corruption, and was manager for the House of Commons in the impeachment of Edward Floyd for insulting the elector and electress palatine.

On 1 November 1625 he was made Lord Keeper of the Great Seal; in this capacity, he delivered Charles I's reprimand to the Commons on 9 March 1626, when he declared that "liberty of counsel" alone belonged to them and not "liberty of control". On 10 April 1628 he received the title of Baron Coventry of Aylesborough in Worcestershire. At the opening of parliament in 1628, he threatened that the king would use his prerogative if further thwarted in the matter of supplies. In the subsequent debates, however, while strongly supporting the king's prerogative against the claims of the parliament to executive power, he favoured a policy of moderation and compromise. He defended the right of the council in special circumstances to commit people to prison without showing cause, and to issue general warrants. He disapproved of the king's sudden dissolution of parliament, and agreed to the liberation on bail of the seven imprisoned members on condition of their giving security for their good behaviour.

He showed less subservience than Bacon to the Duke of Buckingham, and his resistance to the latter's pretensions to the office of Lord High Constable greatly incensed the duke. Buckingham taunted Coventry with having gained his place by his favour; Coventry replied, "Did I conceive I had my place by your favour, I would presently unmake myself by returning the seal to his Majesty". After this defiance, Buckingham's sudden death alone probably prevented Coventry's displacement.

He passed sentence of death on Lord Audley in 1631, drafted and enforced the proclamation of 20 June 1632 ordering the country gentlemen to leave London, and in 1634 joined in William Laud's attack on the Earl of Portland for peculation. The same year, in an address to the judges, he supported the proposed levy of ship money on the inland as well as the maritime counties on the plea of the necessity of effectually arming, "so that they might not be enforced to fight", "the wooden walls" being in his opinion "the best walls of this kingdom". He voted in Star Chamber in 1633 to remove the Irish judge Lord Sarsfield from office for corruption, censuring him severely for hearing a murder case in private and for bullying the jury into returning a guilty verdict.

In the Star Chamber Coventry was one of John Lilburne's judges in 1637, but he generally showed conspicuous moderation, inclining to leniency in the cases of Richard Chambers in 1629 for seditious speeches, and of Henry Sherfield in 1632 for breaking painted glass in a church. He prevented also the hanging of men for resistance to impressment, and pointed out its illegality, since the men were not subject to martial law. While contributing thirty horse to the Scottish expedition in 1638, and lending the king £10,000 in 1639, he gave no support to the forced loan levied upon the city in the latter year.

== Summary ==
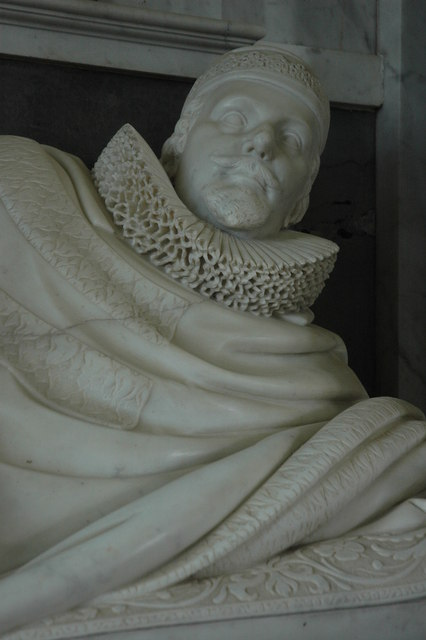
Thomas Coventry (effigy pictured) was remembered by Edward Hyde as "rather exceedingly liked than passionately loved".

Lord Coventry held the great seal for nearly fifteen years (1625–40), and was enabled to collect a large fortune. He was an able judge, and he issued some important orders in chancery, probably alluded to by Wood, who ascribes to him a tract on "The Fees of all law Officers". Bulstrode Whitelocke accuses him of mediocrity, but his contemporaries in general have united in extolling his judicial ability, his quick despatch of business and his sound and sterling character. Clarendon in particular praises his statesmanship, and compares his capacity with Lord Strafford's, adding, however, that he seldom spoke in the council except on legal business and had little influence in political affairs; to the latter circumstance, he owed his exceptional popularity. He describes him as having "in the plain way of speaking and delivery a strange power of making himself believed", as a man of "not only firm gravity but a severity and even some morosity", as "rather exceedingly liked than passionately loved".

== Family ==
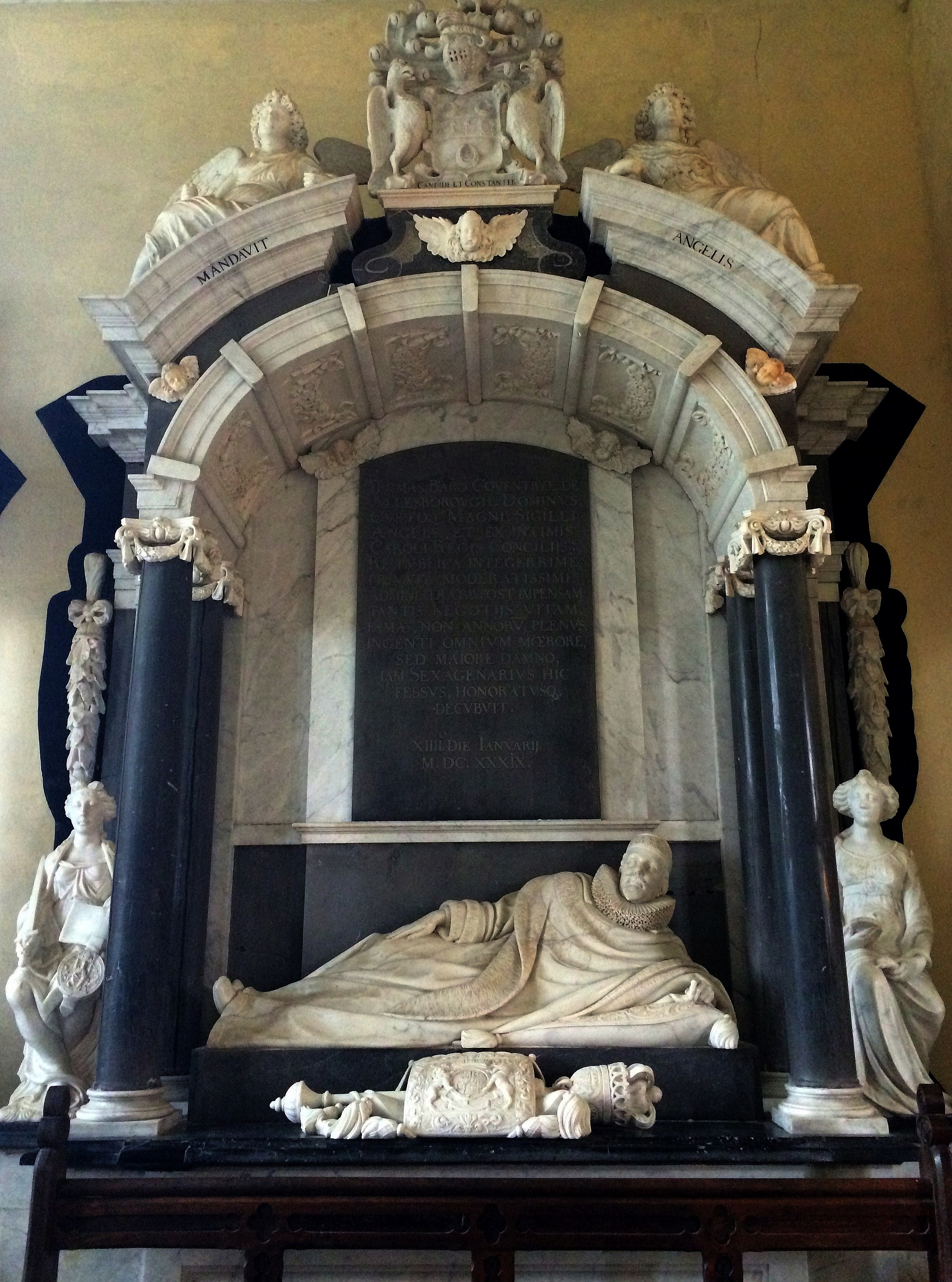
Monument to the 1st Lord Coventry in the church at Croome Court

Lord Coventry was the eldest son of Sir Thomas Coventry, judge of the common pleas (a descendant of John Coventry, Lord Mayor of the City of London in the reign of Henry VI), and of Margaret Jeffreys of Earls Croome, or Croome D'Abitot, in Worcestershire.

He married:

1. Sarah, (sister of Sir Edward Sebright of Besford in Worcestershire, and daughter of John Sebright by Anne Bullingham), by whom he had a son and a daughter:

- Thomas, who succeeded him as 2nd baron,
- Elizabeth (d. 1644) married Sir John Hare of Stow Bardolph, Norfolk.

2. Elizabeth, daughter of John Aldersley of Spurstow, Cheshire, and widow of William Pitchford, by whom he had four more sons and four more daughters:

- John, father of Sir John Coventry
- Francis,
- Henry, Secretary of State (1672–1680) and
- Sir William Coventry, the statesman;
- Anne married Sir William Savile, 3rd baronet (1629) and then Thomas Chicheley of Wimpole (1645)
- Mary married Sir Henry Frederick Thynne, 1st Baronet
- Margaret married Sir Anthony Ashley-Cooper, later Earl of Shaftesbury
- Dorothy married Sir John Pakington, 2nd Baronet.

Thomas Coventry, 5th baron (died 1699), was created Earl of Coventry in 1697 with a special limitation, on the failure of his own male issue, to that of Walter, youngest brother of the lord keeper, from whom the present earl of Coventry is descended.

Parliament of England
Preceded by Edwyn Sandys; Ralph Clare	MP for Droitwich; 1621–1624 with John Wilde	Succeeded by Walter Blount; John Wilde
Political offices
Preceded by Sir Henry Yelverton	Solicitor General for England and Wales; 1617–1621	Succeeded by Sir Robert Heath
Preceded by Sir Henry Yelverton	Attorney General for England and Wales; 1621–1625	Succeeded by Sir Robert Heath
Preceded by John Williams	Lord Keeper; 1625–1640	Succeeded by The Lord Finch
Honorary titles
Preceded by Sir John Pakington, 1st Baronet	Custos Rotulorum of Worcestershire; 1624–1628	Succeeded by The Lord Coventry
Preceded by Sir John Bridgeman	Custos Rotulorum of Gloucestershire; 1638–1640	Vacant
Peerage of England
New title New creation	Baron Coventry; 1628–1640	Succeeded by Thomas Coventry
