= St Mary Magdalene's Church, Croome D'Abitot =

Coordinates: 52.1035°N 2.1672°W

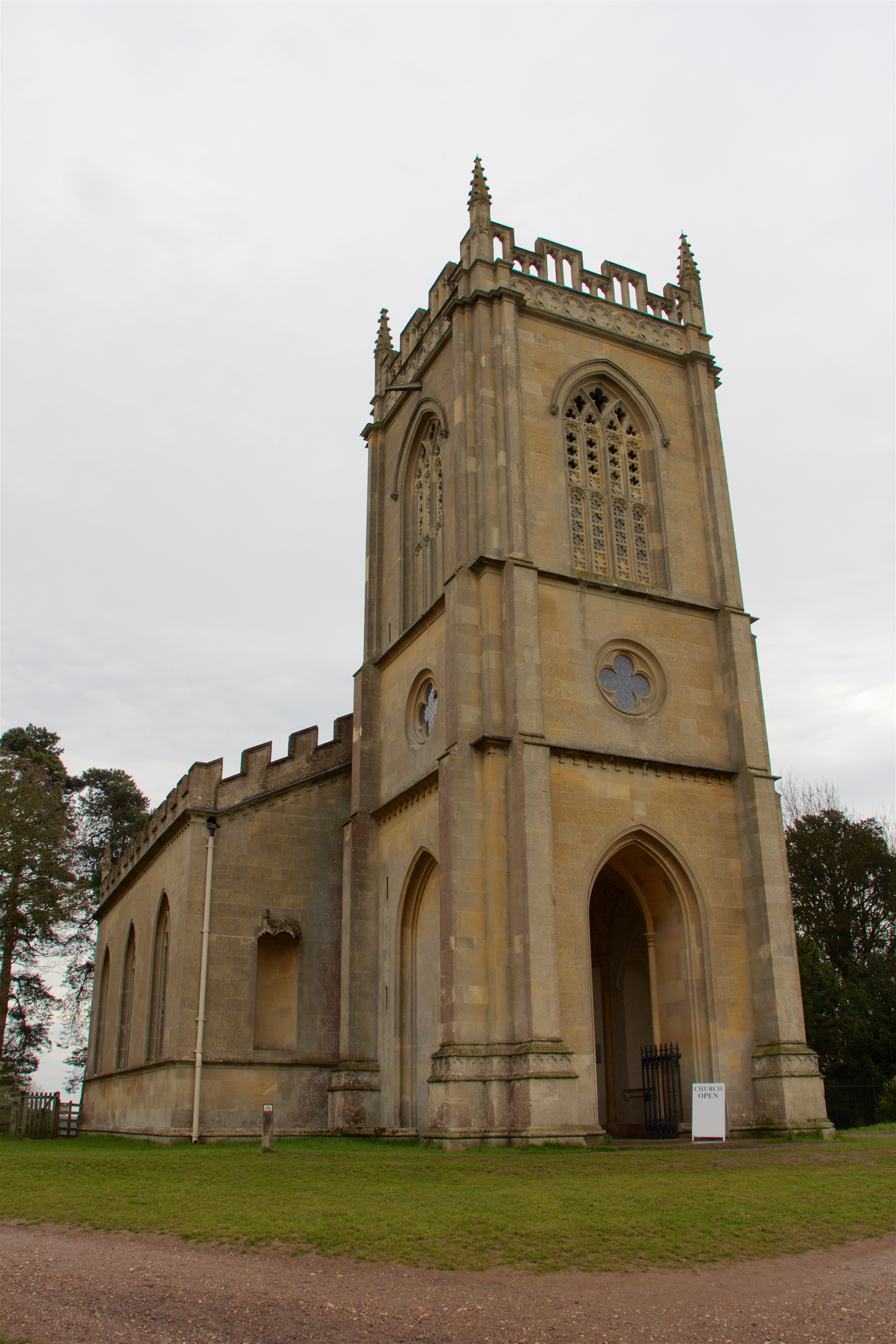
- St Mary Magdalene's from the northwest

- Location in Worcestershire
- OS grid reference: SO 886 450
- Location: Croome D'Abitot, Worcestershire
- Country: England
- Denomination: Anglican
- Website: Churches Conservation Trust

History
- Dedication: Mary Magdalene
- Dedicated: 1763
- Consecrated: 1763

Architecture
- Functional status: Redundant
- Heritage designation: Grade I
- Designated: 25 March 1968
- Architect(s): Lancelot "Capability" Brown, Robert Adam
- Architectural type: Church
- Style: Gothic Revival exterior, Georgian interior
- Completed: 1758
- Closed: 30 October 1973

Specifications
- Materials: Bath Stone

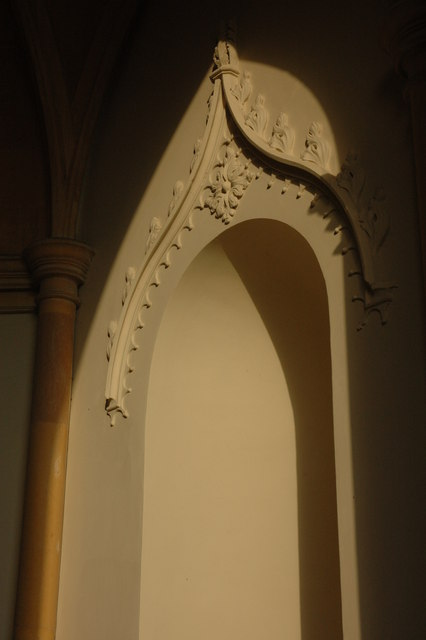
Plasterwork detail in the entrance.

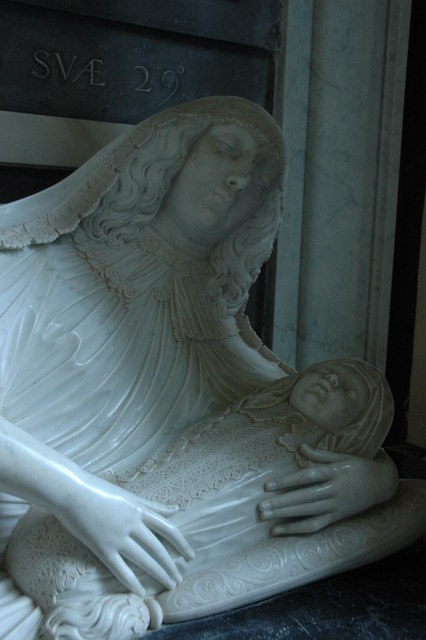
Detail from the Coventry monument: Mary, wife of the 2nd Baron Coventry, who died in child birth in 1634.

St Mary Magdalene's Church is a former Anglican church in the grounds of Croome Court, at Croome D'Abitot, Worcestershire, England. It is recorded in the National Heritage List for England as a designated Grade I listed building, and is under the care of The Churches Conservation Trust. The church, which is dedicated to Jesus' companion Mary Magdalene, stands on a hill in Croome Park. Commenting on the church, the architectural historian Nikolaus Pevsner stated it is "one of the most serious of the Early Gothic Revival outside, one of the most elegant inside".

The 2015 short war drama film Our Father was partially filmed on location at St Mary Magdalene's Church.

== History ==
The first record of a church at Croome D'Abitot is in 1283, when its dedication was to Saint James the Apostle. The precise position of that church is not known, but it is thought it was near the present site of Croome Court. In the 1750s George Coventry, 6th Earl of Coventry decided to demolish the Jacobean house he had inherited and replace it with another church on higher land. He commissioned Lancelot "Capability" Brown to design the new house, together with a church, and to landscape the surrounding garden and grounds. He appointed Robert Adam to design the interior of the house and the church, and also to design some structures in the grounds. The church was consecrated and dedicated to St Mary Magdalene in 1763. Little has changed to the church since then, other than moving the pulpit and pews during the 19th century. The Coventry family cared for the church while they lived in Croome court, but they moved to Earls Croome in 1949. Although the congregation arranged for repairs to be undertaken in the 1960s, it was decreasing in size and was unable to maintain the church. It was declared redundant on 30 October 1973, and was vested in The Churches Conservation Trust in 1975.

== Architecture ==
=== Exterior ===
St Mary's is constructed in Bath Stone. Its exterior is an early example of Gothic Revival architecture, while the interior is in 'pure Georgian Gothic'. The plan consists of a three-bay nave with north and south aisles, a two-bay chancel, and a west tower. The tower is in three stages divided by string courses. The lowest stage consists of a porch which is open on the north, west and south sides. At the entrance to the porch are iron gates, and at the entrance to the church are tall carved doors; these were all designed by Adam. In the middle stage are circular quatrefoil windows, and the top stage has bell openings containing Perpendicular tracery. At the top of the tower is a quatrefoil frieze, and a parapet consisting of a pierced battlement, and crocketed pinnacles. The parapets round the rest of the church are also embattled. The nave has three windows on each side, and at the east and west ends of the aisles are niches. On each side of the chancel are two blank windows and at the east end is a large window.

=== Interior ===
The arcades are carried on quatrefoil piers, and the ceilings are plastered and coved. The roofs of the aisles are flat. The nave ceiling is an elliptical vault, with a moulded plaster centrepiece. The church is floored with limestone slabs, decorated with inserts of black slate. The chancel takes up a greater proportion of the church than would normally be expected. This is because it acts as a mausoleum to the Coventry family, their monuments having been brought from the previous church. To the right side of the altar is a black and white marble memorial to Thomas Coventry, 1st Baron Coventry, who died in 1640 and who had been Lord Keeper of the Great Seal. His effigy is shown reclining between statues personifying Justice, holding the Great Seal, and Virtue. Beside this memorial is one to the 2nd Baron Coventry who died in 1661, depicting his coat of arms. Elsewhere in the church is the memorial of the 4th Baron who died in 1687. It shows him reclining on a sarcophagus reaching towards a figure of Faith. This monument was formerly in the crypt of St Martin-in-the-Fields in London, and was brought here in 1915. Adams designed stained glass windows for the church, but these were never made, and all the windows contain plain glass. The font is no longer in the church. It was designed by Adam and made in elaborately carved mahogany. It consists of a bowl with a cover, standing on a tripod base. The font was stolen from the church, but has been recovered and is now in the Almonry Museum in Evesham.

At the east end of the north aisle is a hatchment for George Coventry, 8th Earl of Coventry, who died in 1843.

=== Bells ===
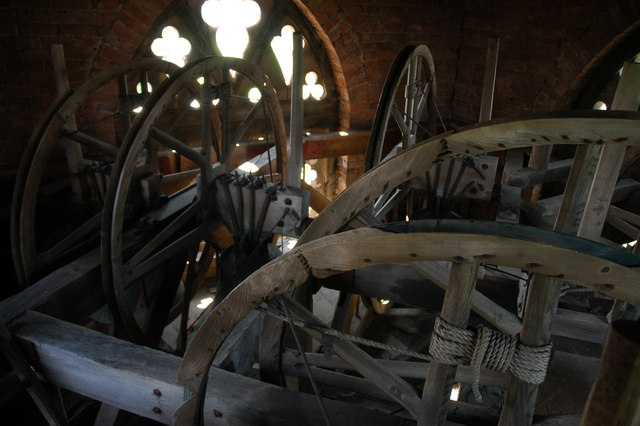
Bell frame, 2008

Bells of St Mary, Croome d'Abitot
No	Mass	Diameter	Note	Founder and date
1	4 cwt 0 qrs 0 lbs	25 3/4	F♯	Thomas Mears I, 1812
2	4 cwt 1 qrs 0 lbs	26 1/2	E	John Martin, 1652
3	5 cwt 0 qrs 0 lbs	28 1/2	D	John Martin, 1652
4	5 cwt 2 qrs 0 lbs	29	C♯	John Martin, 1651
5	7 cwt 0 qrs 0 lbs	32 3/4	B	John Martin, 1651
6	10 cwt 1 qrs 2 lbs	37 1/2	A	Abraham Ruddall I, 1699

== Burials ==
- Thomas Coventry, 1st Baron Coventry
- Thomas Coventry, 2nd Baron Coventry
- George Coventry, 3rd Baron Coventry
- Thomas Coventry, 1st Earl of Coventry
- Thomas Coventry, 2nd Earl of Coventry
- William Coventry, 5th Earl of Coventry
- George Coventry, 6th Earl of Coventry
- George Coventry, 7th Earl of Coventry
- George Coventry, 8th Earl of Coventry
- George Coventry, 9th Earl of Coventry

== External features ==
The churchyard contains the graves of former servants of the family. The house of Croome Court and its surrounding parkland are owned by the National Trust.

== See also ==
- List of churches preserved by the Churches Conservation Trust in the English Midlands
