= Thomas Coventry, 1st Earl of Coventry =

English politician

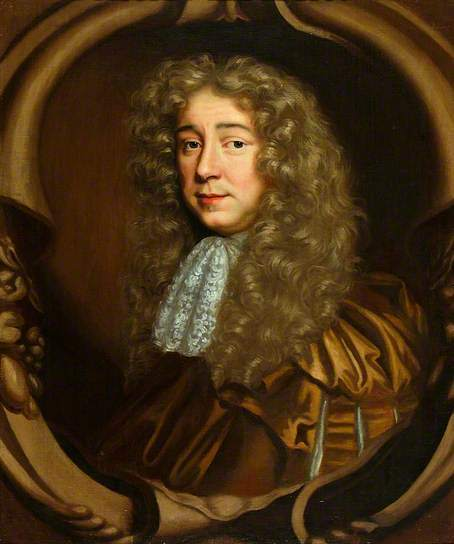
Coventry

Thomas Coventry, 1st Earl of Coventry (ca. 1629 – 15 July 1699), became 5th Baron Coventry on the death of his nephew in 1687. He was created 1st Earl of Coventry in 1697. He was an English politician who sat in the House of Commons at various times between 1660 and 1687 when he succeeded to the peerage.

== Early life ==
Thomas was the younger son of Thomas Coventry, 2nd Baron Coventry, and his wife Mary (née Craven). Thomas Coventry, 1st Baron Coventry, was his grandfather. In April 1660, he was elected Member of Parliament for Droitwich in the Convention Parliament. He was elected MP for Camelford in 1661 for the Cavalier Parliament. In 1681 he was elected MP for Warwick and was re-elected in 1685. He succeeded his nephew as fifth Baron Coventry in 1687 and entered the House of Lords. In 1697 he was made Viscount Deerhurst, of the hundred of Deerhurst in the County of Gloucester, and Earl of Coventry.

== Marriages ==
Lord Coventry married firstly Winifred, daughter of Piers Edgecumbe of Mount Edgecumbe, Devon, circa 1660. She died on 11 June 1694 and was buried at St James's Church, Clerkenwell, London.

He married secondly, on 16 July 1695, Elizabeth (b. July 1669), second daughter of Richard Grimes and his wife, Anne Perry.

He died in July 1699 and was buried at St. Mary Magdalen Church, Croome D'Abitot, Worcestershire. He was succeeded in the earldom by his eldest son from his first marriage, Thomas.

Lady Coventry remarried in May 1700, to Thomas Savage (1673–1742), Lord of Elmley Castle, Worcestershire, by whom she had two daughters, and died on 10 April 1724; buried in St.Mary's, Elmley Castle. The tomb is by William Stanton.

Parliament of England
Preceded by Interregnum	Member of Parliament for Droitwich; 1660–1661; With: Samuel Sandys	Succeeded by Henry Coventry; Samuel Sandys
Preceded by Thomas Vivian; William Cotton	Member of Parliament for Camelford; 1661–1679; With: Charles Roscarrock 1661–65; Sir William Godolphin 1665–79	Succeeded by Sir James Smyth; William Harbord
Preceded by Thomas Lucy; Richard Booth	Member of Parliament for Warwick; 1681–1687; With: Thomas Lucy 1681–85; Simon Digby 1685–1686	Succeeded by William Colemore; William Digby
Honorary titles
Preceded by The Viscount Carrington	Custos Rotulorum of Worcestershire; 1689–1699	Succeeded by The Earl of Coventry
Peerage of England
New creation	Earl of Coventry; 1697–1699	Succeeded by Thomas Coventry
Preceded by John Coventry	Baron Coventry; 1687–1699	Succeeded by Thomas Coventry
