= Thomas Coventry, 2nd Baron Coventry =

English politician

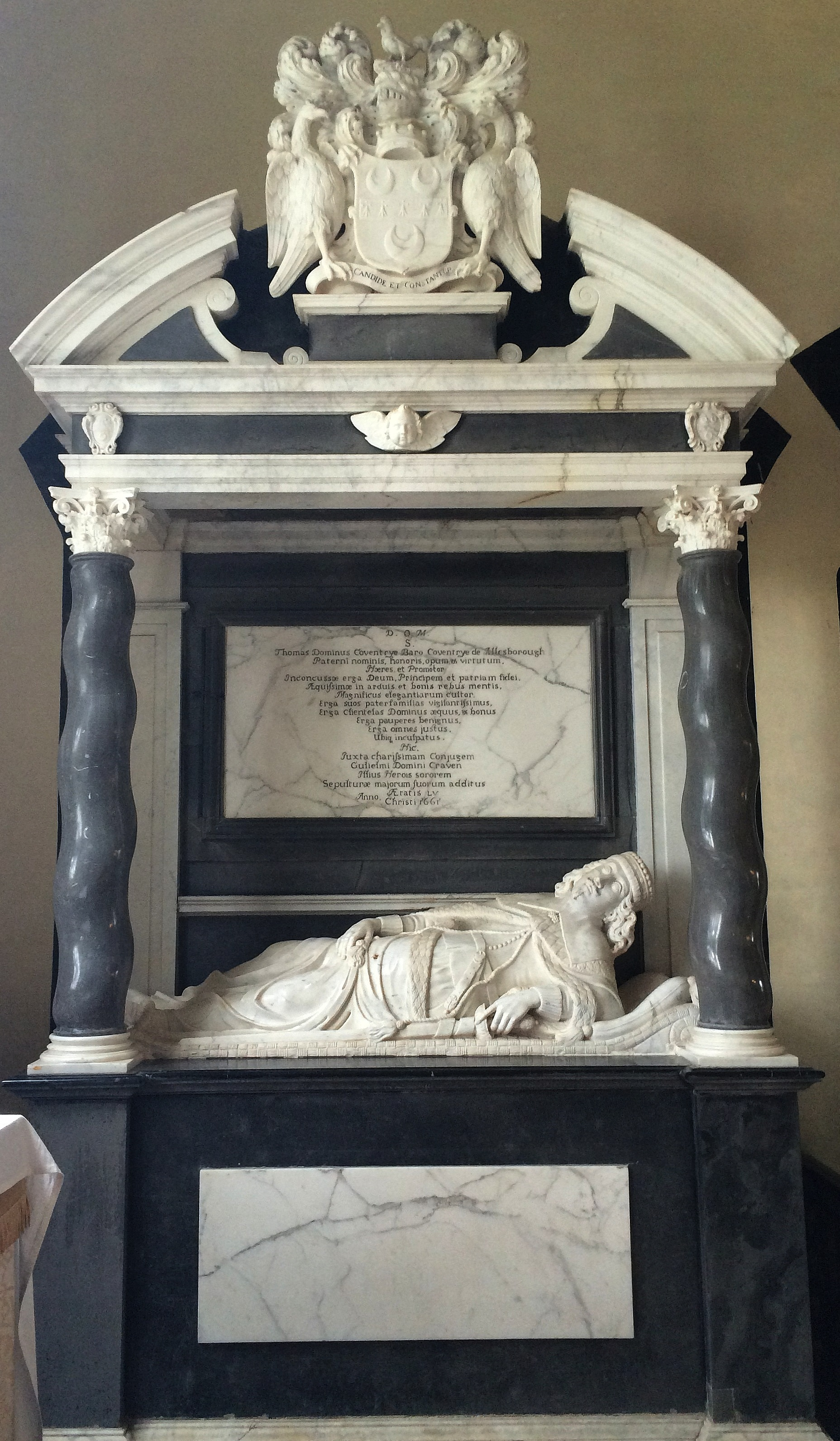
Memorial to the 2nd Baron Coventry in the church at Croome Court

Thomas Coventry, 2nd Baron Coventry (c. 1606 – 27 October 1661) was an English politician who sat in the House of Commons between 1625 and 1629 and was subsequently a member of the House of Lords. He supported the Royalist cause in the English Civil War.

== Family and background ==
Coventry was the son of Thomas Coventry, 1st Baron Coventry and his first wife Sarah Sebright, daughter of John Sebright, and sister of Sir Edward Sebright, a fellow royalist.

Coventry married Mary Craven, daughter of Sir William Craven, former Lord Mayor of London, on 2 April 1627. His younger son Thomas was created Earl of Coventry in 1697.

== Political career ==
In 1625, he was elected Member of Parliament for Droitwich, and was re-elected the following year. In 1628 he was elected MP for Worcestershire and sat until 1629 when King Charles decided to rule without parliament for eleven years.

Coventry was appointed one of the Council of Wales and the Marches on 2 May 1633. He became a Compensation Commissioner for the Avon on 9 March 1637. On 14 January 1640, he succeeded to the title Baron Coventry on the death of his father. He was joint Commissioner of Array in Worcestershire in 1642, and signed the Engagement with the King at York. In 1642 he defended Worcester against the Parliamentary army, but was defeated by Colonel Sandys. He was impeached by the House of Commons, but submitted to Parliament in October 1642, resuming his place in the House of Lords.

In May 1643 he was given permission to go abroad on health grounds. He was back in England the following year. On 15 January 1644, the East India Company were ordered to freeze the money and goods he had in the Company. On 15 April, he was assessed at £3,000 and on 20 September he was assessed at £1,500 by the House of Lords. On 11 April 1645 all his goods and chattels in his house at Westminster were to be seized, inventoried and sold in order to pay off the fine of £1,500.

He was suspected of having Royalist sympathies in 1651, and of supporting Charles II. He was cleared of the charges, but was imprisoned for a time in 1655.

== Death and legacy ==
Coventry died from gangrene in his toes at his house in Lincoln's Inn Fields on 27 October 1661, at the age of about 54. He was buried at Croome d’Abitot church. In his will, dated 31 August 1657, he left £500 in charity to the poor of Evesham.

Parliament of England
Preceded by Walter Blount; John Wilde	Member of Parliament for Droitwich; 1625–1626; With: John Wilde	Succeeded by George Wylde II; John Wilde
Preceded by Sir Thomas Lyttelton; Sir John Rouse	Member of Parliament for Worcestershire; 1628–1629; With: Sir Thomas Bromley	Parliament suspended until 1640
Political offices
Preceded by The Lord Coventry	Custos Rotulorum of Worcestershire; 1628–1646	Vacant Interregnum
Honorary titles
Vacant Interregnum	Custos Rotulorum of Worcestershire; 1660–1661	Succeeded by The Lord Coventry
Peerage of England
Preceded by Thomas Coventry	Baron Coventry; 1640–1661	Succeeded by George Coventry
