= Henry Coventry =

English politician and diplomat

Secretary of State for the Northern Department
- In office 3 July 1672 – 11 September 1674
- Preceded by: Sir John Trevor
- Succeeded by: Sir Joseph Williamson

Secretary of State for the Southern Department
- In office 11 September 1674 – 26 April 1680
- Preceded by: Henry Bennet, Earl of Arlington
- Succeeded by: Robert Spencer, Earl of Sunderland

Personal details
- Born: 1619
- Died: 1676 (aged 56–57)
- Parent(s): Thomas Coventry, Baron Coventry; Elizabeth Aldersley

Henry Coventry (1619–1686), styled "The Honourable" from 1628, was an English politician who was Secretary of State for the Northern Department between 1672 and 1674 and the Southern Department between 1674 and 1680.

== Origins and education ==
Coventry was the third son of Thomas Coventry, 1st Baron Coventry, by the Baron's second marriage to Elizabeth Aldersley. He was the brother of Sir William Coventry, uncle of George Savile, 1st Marquess of Halifax, uncle of Sir John Coventry, and brother-in-law of Anthony Ashley-Cooper, 1st Earl of Shaftesbury. He matriculated from Queen's College, Oxford, in 1632, aged 14, and graduated the following year. Within a year, he was a Fellow of All Souls College, Oxford, and he remained one until 1648. He graduated in both arts and law. He may have become Chancellor of the diocese of Llandaff as early as 1638. In 1640, he obtained leave to travel, and was abroad until just before the Restoration. He was thus absent from England during the English Civil Wars.

== Career ==
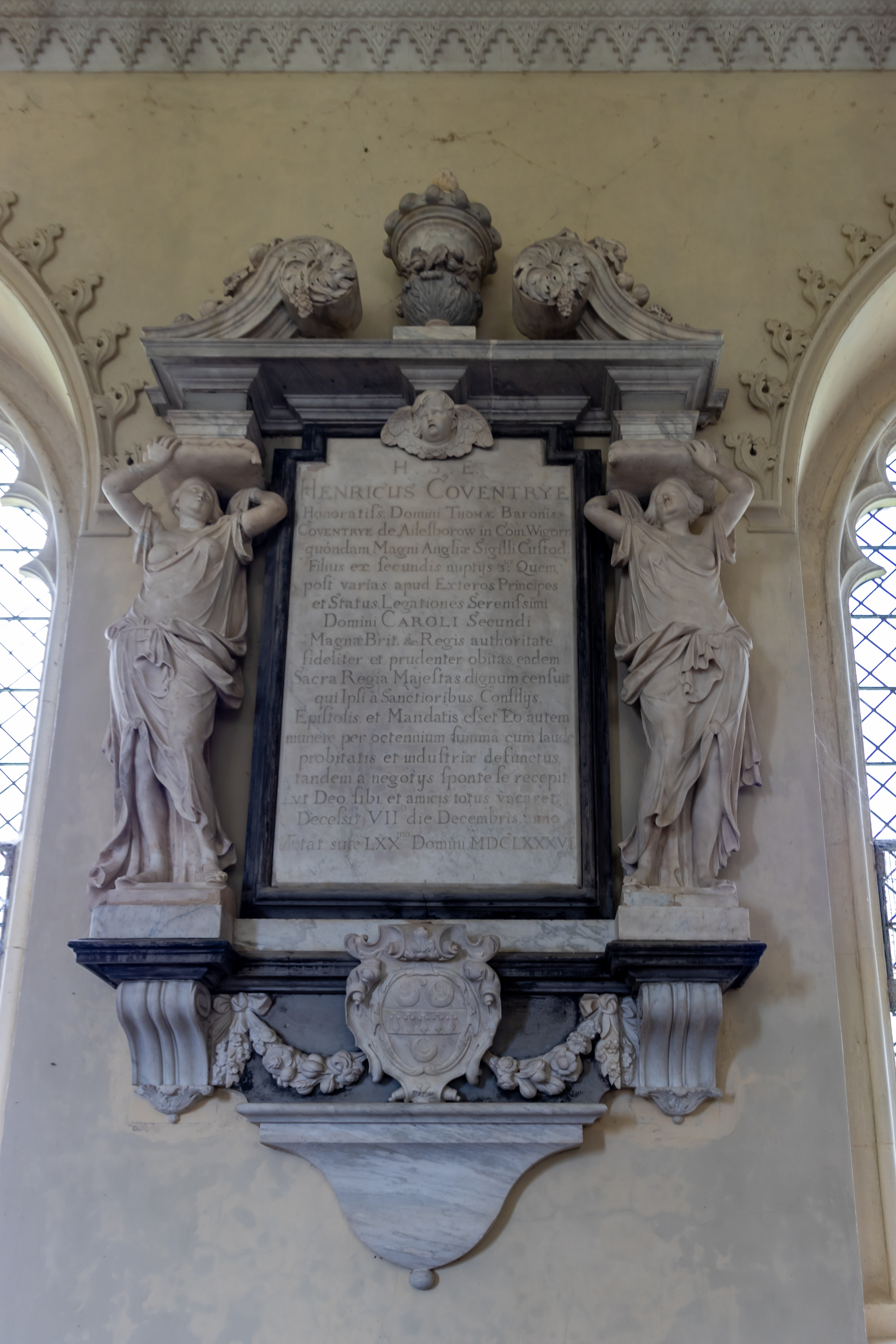
Memorial to Henry Coventry in the church at Croome Court

By 1654, he was a captain in the Dutch army, but in contact with Charles II in his exile. During part of his time abroad, he was employed as a royalist agent in Germany and Denmark, in company with Lord Wentworth, until the partnership was dissolved by a violent quarrel, leading apparently to a duel. The reports of his whereabouts at this date are very confused: Henry, his elder brother Francis and his younger brother William were all attached to the exiled court, and were all commonly spoken of as "Coventry". Before the Restoration Francis had ceased to take any active part in public affairs, and William had devoted himself more especially to the service of the Duke of York, whose secretary he continued to be while the duke held the office of Lord High Admiral.

In 1660, Coventry returned to England with letters for Presbyterian leaders including Sir Anthony Ashley-Cooper, who had been married to Henry's sister Margaret. At the same time, he enjoyed the patronage of Edward Hyde, 1st Earl of Clarendon, and remained a faithful friend of Clarendon to the end. In 1661, Henry became Member of Parliament (MP) for Droitwich. He remained in the service of the crown, holding the position of Groom of the Bedchamber from 1662 to 1672, and in September 1664, he was sent as ambassador to Sweden, where he remained for the next two years, "accustoming himself to the northern ways of entertainment, and this grew upon him with age". In 1667, he was sent, jointly with Lord Holles, as plenipotentiary to negotiate the Treaty of Breda, which, after the disgraceful summer, was finally concluded at Breda.

=== Fall of Clarendon ===
During the negotiations at Breda, he found time to write a heartfelt letter of condolence to his old friend Lord Clarendon on the death of his wife Frances Hyde. Unlike his brother William, Henry opposed Clarendon's impeachment and banishment, and his eloquent speeches in the House of Commons in Clarendon's defence enhanced his reputation. When the King, who was determined that Clarendon must fall, expressed his displeasure at his known wishes in the matter being defied, Henry with his usual frankness replied that if he could not speak his mind in Parliament, he had best not go there at all. To the King's credit, despite their disagreements, he was later willing to raise Henry to high office.

Coventry's loyalty as a friend would be further demonstrated by his attitude to Clarendon in exile: he cancelled the prohibition on visits by his children to Clarendon in his French exile and may have been working towards Clarendon's eventual return from exile when Clarendon died in 1674. He then organised Clarendon's private funeral in Westminster Abbey.

=== Secretary of State ===
In 1671 Coventry was again sent on an embassy to Sweden, and in 1672 was appointed Secretary of State for the Northern Department, transferring to the Southern Department in 1674. He continued in this office until 1680, when his poor health, shattered by frequent attacks of gout, compelled him to retire from public life. He was a capable administrator, who built up an efficient intelligence service: even the most minor complaints against the Crown, such as the "curse on the King for his bad example to other husbands", uttered by the wife of the town gaoler in Newcastle upon Tyne, came to his attention.

=== Popish Plot ===
During the Popish Plot, while the nerve of his colleague, Joseph Williamson, cracked under the strain, Coventry generally maintained his composure, but he was concerned at the public hysteria: "the nation and the city are in as great a consternation as can be imagined". His cynical, sceptical nature, like Charles II's, disinclined him, at least in the early stages, to believe in the Plot, and he was particularly wary of the notorious informer William Bedloe. Like most rational people at the time, he came to believe that there had been a plot of some sort, although he regarded much of the evidence as suspect. During the Exclusion Crisis, he was one of the first to warn that any attempt to bar the Duke of York from the succession might lead to civil war: "if that Prince go into another place, it must cost you a standing army to bring him back".

== Reputation ==
According to Gilbert Burnet, "he was a man of wit and heat, of spirit and candour. He never gave bad advices; but when the king followed the ill advices which others gave, he thought himself bound to excuse if not to justify them. For this the Duke of York commended him much. He said in that he was a pattern to all good subjects, since he defended all the king's counsels in public, even when he had blamed them most in private with the king himself".

He had "an unclouded reputation" for honesty: it is to his credit that after holding public office for nearly 20 years he had not accumulated any large fortune; though no doubt in easy circumstances, he wrote of himself as feeling straitened by the loss of his official salary on 31 December 1680.

Writing to Sir Robert Carr on 12 September 1676 and regretting his inability to fulfil some promise relative to a vacant post, he said: "Promises are like marriages; what we tie with our tongues we cannot untie with our teeth. I have been discreet enough as to the last, but frequently a fool as to the first." Clarendon, grateful for Henry's loyalty to him at the lowest point of his career, called him "a much wiser man" than his brother William, whom Clarendon never forgave for what he saw as William's betrayal of him in 1667.

== Legacy ==
Coventry Street in London is named after him.

== Sources ==
- Handley, Stuart. "Coventry, Henry (1617/18–1686)". Oxford Dictionary of National Biography (online ed.). Oxford University Press. doi:10.1093/ref:odnb/6477. (Subscription, Wikipedia Library access or UK public library membership required.)

Attribution

- This article incorporates text from a publication now in the public domain: Stephen, Leslie, ed. (1887). "Coventry, Henry (1619-1686)". Dictionary of National Biography. Vol. 12. London: Smith, Elder & Co.

Parliament of England
Preceded by Thomas Coventry; Samuel Sandys I	Member of Parliament for Droitwich; 1661–1685; With: Samuel Sandys II 1661–1681; Samuel Sandys I 1681–1685	Succeeded by Thomas Windsor; Samuel Sandys II
Diplomatic posts
Preceded by ?	British ambassador to Sweden; 1664–1666	Succeeded by ?
Preceded by ?	British ambassador to Sweden; 1671	Succeeded by ?
Preceded by Sir John Trevor	Secretary of State for the Northern Department; 1672–1674	Succeeded by Sir Joseph Williamson
Preceded by Henry Bennet, 1st Earl of Arlington	Secretary of State for the Southern Department; 1674–1680	Succeeded by Robert Spencer, 2nd Earl of Sunderland
