= Custos Rotulorum of Worcestershire =

This is a list of people who have served as Custos Rotulorum of Worcestershire.

- Sir John Pakington 1544–1551
- William Sheldon bef. 1558–1570
- Sir Thomas Russell bef. 1573–1574
- Sir John Lyttelton bef. 1577–1590
- Sir John Pakington bef. 1594–1623
- Sir John Pakington, 1st Baronet 1623–1624
- Thomas Coventry, 1st Baron Coventry 1624–1628
- Thomas Coventry, 2nd Baron Coventry 1628–1646
- Interregnum
- Thomas Coventry, 2nd Baron Coventry 1660–1661
- George Coventry, 3rd Baron Coventry 1661–1680
- John Coventry, 4th Baron Coventry 1681–1687
- Francis Smith, 2nd Viscount Carrington 1688–1689
- Thomas Coventry, 1st Earl of Coventry 1689–1699
- Thomas Coventry, 2nd Earl of Coventry 1699–1710
- Other Windsor, 2nd Earl of Plymouth 1710–1715
- John Somers, 1st Baron Somers 1715–1716
- vacant
- Thomas Parker, 1st Baron Parker 1719
- William Coventry, 5th Earl of Coventry 1719–1751

For later custodes rotulorum, see Lord Lieutenant of Worcestershire.
