= George Coventry, 3rd Baron Coventry =

English nobleman (1628 – 1680)

George Coventry, 3rd Baron Coventry (1628 – 15 December 1680) was an English nobleman, the eldest son of Thomas Coventry, 2nd Baron Coventry and Mary Craven.

On 18 July 1653, he married Lady Margaret Tufton, daughter of John Tufton, 2nd Earl of Thanet, by whom he had two children:

- John Coventry, 4th Baron Coventry (1654–1687)
- Margaret Coventry (14 June 1657 – 7 February 1682), married Charles Paulet, 2nd Duke of Bolton

Honorary titles
Preceded by The Lord Coventry	Custos Rotulorum of Worcestershire; 1661–1680	Succeeded by The Lord Coventry
Peerage of England
Preceded by Thomas Coventry	Baron Coventry; 1661–1680	Succeeded by John Coventry
