= George Coventry, 13th Earl of Coventry =

George William Coventry, 13th Earl of Coventry (born 5 October 1939) is an English peer.

Coventry is the son of Commander Cecil Dick Bluett Coventry, and was educated at Prince of Wales School, Nairobi. In 1965, he married Gillian Frances Randall, by whom he has one daughter:

- Lady Diana Elizabeth Sherwood Coventry (b. 1980)

In 2004, he succeeded his fourth cousin in the earldom. He lives in Hampton, London.

Peerage of England
Preceded by Francis Coventry	Earl of Coventry; 2004–present	Incumbent heir presumptive: Duncan Coventry
