= Croome Court =

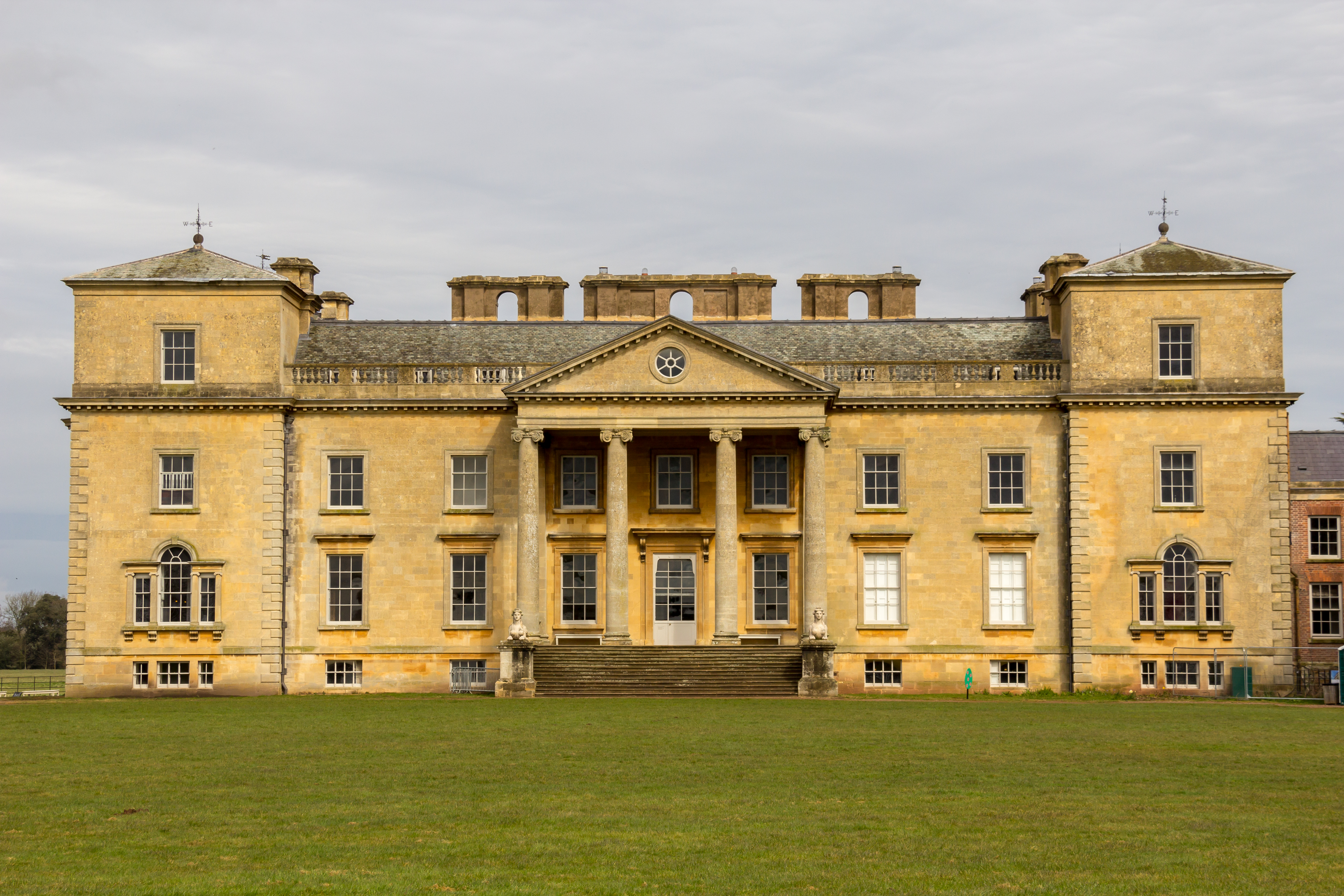
- The southern façade of Croome Court

General information
- Type: Country house
- Architectural style: Neo-Palladian
- Location: Croome D'Abitot, Worcestershire, England
- Coordinates: 52.0996°N 2.1694°W
- Construction started: 1754
- Completed: 1760
- Client: George Coventry, 6th Earl of Coventry
- Owner: Croome Heritage Trust
- Operator: National Trust

Design and construction
- Architect: Lancelot "Capability" Brown

Website
- www.nationaltrust.org.uk/croome

Croome Court is a mid-18th-century Neo-Palladian mansion surrounded by extensive landscaped parkland at Croome D'Abitot, near Upton-upon-Severn in south Worcestershire, England. The mansion and park were designed by Lancelot "Capability" Brown for George Coventry, 6th Earl of Coventry, and they were Brown's first landscape design and first major architectural project. Some of the mansion's rooms were designed by Robert Adam. St Mary Magdalene's Church, Croome D'Abitot that sits within the grounds of the park is now owned and cared for by the Churches Conservation Trust.

The mansion house is owned by Croome Heritage Trust and leased to the National Trust, which operates it as a tourist attraction. The National Trust owns the surrounding parkland, which is also open to the public.

== Location ==
Croome Court is located near to Croome D'Abitot, in Worcestershire, near Pirton, Worcestershire. The wider estate was established on lands that were once part of the royal forest of Horewell. Traces of these older landscapes, such as unimproved commons and ancient woodlands, can be found across the former Croome Estate.

== House ==
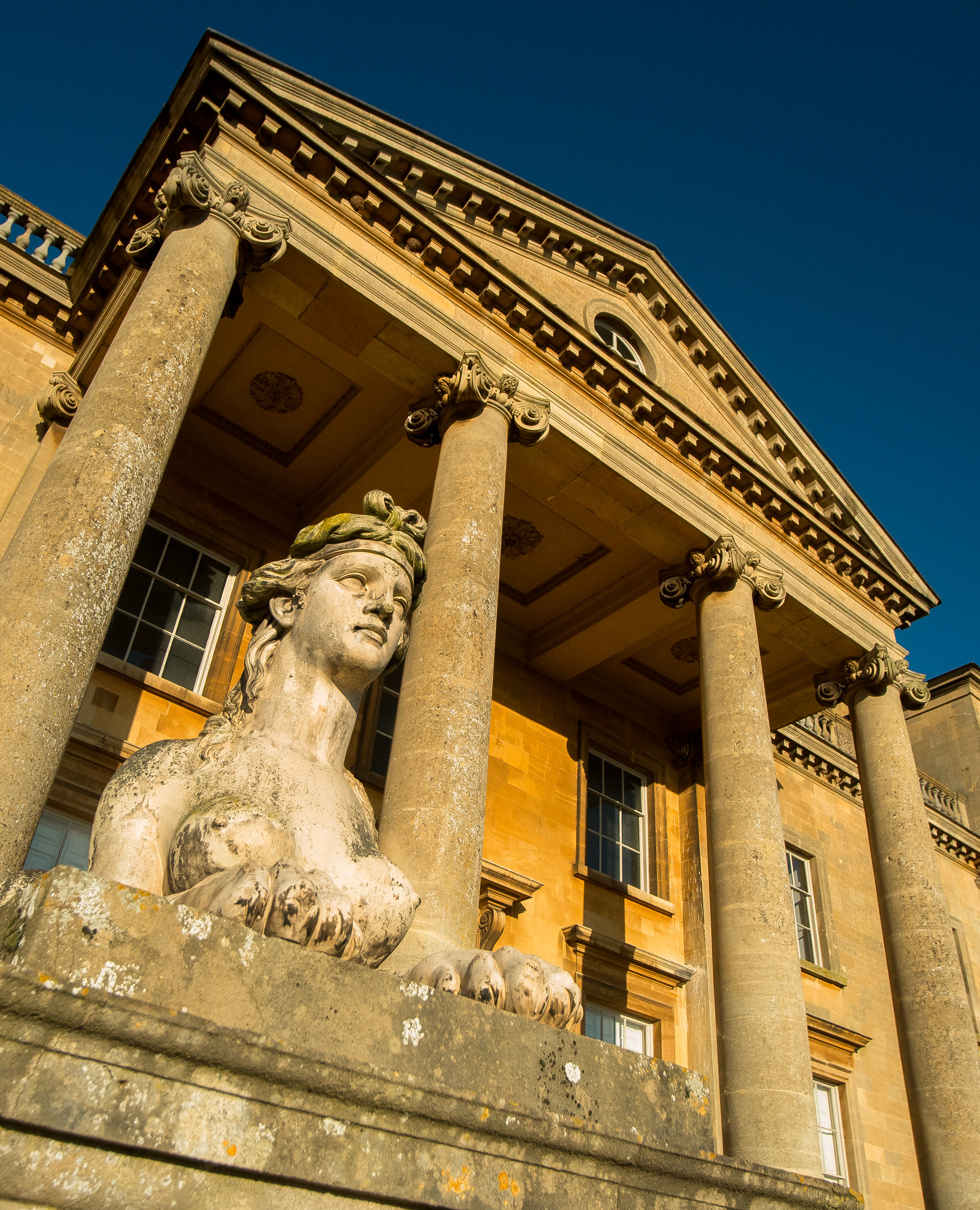
Croome Court South Portico

=== History ===
The foundations and core of Croome Court, including the central chimney stack structure, date back to the early 1640s. Substantial changes to this early house were made by Gilbert Coventry, 4th Earl of Coventry.

George Coventry, the 6th Earl, inherited the estate in 1751, along with the existing Jacobean house. He commissioned Lancelot "Capability" Brown, with the assistance of Sanderson Miller, to redesign the house and estate. It was Brown's "first flight into the realms of architecture" and a "rare example of his architectural work", and it is an important and seminal work. It was built between 1751 and 1752, and it and Hagley Hall are considered to be the finest examples of Neo-Palladian architecture in Worcestershire. Notable Neo-Palladian features incorporated into Croome Court include the plain exterior and the corner towers with pyramidal roofs (a feature first used by Inigo Jones in the design of Wilton House in Wiltshire). Robert Adam worked on the interior of the building from 1760 onwards. The house was visited by George III, as well as by Queen Victoria during summers when she was a child, and George V (when Duke of York).

A jam factory was built near Pershore railway station by George Coventry, 9th Earl of Coventry in about 1880, to provide a market for Vale of Evesham fruit growers in times of surplus. Although the Croome connection with jam-making had ceased, the building was leased by the Croome Estate Trust during the First World War to the Huddersfield Fruit Preserving Company as a pulping station. The First World War deeply affected Croome; there were many local casualties, although the house was not requisitioned for the war effort. This is possibly because it was the home of the Lord-lieutenant of the county, who needed a residence for his many official engagements. Croome Court was requisitioned during the Second World War by the Ministry of Works, and leased for a year to the Dutch Government as a possible refuge for Queen Wilhelmina of the Netherlands to escape the Nazi occupation of the Netherlands. However, evidence shows that Queen Wilhelmina stayed for two weeks at the most, perhaps because of the noise and the fear created by the proximity of RAF Defford. The Dutch Royal family later emigrated to Canada for the duration of the war.

The Croome Estate Trust sold the Court in 1948, along with 38 acres (15 ha) of land, to the Roman Catholic Archdiocese of Birmingham, and the mansion became St Joseph's Special School, which was run by nuns from 1950 until 1979. In 1979, the hall was taken over by the International Society for Krishna Consciousness (ISKCON, the Hare Krishna movement) which used it as its UK headquarters and a training college, called Chaitanya College. During their tenure they repainted the Dining Room. ISKCON left the estate in 1984 for financial reasons. It held a festival at the hall in 2011. From 1984 onwards, various owners tried to use the property as a training centre; apartments; a restaurant and conference centre; and a hotel and golf course, before once more becoming a private family home, with outbuildings converted to private houses.

The house was purchased by the Croome Heritage Trust, a registered charity, in October 2007, and it is now managed by the National Trust as a tourist attraction. It opened to the public in September 2009, at which point six of the rooms had been restored, costing £400,000, including the Saloon. It was estimated that another £4 million to £4.8 million would be needed to restore the entire building. Fundraising activities for the restoration included a 2011 raffle for a Morgan sports car organised by Lord and Lady Flight. After the restoration is complete, a 999-year lease on the building will be granted to the National Trust. An oral history project to record recollections about Croome was funded by the Heritage Lottery Fund. As of 2009, the service wing was empty and in need of substantial repair. The house was listed on 11 August 1952; it is currently Grade I listed.

=== Exterior ===
The mansion is faced with Bath stone, limestone ashlar, and has both north and south facing fronts. It has a basement and two stories, with three stories in the end pavilions. A slate roof, with pyramid roofs over the corner towers, tops the building, along with three pair-linked chimneys along the axis of the house.

Both fronts have 11 bays, split into three central sets of three each, and one additional bay each side. The north face has a pedimented centre, with two balustraded staircases leading to a Roman Doric doorcase. The south face has a projecting Ionic tetrastyle portico and Venetian windows. It has a broad staircase, with Coade stone sphinxes on each side, leading to a south door topped with a cornice on consoles. The wings have modillion cornice and balustrade.

A two-story L-shaped service wing is attached to the east side of the mansion. It is made of red brick and stone, with slate roofs. It was designed by Capability Brown in 1751–1752. On the far side of the service wing, a wall connects it to a stable court.

=== Interior ===
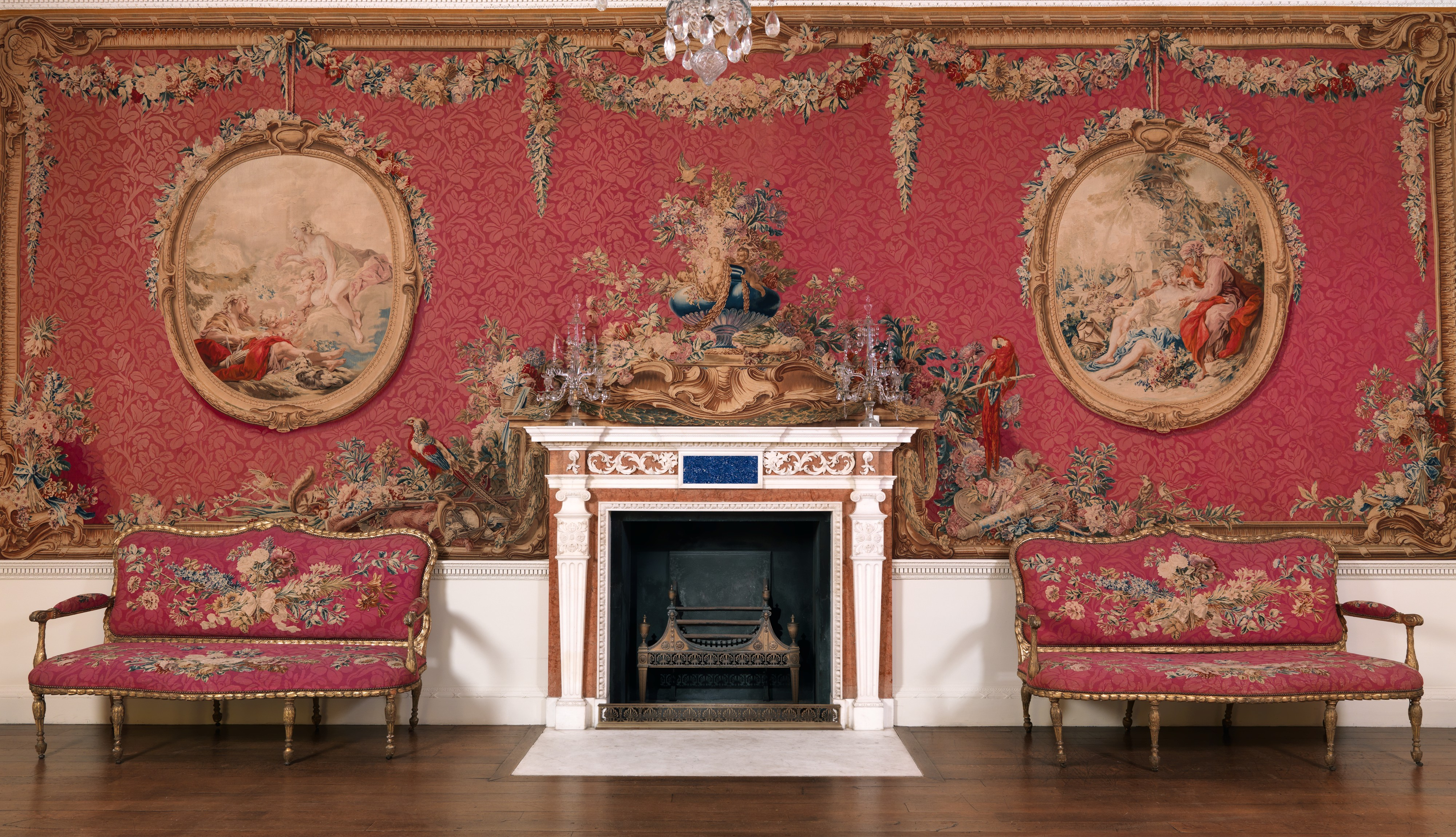
The Tapestry Room, now at the Metropolitan Museum of Art

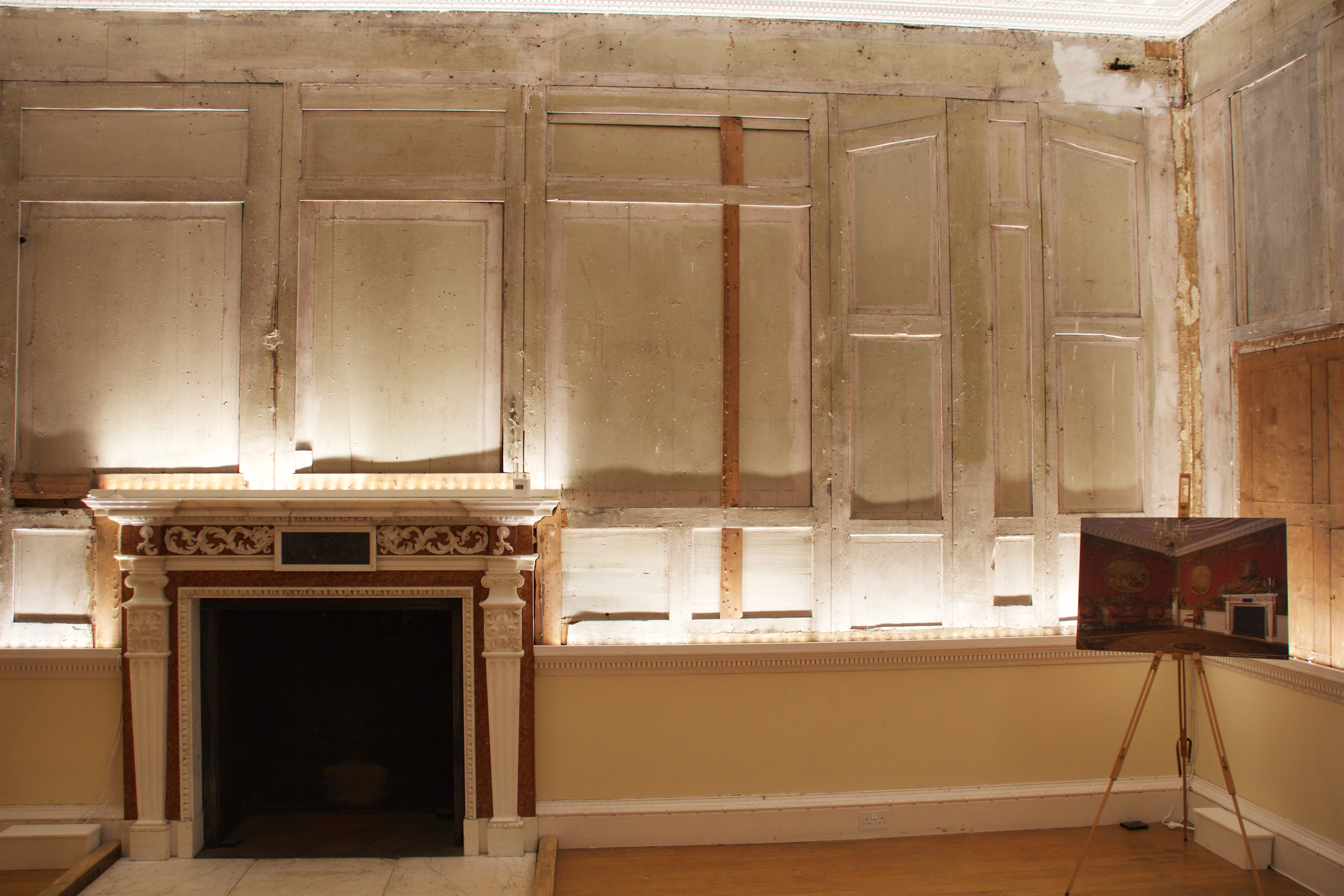
... and the Tapestry Room at Croome Court today

The interior of the house was designed partially by Capability Brown, with plasterwork by G. Vassalli, and partially by Robert Adam, with plasterwork by Joseph Rose, Jr. It has a central spine corridor. A stone staircase, with iron balusters, is at the east end.

The entrance hall is on the north side of the building, and has four fluted Doric columns, along with moulded doorcases. To the east of the entrance hall is the dining room, which has a plaster ceiling and cornice, while to the west is a billiard room, featuring fielded panelling, a plaster cornice, and a rococo chimneypiece. The three rooms were probably decorated around 1758–1759 by Capability Brown. The dining room was vibrantly repainted by the Hare Krishnas in the 1970s-80s.

The central room on the south side is a saloon, probably by Brown and Vassalli. It has an elaborate ceiling, with three panels, deep coving, and a cornice, along with two Ionic chimneypieces, and Palladian doorcases. King George III was entertained by George Coventry, the 6th Earl, in the house's Saloon. A drawing room is to the west of the saloon, and features rococo plasterwork and a marble chimneypiece.

To the east of the saloon is the Tapestry Room. This was designed in 1763–1771, based on a design by Robert Adam, and contained tapestries and furniture covers possibly designed by François Boucher and Maurice Jacques, and made by Manufacture Nationale des Gobelins. Around 1902 the 9th Earl sold the tapestries and seating to a Parisian dealer. The Samuel H. Kress Foundation purchased the ceiling, floor, chimneypiece, chair rails, doors and door surrounds in 1949; they were donated to the Metropolitan Museum of Art, New York, in 1958. In 1959, the Kress Foundation also helped the Metropolitan Museum acquire the chair and sofa frames, which they recovered using the original tapestry seats. A copy of the ceiling was installed in place of the original. As of 2016, the room is displayed as it would have looked after the tapestries had been sold, with a jug and ewer on display as the only original decoration of the room that remains in it. The adjacent library is used to explain what happened to the tapestry room; the former library was designed by Adam, and was dismantled except for the marble chimneypiece.

At the west side of the building is a Long Gallery which was designed by Robert Adam and installed between 1761 and 1766. It is the best preserved element of the original interior (little of the rest has survived in situ). It has an octagonal panelled ceiling, and plaster reliefs of griffins. A half-hexagonal bay faces the garden. The room also contains a marble caryatid chimneypiece designed by J Wilton. As of 2016, modern sculptures are displayed in empty niches along the Long Gallery.

== Walled gardens ==
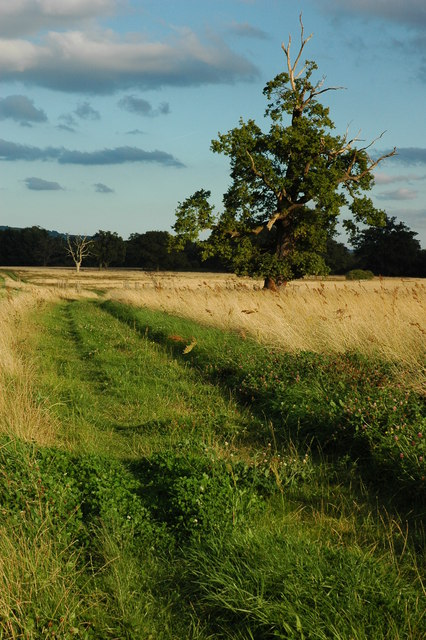
A pasture in Croome Park.

The first garden at Croome was developed in the late 17th century by Ann Somerset, the wife of Thomas Coventry, 2nd Earl of Coventry, along with William Shenstone. A kitchen garden was laid out in the early 18th century, at a time when Gilbert Coventry, 4th Earl of Coventry was making large changes to the house and garden, which subsequently became the walled garden.

The earliest plan for a walled garden dates from about 1750, when George William Coventry, the heir of the 5th Earl at the time, changed the shape of the walls from square to the rhomboid shape that exists today, mentored by Sanderson Miller. This created a garden of over 7 acres (2.8 ha), which may have made it the largest 18th-century walled garden in Europe. The increase in size allowed the garden to encompass a classical greenhouse on the eastern side of the garden. The walls of the garden were under construction at the time, probably replacing hedges. The date that the walls were finished is uncertain, but there is evidence that they must have been completed by 1752.

Unlike the mansion and the park, the walled garden was largely unchanged by Capability Brown, but it did receive new hot houses to house melons, pineapples, peaches, and vines, and in 1766 a stone-curbed circular pool was created, with a sundial designed by Adam.

In about 1806 a 13 feet (4.0 m)-high free-standing east–west heated wall was built, slightly off-centre, serviced by five furnaces. It is historically significant as it is one of the first such structures ever built.

Almost the entire 18th-century records of the garden survive; together with the garden they are a nationally important part of garden history, and the history of Worcestershire. The garden and its glass houses were mentioned in Gardening World in 1887.

During the 20th century the walled gardens were abandoned and fell into disrepair. They were purchased by Chris and Karen Cronin, who started restoring them in Summer 2000, including restoring many buildings and the greenhouses. The gardens opened to the public for the first time in August 2014. They are privately operated, not being part of the National Trust.

== Park ==
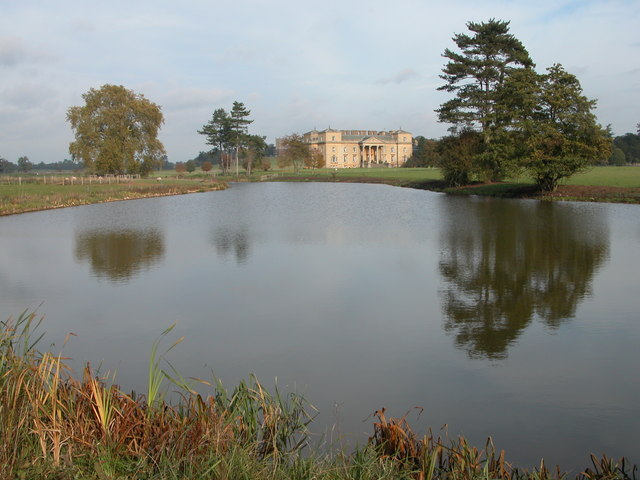
Croome Court in 2006. Viewed from the far side of the ornamental lake.

Croome Park has a man-made lake and river, statues, temples and other buildings with the Court as the central focus. The other buildings around the park include Gatehouses, a Grotto, a Church and buildings termed "eye-catchers". These are Pirton Castle, Panorama Tower, Dunstall Castle and Park Seat. They are set away from the core of the Park and are intended to draw the eye into the wider landscape.

The park was Capability Brown's first complete landscape, and was set out from 1751 onwards. Croome and Hagley Hall have more follies and other similar features than any estate in Worcestershire. A lot of the park was designed to be viewed from the Croome Court house. Robert Adam, along with James Wyatt, designed temples and follies for the park.

A family trust, Croome Estate Trustees, was set up by the George Coventry, 9th Earl of Coventry, to manage the house and estate. In the mid-1970s the trust transferred ownership of the central core of the park to George William Coventry, 11th Earl of Coventry; in 1981 he sold it to Sun Alliance. The National Trust bought 670 acres (270 ha) of parkland in 1996, using heritage lottery funding along with a donation from Sun Alliance; the rest of Sun Alliance's property at the estate was sold to the Society of Merchant Venturers.

The National Trust owns and has restored the core of the original 18th-century parkland, and it is open to visitors throughout the year. To visit many of the features below, you have to enter the pay-for-entry National Trust parkland. Some areas, however, are accessible via public footpaths which can be tracked on OS map 150.

=== St Mary Magdalene Church ===
This Grade I listed building was built in 1763 by Capability Brown for the Earl of Coventry. A medieval church nearer the Court was demolished to make way for this church, the interior of which was designed by Robert Adam. The church is owned and cared for by the Churches Conservation Trust.

=== Rotunda ===
Described as a "garden room", the Rotunda was designed by Brown and built between 1754 and 1757. The door and windows are pedimented and inside is a coffered ceiling and stuccowork by Francesco Vassalli in 1761. The joinery was by John Hobcroft. The Portland-stone panels above the windows and door are Robert Adam's design and were carved by Sefferin Alker and added in 1763. The Rotunda is located in the shrubbery, 350 metres (1,150 ft) east of the mansion, and overlooks the parkland, with views to the Park Seat to the south. It is Grade I listed. It was purchased by the Croome Heritage Trust in 2007, at the same time as the main house, and restoration was under way in 2009, funded by a Natural England grant. Some of the cedar trees that shelter it were planted at the same time it was built. The exterior has been restored in 2010 by the National Trust.

=== Park Seat ===
The Park Seat, also known as The Owl's Nest, was designed by Robert Adam in 1770 as a viewing station for the park. It was restored by the National Trust using a Natural England grant. It is a Grade II* listed building.

=== London Arch and lodge ===
The London (or Pershore) Arch is the main entrance to the park. It was designed by Robert Adam in the 1770s. It gained its name from the carriages of guests travelling from London, passing under it. It once had railings on either side, which are thought to have been removed during the Second World War. Its restoration started in 2013, including the repair of water damage to the central masonry; the restoration was due to last five years. The arch and the adjacent lodge has a Grade I listing.

=== Ha-Ha ===
The ha-ha was restored by the National Trust using a Natural England grant.

=== Ice House ===
The Ice House was restored by the National Trust using a Natural England grant.

=== Temple Greenhouse ===
Temple Greenhouse was designed by Robert Adam. As of 2016 it is used as a tea room.

This Grade I listed building was completed in 1763. It used to have large sash windows in the front of it, but now only the grooves where they used to slide can be seen. It housed the Earl's collection of exotic plants and was heated in the winter by a fire lit in a brick bothy at the back, then the heat was channelled underneath through gaps in the floor. It is a Grade I listed building.

=== Around the Lake ===
The grotto and various features were designed by Capability Brown. 50,000 cubic metres of silt and vegetation were removed when restoring the lake. Nearby are the Punch Bowl gates designed by Wyatt in 1793 to 1794. On one of the islands in the lake is the temple pavilion (1776–1777).

=== Island Pavilion ===
Of c.1800 and likely by Wyatt, the Island Temple or pavilion is a Grade I listed building.

=== Worcester Lodge ===
Worcester Lodge was designed around 1800, probably by James Wyatt. It has been a Grade II listed building since 11 August 1952.

It was built in 1801 and subsequently rebuilt in 1879. This sat on the main road to Croome from Worcester. A carriage drive used to run from the lodge directly to the Punch Bowl Gates in the Park itself and onto the Court beyond. The driveway no longer exists and the lodge is now cut off from the rest of the Park by the construction of the M5 motorway. Today, the lodge is a private residence and not part of the National Trust owned Park. Further down the road on the same side of the M5 is the Keeper's House (or Huntsman's House).

=== Panorama Tower ===
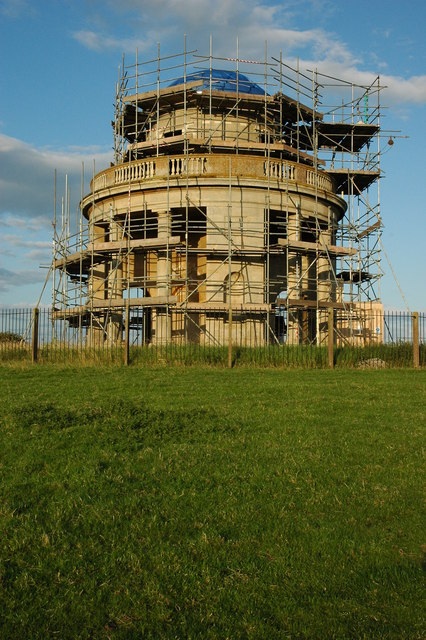
Panorama Tower being restored in 2009

A circular eyecatcher temple, the Panorama Tower was designed by James Wyatt in 1801 using design ideas by Robert Adam. The building was not completed until after the 6th Earl of Coventry's death, probably in 1812. It is located on Cubsmoor, 2 kilometres (1.2 miles) from the mansion. It has views over the park and surrounding landscape, and it was used in hunting as a viewing platform. Grade I listed, it was in poor condition in 2009, and was undergoing essential repairs. It was purchased by the National Trust in 2009, and restoration of it was funded by a grant from Natural England. It is a prominent landmark that can be seen from the M5 motorway. The watercolour design, signed by James Wyatt, survives.

It is situated on Knight's Hill at the very edge of the park. The building had been in deterioration for decades. It is a circular two-storey building with a central interior staircase leading up to a viewing platform under a domed roof where there are views across Worcestershire to the Malvern Hills.

=== Pirton Castle ===
Pirton Castle is an eyecatcher and belvedere designed by James Wyatt and built by William Stephens in 1797 as an ivy-clad Gothic ruin. The watercolour design, signed by James Wyatt in 1801, survives.

It is a Grade II listed building since 14 June 1985. It was purchased by the National Trust in 2009, and restoration of it was funded by a grant from Natural England. It was restored by Midland Conservation, who stabilised the structure, removed destructive vegetation from it, and repaired the masonry – including repointing it, and rebuilding the upper levels. Restoration was completed in August 2009.

It is located on Rabbit Bank, a prominent ridge in the landscape at Pirton to the north of the park and Court. The building was constructed among a row of Cedar of Lebanon trees, many of which still stand today along the ridge. Pirton Castle is a feature from the M5 motorway northbound, which cuts through the park.

=== Dunstall Castle ===
Dunstall Castle was constructed in 1766–1767, and resembles a ruined castle. It was designed by either Sanderson Miller, or Robert Adam as an eyecatcher, and it is located on Dunstall Common, Earls Croome. In 2009 the stonework was in bad condition, and essential repairs were under way. It is Grade II* listed. It was purchased by the National Trust in 2009, and restoration of it was funded by a grant from Natural England.

== RAF Defford ==
During the Second World War, the Ministry of Works requisitioned Croome Court and the surrounding parks for use as the top secret base of RAF Defford, which occupied part of the Croome Court estate.

== Croome collection ==
The Croome collection is an archive that comprises records of the plans, deeds, correspondence and rentals relating to the Coventry family. It includes records of the Croome Court building, including its decoration and furnishing, and the creation and development of the surrounding parkland. In 2005 the collection was accepted in lieu of inheritance tax, and in 2006 the estate archives up until 1921 were rehomed at the Worcestershire Record Office, with later records remaining at the Croome Estate office.

== Gallery ==
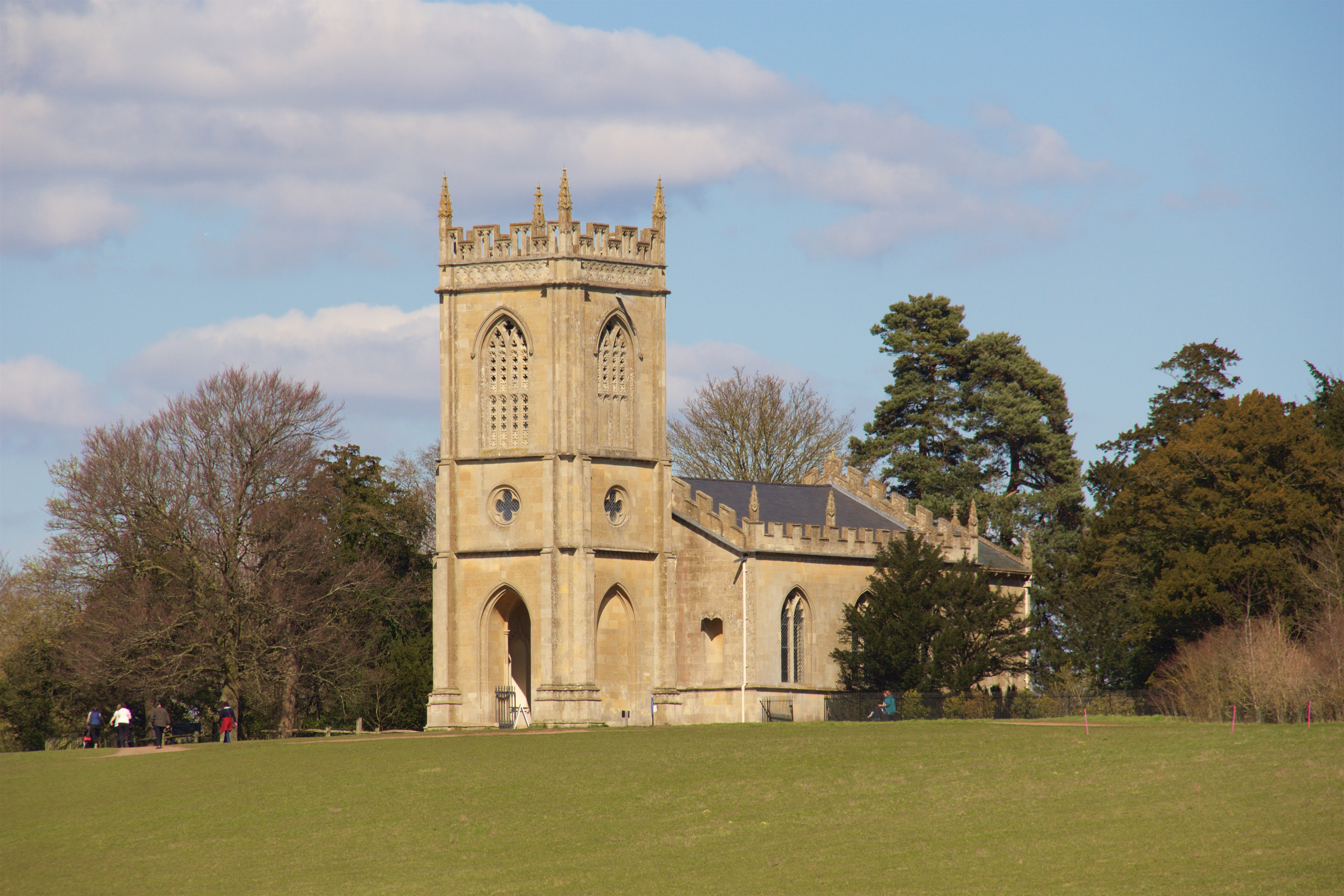
St Mary Magdalene's Church, Croome D'Abitot from the park

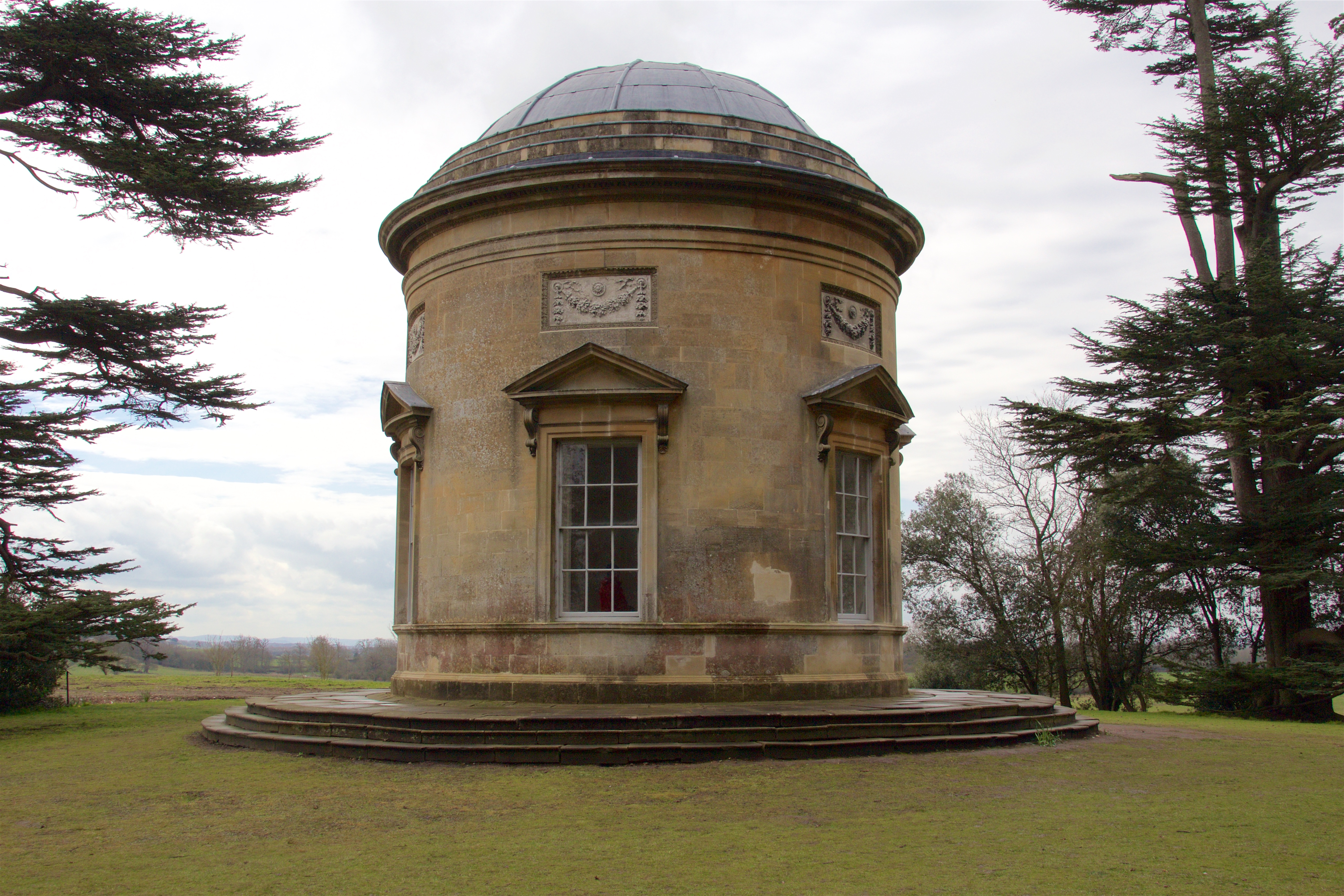
The Rotunda in 2016

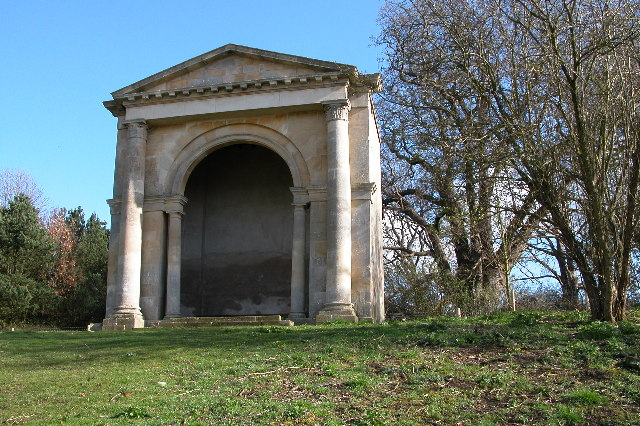
The Park Seat in 2005

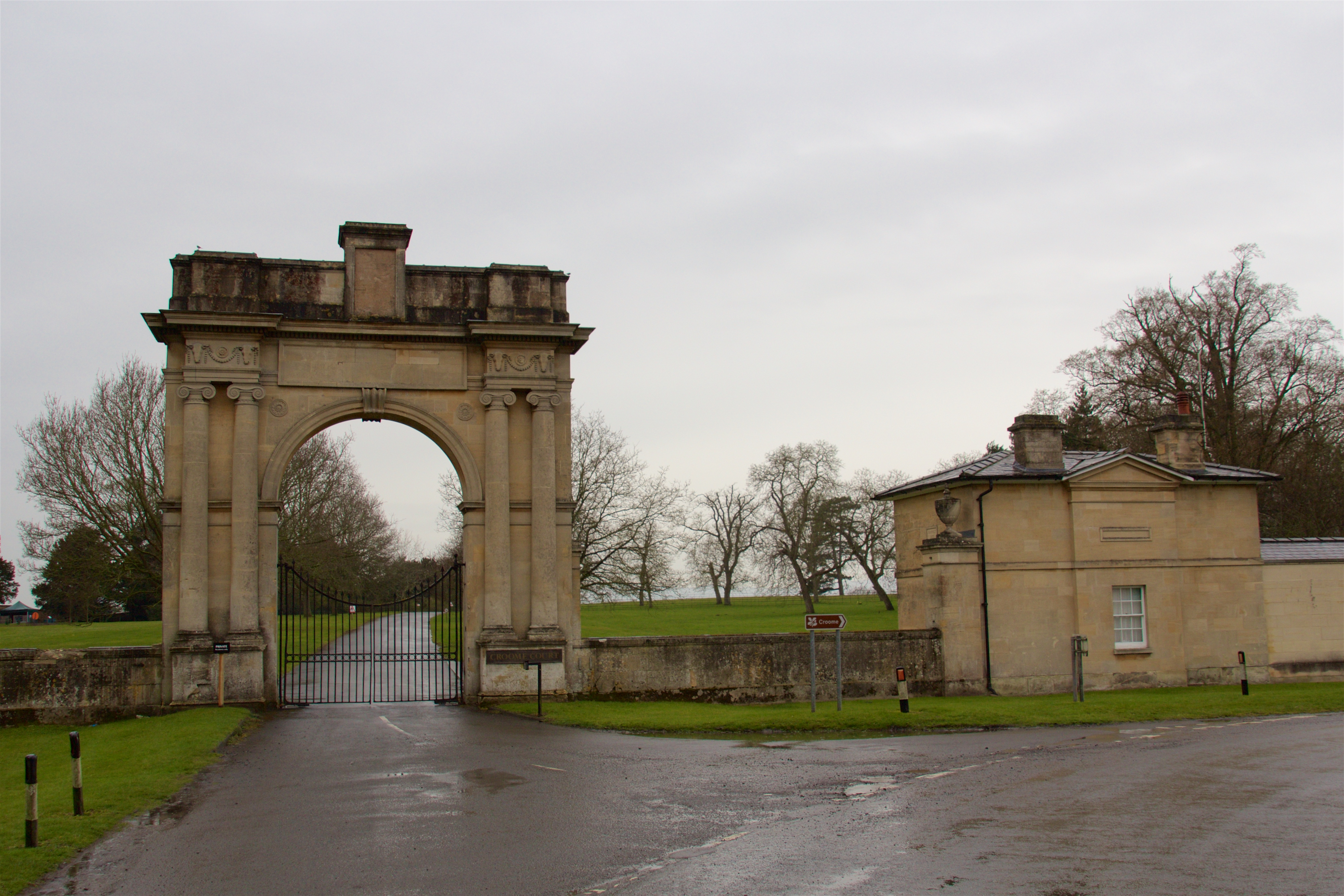
The London Arch in 2016

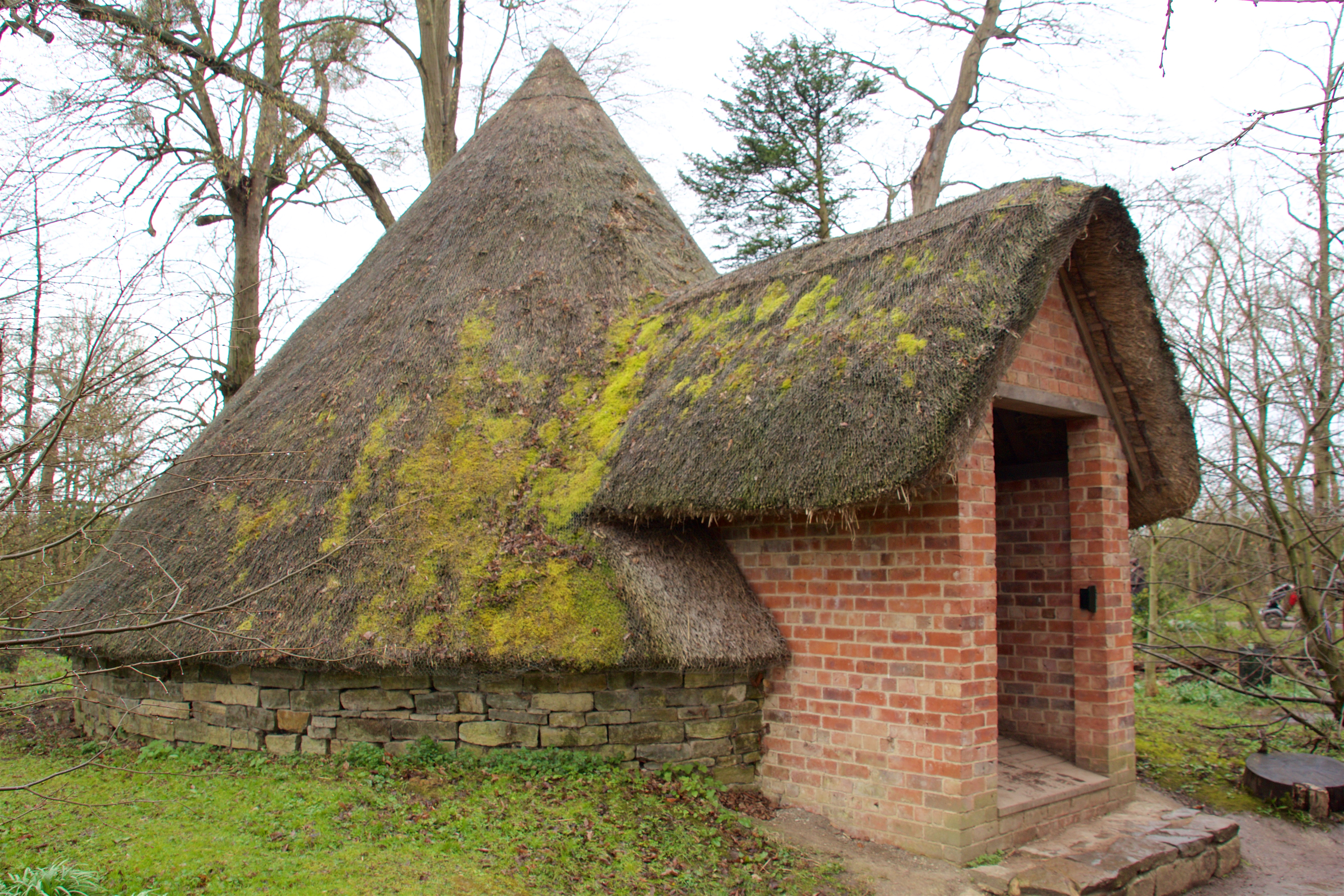
The ice house in 2016

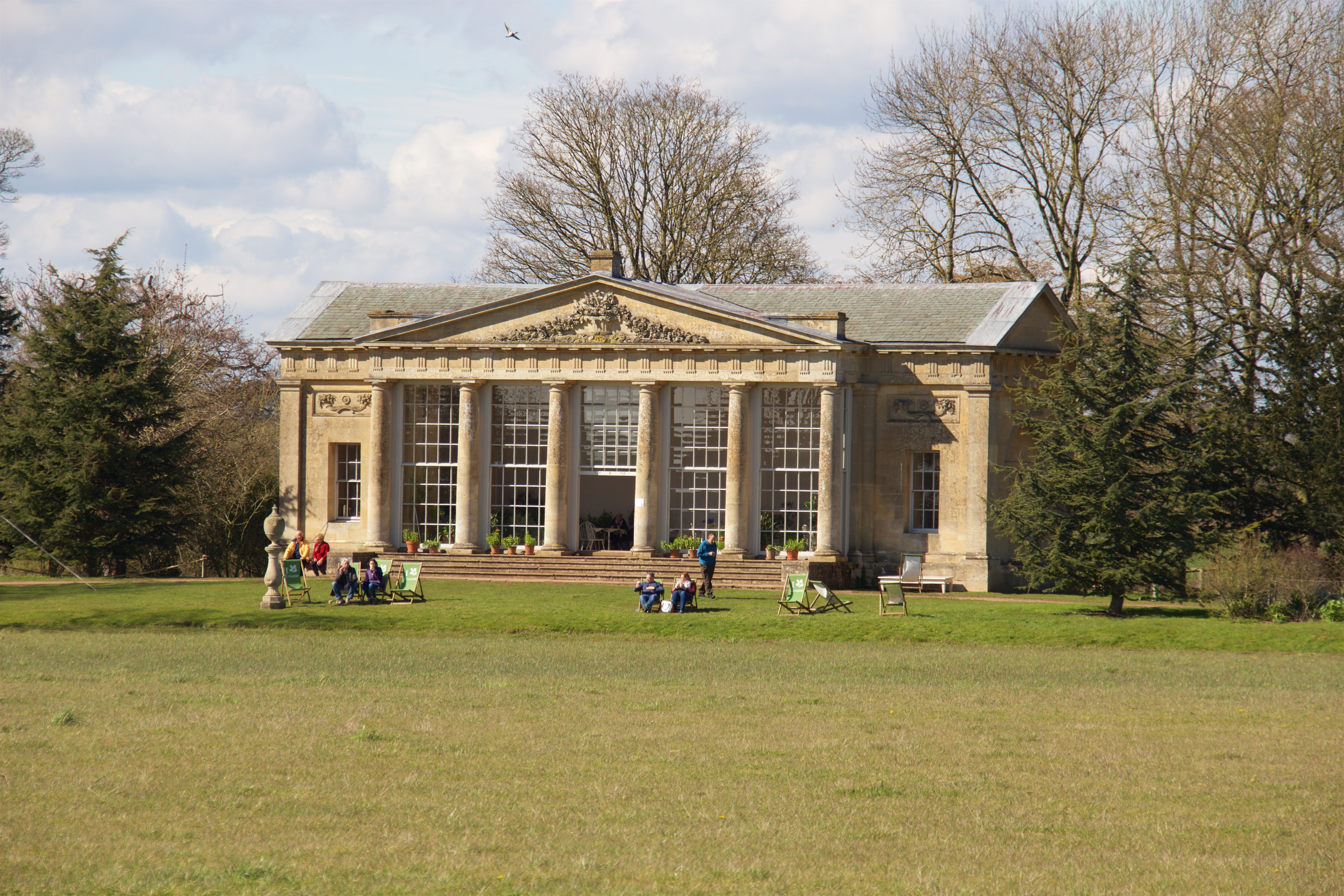
The Temple Greenhouse in 2016

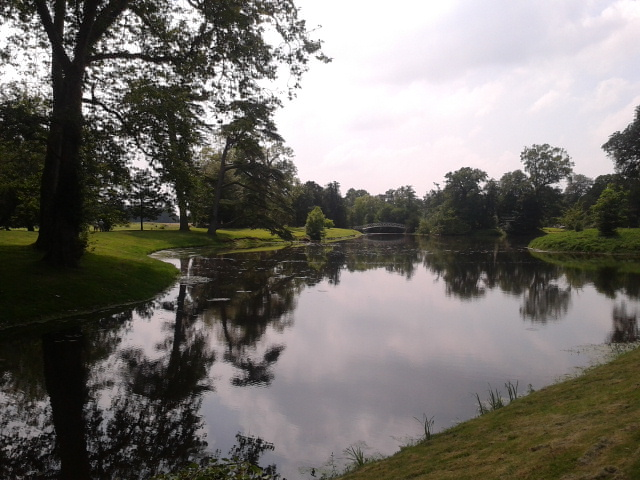
Croome lake in 2012, showing a footbridge and the islands

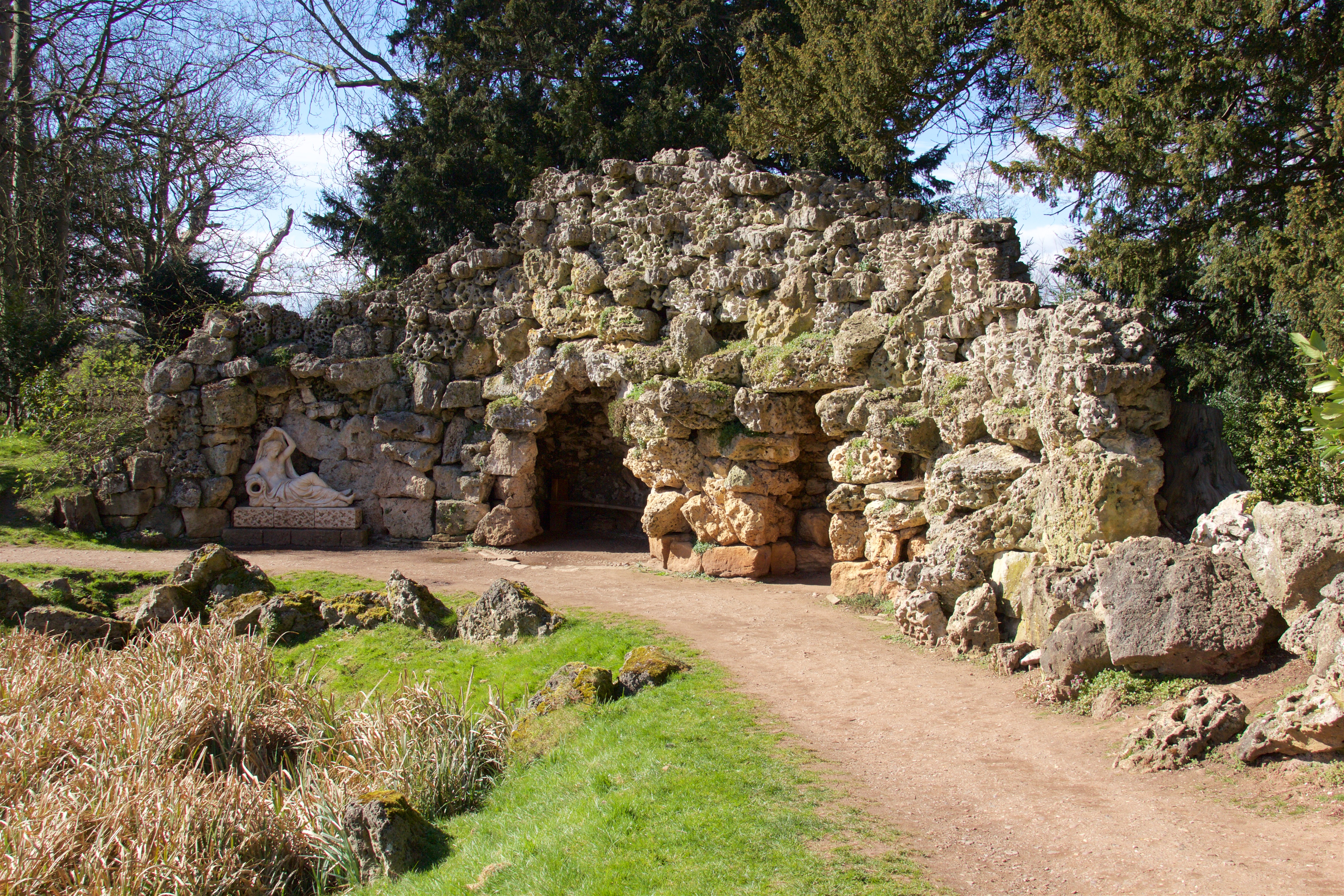
The Grotto in 2016

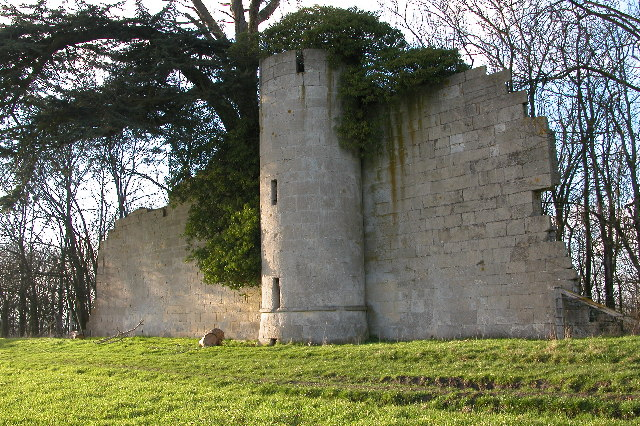
Pirton Castle

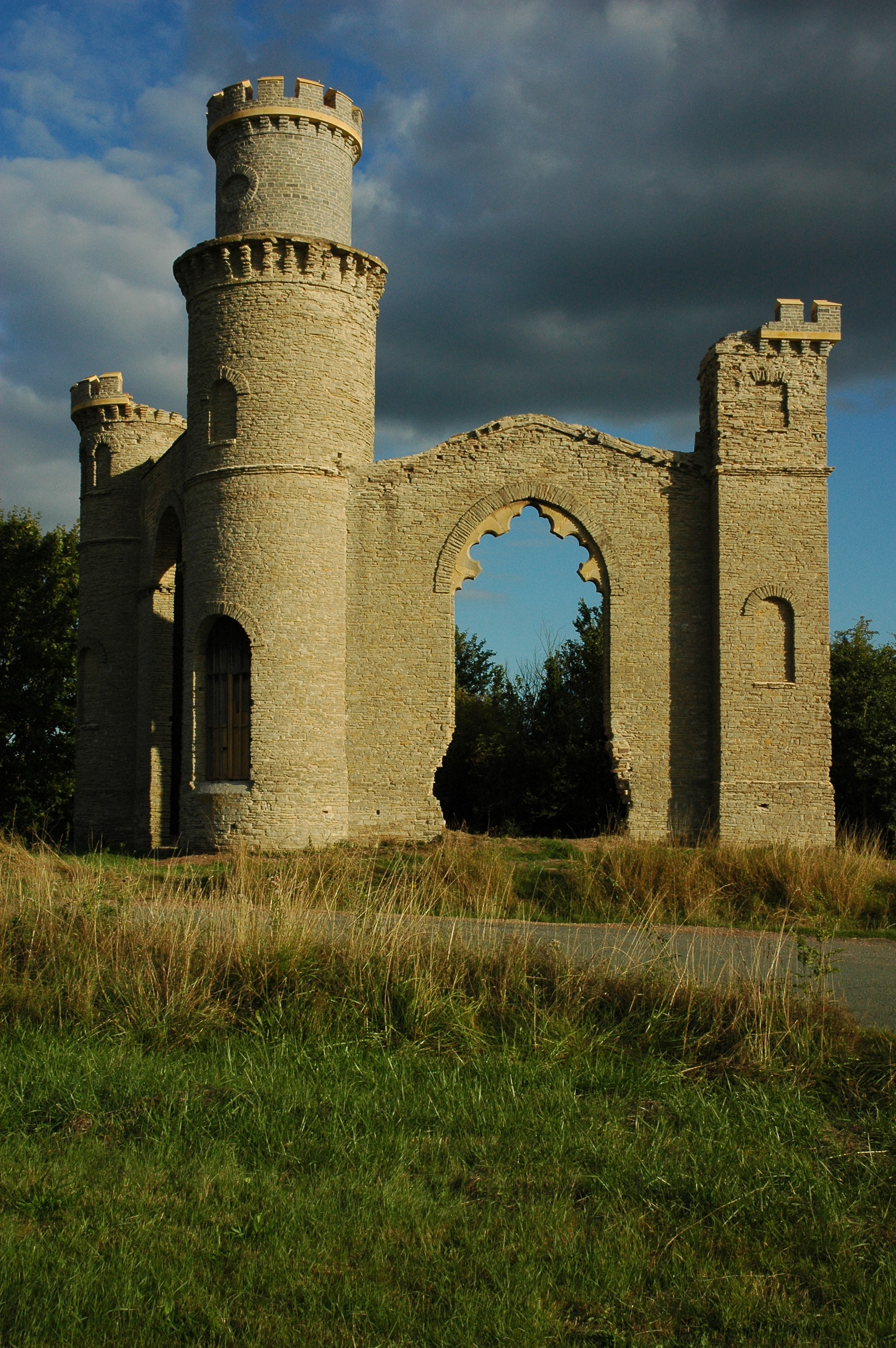
Dunstall Castle after restoration in 2010
