= Thomas Coventry, 2nd Earl of Coventry =

English peer

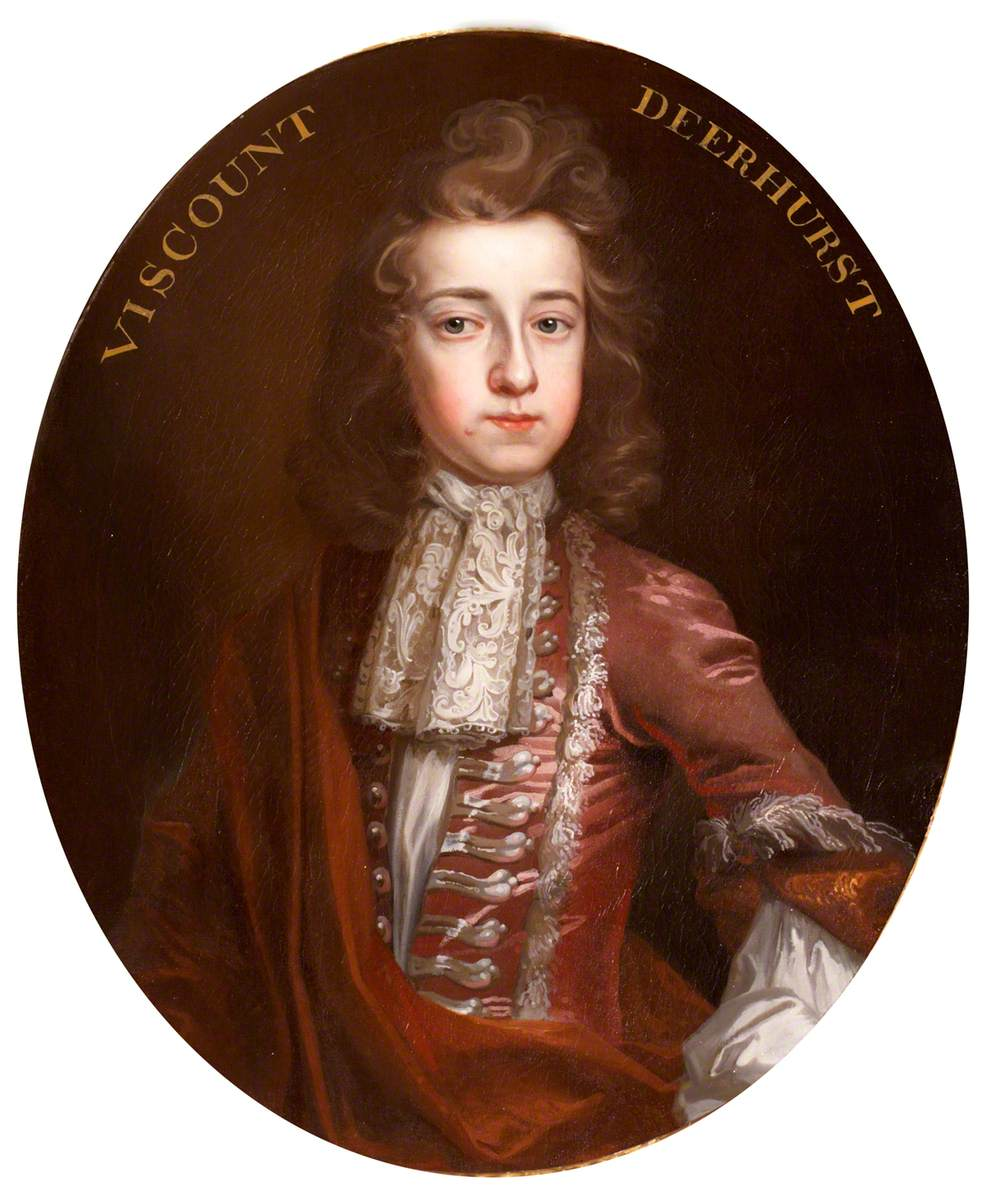

Thomas Coventry, 2nd Earl of Coventry (died August 1710) was an English peer and member of the House of Lords, styled Hon. Thomas Coventry from 1685 to 1697 and Viscount Deerhurst until 1699.

From 1690 to 1696, he was a deputy lieutenant of Worcestershire. He inherited the earldom from Thomas Coventry, 1st Earl of Coventry in 1699, and was shortly thereafter appointed Custos Rotulorum of Worcestershire, an office he held until his death in 1710. He was also Recorder of Coventry.

Coventry married Lady Anne Somerset, daughter of Henry Somerset, 1st Duke of Beaufort, by whom he had one son, Thomas Coventry, 3rd Earl of Coventry.

Honorary titles
Preceded by The Earl of Coventry	Custos Rotulorum of Worcestershire; 1699–1710	Succeeded by The Earl of Plymouth
Peerage of England
Preceded by Thomas Coventry	Earl of Coventry; 1699–1710	Succeeded by Thomas Coventry
