= Croome D'Abitot =

Village in Worcestershire, England

Coordinates: 52.102266°N 2.173062°W

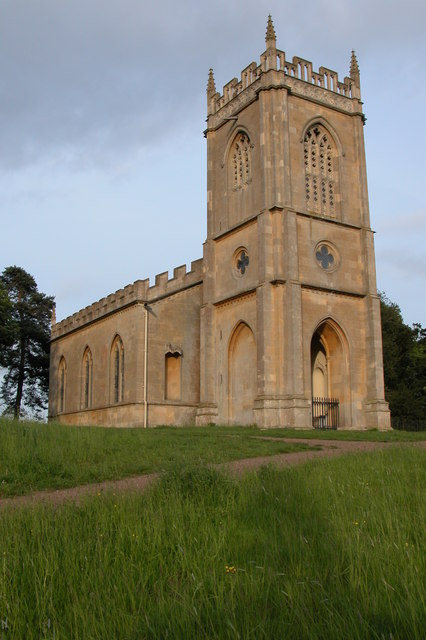
- Croome D'Abitot church

- Location within Worcestershire
- Civil parish: Croome D'Abitot
- District: Malvern Hills District
- Shire county: Worcestershire
- Region: West Midlands
- Country: England
- Sovereign state: United Kingdom
- Post town: Worcester
- Postcode district: WR8
- Police: West Mercia
- Fire: Hereford and Worcester
- Ambulance: West Midlands
- UK Parliament: West Worcestershire

Croome D'Abitot is a village and civil parish, which shares a joint parish council with Severn Stoke, in the Malvern Hills District in the county of Worcestershire, England. The parish church of St Mary Magdalene is situated in the grounds of Croome Court.

== History ==
Known today as Croome / Croome d'Abitot / Earl's Croome / Earls Croome, it is listed within the hundred of Oswaldslow in the historic county of Worcestershire as being land owned by the bishop of Worcester (St. Mary) in both 1066 and 1086. The first Norman sheriff of Worcester Urse d'Abetot, controlled many lands of the church. Through his daughter Emmeline, Urse is an ancestor of the Beauchamp family, who eventually became Earls of Warwick.

Croome D'Abitot was once part of the Royal forest of Horewell. The woodlands were mostly removed around the time of the Civil War.

Croome D'Abitot was the birthplace of the Anglican Bible commentator John Trapp.
