= Anne Coventry, Countess of Coventry (1691–1788) =

British noblewoman

Anne Coventry
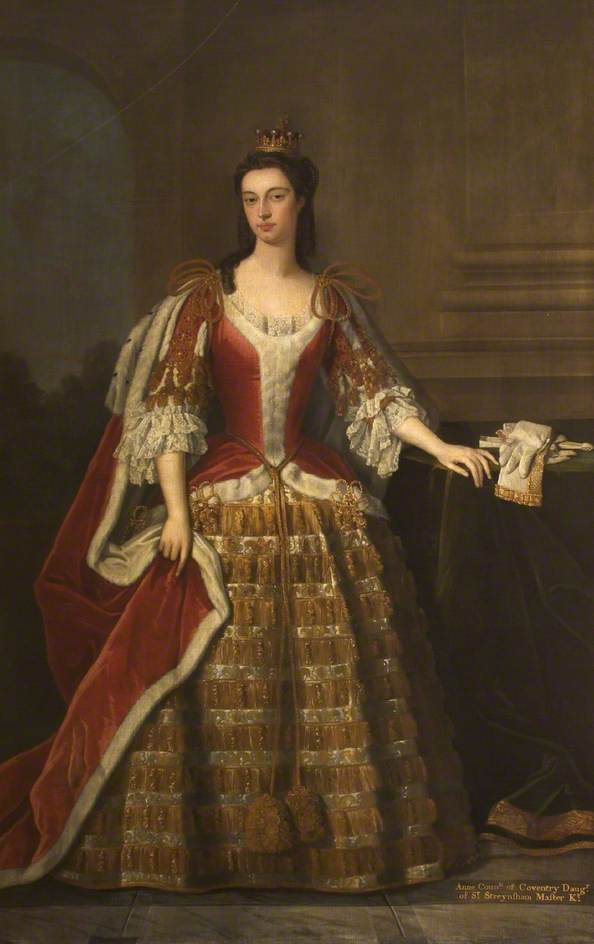
- Born: 21 August 1691
- Died: 21 March 1788 (aged 96); Holt Castle

Anne Coventry, Countess of Coventry or Anne Master (21 August 1691 – 21 March 1788) was a British noblewoman, who was a litigant over her inheritance.

== Life ==
Anne Master was the daughter of Streynsham Master of Codnor Castle in Derbyshire. In 1719 her new husband, Gilbert Coventry, 4th Earl of Coventry, died. He had been paid a large dowry with the stipulation that Anne would have a £500 widow's pension if he should die. In order to receive her inheritance she had to sue William Coventry, 5th Earl of Coventry. She won this case on 18 May 1724.

She married Edmund Pytts MP and died as his widow in Holt Castle in 1788 aged 96. She was buried with her husband in Holt, Worcestershire.
