= Anne Coventry, Countess of Coventry (1673–1763) =

British religious writer and noble

The Right Honourable The Countess of Coventry
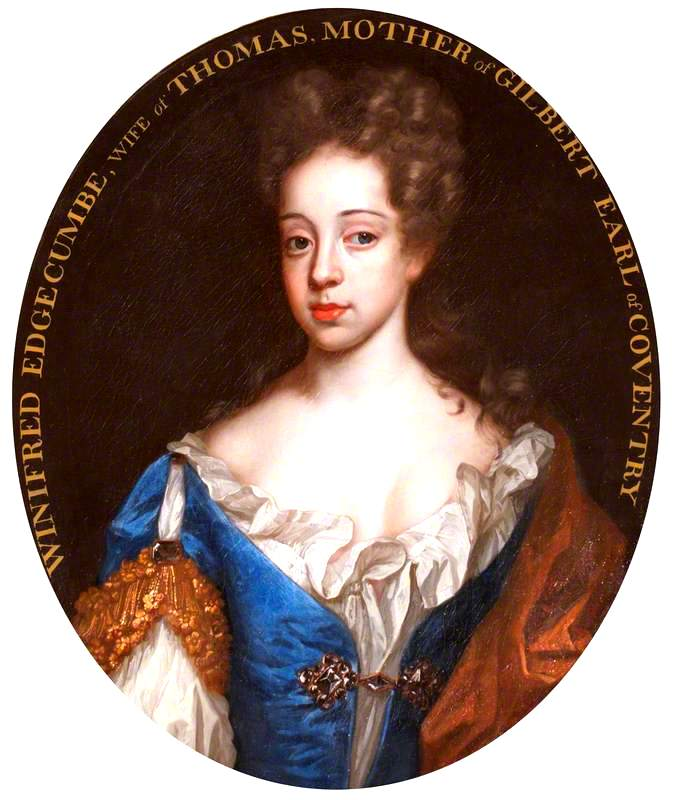
- Portrait by Godfrey Kneller
- Born: 22 July 1673
- Died: 14 February 1763 (aged 89); Snitterfield, Warwickshire, England
- Occupation: Writer
- Spouse: Thomas Coventry, 2nd Earl of Coventry

Anne Coventry, Countess of Coventry (née Lady Anne Somerset; 22 July 1673 – 14 February 1763), styled Viscountess Deerhurst from 1691–99, was a British religious writer and noble.

== Early life ==
Anne Somerset was born in 1673, the third daughter and youngest child of Henry Somerset, 3rd Marquess of Worcester and Mary Somerset (née Capell), a botanist and gardener. Her father became the first Duke of Beaufort in 1682. Her mother was the daughter of the 1st Baron Capell of Hadham and the widow of Henry Seymour, Lord Beauchamp (1626–1654), son of the Duke of Somerset. William Seymour, 3rd Duke of Somerset (1652–1675) and Elizabeth Bruce, Countess of Ailesbury (died 1697) were Anne's half-siblings from her mother's first marriage.

At 17, Lady Anne married Thomas Coventry, 2nd Earl of Coventry in 1691; that same year, she was painted by Godfrey Kneller.

== Writing and charitable activities ==
Lady Coventry was noted for her benevolence and piety as well as her interest in education for women. In 1709, she helped found Mary Astell's Charity School for Girls in Chelsea, in association with the Society for Promoting Christian Knowledge. She was a close friend of Mary Astell, a feminist, with whom she shared many views. It is possible Lady Coventry was involved with Jacobite activities along with Astell and her own elder sister Mary Butler, Duchess of Ormonde, but was never publicly accused of it. In her will, she strongly attested her allegiance to the Church of England.

In 1707, her book The Right Honourable Anne, countess of Coventry's meditations and reflections, moral and divine was published. Her book was republished in 1727. Contemporary biographies note that she was a pious and well-read woman who was an "enthusiastic collector of books" which she kept in her own library.

She was also among the subscribers to George Ballard's 1752 Memoirs of Several Ladies of Great Britain, who have been Celebrated for their Writings or Skill in the Learned Languages, Arts and Sciences. In addition to religious texts, the catalog of her library showed an interest in contemporary works through a large collection of plays, including some rather racy comedies. According to Emma Major in the Oxford Dictionary of National Biography, these racy plays reveal a "sophisticated broad-mindedness that reflects her involvement with fashionable life. It also perhaps hints at the pleasure in life that prompted her to tease Astell about her tendency to gloom."

== Marriage and family ==
Lord Coventry died in August 1710, leaving her with significant debts that she managed to repay over the years before her death. They had one child, a son, who died shortly after his father:

- Thomas Coventry, 3rd Earl of Coventry (7 April 1702 – 28 January 1712). He died at Eton College, age 9.

The Countess never remarried. She died in 1763 at her country house in Snitterfield, Warwickshire.
