= List of churches preserved by the Churches Conservation Trust in the English Midlands =

List of English church buildings

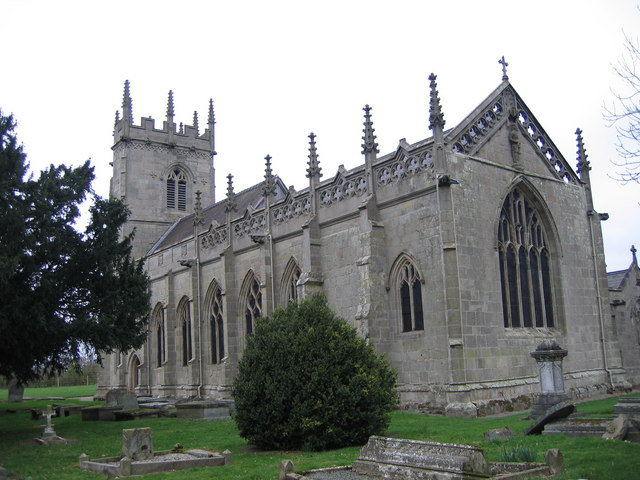
St Mary Magdalene's Church, Battlefield

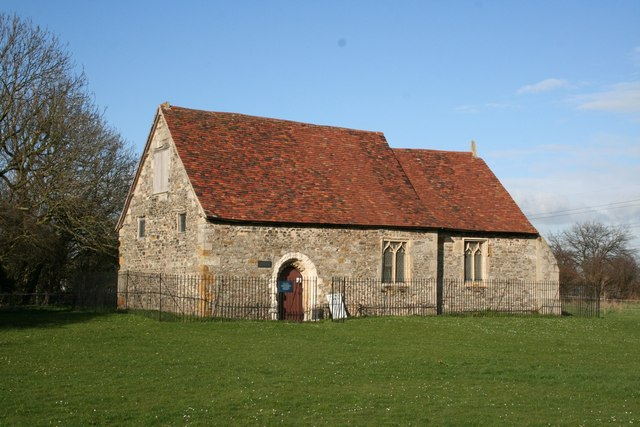
Elston Chapel

The Churches Conservation Trust, which was initially known as the Redundant Churches Fund, is a charity whose purpose is to protect historic churches at risk, those that have been made redundant by the Church of England. The Trust was established by the Pastoral Measure of 1968. The legally defined object of the Trust is "the preservation, in the interests of the nation and the Church of England, of churches and parts of churches of historic and archaeological interest or architectural quality vested in the Fund ... together with their contents so vested". The charity cares for over 350 churches. The Trust is financed partly by the Department for Culture, Media and Sport and the Church Commissioners, but grants from those bodies were frozen in 2001, since when additional funding has come from other sources, including the general public. In the 12 months ending 31 March 2010 the charity's income was £6,161,653, and its spending was £6,035,871. During that year it had 44 employees, and used the services of 2,000 volunteers. The charity is run by a board of trustees, who delegate the day-to-day management to a chief executive and his senior management team.

The Trust's primary aim is to ensure that the buildings in its care are weatherproof and to prevent any deterioration in their condition. The majority of the churches remain consecrated, and are used often for occasional services where this is practical, while some are venues for concerts and other purposes. Local communities are encouraged to use them for appropriate activities and events, and the buildings provide an educational resource centre, allowing children and young people to study history and architecture. Nearly 2 million people visit the Trust's churches each year.

This list describes the 74 churches preserved by the Churches Conservation Trust in the English Midlands, consisting of those in the counties of Derbyshire, Nottinghamshire, Shropshire, Staffordshire, Leicestershire, Rutland, Herefordshire, Worcestershire, Warwickshire, Northamptonshire, and Gloucestershire. The ages of the churches spread from St Andrew's Church, Wroxeter, which contains fabric from the Anglo-Saxon period, to St John the Baptist's Church, Avon Dassett, which was built in 1868; most of the churches date from the 12th and 13th centuries. All the churches have been designated by English Heritage as listed buildings, almost all of them at the higher Grades (I and II*). Some of the churches stand in the centres of cities or towns, and their functions have been taken over by nearby churches; these include St Peter's Church, Northampton, All Saints Church, Leicester, St Mary's Church, Shrewsbury, St Nicholas' Church, Gloucester, St Swithun's Church, Worcester, and St Werburgh's Church, Derby. Others stand in remote or isolated positions in the countryside. Some of these became unused because the village they served was deserted, or the local population moved elsewhere; examples of these include St Cuthbert's Church, Holme Lacy, St Bartholomew's Church, Furtho, Pendock Church, and St Peter's Church, Wolfhampcote. In other cases the church served the estate of a country house and it is no longer used for that purpose; examples include All Saints Church, Kedleston, St Andrew's Church, Cranford, and Withcote Chapel. In some cases only part of the church has been conserved. Only the tower of St Oswald's Church, Lassington has survived, the body of St Mary's Church, Brentingby has been converted into a house, leaving the preserved tower, and in the case of St Werburgh's Church, Derby, the tower and former chancel are preserved, while the rest of the church has been converted for commercial use.

== Key ==
Explanation of the three listed building grades
Grade	Criteria
I	Buildings of exceptional interest, sometimes considered to be internationally important
II*	Particularly important buildings of more than special interest
II	Buildings of national importance and special interest

== Churches ==
List of the churches with photographs, locations, year or era of construction and listed building grade
Name and town or village	County and coordinates	Photograph	Date^{[A]}	Notes	Grade
St Andrew, Wroxeter	Shropshire; 52.6701°N 2.6472°W	The nave of a stone church seen from the southwest, containing three pointed windows and a small porch, with a battlemented tower beyond	Anglo-Saxon	The church is built on the site of the former Roman town of Viroconium. It dates back to the Anglo-Saxon period, and contains large stones which came from the public buildings of the Roman town. Additions and alterations were made to it from the 12th to the 19th centuries, but by the end of the 19th century most of the local people had moved away. Its font was constructed from the base of a former Roman column.	I
Holy Trinity, Blatherwycke	Northamptonshire; 52.5510°N 0.5645°W		11th century	Holy Trinity Church stands in the grounds of the demolished Blatherwycke Hall. As a result of additions and alterations made between the medieval period and later, most of its architecture is Gothic, but it still retains Norman features, including two doorways, a bell opening, the tower arch, and the arcades.	II*
St Nicholas, Littleborough	Nottinghamshire; 53.3341°N 0.7633°W	A small, simple stone church. On the left is the nave with a bellcote at the far end, and on the right a smaller chancel	11th century	The church is built close to a ford crossing the River Trent on the Roman road between Lincoln and York. It is a simple church in Norman style, and has been little altered since, other than the addition of a vestry in 1832 and restorations in the 19th and 20th centuries.	I
St Michael, Tretire with Michaelchurch	Herefordshire; 51.9261°N 2.6973°W	A small, simple, stone church with a stone slate roof, a bellcote with a pyramidal roof, a porch and small windows, seen from the southwest	1056 (?)	Standing in an isolated position in a field, this is a Norman church with a simple plan. It contains 13th-century wall paintings, and a reconstructed Roman altar.	I
St Oswald (tower), Lassington	Gloucestershire; 51.8887°N 2.2978°W	A plain tower with a pyramidal roof, a small lancet window, and a small louvred bell opening	Late 11th century	The Norman tower is the only remaining part of the church, which was originally a chapel of St Oswald's Priory in Gloucester. In 1875 all the church, except for the tower, was demolished and rebuilt, but its fabric deteriorated during the 20th century. The church became redundant in 1972 and, apart from the tower, it was demolished in 1975.	II*
St Bartholomew (old), Lower Sapey	Worcestershire; 52.2392°N 2.4418°W	Part of the south face of a small stone church, seen from an angle, with tiled roofs and a gabled, wooden porch	Early 12th century	This simple church stands on a steep bank above a stream at the end of a winding lane. It was replaced in 1877 by another church with the same dedication in a nearby village. The building was then neglected, and it was used at one time as a farm building. Since 1990 it has been repaired, and is a Scheduled Ancient Monument.	II*
St Peter, Northampton	Northamptonshire; 52.2365°N 0.9034°W		1130–40	St Peter's stands in the town of Northampton and contains some fine Norman architecture. It was restored in the 1850s by George Gilbert Scott, and in 1878–79 his son, John Oldrid Scott, carried out a scheme of decoration using stencils. Since the church was closed in 1995, damage caused by excessive condensation has been repaired.	I
St Mary the Virgin, Ayston	Rutland; 52.5997°N 0.7325°W	A stone church with a battlemented tower	12th century	Alterations and additions were made in the 13th, 14th and 15th centuries, and most of the church is in Perpendicular style. In the church are remnants of walls paintings, some 15th-century stained glass, and a memorial with worn effigies.	II*
Holy Cross, Burley	Rutland; 52.6824°N 0.6952°W	The east end of a stone church is seen through a graveyard from the north. On the right is a battlemented tower and the nave extends to the left	12th century	Holy Trinity Church is built in stone of differing colours, and in different architectural styles; for example, the north arcade is Norman and the south arcade is Gothic. In the church is a memorial by Chantrey to Lady Charlotte Finch, who had been governess to the children of George III.	II*
All Saints, Chadshunt	Warwickshire; 52.1744°N 1.4906°W	Part of a stone church seen from an angle. At the far end is a battlemented tower, in front of which is a nave with a flat parapet, and part of a chancel with a tiled roof	12th century	The church is "long, low and massive", and includes Norman and Gothic features. The nave dates from the mid-12th century, the clerestory from the 15th century, the tower from the 17th century, and the chancel and north transept from about 1730.	II*
St Michael, Cotham	Nottinghamshire; 53.0200°N 0.8175°W	A stone church with a red tiled roof seen from the southeast. It has a south porch and a louvred belfry at the west end; there is no external division between the nave and the chancel	12th century	Following additions and alterations in the 14th and 15th centuries, the tower and the west end of the nave were demolished in the 18th century. Some of the windows contain Decorated tracery; the tracery in other windows is Perpendicular. Inside the church are corbels with medieval carvings, and partly hidden 14th-century memorials.	II*
St Michael and St Martin, Eastleach Martin	Gloucestershire; 51.7453°N 1.7085°W	A stone church seen from the north, with the chancel to the left, a transept protruding forwards, and a low tower to the right	12th century	The church has a Norman doorway, while its windows contain different types of Gothic tracery. John Keble, later a founding member of the Oxford Movement, was a curate to the church.	I
Elston Chapel, Elston	Nottinghamshire; 53.0263°N 0.8647°W	A small, simple stone church with a red tiled roof. On the left is the nave with a round-headed doorway, and to the right is the smaller chancel	12th century	A small building standing in a field, this former parish church is distinguished by a Norman south doorway, and by layers of paintings on its internal walls.	I
St Gregory, Fledborough	Nottinghamshire; 53.2406°N 0.7847°W	A stone church seen from the southwest, in the foreground a large, squat tower with a pyramidal roof, and the body of the church extending behind it	12th century	The lower part of the tower dates from the 12th century, but much of the rest of the church is from the 14th century. Repairs were carried out in 1764, 1890 and 1912. In 1820, Thomas Arnold, later headmaster of Rugby School, was married in the church.	I
St Bartholomew, Furtho	Northamptonshire; 52.0808°N 0.8728°W		12th century	Dating from the 12th century, the church served a village that became deserted when the road from London to Northampton was diverted away from it. The church closed in 1920, and was used for storage of the archives of the Northampton Record Society during the Second World War, when its windows were destroyed by a bomb.	II*
All Saints, Kedleston	Derbyshire; 52.9592°N 1.5367°W	A stone church seen from the east. It has a three-light east window, over which is a sundial, and beyond it is a battlemented tower	12th century	The church stands adjacent to Kedleston Hall, which has been occupied by the Curzon family for over 700 years. When the present hall was built in 1759, the area occupied by the village of Kedleston was replaced by parkland. Inside the church are 35 monuments to the Curzon family.	I
All Saints, Leicester	Leicestershire; 52.6351°N 1.1409°W		12th century	When the church was built, it stood at the heart of the city, but later businesses and people moved to other parts of the city. By the 19th century its fabric had deteriorated, and a series of repairs and restorations was carried out. In the 1960s the church became isolated by a new road system, and it closed in 1982.	I
St Leonard, Linley	Shropshire; 52.5834°N 2.4639°W	A stone church showing the squat tower with a pyramidal roof, and part of the nave	12th century	Originally a chapel of ease to Holy Trinity, Much Wenlock, it was built in the 12th century, with the tower added later in that century. Its architectural style is almost all Norman, and it has a simple plan, consisting of a nave, a chancel, and a west tower. The church was restored by Arthur Blomfield in 1858. It is constructed in local sandstone, and has tiled roofs.	I
St Mary, Little Washbourne	Gloucestershire; 51.9994°N 2.0172°W	A very small church seen from the south, with the nave on the left, a smaller chapel to the right, and at the west end of the chancel, a bellcote	12th century	St Mary's is a simple church, consisting of a nave and a chancel. Alterations were made to it in the 18th century. It contains box pews and an octagonal pulpit with a sounding board.	II*
St John the Baptist, Llanrothal	Herefordshire; 51.8633°N 2.7701°W	A small church with nave, chancel and porch but no tower	12th century	The church stands in a remote position close to the Wales–England border overlooking the River Monnow. It contains a Norman window, and elsewhere the architectural style is Gothic. The chancel and vestry were restored in the 20th century.	II*
St Nicholas of Myra, Ozleworth	Gloucestershire; 51.6380°N 2.2987°W	A small stone church seen from the southeast, with a central tower capped by a pyramidal roof. The chancel extends forwards and beyond the tower is the gabled south porch	12th century	This is one of only two churches in Gloucestershire with a hexagonal tower. The tower is Norman in style and probably dates from the 12th century. The chancel and nave were added during the following century. There are fragments of medieval stained glass in the east window.	II*
Pendock Church, Pendock	Worcestershire; 52.0014°N 2.2679°W	The stone tower of a church seen from the west, with a pyramidal roof, standing between trees. The body of the church can just be seen beyond the tower	12th century	Pendock Church stands in an isolated position overlooking the M50 motorway. To its north are the earthworks of a former medieval village. Alterations and additions were made in the 14th century and again in the 15th century, when the west tower was built.	I
St Peter and St Paul, Preston Deanery	Northamptonshire; 52.1937°N 0.8481°W	A stone church seen from the east, partly obscured by trees, with a battlemented parapet at the back	12th century	The church fell into disuse after the Reformation. It became a ruin, and was partly demolished; the chancel was used as a dog kennel, and the tower as a pigeon house. It was extensively repaired in about 1622, and further repairs and restorations have been carried out since then.	II*
St Martin, Preston Gubbals	Shropshire; 52.7717°N 2.7546°W	A small, simple stone church seen from the southeast	12th century	What now remains was originally the chancel of a medieval parish church. A new church was added to it in 1866, most of which was demolished in 1973, leaving the present single-cell building. Many of the carved wooden fittings in the church were made by Rev E. D. Poole, the vicar of the church in the 19th century.	II*
St Bartholomew, Richard's Castle	Herefordshire; 52.3282°N 2.7581°W	Part of a stone church, showing the nave on the left and part of the chancel to the right	12th century	The church stands close to the castle and the village, both of which are named Richard's Castle, near to the Wales–England border. The tower is detached from the main body of the church, and is separately designated as a Grade I listed building.	I
St Mary, Shrewsbury	Shropshire; 52.7087°N 2.7513°W	The tower of a church with a tall spire. The lower part of the tower is in red sandstone, the upper part and the spire are in a grey stone	12th century	St Mary's is the largest church in Shrewsbury. It originated as a collegiate church in the 12th century. Additions and alterations were made during the following centuries. In about 1792 a major restoration was carried out by Thomas Telford. The top fell from the spire in 1894, and this was repaired by John Oldrid Scott. The church was declared redundant in 1987.	I
St James, Stirchley	Shropshire; 52.6573°N 2.4452°W		12th century	The chancel is built in sandstone and is in Norman style, while the nave and tower, which are enclosed in brick, are Georgian. Both the church and its churchyard are designated as Scheduled ancient monuments.	I
St Cosmas and St Damian, Stretford	Herefordshire; 52.1971°N 2.8156°W	A stone church with a tiled roof seen from the south. On the left gable is a shingled bellcote, and a wooden porch protrudes from the church	12th century	The church is dedicated to the patron saints of physicians and surgeons. It is almost as wide as it is long, and consists of two naves and two chancels in parallel under a single roof, and a south porch.	I
St Michael, Upton	Northamptonshire; 52.2356°N 0.9508°W	A stone church with a tower on the right. This has a battlemented parapet beyond which is a small pyramidal roof.gabled porch and a chancel to the right	12th century	St Michael's stands adjacent to the grounds of the former Upton Hall, and was originally a private chapel to the lord of the manor. It continued to be a chapel of ease to St Peter's Church, Northampton, until 1966. Upton Hall is now occupied by Quinton House School, which helps with the upkeep of the church.	I
St Michael, Upton Cressett	Shropshire; 52.5289°N 2.5085°W	A small church seen from the south. On the left is the short nave on top of which is a bellcote with a pyramidal tower, and on the right is the chancel	12th century	Standing on a remote hillside, the church includes features of Norman architecture such as the south doorway, the arcade of the former north aisle (which has been demolished), the chancel arch, and some of the windows. It also contains a wall painting dating from about 1200.	II
St John the Baptist, Wakerley	Northamptonshire; 52.5823°N 0.5894°W	A stone church seen from the east, with a Perpendicular east window, and the end of the south aisle, the tower and spire visible beyond	12th century	The church stands in an elevated position overlooking the Welland Valley. Most of its architecture is Gothic in style, but it contains a Norman chancel arch with fine capitals, and some corbels.	I
St Mary, Wormsley	Herefordshire; 52.1255°N 2.8377°W	A small simple church seen from the south, with thin windows, a porch, a bellcote at the west end, and a short chancel	12th century	Set in hilly countryside, this simple church has a Norman nave, doorway and font. The bellcote was added in the 13th century, and the chancel was probably rebuilt in the 19th century.	II*
Yatton Chapel, Yatton	Herefordshire; 51.9708°N 2.5444°W	A small single-cell chapel, with a round-headed doorway and a wooden bellcote with a pyramidal roof on the west end	12th century	This was originally a parish church that closed in 1841 when a new church was built on a different site. It stands at the end of a winding lane close to a farmhouse. Its basic architectural style is Norman, with alterations in the 13th century and later; the bellcote was added in about 1600.	II*
St Peter, Allexton	Leicestershire; 52.5953°N 0.7944°W	A stone church seen from the southeast with a south porch and a battlemented tower with a spirelet and weathervane	c. 1160	The north arcade is in Norman style, while the south arcade is Gothic. The tower was added in the 15th century. The aisles were demolished in the 16th century, but rebuilt as part of a restoration in 1862–63.	II*
All Saints, Shorncote	Gloucestershire; 51.6693°N 1.9649°W	A very small stone church seen from the south with a prominent doorway, and a smaller chancel towards the right	c. 1170	The church originates from about 1170 and was built in Norman style. Alterations in Gothic style were made in the 14th century, when a bellcote was also added. It was restored by William Butterfield in 1883. Inside the church is a Norman font and medieval wall paintings.	II*
St Andrew, Cranford St Andrew	Northamptonshire; 52.3857°N 0.6440°W	A stone church seen from the south, with a tower surmounted by a battlemented parapet on the left, and the nave with a porch and the chancel to the right	Late 12th century	St Andrew's stands in the grounds of Cranford Hall, and contains a Norman north arcade. Additions were made during the later centuries in Gothic style. A north transept was built in 1847 to accommodate a family pew for the occupants of the hall.	II*
St Nicholas, Gloucester	Gloucestershire; 51.8685°N 2.2492°W	A stone church in a town seen from the southeast. At the far end is a large tower surmounted by a truncated spire with pinnacles and, at the top, a ball finial	c. 1190	Built towards the end of the 12th century, the church was largely rebuilt during the following century, retaining some of its Norman features. The tower and spire were added in the 15th century, but the spire sustained a direct hit by cannon fire in 1643 during the Civil War. It was reduced in height and capped in 1783, the truncated spire becoming a landmark in the city. The church was repaired following a fire in 1901, the tower was stabilised in 1927, and the north aisle was rebuilt in 1935–38.	I
St Mary, Garthorpe	Leicestershire; 52.7796°N 0.7686°W	A stone church seen from the south with a belittlemented tower to the left and a smaller chancel to the right	Early 13th century	The church contains a Norman north arcade, with later Gothic additions, including a Perpendicular tower. Since being declared redundant, it has been found necessary to repair the north aisle.	I
All Saints, Aldwincle	Northamptonshire; 52.4223°N 0.5145°W	The tower of a stone church, seen from the west, at the top of which is a battlemented parapet with pinnacles. In front of the church and to the left is a lychgate	13th century	Originating in the 13th century, additions were made during the following two centuries, including a chantry chapel for the Chambre family in 1488–89. It has been disused as a church since the 1890s and was declared redundant in 1976, since when it has been used as an architectural museum.	I
St Swithun, Brookthorpe	Gloucestershire; 51.8084°N 2.2400°W	A stone church seen from the southeast, showing the chancel, beyond which is a nave with a higher roof and a porch and, beyond that, a tower with a saddleback roof	13th century	Dating from the 13th century, the church has a tower with a saddleback roof. The north aisle was added in 1892. In the porch is a chronogram hiding the date of the execution of Charles I. Inside the church is a memorial to the architect Detmar Blow consisting of a carving by Eric Gill.	II*
St Michael and All Angels, Brownsover	Warwickshire; 52.3920°N 1.2540°W	A plain stone church, seen from the southwest, with a bell hanging from a gabled bracket on the west wall	13th century	The church originated as a chapel of ease. Following additions in the 13th–15th centuries, it was almost completely rebuilt by Sir George Gilbert Scott for Allesley Boughton-Leigh of Brownsover Hall. Inside the church, the organ case was made in 1660 for St John's College, Cambridge, and moved here in the late 19th century.	II*
St James, Charfield	Gloucestershire; 51.6180°N 2.4073°W	A stone church seen from the north with a central doorway surmounted by a pierced parapet, and to the right a battlemented tower	13th century	Originating in the 13th century, the church was largely rebuilt in the 15th century, financed by money from the wool trade. In the 18th century the industry moved away from area around the church, leaving it isolated. The church has a castellated tower with a saddleback roof.	I
St Peter, Deene	Northamptonshire; 52.5243°N 0.5984°W	A stone church with a tower and spire, seen from the southwest	13th century	In the 16th century, St Peter's became the estate church of the Brudenell family, who bought Deene Park. In 1869 much of the church was rebuilt by T. H. Wyatt. G. F. Bodley furnished and decorated the chancel in 1890.	II*
St Michael and All Angels, Edmondthorpe	Leicestershire; 52.7488°N 0.7302°W	A stone church seen from the south. On the left is a battlemented tower with a semicircular stair turret, in the middle is the nave with a clerestory and a porch, and to the right at a lower level is the chancel	13th century	The tower and chancel date from the 13th century, the aisles were added in the 14th century, and in the following century the clerestory was built and the height of the chancel was raised. Further alterations took place during the 19th century.	I
St Cuthbert, Holme Lacy	Herefordshire; 52.0094°N 2.6301°W	A stone church seen from the southwest, with a tower on the left, and a gabled south aisle and a porch on the right	13th century	The church now stands in an isolated position and it is thought that it originally served a village which became deserted. It then became the estate church of the Scudamore family living nearby at Holme Lacy House. Its fabric originates from the 13th century, but the tower was added in the 14th century, and a chapel and porch during the following century.	I
St Wilfrid, Low Marnham	Nottinghamshire; 53.2155°N 0.7933°W	A stone church seen from the southwest. On the left is the tower with a battlemented parapet and pinnacles, in the centre is the nave, also battlemented, and to the right at a lower level is the chancel	13th century	Additions and alterations were made to the church in the 14th, 15th and 19th centuries. The arcades differ in that the north arcade is carried on low cylindrical pillars with circular capitals, while the south arcade has taller octagonal pillars with detached shafts.	I
St Arild, Oldbury-on-the-Hill	Gloucestershire; 51.5926°N 2.2630°W	A stone church seen from the northwest. The tower is battlemented, and the relatively small plain body of the church extends beyond it	13th century	This is one of only two churches dedicated to Saint Arild. It is approached across fields or through a farmyard. Most of its fabric dates from the 15th or early 16th century and is in Perpendicular style.	II*
St Martin of Tours, Saundby	Nottinghamshire; 53.3828°N 0.8206°W	A stone church seen from the southeast, entirely battlemented, with pinnacles on the chancel and the tower	13th century	The north arcade dates from the 13th century, the tower was built in 1504, and additions and alterations were made in the 14th, 15th and 16th centuries. Restorations were carried out in the 19th century. The stained glass includes a series of windows by the Kempe studio.	I
St Mary, Shipton Solars	Gloucestershire; 51.8649°N 1.9560°W	A small, simple church seen from a distance showing the nave with a single bellcote, and a smaller chancel beyond	13th century	By the 17th century the fabric of the church had decayed and it was closed; in the 19th century it was being used as a cowshed. The church was repaired in 1883–84 by the rector and his wife, but later deteriorated again, and services were discontinued. It was repaired again in 1929 by the then patron of the benefice, and was used occasionally. In 2005 the church was declared redundant.	I
St Peter, Wolfhampcote	Warwickshire; 52.2834°N 1.2249°W	A stone church seen from the northwest with a squat tower in the foreground, with the north aisle to the left and the west end of the nave to the right	13th century	St Peter's stands in a field surrounded by a number of mounds resulting from the remains of a deserted village, disused canal workings, and a redundant railway line. It was largely rebuilt in the 14th century, the clerestory was added in the following century, and the tower was built in the later part of the 16th century. A mausoleum was added to the east end of the church in 1848.	II*
Talbot Chapel, Longford	Shropshire; 52.7630°N 2.4075°W		Late 13th century	The chapel is all that remains of a former church, most of which was demolished in 1802. It was originally the south chancel chapel of that church, and was preserved because it was owned by the Earls of Shrewsbury. It is now the mortuary chapel of the Talbot family.	II*
Moreton Jeffries Church, Moreton Jeffries	Herefordshire; 52.1333°N 2.5813°W		13th–14th century	A church without a dedication, this is a long low building with a simple plan consisting of a nave and chancel under a single roof, a south porch, and a bellcote. Internally there are box pews, and an elaborately carved Jacobean pulpit with a sounding board and a reading desk.	II*
All Saints, Beeby	Leicestershire; 52.6686°N 1.0194°W	The stone tower of a church with a battlemented parapet and a truncated spire	Early 14th century	All Saints is constructed in building materials of differing colours, including orange, white and red. The tower was added in the 15th century and is surmounted by a truncated spire. The chancel was rebuilt in 1819, and the south porch was added in the 19th century.	II*
St Mary (tower), Brentingby	Leicestershire; 52.7611°N 0.8387°W	A former church, now converted into a house seen from the east. At the far end is the preserved tower, with a saddleback roof	Early 14th century	After it was declared redundant in the 1950s, the fabric of the church deteriorated. In 1977 the body of the church was partly demolished and converted into a house, leaving the tower standing. The tower has four stages, and is surmounted by a saddleback roof on top of which is a spirelet.	II
St Michael, Churchill	Worcestershire; 52.1801°N 2.1143°W	A small simple church seen from the southeast, with a south porch and a bellcote with a pyramidal roof at the west	14th century	The church contains fragments of masonry from an earlier church building on the site. It was restored in 1863, and again in 1910. The chancel screen and the lectern were originally in Great Malvern Priory and were moved here at the time of the 1910 restoration.	II*
All Saints, Holdenby	Northamptonshire; 52.3021°N 0.9867°W		14th century	The lord of the manor built the present church to replace an earlier one on the site. It became isolated when Sir Christopher Hatton moved the dwellings of the nearby village to build his new mansion in the 1570s. The chancel was rebuilt in 1843–44, and the church was restored in 1867–68 by Sir George Gilbert Scott. The choir stalls were originally in Lincoln Cathedral.	II*
All Saints, Spetchley	Worcestershire; 52.1801°N 2.1143°W	A stone church with red tiled roofs seen from the south. Extending from the chancel on the right is a battlemented chapel and, to the left, the tower is also battlemented	14th century	All Saints stands adjacent to Spetchley Park. The south chapel was added in 1614 by Sir Rowland Berkeley, the owner of the hall, and the tower was probably built later that century. The chapel contains a series of monuments to the Berkeley family. The largest is to Sir Rowland and his wife, and consists of two effigies on a tomb chest under a coffered arch, flanked by obelisks.	II*
St John the Baptist, Strensham	Worcestershire; 52.0639°N 2.1316°W	A stone church seen from the south, with a tower and stair turret to the left, and the body of the church, with red tiled roofs, to the right	14th century	Built mainly in stone, the whole of the exterior of the church is rendered. The chancel contains monuments to the Russell family dating from the later part of the 14th century. The west gallery has been reconstructed from a 15th or 16th-century oak rood screen. It is elaborately carved and on its front are 23 painted panels.	I
St Michael, Stretton en le Field	Leicestershire; 52.7041°N 1.5516°W	In the foreground is the tower of a stone church with a recessed spire, and the body of the church extends beyond it	14th century	The tower was added in the 15th century and the clerestory during the following century. The spire was rebuilt in 1889, and the church was restored in 1911. It contains a full set of 18th-century box pews, and a carved alabaster grave slab dated 1489.	II*
St Mary Magdalene, Battlefield	Shropshire; 52.7507°N 2.7237°W	A grey stone church seen from the southeast, showing a chancel with a Perpendicular east window, an openwork parapet and pinnacles and, beyond that, the nave and a tower, also with pinnacles	1406–09	St Mary's is built on the site of the Battle of Shrewsbury in 1403. It was intended to act as a chantry chapel, but in 1410 it was re-founded as a college of priests. Following the Chantries Act, the college was closed in 1548, and St Mary's became a parish church. After the collapse of its roof, the nave was abandoned during the 18th century, and the chancel was restored in neoclassical style. Between 1860 and 1862 the church was restored and a mortuary chapel was added.	II*
St Leonard, Bridgnorth	Shropshire; 52.5371°N 2.4187°W	A sandstone church with the embattled tower on the left, and the body of the church on the right, seen end-on	15th century	The aisles of the church were badly damaged when stored ammunition was ignited by cannon fire during the Civil War in 1646. The roof of the nave was rebuilt in 1662, but the aisles were not restored until a series of restorations and reconstructions were carried out in the 19th century. A library was added to the north side of the chancel in 1878.	II*
St Swithun, Worcester	Worcestershire; 52.1926°N 2.2202°W	A Georgian church seen from the northeast, with a Venetian east window, and a Gothic tower with pinnacles at the west end	15th century	The tower dates from the 15th century, but between 1734 and 1736 the rest of the church was rebuilt and the tower was refaced. It is considered to be a good example of early Georgian church architecture, and contains 18th-century fittings, including the box pews, the font, and the three-decker pulpit. Since being declared redundant, it has been used for as a venue for special services, ceremonies and concerts.	I
St Lawrence, Evesham	Worcestershire; 52.0914°N 1.9476°W	A stone church seen from the north east, with a large Perpendicular east window, aisles with pinnacles, and a west tower with pinnacles and a spire	Late 15th century	St Lawrence's is one of two churches built in the town in the 12th century by the Benedictine monks of Evesham Abbey. Following the Reformation, this church followed a low church tradition and thus attracted a poorer congregation. The fabric of the church deteriorated, and by 1718 it had become unusable and was abandoned. Major rebuilding work took place in 1836–37 and the church re-opened, but during the 20th century the size of its congregation declined, and in 1978 it was declared redundant.	II*
Withcote Chapel, Withcote	Leicestershire; 52.6440°N 0.8254°W	A chapel in one cell with a battlemented parapet and crocketted pinnacles at the corners	Early 16th century	This was originally the private chapel for Withcote Hall, but later became a parish church. It was restored and refurbished in 1744, and almost all the internal fittings date from the 18th century. The seating is arranged along the sides in the style of a college chapel, and the reredos is in Renaissance style. The stained glass, dating from 1530 to 1540, is attributed to Galeon Hone, a glazier who worked for Henry VIII.	I
St Werburgh, Derby	Derbyshire; 52.9232°N 1.4812°W	A stone church seen from the west; on the left is the nave with a large Perpendicular window, and on the right is the tower with corner pinnacles	1601	The tower of a former church was rebuilt in 1601 followed by the chancel in 1699. The chancel and tower are under the care of the CCT. The rest of the church was rebuilt in 1893–94 by Sir Arthur Blomfield. It was declared redundant in 1990 and later converted for commercial use. It was reopened as a church building in 2017.	II*
St Peter, Adderley	Shropshire; 52.9522°N 2.5059°W	A plain stone church seen from the south, with a tower on the left, and scaffolding covering the transept in the middle and the chancel to the right	1635–37	St Peter's Church was divided in about 1970 to provide a dual function. Its nave and tower form an active parish church, while the chancel and the transepts are under the care of the Churches Conservation Trust. The oldest part of the church is the north transept, built in 1635–36 as a burial chapel for the Needham family. The cast iron window frames were made in the nearby Severn Gorge. The font is Norman and it carries a medieval inscription.	I
All Saints, Billesley	Warwickshire; 52.2094°N 1.7854°W	The west end of a Georgian church seen through trees, showing a porch over which is a window and a bellcote	1692	This Georgian church formerly served the village of Billesley and the occupants of the nearby Billesley Hall. Its south transept was originally a family pew, and it contains a fireplace. Also in the transept are two pieces of carved stone dating from the 12th century.	I
St Mary, Patshull	Staffordshire; 52.6034°N 2.2958°W	A Georgian church seen from the south. On the left is the tower with a cupola, the nave has a circular window, two round-headed windows and a porch supported by columns, and the chancel has a single round-headed window	1742	St Mary's was designed by James Gibbs for Sir John Astley, and replaced an earlier medieval church on the site. Additions made in 1874 include a north aisle, a bell tower, and a dome. It contains memorials to the Astley family.	II*
St Mary Magdalene, Croome D'Abitot	Worcestershire; 52.1035°N 2.1672°W	A stone church seen from the northwest, with a tower containing a porch in the foreground, and embattled body of the church stretching behind it	1758	In the 1750s George Coventry, 6th Earl of Coventry, commissioned Lancelot "Capability" Brown to design the exterior of the church, and Robert Adam to design its interior. The exterior is in Gothic Revival style, while the interior is Georgian. The chancel contains monuments to the Coventry family, which were moved from the previous church on a nearby site.	I
St Mary Magdalene, Stapleford	Leicestershire; 52.7553°N 0.7987°W	Almost obscured by trees is the tower of a stone church beyond a gate	1783	The church is situated in the grounds of Stapleford Park, and was designed by George Richardson for Robert Sherard, 4th Earl of Harborough. It replaced an earlier church on the site, and functioned as the Sherard family estate church as well as a parish church. It contains memorials moved from the earlier church, including one to the 4th Earl by John Michael Rysbrack.	I
Milton Mausoleum, Milton	Nottinghamshire; 53.2493°N 0.9297°W	A neoclassical church seen from an angle with the nave in the foreground and towards the back a lantern with a dome	1832	Designed by Sir Robert Smirke in Neoclassical style for the 4th Duke of Newcastle in memory of his wife and used as a family mausoleum, the nave also acted as a parish church until it closed in the 1950s.	I
St Mary the Virgin, Yazor	Herefordshire; 52.1143°N 2.8690°W	A stone church seen from the north. On the right is a narrow tower and spire, and projecting from the centre is the transept, all with lancet windows	1843–55	The church replaced an older church nearby, and was paid for by Uvedale Price and his son Robert Price. Its main architect was George Moore, but the rector Rev R. L. Freer designed the spire and fittings inside the church. It contains memorials to Sir Uvedale Price, Sir Robert Price, and Rev Freer.	II
St Saviour, Tetbury	Gloucestershire; 51.6380°N 2.1635°W	A church seen from the north with an extensive roof. On the right is the nave with a bellcote at the west end; on the left is the chancel with the vestry	1848	The church was built in 1848 as a chapel of ease for the poorer people who could not afford the pew rents at the parish church. It was designed by the local architect Samuel Daukes, assisted by A. W. N. Pugin and John Hardman. The church was declared redundant in 1974.	II*
St John the Baptist, Avon Dassett	Warwickshire; 52.1465°N 1.4019°W	A stone church with a tiled roof; on the left is a tower with a tall spire, and the body of the church extends to the right	1868	St John's stands on a steep hillside. It was built in 1868 on the site of an earlier church to a design by Charles Buckeridge. The architectural style of the church, other than the north arcade which is Norman, is Gothic Revival in the style of the early 14th century.	II*
St Botolph, Wardley	Rutland; 52.595°N 0.776°W	A stone church with a tiled roof; on the left is a tower with a tall spire, and the body of the church extends to the right	Medieval	St Botolph's is known for its south doorway, dating from c. 1175, and its early 13th century nave and 14th century tower.	II*
St Peter, Tickencote	Rutland; 52.6741°N 0.5366°W	A stone church with a tiled roof; on the left is a tower with a tall spire, and the body of the church extends to the right	Medieval	St Peter's is known for its massive Norman chancel arch and the sexpartite vaulting in the chancel. The building was rebuilt in 1792 at the expense of Miss Eliza Wingfield by the architect Samuel Pepys Cockerell.	I
St Nicholas, Saintbury	Gloucestershire; 52.0533°N 1.8306°W	A stone church with a tiled roof; on the right is a tower with a tall spire, and the body of the church extends to the left	Medieval	St Nicholas's was built in the 13th century but includes a Norman south door with tympanum and a circular Anglo-Saxon tide dial above the north door.	I
St Kenelm, Sapperton	Gloucestershire; 51.72935°N 2.07752°W	A stone church with a tiled roof; in the centre is a tower with a spire, and the body of the church extends on each side	Medieval	St Kenelm's was built in the 12th century. Inside the church is a collection of ornate memorials.	I

== See also ==
- List of churches preserved by the Churches Conservation Trust in the East of England
- List of churches preserved by the Churches Conservation Trust in Northern England
- List of churches preserved by the Churches Conservation Trust in Southeast England
- List of churches preserved by the Churches Conservation Trust in Southwest England

== Notes ==
^{A} The dates given for construction are often not exactly known. Where this is the case the century of first construction of the existing building is given.
