= St Bartholomew's Church, Furtho =

Coordinates: 52.0808°N 0.8728°W

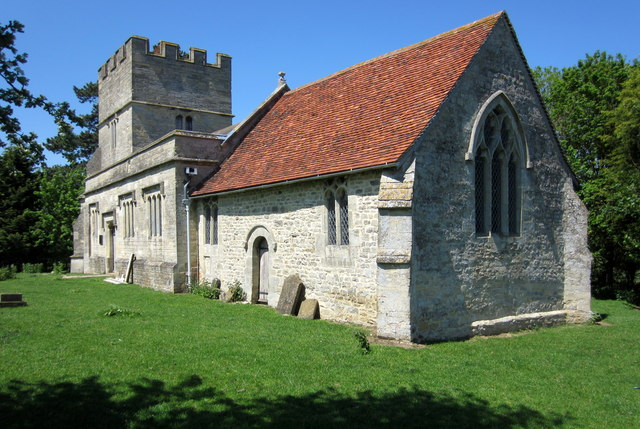
- St Bartholomew's Church, Furtho, from the southeast

- Location in Northamptonshire
- St Bartholomew's Church, Furtho
- OS grid reference: SP 773 430
- Location: Furtho, Northamptonshire
- Country: England
- Denomination: Anglican
- Website: Churches Conservation Trust

History
- Founded: before 1190
- Dedication: Saint Bartholomew
- Events: 1620, rebuilt and tower added 1870, restored

Architecture
- Functional status: Redundant
- Heritage designation: Grade II*
- Designated: 17 June 1960
- Architectural type: Church
- Style: Perpendicular
- Groundbreaking: 12th century
- Closed: 1920

Specifications
- Materials: Limestone, Slate and tile roofs

St Bartholomew's Church is a redundant Anglican church in the former village of Furtho, Northamptonshire, England. It is recorded in the National Heritage List for England as a designated Grade II* listed building, and is under the care of the Churches Conservation Trust. Once medieval village, Furtho became deserted following enclosures that began in the early 16th century and were completed by Thomas Furtho in the 1570s. All that remains in the vicinity of the church is a farm and a dovecote.

== History ==
The church dates from the 12th century, with additions and alterations in the 14th century. It was substantially rebuilt in about 1620 and was restored in 1870. It ceased to be a parish church in 1920. During the Second World War the church was used for storage of the archives of the Northampton Record Society, and during that time all the windows were destroyed by a bomb. The church was declared redundant on 16 May 1989, and was vested in the Churches Conservation Trust on 7 June 1990.

== Architecture ==
=== Exterior ===
St Bartholomew's is constructed in limestone. The roof of the nave is in slate, and the roofs of the chancel and tower are tiled. Its plan consists of a three-bay nave, a two-bay chancel and a west tower. The tower is built partly within the west end of the nave. It is in two stages, and has diagonal buttresses and a pyramidal roof. In the lower stage is a three-light west window, and the upper stage has three-light bell openings. The parapet is battlemented. The nave contains three-light, arched, mullioned windows. There are Tudor arched doorways in both the north and south walls. On the east gable is a finial. The east window has three lights. In the south wall of the chancel is a pair of two-light windows with Decorated tracery, and a round-arched priest's door.

=== Interior ===
In the chancel is a trefoil-headed piscina and a tomb recess. On each side of the east window is a bracket for an image. Also in the chancel is a marble memorial to Anthony Furtho, who died in 1558, and his two wives, and a monument to Edmund Arnold dated 1676. The octagonal font is small and dates from the 17th century.

== See also ==
- List of churches preserved by the Churches Conservation Trust in the English Midlands
