= St Nicholas of Myra's Church, Ozleworth =

Coordinates: 51.6380°N 2.2987°W

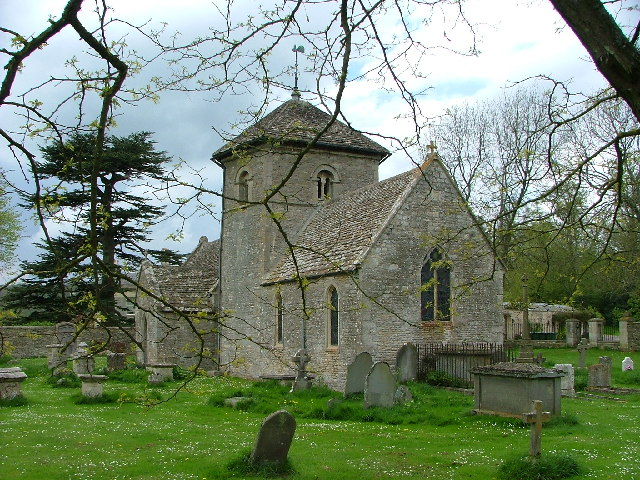
- St Nicholas of Myra's Church, Ozleworth, from the southeast

- Location in Gloucestershire
- OS grid reference: ST 794 932
- Location: Ozleworth, Gloucestershire
- Country: England
- Denomination: Anglican
- Website: visitchurches.org.uk/visit/church-listing/st-nicholas-ozleworth.html

History
- Dedication: Saint Nicholas of Myra

Architecture
- Functional status: Redundant
- Heritage designation: Grade II*
- Designated: 6 September 1964
- Architectural type: Church
- Style: Norman, Gothic
- Groundbreaking: 12th century
- Completed: 1873

Specifications
- Materials: Stone

St Nicholas of Myra's Church is a redundant Anglican church in the village of Ozleworth, Gloucestershire, England, in the care of The Churches Conservation Trust. It is recorded in the National Heritage List for England as a designated Grade II* listed building. The church is unusual because it is one of only two churches in Gloucestershire with a hexagonal tower, the other being St Lawrence's Church in Swindon. You can find the church by following signs for 'Historic Church' and for Newark Park nearby. By car, park outside the Ozleworth Estate, near to the gates, and follow a long bridle path downhill and around to the left until you reach the churchyard. Please note - the path can be muddy and slippery.

== History ==
The church stands in a circular churchyard, suggesting that there was an earlier church on the site, or even that the site could be pre-Christian. However, there is no mention of the church in the Domesday Book. The oldest part of the present church is the tower, which is Norman in style, and which may have acted as the original nave. It probably dates from the 12th century. During the following century a small nave was added to the west of the tower, and the chancel was added to its east side. At that time the nave measured 21 feet 6 inches (6.6 m) by 13 feet 8 inches (4.2 m). In 1732 a west gallery was erected; this was approached from the outside of the church by steps and a south doorway. In 1873 the church was restored by Rev W. H. Lowder. At this time the nave was lengthened by 11 feet (3.4 m). The church was declared redundant on 1 March 1981, and was vested in The Churches Conservation Trust on 27 October 1982.

== Architecture ==
The church is constructed in stone, with stone slate roofs. At its centre is a Norman tower, the plan of which is an irregular hexagon. To the east of the tower is a chancel, and to the west is a nave with a south porch. The nave now measures 33 feet (10.1 m) in length. The chancel is about 21 feet 6 inches (6.6 m) long; its width tapers from 12 feet 1 inch (3.7 m) at the western end to 11 feet 3 inches (3.4 m) at the east. The tower is divided into three stages by string courses. In the top stage, in each face, is a two-light window under a round-headed arch. On the summit is a pyramidal roof. In the north and south chancel walls are two single-light windows; between those on the north side is a priest's door with a trefoil head. At the east end is a two-light window above which is a gable with a cross at its apex. The windows in the nave are similar in style to those in the chancel, and between the two windows on the north side is a blocked doorway. The south porch is opposite to this and is gabled. Its inner doorway, dating from the 13th century, has two orders and is elaborately carved. Inside the church, the west tower arch is also elaborately carved. The font dates from the 13th century. In the east window are fragments of medieval stained glass, depicting a saint's head. In the southwest window of the tower are four panels of painted Flemish glass dating from the 16th or 17th century. The remainder of the stained glass is from the 19th century.

== External features ==
In the churchyard are three groups of monuments, each group comprising a Grade II listed building.

== See also ==
- List of churches preserved by the Churches Conservation Trust in the English Midlands
