= Billesley =

Billesley may refer to:

- Billesley, West Midlands, a district of Birmingham,
- Billesley, Warwickshire, a village near Stratford-upon-Avon.
