= St Mary's Church, Shipton Solars =

Coordinates: 51.8649°N 1.9560°W

St Mary's Church, Shipton Sollars
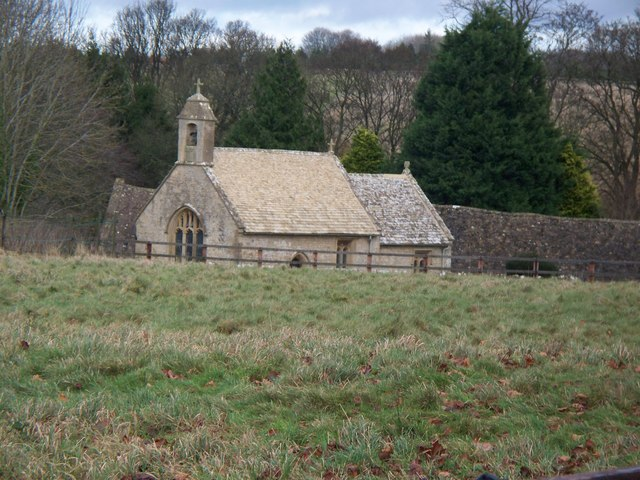
- St Mary's Church, Shipton Sollars

- Location in Gloucestershire
- OS grid reference: SP 031 184
- Location: Shipton Solars, Gloucestershire
- Country: England
- Denomination: Anglican

Architecture
- Functional status: Redundant
- Heritage designation: Grade I
- Designated: 26 January 1961
- Architect: W. E. Ellery Anderson (restoration)
- Architectural type: Church
- Style: Gothic
- Groundbreaking: 13th century

Specifications
- Materials: Limestone, roof of Cotswold stone slates

St Mary's Church is a redundant Anglican church in the village of Shipton Sollars, Gloucestershire, England under the care of The Churches Conservation Trust. It is recorded in the National Heritage List for England as a designated Grade I listed building,

== History ==
The first record of a church on the site is that of a chapel in 1236. By the 17th century the fabric of the building had decayed, and the church was closed. In 1883 Rev Charles Pugh was appointed rector. The church was at that time being used as a cow shed, its windows were blocked, and trees were growing through its roof. With the help of his wife, the rector repaired the church and reopened it the following year. Services were held during the summer months but the condition of the church deteriorated again, and the services were discontinued. In 1929 Ernest Francis Fieldhouse, the patron of the benefice, commissioned the architect W. E. Ellery Anderson to repair and restore the church again. This work included reconstructing the roof, unblocking the north doorway of the nave, and removing whitewash from the internal walls. The church continued in occasional use during the 20th century, but was declared redundant in 2005, and vested in the Churches Conservation Trust on 15 July of that year. The trust commissioned an architect to organise a programme of repairs, in particular to make the building wind and weatherproof. As of 2010, the church is unlocked during the day, and it is cleaned and cared for by local residents.

== Architecture ==
=== Exterior ===
St Mary's is constructed in limestone rubble, with Cotswold stone slates. Its style is Perpendicular. The exterior was originally plastered, and some of the plaster remains. Its plan is simple, consisting of a three-bay nave and a single-bay chancel, with a bellcote at the west end. In the north wall of the chancel there is a single lancet window with a cinquefoil head. The east window has three lights and is Perpendicular in style. In the south wall of the chancel is a priest's doorway, standing between a partly blocked two-light window and a small lancet window. In the south wall of the nave is a doorway with a two-light Perpendicular window to its right. The west window has three lights, and again is in Perpendicular style. In the north wall of the nave is a doorway and a single-light window with a cinquefoil head. The bellcote has one bell and is surmounted by a cross finial.

=== Interior ===
The interior of the church is plastered. Both the nave and the chancel have wagon roofs. To the left of the chancel arch is a small aumbry, and there is another aumbry in the north wall of the chancel. In the south wall of the chancel is a piscina The chancel walls are panelled, the panelling behind the altar having linenfold decoration. There are remnants of medieval paintings of texts and inscriptions in the nave, and painted crosses in the nave and chancel. Over the chancel arch is painted the date 1212. The floor is flagged. The choirstalls and chairs date from the 20th century. The carved oak pulpit and tester are from the 17th century. On the wall in front of the pulpit is an hourglass on a stand. The font dates from the 15th century, and consists of a plain octagonal bowl on an octagonal shaft. Around the walls of the church are monuments from the 17th and 18th centuries. The chancel windows contain 20th-century stained glass by Geoffrey Webb. The east window contains depictions of Saint Thomas and Mary Magdalene, the north window has the arms of the Fieldhouse family, and the southeast window includes a depiction of the Madonna and Child.

== See also ==
- List of churches preserved by the Churches Conservation Trust in the English Midlands
