= St Peter's Church, Wolfhampcote =

Coordinates: 52.2834°N 1.2249°W

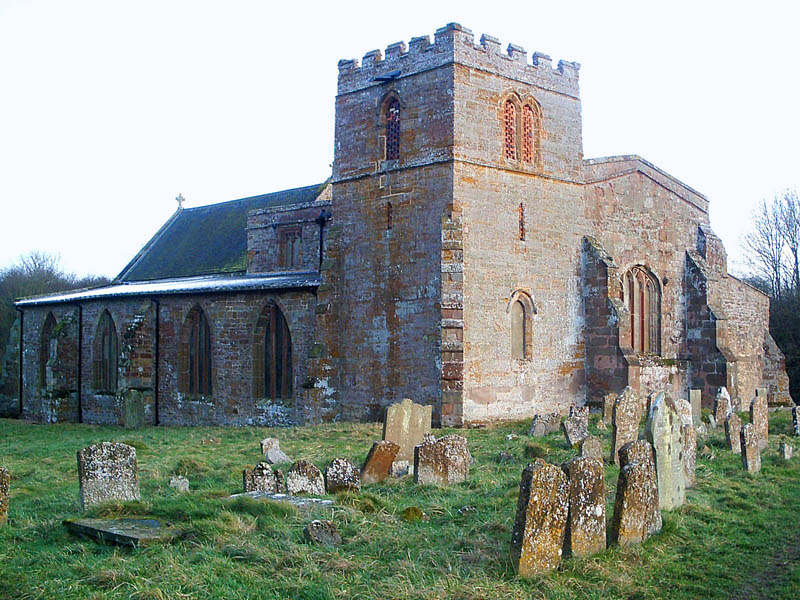
- St Peter's Church, Wolfhampcote, from the northwest

- Location in Warwickshire
- Location: Wolfhampcote, Warwickshire
- Country: England
- Denomination: Anglican
- Website: Churches Conservation Trust

History
- Dedication: Saint Peter

Architecture
- Functional status: Redundant
- Architectural type: Church
- Style: Gothic
- Groundbreaking: 13th century
- Completed: 1848
- Closed: 1940s

Specifications
- Materials: Limestone and sandstone

Listed Building – Grade II*
- Official name: Church of St Peter and attached Mausoleum
- Designated: 6 October 1960
- Reference no.: 1034927

St Peter's Church is a redundant Anglican church standing in an isolated position in the civil parish of Wolfhampcote, Warwickshire, England (grid reference SP529653). Since 1960 the church and its attached mausoleum have been recorded in the National Heritage List for England as a designated Grade II* listed building, and are now under the care of the Churches Conservation Trust. The church stands in a field which contains a number of mounds. These are partly the remains of the medieval village initially served by the church, which has been deserted village for centuries, partly from disused canal workings, and partly from the remains of a redundant railway line.

== History ==
The presence of a church in Wolfhampcote was recorded in the Domesday Book of 1086. The earliest fabric in the present church dates from the 13th century and is in the north aisle and the north chapel. During the following century the church was largely rebuilt, and in the 15th century the roof was altered and the clerestory was added. After the Dissolution of the Monasteries, the tower was built in the later part of the 16th century. In 1690 the top of the tower was altered and it was re-roofed; this was confirmed by finding the date and the initials of the churchwardens on the outside of the crenellations at the top of the west side of the tower.

The church then remained virtually unchanged until 1848, when a restoration was carried out, and the mausoleum was added to the east end of the church. After that time the population of the parish declined. More repairs and some restorations were carried out in 1903, at a cost of £425 (equivalent to £45,000 as of 2025). The church closed in 1910, but reopened two years later at the request of the local residents. However it was only used occasionally for services, and closed again soon after the end of the Second World War. It was damaged by vandalism and in the late 1950s the diocese decided to demolish it, leaving just the walls standing. However the charity, the Friends of Friendless Churches, was granted permission to carry out repairs. But more vandalism took place, and the entrances and the lower windows were blocked to prevent entry to the building. Following the Pastoral Measure of 1968 the church was declared redundant, and on 3 March 1972 it was vested in the Redundant Churches Fund (now known as the Churches Conservation Trust). More work has since been carried out to make the building weatherproof and secure from vandalism.

== Architecture ==
=== Exterior ===
The chancel is constructed in limestone, while the rest of the church is in sandstone. Its plan consists of a three-bay nave with a clerestory, north and south aisles, a two-bay chancel with a chapel to the north, a south porch, and a northwest tower. The tower is in two stages divided by a string course. In the lower stage is a west lancet window and blocked lancet slits on the west and north sides. In the upper stage are paired bell openings. The parapet is battlemented. The chancel has a five-light Perpendicular east window, and two and three-light windows with Decorated tracery elsewhere. It has a south doorway, and on its gable is a cross finial. There are windows on the south and east sides of the south aisle, and in the sides of the porch are blocked lancet windows. The clerestory is in two bays, and has two-light Decorated windows on each side. On the north of the church the aisle and the chapel are joined as one unit, forming four bays. These contain three-light north windows, a three-light east window, and a four-light west Perpendicular window.

=== Interior ===
The interior of the church is plastered. Between the chancel and the chapel is a two-bay arcade supported by an octagonal pier, and between the nave and the north aisle is a similar arcade. The south arcade has three bays. In the south aisle is a simple piscina, and there is a piscina with an ogee arch in the north chapel. The font is a plain tub, dating possibly from the 13th century. The oak chapel screen dates from the 14th century and contains Decorated tracery. The altar rails, from the late 17th century, are carried on barley sugar twist balusters. The pulpit is hexagonal and is dated 1790. Some of the benches date from the 14th century. Above the chancel arch are the painted Royal arms of 1702. There are some painted panels in the north chapel. The wall monuments date from the late 18th and early 19th centuries. The tower contains two bells. The larger of these was cast by John Sturdy of London, probably in the middle of the 15th century. The other is dated 1780 and was cast by Pack and Chapman at the Whitechapel Bell Foundry. Both bells were repaired in the 1970s by John Taylor and Co of Loughborough and were rung for the first time for over 30 years on St Peter's Day, 1976.

== External features ==
In the churchyard are six items that are designated as Grade II listed buildings. One of these is a group of 50 memorials south of the chancel and the south aisle of the church, which date from the 17th, 18th and 19th centuries. A row of three headstones carries dates from the 17th century. Another headstone is dated 1709. A further monument is a chest tomb dated 1687. Elsewhere is a pair of headstones dated 1695 and 1697. The final item is another pair of headstones, dating from the late 17th or early 18th century.

== See also ==
- List of churches preserved by the Churches Conservation Trust in the English Midlands
