= St Gregory's Church, Fledborough =

Coordinates: 53.2406°N 0.7847°W

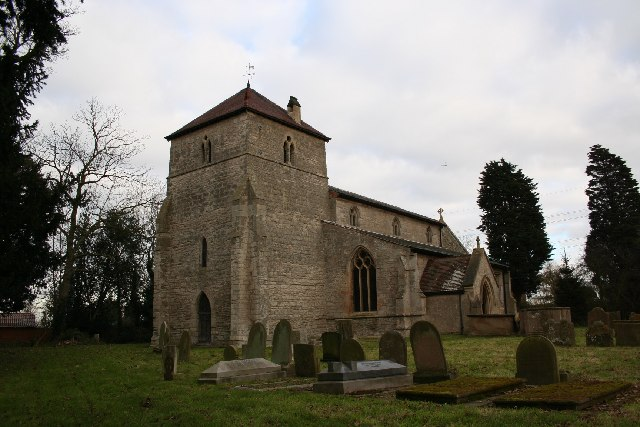
- St Gregory's Church, Fledborough, from the southwest

- Location in Nottinghamshire
- OS grid reference: SK 812 721
- Location: Fledborough, Nottinghamshire
- Country: England
- Denomination: Anglican
- Website: Churches Conservation Trust

History
- Dedication: Saint Gregory

Architecture
- Functional status: Redundant
- Heritage designation: Grade I
- Designated: 1 February 1967
- Architectural type: Church
- Style: Norman, Gothic
- Groundbreaking: 12th century
- Completed: 1912

Specifications
- Materials: Stone with some brick Slate and tile roofs

St Gregory's Church is a redundant Anglican church in Fledborough, Nottinghamshire, England. It is recorded in the National Heritage List for England as a designated Grade I listed building, and is under the care of the Churches Conservation Trust. The church stands at the end of a lane, in meadows near the River Trent.

== History ==
The oldest fabric in the church is the lower part of the tower, which was built in the 12th century. Much of the rest of the church dates from the first half of the 14th century. By 1764 the chancel was in "a ruinous condition", and it was rebuilt and shortened. It was rebuilt again in 1890, and the aisles and south porch were rebuilt in 1912.

During the 18th century the church gained a degree of notoriety because its rector, Rev W. Sweetapple, granted licences for marriage to runaway couples. Because of this it came to be regarded as "the Gretna Green of the Midlands". In 1820, Thomas Arnold, later headmaster of Rugby School, married Mary Penrose, the daughter of the rector, in the church. The church was vested in the Churches Conservation Trust on 1 January 1991.

== Architecture ==
=== Exterior ===
The church is constructed in stone with some brick in the clerestories. The tower and porch are roofed in tiles, while the rest of the church has slate roofs. Its plan consists of a four-bay nave with a low clerestory, north and south aisles, a south porch, a chancel, and a west tower. The tower is in two stages separated by a string course. It has angle buttresses and a pyramidal roof. On the south side of its roof is a bellcote. In the lower stage is a west door, above which is a 12th-century lancet window. In the upper stage are two-light bell openings on all sides. The north aisle has a doorway with a pointed arch between three-light windows, one to the west and three to the east; there is a similar window on its east wall. In the north and south walls of the clerestory are three two-light windows. The chancel has a three-light window in the north wall, and two three-light windows in the south wall. The east window also has three lights, the central one of which is partly blocked with masonry. On the ridge of the east gable of the chancel is a cross. The south aisle also contains three three-light windows, and on its east wall are a blocked pointed arcade arch and a blocked doorway. In its west wall is another three-light window. The south porch has diagonal buttresses, a coped gable with a ridge cross, and an arched entrance. Its east wall contains a sundial. Built into the exterior of the wall of the south aisle is the carved effigy of a woman, holding what is thought to be a heart. It dates from the 14th century and originally lay recumbent on a tomb.

=== Interior ===
The nave is divided from the aisles by four-bay arcades. In the north wall of the chancel is a piscina, over which are remaining parts of an Easter Sepulchre. These consist of panels carved with depictions of sleeping soldiers, angels, and Christ rising from the dead. There is another piscina in the south aisle wall. Beside the south doorway are the remains of a stoup. Also on the south wall is a simple alms box bearing the inscription "Remember the Poor 1684". The middle light of the east window, partly blocked by masonry, contains a canopied niche. The windows on each side contain 14th-century stained glass. The right window has a depiction of the Virgin and Child, under which is a knight. In the left window are depictions of John the Baptist and Saint Andrew. There are more fragments of stained glass from this period in other windows. Most of the church furniture, including the pulpit and the octagonal font, dates from the 19th century. In the north aisle are tombs dating from the 14th century. Inside the tower is the broken alabaster effigy of a knight.

== External features ==
A group of five headstones dated between 1735 and 1737 in the churchyard is listed Grade II.

== See also ==
- List of churches preserved by the Churches Conservation Trust in the English Midlands
- Grade I listed buildings in Nottinghamshire
- Listed buildings in Fledborough
