= Listed buildings in Fledborough =

Fledborough is a civil parish in the Bassetlaw District of Nottinghamshire, England. The parish contains three listed buildings that are recorded in the National Heritage List for England. Of these, one is listed at Grade I, the highest of the three grades, and the others are at Grade II, the lowest grade. The parish contains the hamlet of Fledborough and the surrounding countryside, and the listed buildings consist of a church, a group of headstones in the churchyard, and a house.

== Key ==
Grade	Criteria
I	Buildings of exceptional interest, sometimes considered to be internationally important
II	Buildings of national importance and special interest

== Buildings ==
Name and location	Photograph	Date	Notes	Grade
St Gregory's Church; 53.24064°N 0.78472°W		12th century	The church has been altered and extended through the centuries, the chancel was shortened in the 18th century, it was rebuilt in 1890, and the aisles and south porch were rebuilt in 1912. The church is built in stone with some brick, and roofs of slate and tile, and it consists of a nave with a clerestory, north and south aisles, a south porch, a chancel and a west tower. The tower has two stages, angle buttresses, a string course, and a west doorway with a pointed arch and a chamfered surround, above which is a lancet window, bell openings with two lights, and a pyramidal roof.	I
Group of five headstones 53.24051°N 0.78462°W		1735	The headstones are in the churchyard of St Gregory's Church to the south of the church. They are in stone and are dated 1735, 1736 and 1737. The headstones carry inscriptions and are carved with various motifs.	II
Manor House; 53.23921°N 0.78535°W	—	Early 19th century	The house is in rendered red brick, and has a hipped tile roof with overhanging eaves. There are two storeys and six bays, the right end bay slightly recessed. On the front is a Doric porch, and the windows are sashes.	II
