= List of UK civil parish enclaves and exclaves =

This article provides a list of civil parish enclaves and exclaves in the United Kingdom.

== Background ==
Legislation in the United Kingdom removed almost all civil parish enclaves and exclaves.

== List ==
=== Parish exclaves ===
Barnby Moor consists of two unconnected parts

"Parish exclaves" refers to parts of a parish geographically separated from the main body of the parish, surrounded by other parishes.

Parish	Exclave location	Area (hectares)	Ref.
Barnby Moor	Bilby	278.97	
Bisley	Small, farm-associated exclaves	17.43	
Denwick	South of Alnwick, separated from main body by Alnwick civil parish.	1,848.22	
Fylingdales	Helwath Plantation/Castlebeck Farm	31.40	
Millbrook	Sango Island, surrounded by Maker-with-Rame	0.04	
Milton	Chesterton Fen	78.37	
Old Hunstanton	Undistinguished/tidal island	51.37	
Pendock	Sledge Green	180.74	
Scotforth	Burrow Heights	77.02	
Thorpe St Andrew	Thorpe Island (River Yare). Being entirely surrounded by Norwich, this is also an exclave of Broadland, the only example in the United Kingdom of an exclave at district level	9.25	
Wallingwells	Undistinguished	9.60	
Warbstow	Canworthy Water	188.53	
West Bradley	Hornblotton Green	447.53	
Weston Subedge	Separated from main body by Aston-Sub-Edge	445.79	

=== Parish enclaves ===
St Cuthbert Out surrounds the parish of Wells

Parish enclaves are areas that are completely surrounded by another parish.

Enclave parish	Surrounding parish	Ref.
Shap	Shap Rural	
Stone	Stone Rural	
Wells	St Cuthbert Out	
Wem	Wem Rural	
