= Old St Bartholomew's Church, Lower Sapey =

Coordinates: 52.2392°N 2.4418°W

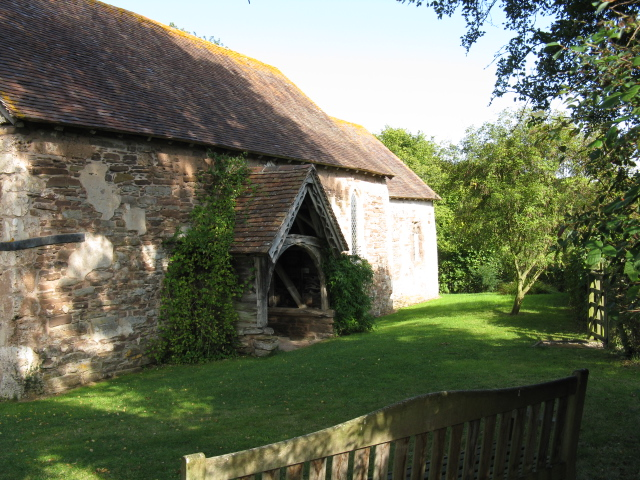
- Old St Bartholomew's Church, Lower Sapey, from the southwest

- Location in Worcestershire
- OS grid reference: SO 699 602
- Location: Near Lower Sapey, Worcestershire
- Country: England
- Denomination: Anglican
- Website: Churches Conservation Trust

History
- Dedication: Saint Bartholomew

Architecture
- Functional status: Redundant
- Heritage designation: Grade II*
- Designated: 29 July 1959
- Architectural type: Church
- Style: Norman
- Groundbreaking: Early 12th century

Specifications
- Materials: Sandstone, tile roofs

Old St Bartholomew's Church is a redundant Anglican church near the village of Lower Sapey, Worcestershire, England. It is recorded in the National Heritage List for England as a designated Grade II* listed building, and is under the care of the Churches Conservation Trust. The church is also a Scheduled Ancient Monument. It stands on a steep bank above a stream at the end of a winding lane.

== History ==
The church dates from the early part of the 12th century. It is likely that an earlier church existed on the site because the Domesday Book records the presence of a priest, but no trace of that church has survived. In the 14th century the south porch was built and a window was added to the south wall of the chancel. During the 19th century further alterations were made, including widening of windows, re-seating the church, and installing a west gallery. It is likely that the chancel arch was removed at this time. The functions of the church were replaced in 1877 by St Bartholomew's Church, Harpley. It was then neglected and was used for a time as a farm building. Since 1990 repairs and restoration have been carried out. This has been assisted by the formation of a local trust known as The Friends of Old St. Bartholomew's. The work included reinstating the west gallery. The intention of the restorers was "to make it appear as though we had never been on the site". The church was vested in the Churches Conservation Trust on 21 January 1994.

== Architecture ==
=== Exterior ===
St Bartholmew's is constructed in sandstone rubble with tile roofs. The exterior of the church is partly rendered. Its plan is simple and consists of a nave, chancel and south porch. The nave measures 34 feet 4 inches (10.5 m) by 19 feet (5.8 m), and the chancel 19 feet 8 inches (6.0 m) by 15 feet (4.6 m). The east window consists of a single light under a pointed arch. On the south wall of the chancel is a window of two trefoiled lights under a square head, to the west of which is a blocked priest's door. On the north wall of the chancel is a narrow round-headed window. The south porch is built in timber on a rubble plinth. It has a gabled roof over curved wind braces. Its walls are weatherboarded, and its bargeboard is decorated with moulding. The doorway is Norman and consists of a single order with a tympanum. In the west wall is a large square-headed 19th-century window over which is a small 12th-century opening. The north wall contains a blocked doorway and a 19th-century window.

=== Interior ===
The interior of the church is plastered. In the north wall of the chancel are two square aumbries, and in the south wall is a piscina and another square aumbry. Over the east window is a blocked 12th-century window. At the west end of the church is a gallery. Also in the church are the remnants of a circular font base. The Norman bowl of the font has been removed to the new church. On the north wall of the nave are traces of medieval paintings.

== See also ==
- List of churches preserved by the Churches Conservation Trust in the English Midlands
