= St Oswald's Church, Lassington =

Coordinates: 51.888713°N 2.2977887°W

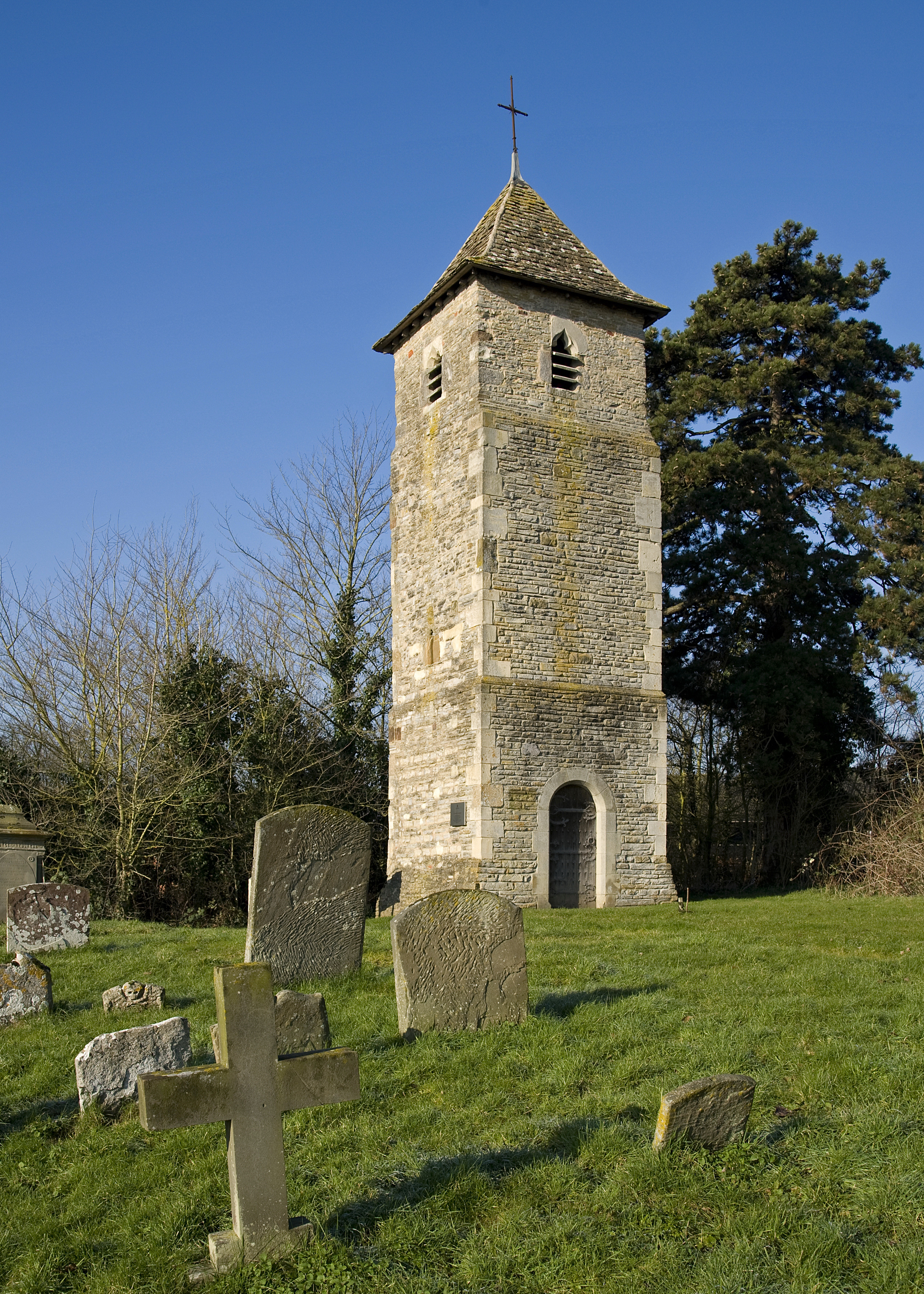
- South face of the tower of St Oswald's Church, Lassington

- Location in Gloucestershire
- OS grid reference: SO 796 211
- Location: Lassington, Highnam, Gloucestershire
- Country: England
- Denomination: Church of England

History
- Dedication: Saint Oswald
- Dedicated: 1095

Architecture
- Functional status: Redundant
- Heritage designation: Grade II*
- Designated: 10 January 1955
- Style: Norman
- Groundbreaking: Late 11th century
- Completed: 14th century
- Closed: 1972
- Demolished: 1975 (body of church)

Specifications
- Materials: Lias rubble, stone slate roof

St Oswald's Church was an Anglican church in the village of Lassington and the civil parish of Highnam, Gloucestershire, England. Only the tower survived to the present day, and it is under the care of the Churches Conservation Trust. The tower is recorded in the National Heritage List for England as a designated Grade II* listed building.

== History ==
Construction of the tower began in the late 11th century. The church was initially a chapel of St Oswald's Priory in Gloucester. The nave and south porch of the church were in Norman style, and the chancel was Early English. A third stage was added to the tower in the 14th century. In 1678 a south chapel was demolished, and the following year the south wall of the chancel was rebuilt and two new windows were added. A major restoration was carried out in 1875 by Medland and Son. This consisted of demolishing all the church except for the tower, rebuilding it on its original footings, and adding an organ chamber and vestry on the north side of the chancel. The fabric of the building deteriorated during the 20th century, and by 1970 there were holes in the roof. It was declared redundant in 1972, and the body of the church was demolished in 1975, leaving only the tower. The tower was restored the following year. It had been vested in the Churches Conservation Trust on 6 September 1974.

== Architecture ==
The tower is constructed in lias rubble with a stone slate roof. It is in three stages, and it has a pyramidal roof with an iron cross on its apex. In the bottom stage is a round-headed doorway on the east side and a narrow round-headed lancet window on the west. The middle stage has a lancet window on the south face. In the top stage are wider trefoil-headed bell openings containing stone louvres.

== See also ==
- List of churches preserved by the Churches Conservation Trust in the English Midlands
