= St Mary's Church, Brentingby =

Coordinates: 52.7611°N 0.8387°W

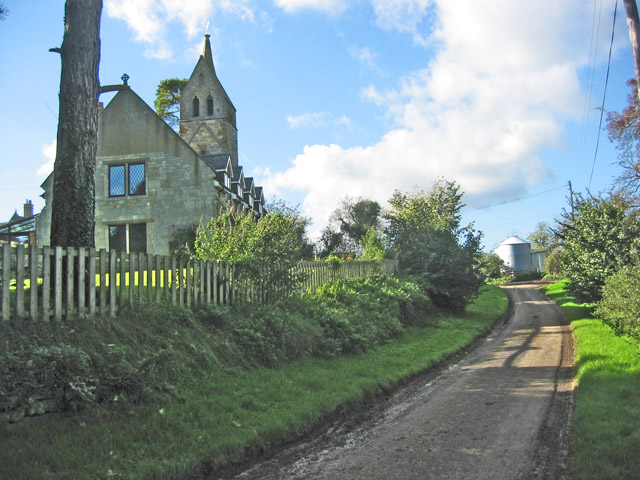
- The former St Mary's Church, Brentingby, now a house, with the tower at the far end

- Location in Leicestershire
- OS grid reference: SK 784 187
- Location: Brentingby, Leicestershire
- Country: England
- Denomination: Anglican
- Website: Churches Conservation Trust

Architecture
- Functional status: Redundant
- Heritage designation: Grade II
- Designated: 1 January 1968
- Architectural type: Church
- Style: Gothic
- Groundbreaking: 14th century
- Completed: 1660

Specifications
- Materials: Limestone

St Mary's Church is a redundant Anglican church in the village of Brentingby, Leicestershire, England. The walls of the church required renovation when converted into a private house, with the tower standing untouched. The tower is recorded in the National Heritage List for England as a designated Grade II listed building, and is under the care of the Churches Conservation Trust.

== History ==
The church was built in the 14th century, and remodelled in 1660. The remodelling consisted of shortening the east end and building a new east wall, replacing the nave windows, rebuilding the roof to give it a steeper pitch, and blocking the north door. The church was declared redundant in the 1950s. Thereafter its condition deteriorated. In 1972–73 a trial excavation was undertaken. In 1977 the body of the church was renovated as part of the conversion into a house, with the tower remaining untouched. The land is the ecclesiastical parish of Melton Mowbray, whose parochial church council administers the town church and four others for formerly very rural, less than 2-mile away, lesser active, ex-independent parish churches.

== Architecture ==
=== Present state ===
The tower is constructed in limestone. It is divided into four stages by string courses. In the lowest stage are ogee-headed lancet windows in the north, south and west sides, and there are similar windows in the second stage on the north and south. All these windows are blocked. In the third stage there is an altered louvred opening on the east side, and the remains of a lancet window on the west. In the top stage are ogee-headed lancet bell openings on the north and the south sides. The tower is surmounted by a saddleback roof, on which is an octagonal spirelet. In each of the east and west gables of the roof are two lancet openings, above each of which is an ogee-headed niche with a bracket containing a ballflower ornament.

=== Previous church ===
The church previously consisted of a nave without aisles. The east window was a square-headed mullioned window with four lights, while the four windows in the north and south walls of the nave were similar, but with three lights. Above one of the windows was an inscription recording the 1660 repairs. At the time of the excavation, a number of re-used decorative stones were found within the structure of the nave walls. Also present was a series of wall paintings. On the east wall were Royal arms dating probably from the time of George I. There were the remains of texts, including the Ten Commandments on the north wall. Partly covered by plaster was a painting depicting a pair of figures. One of these was a skeleton holding a spear and a spade. The other was a man, possibly holding a musical instrument. This painting constitutes a memento mori, and has been removed for display in a museum. There had been two bells, one dating from the 14th century, and the other probably from the 16th century.

== See also ==
- List of churches preserved by the Churches Conservation Trust in the English Midlands
