= All Saints Church, Billesley =

Coordinates: 52.2094°N 1.7854°W

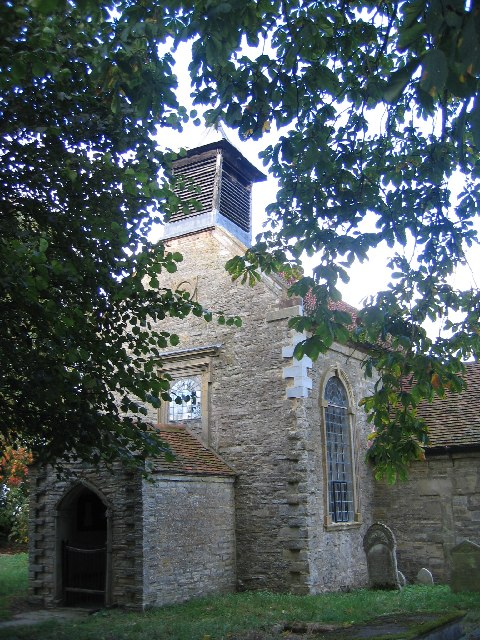
- All Saints Church, Billesley, from the southwest
- All Saints Church, Billesley
- OS grid reference: NZ 274 513
- Location: Billesley, Warwickshire
- Country: England
- Denomination: Anglican
- Website: Churches Conservation Trust

Architecture
- Functional status: Redundant
- Architect: Bernard Whalley
- Architectural type: Church
- Style: Georgian
- Groundbreaking: 12th century
- Completed: 18th century

Specifications
- Length: 30 feet 6 inches (9.3 m)
- Width: 13 feet 6 inches (4.1 m)
- Materials: Blue lias stone, tiled roof

Listed Building – Grade I
- Official name: Church of All Saints
- Designated: 5 April 1967
- Reference no.: 1382704

All Saints Church is a redundant Anglican church in the village of Billesley, Warwickshire, England. It is recorded in the National Heritage List for England as a designated Grade I listed building, and is under the care of the Churches Conservation Trust.

== History ==
There is evidence that an earlier church was on the site dating from the 12th century, but the present church was built in 1692 by Bernard Whalley. Alterations were made to it in the 18th century. The church served the village of Billesley until its population declined in the 15th century, and also served the occupants of the nearby Billesley Hall.

== Architecture ==
=== Exterior ===
The church is constructed in blue lias stone, and it has a tiled roof. Its architectural style is Georgian. The plan consists of a two-bay nave with an apse at the east end, a west porch and a south transept, which was initially a family pew and was later used as a vestry. At the west end is a bellcote. The apse contains a round-headed window, and there are two similar windows on both the north and south sides. Between the windows on the north is a blocked doorway, and on the south side the windows flank the transept. The transept has a gable decorated with urns and a finial, and it contains an oculus. At the west end the porch is also gabled, and this carries an urn finial and a ball finial. Above the porch is a smaller round-headed window. The bellcote is louvred and has a cornice, an ogival cupola, and a weathervane.

=== Interior ===
The interior of the church contains some re-used 12th-century masonry. In the transept is a fireplace with a bolection-moulded surround. There is a gallery at the west end. On the north side of the church are stalls, on the south side is a priest's desk and pews, and at the west end are box pews. The octagonal font is simple in design. In the transept are two pieces of carved stone. One is a tympanum dating from about 1140 that depicts a man being attacked by a snake and a dragon, and being defended by a dove. The other stone is carved on three sides. It dates from about 1150 and it contains a figure of Christ holding a cross shaft. It is probably part of a Harrowing of Hell. The single bell was cast in 1721 by Richard Sanders. When the church was active in 1945, its communion plate included a cup and cover dated 1634, and an alms plate inscribed 1700. Investigators looking through the church floor have found a crypt and have seen inside two sarcophagi and a chest; the crypt has not been opened in recent history but plans are underway to open it in 2011 as part of an inspection of the state of the church floor.

== Tradition ==
There is a tradition that William Shakespeare married Anne Hathaway in the earlier church on the site, and also that Shakespeare's granddaughter Elizabeth Barnard was married there. However, as the parish registers have not survived, this cannot be confirmed.

== See also ==
- List of churches preserved by the Churches Conservation Trust in the English Midlands
