= St John the Baptist's Church, Avon Dassett =

Coordinates: 52.1465°N 1.4019°W

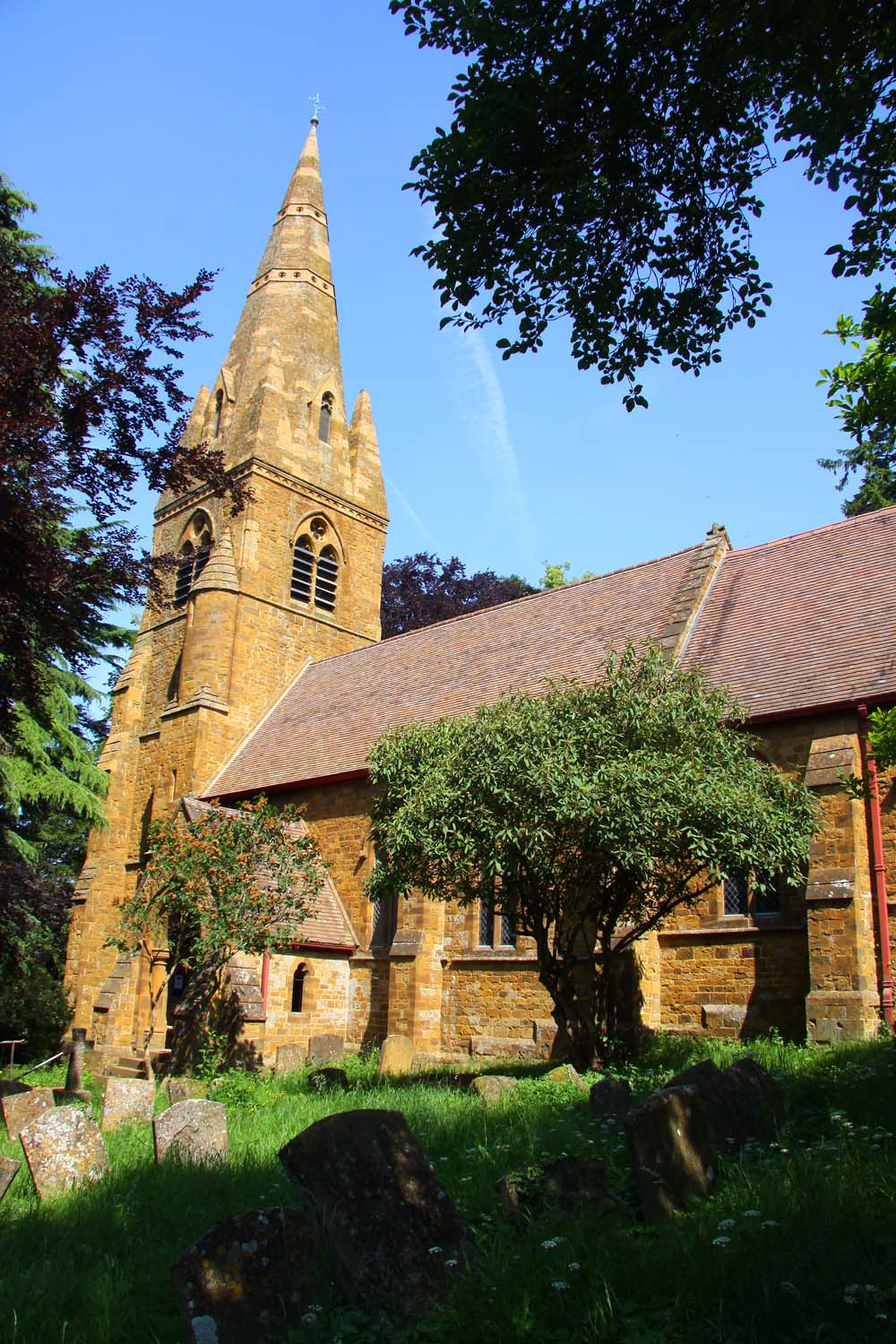
- St John the Baptist's Church, Avon Dassett, from the southeast

- Location in Warwickshire
- OS grid reference: SP 411 500
- Location: Avon Dassett, Warwickshire
- Country: England
- Denomination: Anglican
- Website: Churches Conservation Trust

History
- Dedication: John the Baptist

Architecture
- Functional status: Redundant
- Architect: Charles Buckeridge
- Architectural type: Church
- Style: Gothic Revival
- Completed: 1868
- Closed: 11 May 1983

Specifications
- Materials: Sandstone, tiled roofs

Listed Building – Grade II*
- Official name: Church of St. John the Baptist
- Designated: 30 May 1967
- Reference no.: 1024250

St John the Baptist's Church is a redundant Anglican church in the village of Avon Dassett, Warwickshire, England. It is recorded in the National Heritage List for England as a designated Grade II* listed building, and is under the care of The Churches Conservation Trust.

== History ==
The present church was built in 1868 on the site of an earlier church dating from the Norman era. The architect was Charles Buckeridge. The church was declared redundant on 11 May 1983, and was vested in the Churches Conservation Trust. It is still used occasionally for concerts or community events. Between May 2007 and September 2008 work was carried out on the spire at a cost of about £700,000, with the result that the church bells were rung on 21 February 2009, the first time for some decades.

== Architecture ==
=== Exterior ===
The church is constructed in Hornton sandstone with tiled roofs. Its plan consists of a three-bay nave with a north aisle and a south porch, a three-bay chancel with a north organ chamber, and a west tower with a spire. The architectural style of the church, other than the north arcade, is Gothic Revival, in the style of the early 14th century. Most of the fabric used was new, although a small amount of fabric from the earlier church was incorporated, including fragments from the 12th century. The tower is in three stages, with angle buttresses, and a stair turret at the southeast angle. The lowest stage has a west window of four lights, which was formerly the east window of the earlier church. In the middle stage is single-light window, and in the upper stage the bell openings have two lights. The tower is surmounted by a tall octagonal spire. The nave measures 44 feet (13.4 m) by 17 feet (5.2 m). In its south wall is a porch and three windows, one with a single light, and the others with two lights. The north aisle is 10 feet (3.0 m) wide, and has three two-light windows. The chancel measures about 34 feet (10.4 m) by 16 feet (4.9 m). Its east window has three lights. The other windows have two lights, two on the north side and three on the south.

=== Interior ===
The three-bay north arcade is in Norman style, carried on round pillars. In the north wall of the chancel is a recess containing a 13th-century stone coffin with a lid. The lid is carved in high relief with the effigy of a deacon with a tonsure. He is dressed in vestments, including a cassock, an alb, a dalmatic, a maniple, and a stole. It is thought that this is the coffin of Hugh (or Hugo), rector of the church, who died in about 1240. All the furniture of the church dates from the building of the present church, including the font, which is made of grey marble. In the sanctuary are an oak altar and choir stalls, a stone triple sedilia, and a reredos in grey Purbeck marble with a cross in its centre. In the church are memorials dating from the 18th and 19th centuries. The west window contains a few fragments of 15th-century glass. There is a ring of five bells that were cast by William Blews of Birmingham. Since the church was declared redundant, work has been carried out to improve their condition. The parish registers date from 1559.

== External features ==
In the churchyard are six headstones and a chest tomb, each of which is designated as a Grade II listed building. The headstones consist of one dated 1687, another from the mid-late 17th century, a further one dated 1699, another dated 1681, one dated 1706, and another, this one dated 1719. The chest tomb dates from the middle of the 17th century.

== See also ==
- List of churches preserved by the Churches Conservation Trust in the English Midlands
