= Scotforth (parish) =

Coordinates: 54.023°N 2.770°W

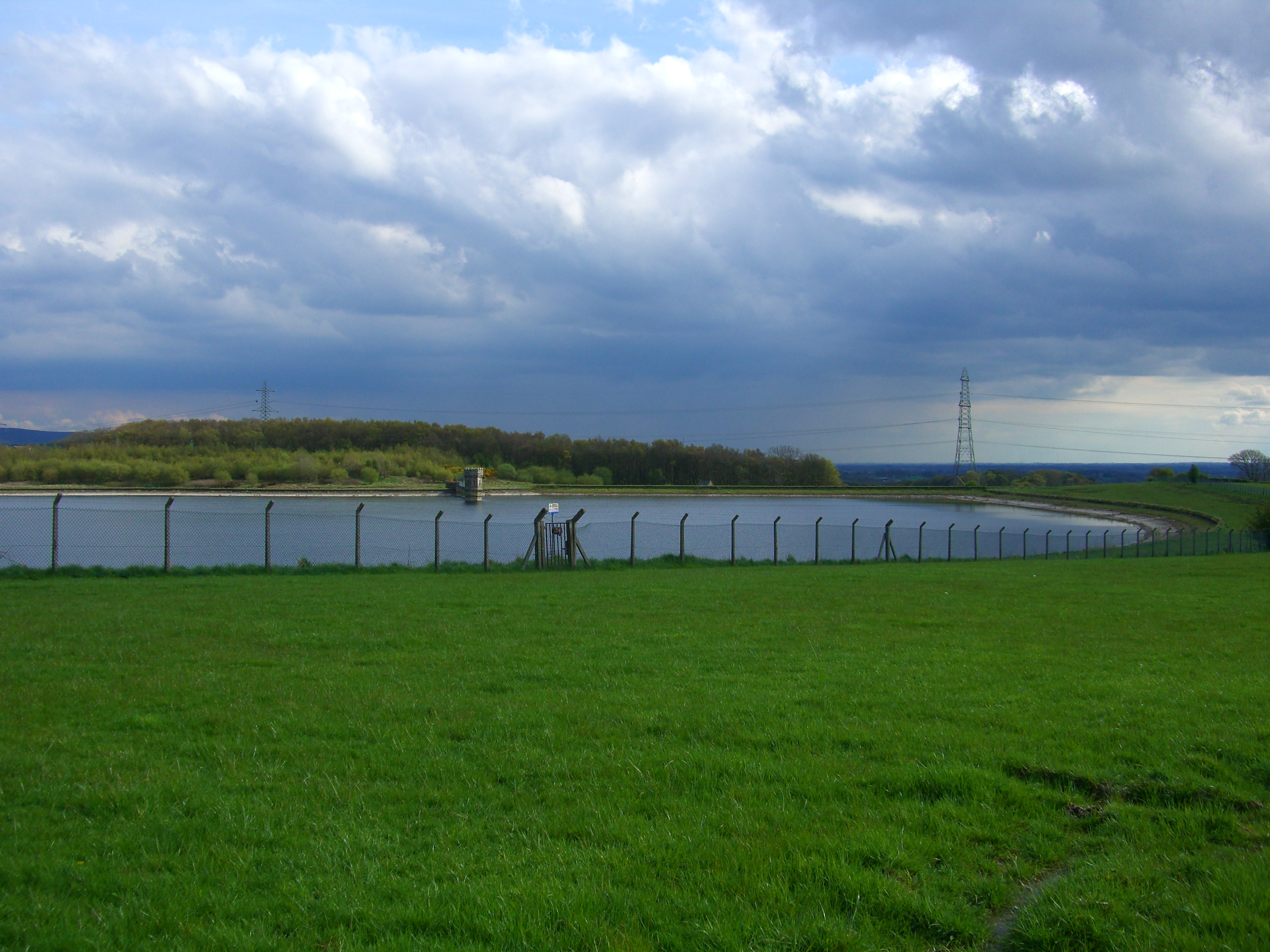
- Blea Tarn Reservoir

- Location in the City of Lancaster district Location within Lancashire
- Population: 320 (2021 census)
- OS grid reference: SD496588
- Civil parish: Scotforth
- District: Lancaster
- Shire county: Lancashire
- Region: North West
- Country: England
- Sovereign state: United Kingdom
- Website: Parish Council

Scotforth is a civil parish in City of Lancaster district, Lancashire, England. It does not include the suburb Scotforth, but is further south, comprising areas to the west, north and north-east of Lancaster University. The parish has an area of 645.86 hectares (1,596 acres) and had a population of 320 at the 2021 census.

The eastern boundary of the parish follows the course of the River Conder. Much of its area is in use for agriculture and reservoirs; the largest settlement is the hamlet of Bailrigg in the west, which is separated from the rest of the parish by the M6 motorway. The hamlet gives its name to the Bailrigg campus of the university.

There are five listed buildings in Scotforth: four houses and a bridge over the Conder. All are Grade II listed.

There are two reservoirs in the parish. Blea Tarn Reservoir was constructed in 1896–1901 and the BFI has a film by Mitchell and Kenyon of its opening in 1902. Langthwaite Reservoir was constructed in 1935, and United Utilities began work in 2018 on the construction of a floating solar farm on its surface.

Scotforth has a parish council.

== History ==
Scotforth was formerly a township, it became a civil parish in 1866. The parish formerly included the settlement: on 9 November 1900 the northern, urban, part of the parish was transferred to Lancaster and on 1 April 1935 a further 332 acres (134 ha) were transferred to Lancaster. The population of the parish was 1,139 in 1871, 2,263 in 1881 and 1,598 in 1891 but reduced to 251 in 1901.

== Exclave ==
Scotforth is one of 14 parishes in England still to contain a detached portion.
