= Listed buildings in Scotforth (parish) =

Scotforth is a civil parish in Lancaster, Lancashire, England. It does not include the suburb of Scotforth. It contains five listed buildings that are recorded in the National Heritage List for England. All of the listed buildings are designated at Grade II, the lowest of the three grades, which is applied to "buildings of national importance and special interest". The parish is mainly rural, and four of the listed buildings are houses, farmhouses and farm buildings. The other listed structure is a bridge crossing the River Conder that passes through the parish.

== Buildings ==
Name and location	Photograph	Date	Notes
Burrow Heights Cottages; 54.01450°N 2.80203°W	—	Late 17th century	A pair of stone houses with a roof of slate at the front and stone-slate at the rear. They are in two storeys, and have mullioned windows. No. 1 has three bays, and No 2. has one. The doorway of No 1. has a chamfered surround and a Tudor arched head.
Mount Vernon Farmhouse; 54.02085°N 2.75830°W	—	1701	The farmhouse is in sandstone with a slate roof, and has two storeys and an attic. The windows are mullioned, and there is a doorway with a moulded surround and an inscribed battlemented lintel. Inside the house is a bressumer.
Bailrigg Farmhouse; 54.01743°N 2.78577°W	—	1718	A sandstone house with a slate roof, in two storeys with an attic and two bays. The windows are mullioned, and the central doorway has a moulded surround and a shaped lintel inscribed with the date.
Lower Langthwaite Farmhouse and barn 54.02734°N 2.76302°W	—	1741	The house and barn are in stone, and have a corrugated iron roof. The house has two storeys and three bays. The original windows are mullioned, and there is a porch above which is an inscribed oval plaque. There is also a re-set carved datestone depicting a man with a staff, animals, and a tree. The barn to the right has two doorway, one wide and the other narrow.
Conder Mill Bridge; 54.02881°N 2.74964°W		18th century (possible)	The bridge carries Wyresdale Road over the River Conder. It is in sandstone, and consists of two segmental arches, with triangular cutwaters. It has pedestrian refuges and a solid parapet with rounded coping.
