= Listed buildings in Saundby =

Saundby is a civil parish in the Bassetlaw District of Nottinghamshire, England. The parish contains three listed buildings that are recorded in the National Heritage List for England. Of these, one is listed at Grade I, the highest of the three grades, and the others are at Grade II, the lowest grade. The parish contains the village of Saundby and the surrounding area. All the listed buildings are in thee village, and they consist of a church, a farmhouse and a former rectory.

== Key ==
Grade	Criteria
I	Buildings of exceptional interest, sometimes considered to be internationally important
II	Buildings of national importance and special interest

== Buildings ==
Name and location	Photograph	Date	Notes	Grade
St Martin of Tours' Church; 53.38288°N 0.82057°W		13th century	The church has been altered and extended through the centuries, including a restoration in 1823, a restoration and virtual rebuilding of the chancel by J. L. Pearson in 1885–86, and alterations to the north aisle in 1891–92. The church is built in stone with roofs of lead and slate, and it consists of a nave, a north aisle, a south porch, a chancel, a vestry and a west tower. The tower is dated 1504, and has a plinth, three stages, buttresses, two string courses, and an embattled parapet with eight crocketed pinnacles. It contains a west window with three lights and a moulded surround, a four-light window above, a clock face on the west side, and two-light lancet bell openings. There are also embattled parapets along the nave and the chancel.	I
Hall Farmhouse; 53.38334°N 0.82005°W	—	c. 1800	The farmhouse is in brick, with a floor band, and a slate roof with stone coped gables. There are two storeys and a cellar, a main range of three bays, and extensions at both ends. On the front is a doorway with a reeded surround, a geometrical fanlight, and a moulded hood. Some of the windows have fixed lights, and the others are horizontally-sliding sashes, some with segmental heads. The garden front has a central blocked opening flanked by canted bay windows with coped parapets.	II
The Grove; 53.38242°N 0.82187°W	—	Early 19th century	A rectory, later a private house, in colourwashed rendered brick on a rendered plinth, with a moulded cornice and a hipped slate roof. There are two storeys, an L-shaped plan, and a front of three bays. In the centre of the south front is a latticework porch with a lead tent roof, and most of the windows are sashes.	II
