= Pendock Church =

Coordinates: 52.0014°N 2.2679°W

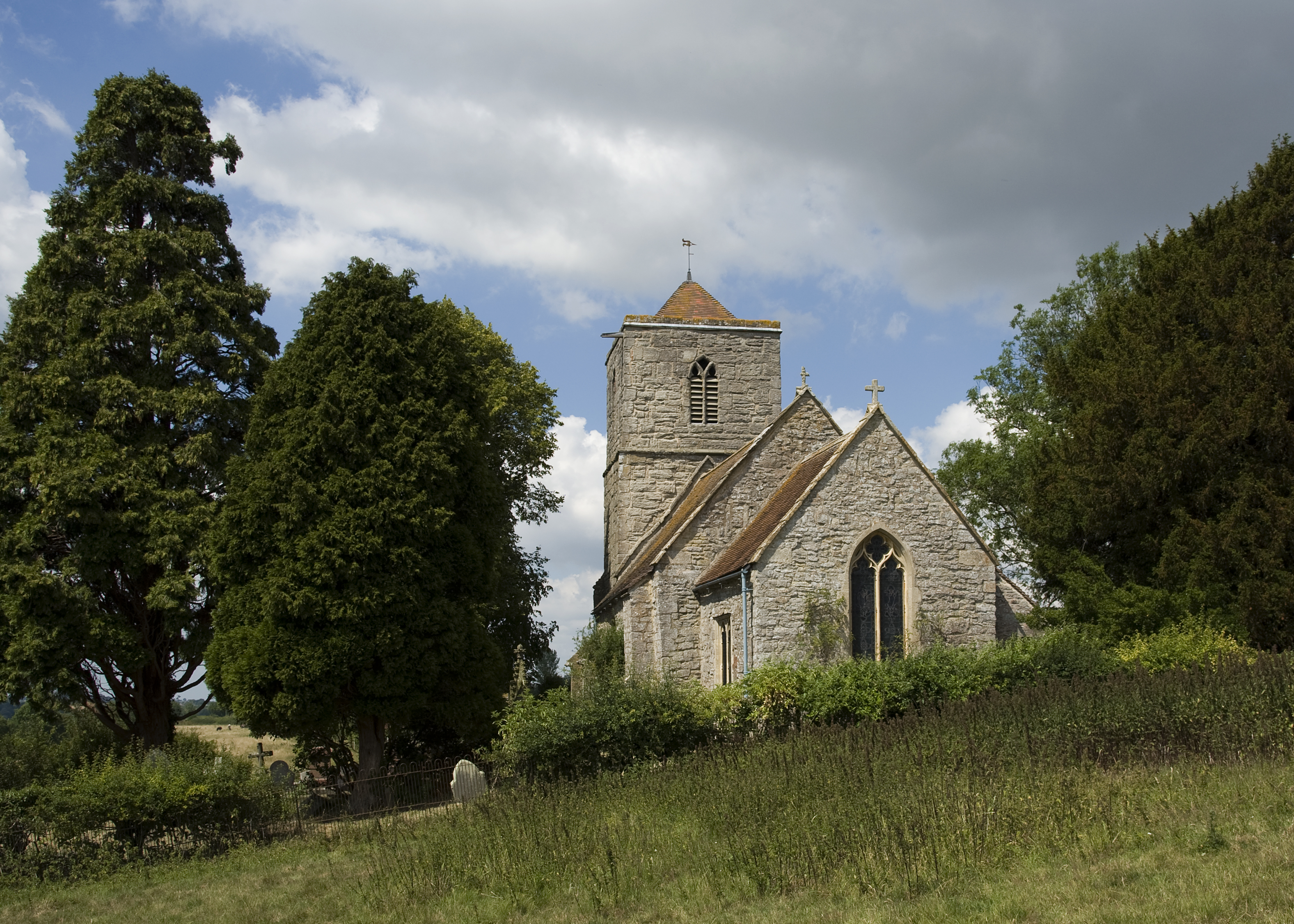
- East end of Pendock Church

- Location in Worcestershire
- OS grid reference: SO 817 336
- Location: Sledge Green, Pendock, Worcestershire
- Country: England
- Denomination: Anglican
- Website: Churches Conservation Trust

Architecture
- Functional status: Redundant
- Heritage designation: Grade I
- Designated: 25 March 1968
- Architectural type: Church
- Style: Norman, Gothic

Specifications
- Materials: Sandstone, tile roof

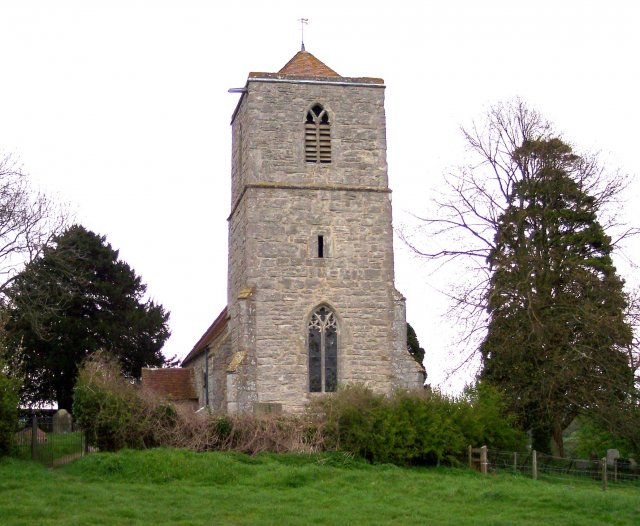
Church tower

Pendock Church is a redundant Anglican church standing to the southeast of the hamlet of Sledge Green in the parish of Pendock, Worcestershire, England. It is recorded in the National Heritage List for England as a designated Grade I listed building, and is under the care of the Churches Conservation Trust. It stands in an isolated position overlooking and to the north of the M50 motorway. To its north are the earthworks of a former medieval village.

== History ==
The church dates from the 12th century. Alterations and additions were made to it in the 14th century, and again in the 15th century when the west tower was built. The church was vested in the Churches Conservation Trust on 1 November 1987.

== Architecture ==
=== Exterior ===
It is constructed in sandstone rubble and has a tiled roof. Its plan consists of a two-bay nave with a north porch, a chancel with a roof at a lower level than the nave, a vestry to the north of the chancel, and a west tower. The nave measures 37 feet (11.3 m) by 18 feet (5.5 m), and the chancel 18 feet (5.5 m) by 12 feet (3.7 m). The tower is in three stages. In its lowest stage are diagonal buttresses, and a two-light west window; in the stage above is a thin rectangular window. The upper stage contains a two-light louvred bell opening on each side, and at the top is a parapet behind which is a pyramidal roof. The porch is timber-framed and the round-headed inner doorway is decorated with carvings, including chevrons. Also in the north wall of the nave is a two-light window under a pointed head. The south wall of the nave has two two-light windows between which is another round-headed doorway that is plain rather than decorated with carving. The south and east walls of the chancel each have a two-light window.

=== Interior ===
The nave and chancel ceilings are plastered. Above and to the left of the chancel arch are fragments of wall painting. In the chancel is a piscina with a triangular head. The communion rails dated from the 17th century and have turned balusters, and the pews contain linenfold panels. There are boards in the nave painted with the Lord's Prayer and the Creed. Under the tower are tiles with the Ten Commandments and the names of the churchwardens of 1851. The font dates from the 10th century; it is plain and simple, with a circular bowl on a circular base. The organ is a chamber organ of unknown date that was restored in 1978 by Nicholson & Co of Worcester. It is thought that Sir Edward Elgar may have played this organ. There is a ring of four bells. The oldest is dated 1686 by an unknown maker; there are two bells by Abel Rudhall, one cast in 1745 and 1753, and the fourth, originally of 1745 was recast in 1908 by H. Bond of Burford. The church plate includes a paten and flagon dated 1740, a bread knife with a silver handle of 1750, and a cup dated 1766.

== See also ==
- List of churches preserved by the Churches Conservation Trust in the English Midlands
