= St Martin of Tours' Church, Saundby =

Coordinates: 53.3828°N 0.8206°W

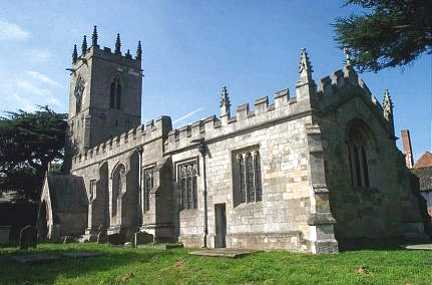
- St Martin of Tours' Church, Saundby, from the southeast

- Location in Nottinghamshire
- Location: Saundby, Nottinghamshire
- Country: England
- Denomination: Anglican
- Website: Churches Conservation Trust

History
- Dedication: Saint Martin of Tours

Architecture
- Functional status: Redundant
- Heritage designation: Grade I
- Designated: 1 February 1967
- Architect(s): John Loughborough Pearson; Weatherley and Jones (restorations)
- Architectural type: Church
- Style: Perpendicular Gothic
- Groundbreaking: 13th century

Specifications
- Materials: Stone, lead and slate roofs

St Martin of Tours' Church is a redundant Anglican church in the village of Saundby, Nottinghamshire, England. It is recorded in the National Heritage List for England as a designated Grade I listed building, and is under the care of the Churches Conservation Trust.

== History ==
The church originated in the 13th century, with additions and alterations in the 14th, 15th and 16th centuries. The arcade between the nave and the north aisle dates from the 13th century. The tower was added in 1504. The chancel was restored by John Loughborough Pearson in 1885–86, and the north aisle by Weatherley and Jones in 1891.

== Architecture ==
=== Exterior ===
St Martin's is constructed in stone, with lead and slate roofs. Externally, its style is Perpendicular. Its plan consists of a nave with a north aisle and a south porch, a chancel, a vestry, and a west tower. The tower consists of three stages, separated by string courses, standing on a plinth and supported by buttresses. It has a three-light west window, with a four-light window above it. The top stage contains a double-lancet bell opening on each side, and a clock face on the west side. At the summit is a battlemented parapet, and eight crocketted pinnacles. The battlemented parapet continues around the walls of the nave and chancel. The north aisle is in three bays. Its north wall contains a blocked doorway and three triple lancet windows, and there is a similar window in its east wall. The vestry has a blocked doorway on the west and a double lancet window with Decorated tracery. The chancel is in two bays with two crocketed pinnacles on each of the north and south parapets. The chancel windows are triple lancets, one on each of the north and east sides, and two on the south side. Between the windows on the south side is a priest's door. In the south wall of the nave are two double and one triple lancets. The south porch has a coped gable surmounted by a cross.

=== Interior ===
The arcade is carried on one circular and one rectangular pier. On the east wall of the chancel is an alabaster and mosaic reredos, and in the south wall is an elaborate 14th-century piscina with an ogee head. The font dates from the 19th century and consists of an egg-shaped bowl with a frieze decorated with lozenges. This is supported by five octagonal columns on a square base. The stained glass in the east window dating from 1865 is by Clayton and Bell, and stained glass elsewhere includes windows from 1885 by Kempe. In the northeast corner is an alabaster memorial dated 1599 to John Helwys. Also in the church is the effigy of a knight dating from the 14th century. There is a ring of five bells. One is undated, three were made by the firm of Oldfield and are dated 1605, 1620 and 1638, and the fifth was cast by John Taylor & Co of Loughborough.

== See also ==
- List of churches preserved by the Churches Conservation Trust in the English Midlands
- Grade I listed buildings in Nottinghamshire
- Listed buildings in Saundby
