= Brentingby =

Village in Leicestershire, England

Coordinates: 52.761°N 0.839°W

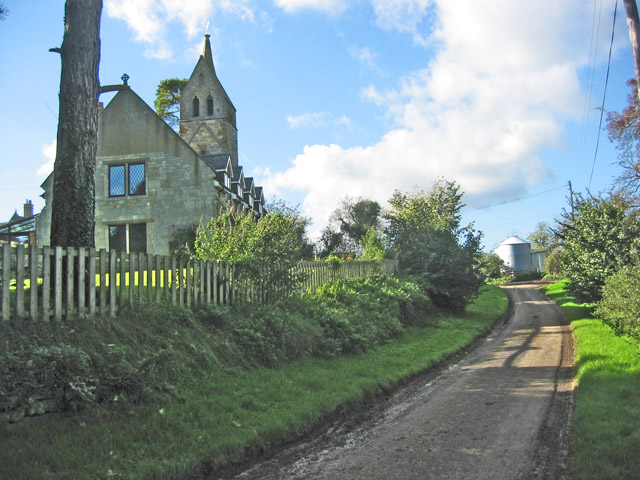
- The former parish church (Oct 2005)

- Location within Leicestershire
- OS grid reference: SK7818
- Civil parish: Freeby
- District: Borough of Melton
- Shire county: Leicestershire
- Region: East Midlands
- Country: England
- Sovereign state: United Kingdom
- Post town: Melton Mowbray
- Postcode district: LE14
- Police: Leicestershire
- Fire: Leicestershire
- Ambulance: East Midlands
- UK Parliament: Melton and Syston

Brentingby is a village in Leicestershire, England. The population is included in the civil parish of Freeby.

The village's name means either 'farm/settlement of Brenting/Branting' or 'farm/settlement at the steep place'.

== See also ==
- St Mary's Church, Brentingby
