= Lower Sapey =

Village in Worcestershire, England

Coordinates: 52.252989°N 2.45417°W

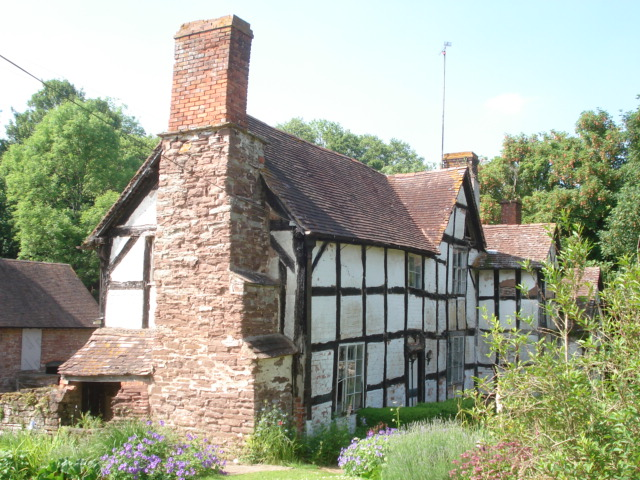
- Cottage next to the church at Lower Sapey

- Location within Worcestershire
- OS grid reference: SO690617
- Civil parish: Lower Sapey
- District: Malvern Hills
- Shire county: Worcestershire
- Region: West Midlands
- Country: England
- Sovereign state: United Kingdom
- Post town: WORCESTER
- Postcode district: WR6
- Police: West Mercia
- Fire: Hereford and Worcester
- Ambulance: West Midlands
- UK Parliament: West Worcestershire

Lower Sapey is a village and civil parish in the Malvern Hills District in the county of Worcestershire, England.

Sapey Pritchard was in the upper division of Doddingtree Hundred.

The name Sapey possibly derives from the Old English sæpig meaning 'sappy', perhaps an old stream name.

== See also ==
- Old St Bartholomew's Church, Lower Sapey
