= Fledborough =

Coordinates: 53.240°N 0.783°W

- Hamlet and Civil parish
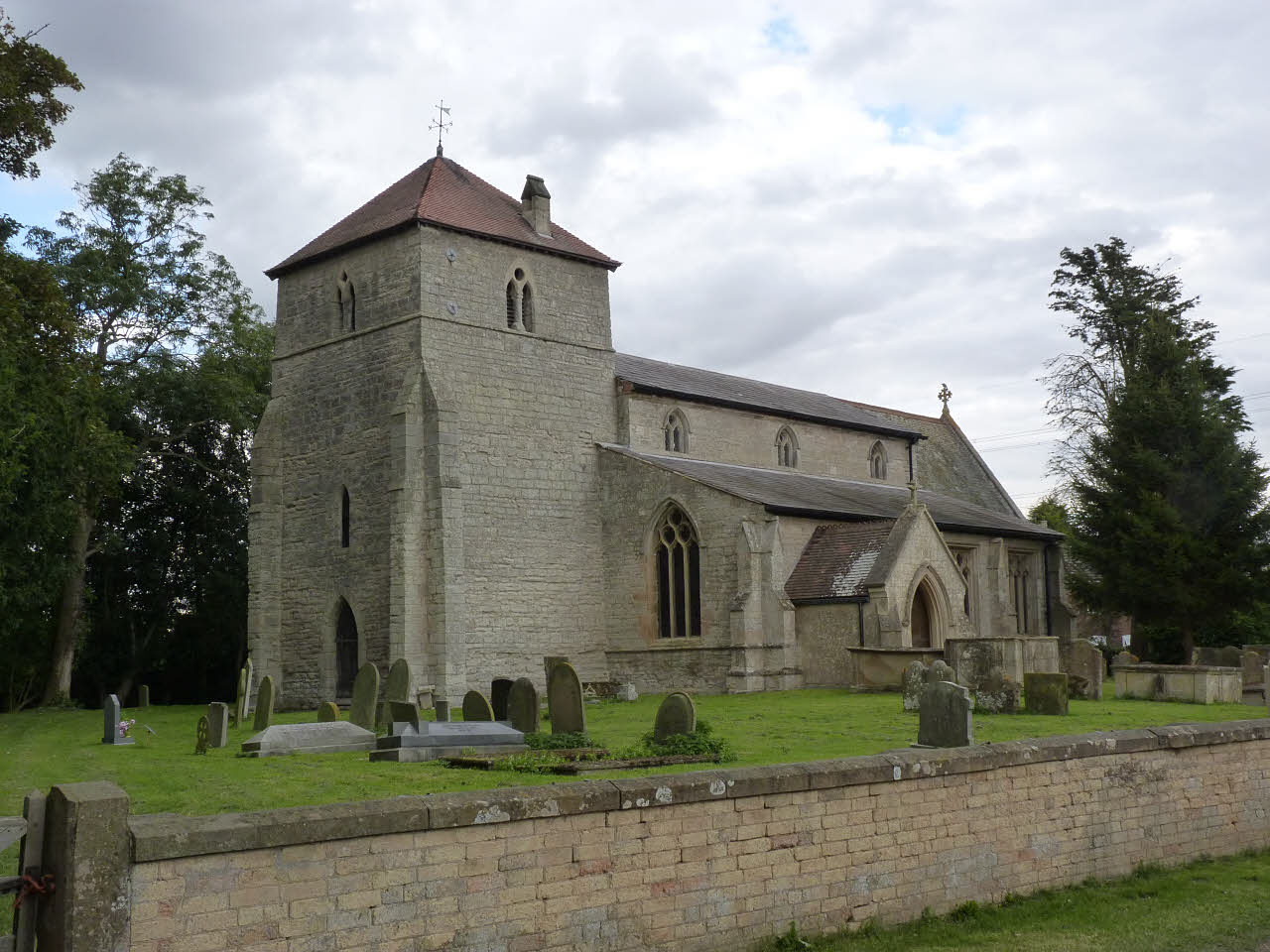
- St Gregory's Church, Fledborough

- Location within Nottinghamshire
- Interactive map of Fledborough
- Area: 2.28 sq mi (5.9 km^{2})
- Population: 38 (2021)
  - Density: 17/sq mi (6.6/km^{2})
- OS grid reference: SK 811721
  - London: 125 mi (201 km) SE
- District: Bassetlaw
- Shire county: Nottinghamshire
- Region: East Midlands
- Country: England
- Sovereign state: United Kingdom
- Post town: NEWARK
- Postcode district: NG22
- Dialling code: 01777
- Police: Nottinghamshire
- Fire: Nottinghamshire
- Ambulance: East Midlands
- UK Parliament: Newark
- Website: Dunham and district council

Fledborough is a hamlet in Nottinghamshire, England. Although now redundant, the Anglican parish church of St Gregory's, earned the hamlet the nickname of "the Gretna Green of the Midlands" in the 18th century, due to the ease in which couples could obtain a marriage licence from the Reverend W. Sweetapple.

The Bassett family effectively owned Fledborough from the fourteenth century to the seventeenth.

In the UK census of 2021, the population was reported at 38 residents.

== Archeology ==
The church consists of a nave, chancel, tower, north and south aisles, and a porch. According to historical records, a church is mentioned in the Domesday Book, although no remaining structure is known from the late Saxon period. The majority of the current church dates back to the time when the Lisures family held the manor and advowson.

The oldest section of the church is the tower, which dates back to the late 12th century. It features lower Norman architecture and displays stonework at the foundation level that suggests an earlier construction. The tower is adorned with angled buttresses and a pointed chamfered-arched west doorway, including a wooden door. Above the doorway, there is a single chamfered and deep inner-splayed lancet window. The tower arch, also from the late 12th century, is pointed and chamfered, with chamfered imposts. A string course separates the upper stage of the tower, which dates from the 13th century. Within the belfry, there are four pointed-arch openings, each containing two arched lights separated by a shaft. Notably, the window heads on the east and west sides have a lozenge cut, while the ones on the north and south sides feature a circle. Interestingly, the east wall of the tower shows signs of an earlier and higher roofline, suggesting that the east-facing belfry window once opened into the nave. The tower is crowned with a pyramidal roof, likely replicating the shape of the original late Saxon structure. Additionally, there is a chimney opening on the southern side, which was used for a former heating boiler.

== See also ==
- Listed buildings in Fledborough
- Fledborough railway station
- Fledborough Viaduct
