= Saundby =

Village and civil parish in Nottinghamshire, England

Coordinates: 53.382°N 0.820°W

- Hamlet and civil parish
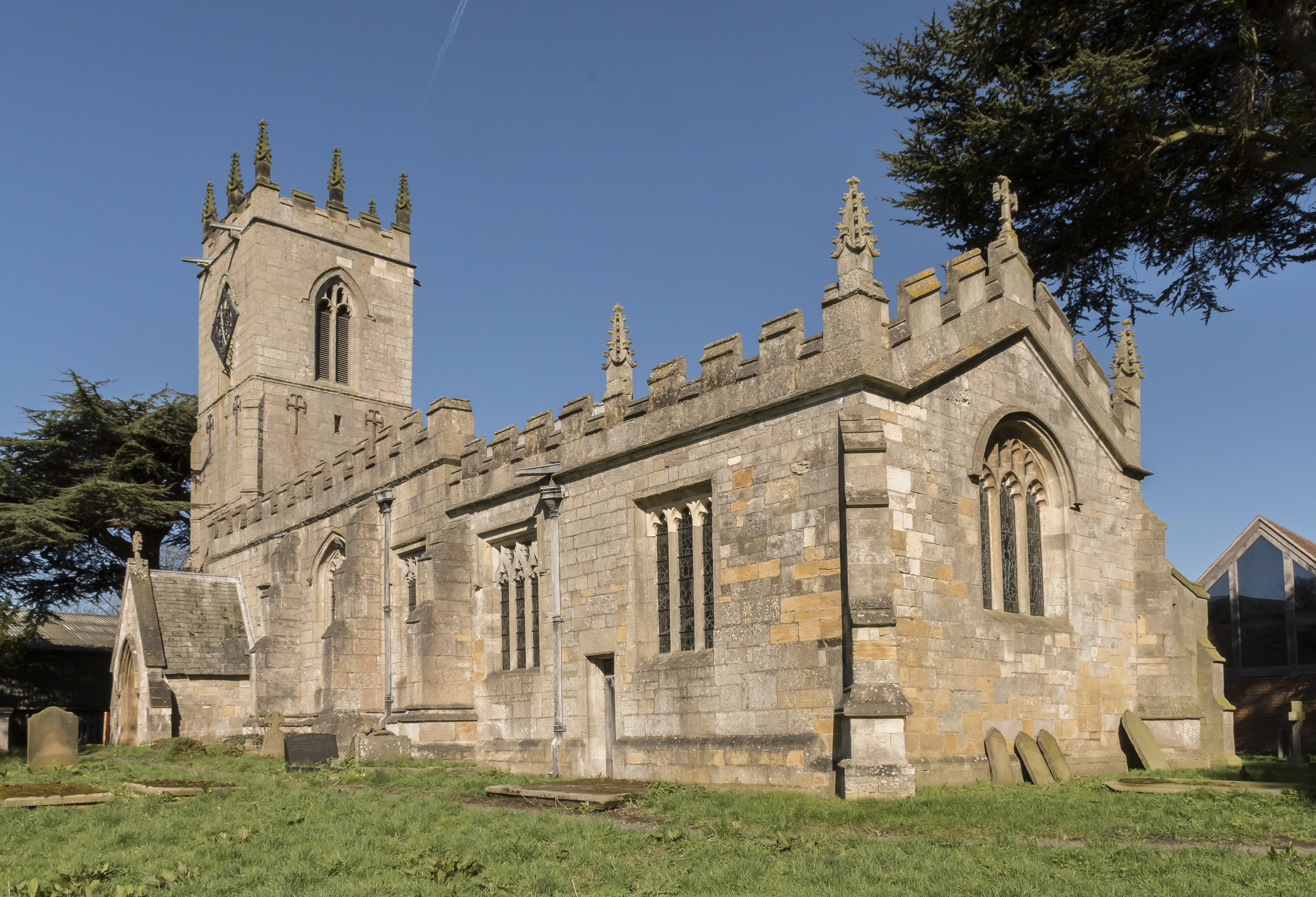
- St Martin's church, Saundby

- Location within Nottinghamshire
- Interactive map of Saundby
- Area: 2.24 sq mi (5.8 km^{2})
- Population: 88 (2021)
  - Density: 39/sq mi (15/km^{2})
- OS grid reference: SK 7854587981
  - London: 130 mi (210 km) SSE
- District: Bassetlaw
- Shire county: Nottinghamshire
- Region: East Midlands
- Country: England
- Sovereign state: United Kingdom
- Post town: Retford
- Postcode district: DN22
- Dialling code: 01427
- Police: Nottinghamshire
- Fire: Nottinghamshire
- Ambulance: East Midlands
- UK Parliament: Bassetlaw
- Website: www.beckinghamcumsaundby-pc.gov.uk

Saundby is a hamlet and civil parish in Nottinghamshire two miles west of Gainsborough. Although it comes under Beckingham cum Saundby parish council, by 2011 it had become a separate civil parish in its own right. The parish is bordered on one side by the River Trent. The village Church of St Martin was extensively restored in 1885.

== Profile ==
Saundby Origin – Saun+by (+by – farmstead of) Danish origin, possibly when the Danes travelled inland up the River Idle and settled in the area). Saundby is a small hamlet adjoining Beckingham with a population reported in the census of 2021 of 88. Saundby was a village of farmstead and small holdings. At one point a cheese farm existed as a way of dealing with excess milk that arose when the school canteens were closed.

== Geography ==
There was a Little Chef at the 'North Notts Garage', built in August 1972 at Ramper Top.

=== Population ===
The very small population of around 100 people in Saundby has had little or no change in the last 50 years. The population was measured at 165 at the 2011 census (including Beckingham), and 88 for the 2021 census.

== History ==
A worker with Eve Transmission, 33 year old Jeremy Dunn, from Allerton Grange Close in Leeds, fell to his death from an electrical 400kV transmission tower on Tuesday 22 June 1993, north of West Burton power station. The electrical transmission line lies to the east of the village. Eve Transmission was in Sutton-in-Ashfield; in 1989 another employee, 30 year old Simon Bulmer, at Ossington, fell 60 ft from a pylon at 12.30pm on Wednesday 25 October 1989, and had to be taken to the Queen's Medical Centre by police escort.

== See also ==
- Listed buildings in Saundby

== External sites ==
- YouTube video - parish visit journal
