= Avon Dassett =

Village in Warwickshire, England

Coordinates: 52.14577°N 1.40132°W

- Location within Warwickshire
- Population: 210 (2011)
- OS grid reference: SP410498
- Civil parish: Avon Dassett
- District: Stratford-on-Avon
- Shire county: Warwickshire
- Region: West Midlands
- Country: England
- Sovereign state: United Kingdom
- Post town: SOUTHAM
- Postcode district: CV47
- Police: Warwickshire
- Fire: Warwickshire
- Ambulance: West Midlands

Avon Dassett is a village and civil parish in the Stratford district of Warwickshire, England, nestling among the Burton Dassett Hills about four miles east of Kineton and seven miles north of Banbury in Oxfordshire. According to the 2001 and the 2011 censuses it had a population of 210.

== Etymology ==
The name Dassett is first attested for this location in the Domesday Book of 1086 as Derceto and in 1173 as Derchet. This name comes from the Common Brittonic words that survive in modern Welsh as derw ("oaks") and coed ("woodland"), referring to the adjacent wolds. This Brittonic name, thought to be found also in Dosthill and Burton Dasset, was then extended to specify that the settlement in question was in the part of Dassett on the River Avon. This extended name is first attested in 1185, as Afnederceth.

== Famous people ==
Israel Tonge was at one stage appointed rector of Avon Dassett, although according to Tonge "illegall practices" prevented him taking up the position. Avon Carrow is located in Avon Dassett, the former residence of John Profumo, the local MP in the 1960s. He was central to the Profumo affair, a sex and spy scandal in that era.

== See also ==
- St John the Baptist's Church, Avon Dassett
