= Pendock =

Village in Worcestershire, England

Coordinates: 51.99053°N 2.31452°W

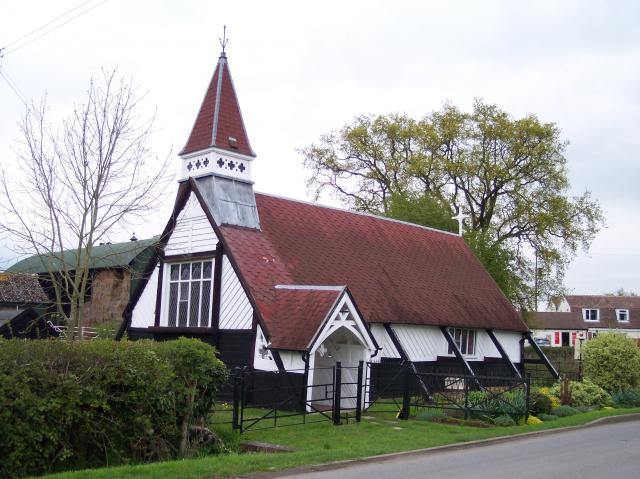
- Pendock Cross Church, Pendock

- Location within Worcestershire
- Population: 295 (2021)
- OS grid reference: SO785325
- Civil parish: Pendock
- District: Malvern Hills
- Shire county: Worcestershire
- Region: West Midlands
- Country: England
- Sovereign state: United Kingdom
- Post town: Gloucester
- Postcode district: GL19
- Police: West Mercia
- Fire: Hereford and Worcester
- Ambulance: West Midlands
- UK Parliament: West Worcestershire

Pendock is a village and civil parish in the Malvern Hills District in the county of Worcestershire, England, situated about halfway between the towns of Tewkesbury and Ledbury. The name is probably from old Welsh, possibly penn heddioc, meaning 'head of the barley field.

The civil parish constitutes two detached parts, with Lower Pendock containing the main (present-day) village with its church, and school situated at or near Pendock Cross(roads), and Upper Pendock containing the hamlet of Sledge Green and the old parish church (see below); the parish of Berrow cuts between the two parts of Pendock parish.

The population was recorded at 295 at the 2021 census and was 341 at the previous census in 2011.

Pendock has two churches, and a primary school — the Pendock CE Primary School is a small voluntary-controlled school with full healthy school status and a bronze eco award.

The M50 motorway passes through the parish, with the nearest junction being number 2, to the west of Pendock.

== History ==
Pendock Church dates from the 12th century. Alterations and additions were made to it in the 14th century, and again in the 15th century when the west tower was built. The church was vested in the Churches Conservation Trust on 1 November 1987.

To its north are the earthworks of a former medieval village.

The prolific nineteenth-century writer on Worcestershire John Noake, in his 1868 Guide to Worcestershire notes that: "Rev. W. S. Symonds, the eminent geologist, is lord of the manor, patron and incumbent of the living."

Pendock Cross church, also known as The Redeemer Church, was built in 1899 as a temporary mission church, but is still in use. It has an outdoor font which is stacked up on bricks.

Gadfield Elm Chapel, the oldest chapel of The Church of Jesus Christ of Latter-day Saints in the world, is in the parish.

== Pendock Church ==
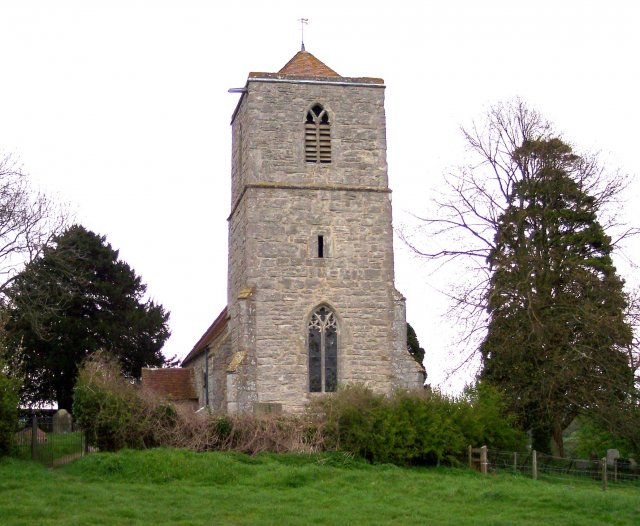
Pendock Church

Pendock Church is a redundant Anglican church standing to the southeast of the hamlet of Sledge Green. It is designated by English Heritage as a Grade I listed building, and is under the care of the Churches Conservation Trust. It stands in an isolated position overlooking and to the north of the motorway.

== Sources ==
- Watts, Victor Ernest, ed. (2004). The Cambridge Dictionary of English Place-Names. Cambridge University Press. ISBN 9781107196896.
