= Shipton, Gloucestershire =

Civil parish in Gloucestershire, England

Coordinates: 51°52′0″N 1°56′40″W

Shipton
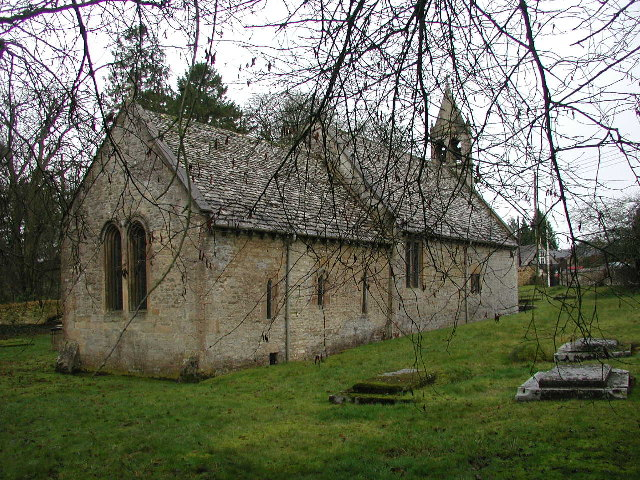
- St Oswald's Church in Shipton Oliffe

- Location within Gloucestershire
- Population: 365 (2011 Census)
- Civil parish: Shipton
- District: Cotswold
- Shire county: Gloucestershire
- Region: South West
- Country: England
- Sovereign state: United Kingdom
- Post town: Cheltenham.
- Postcode district: GL54
- Police: Gloucestershire
- Fire: Gloucestershire
- Ambulance: South Western
- UK Parliament: North Cotswolds
- Website: Shipton Parish Council

Shipton is a civil parish in the Cotswold district, in the county of Gloucestershire, England. The parish includes the twin villages of Shipton Oliffe and Shipton Solars, situated 7 miles (11 km) from Cheltenham. The River Coln, a small stream at this point, flows through the villages over two fords and innumerable little water splashes, creating ornamental lakes in private properties. The population of the parish at the 2011 census was 365.

The Gloucestershire Way long-distance footpath passes through the village.

Shipton Oliffe is represented by the county councillor for Northleach division and the district councillor for Sandywell ward on Cotswold District Council.

== History ==
The name Shipton, meaning "sheep farmstead", indicates that sheep farming occurred here long before the Norman invasion. The Domesday Book refers to two manors, Oliffe and Solers, each with its own church. The former rectory of St Oswald's, Shipton Olife, is a Grade II listed Victorian baronial house, built in 1863 by Thomas Fulljames. The parish was formed on 29 September 1871 from "Shipton Oliffe" and "Shipton Sollars".

== See also ==
- St Mary's Church, Shipton Solars
