= Furtho =

Coordinates: 52.0799°N 0.8739°W

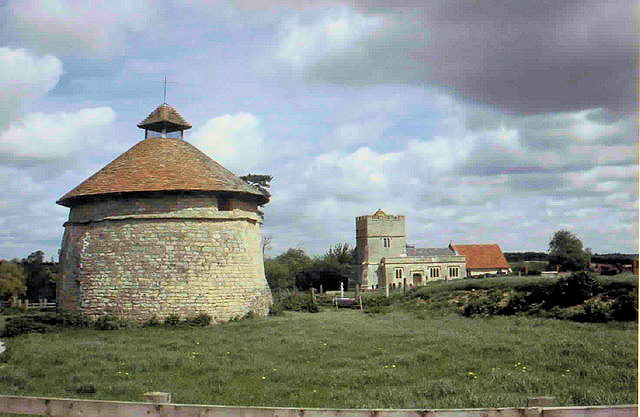
- Manor Dovecote (left foreground) and St Bartholomew's church (right background)

- Location within Northamptonshire
- OS grid reference: SP772429
  - London: 55 miles (89 km)
- Civil parish: Potterspury
- Unitary authority: West Northamptonshire
- Ceremonial county: Northamptonshire
- Region: East Midlands
- Country: England
- Sovereign state: United Kingdom
- Post town: Towcester
- Postcode district: MK19 6
- Dialling code: 01908
- Police: Northamptonshire
- Fire: Northamptonshire
- Ambulance: East Midlands
- UK Parliament: Current: Northampton South 2015 General Election: South Northamptonshire
- Website: Potterspury Parish Council

Furtho is a deserted medieval village and former civil parish, now in the parish of Potterspury, in West Northamptonshire, England. In 1931 the parish had a population of 25.

The origin of the village's name is uncertain: 'before the hill-spur' or 'ford hill-spur' are conjectured.

Furtho is east of Potterspury, west of Cosgrove and about 2 miles (3 km) northwest of Stony Stratford. The nearest towns are Wolverton 3 miles (5 km) to the southeast and Towcester 5 miles (8 km) to the northwest.

== Manor ==
Furtho was a parish of 693 acres (280 ha) and bounded on one side by the River Tove. The Domesday Book of 1086 recorded three estates totalling less than four hides, all held of Robert, Count of Mortain. The largest was a manor of two hides that by the 1240s was held by a Walter de Furtho. In 1452, William Fortho, esquire was resident in Fortho or Furtho.

The village was depopulated by the Furtho family inclosing its land in the late 16th and early 17th centuries. In 1572 Thomas Furtho inclosed the demesnes and gave villagers 20 acres (8 ha) of land in the common fields in exchange for their plots and for giving up their ancient right of way to Watling Street. In 1621 Edward Furtho died without issue so the Furtho estate passed to his surviving sisters Anne Staunton and Nightingale Mansel. The Stauntons sold their half in 1625 to Sir Robert Banastre. He died in 1649, leaving his estate to his grandson Banastre Maynard, 3rd Baron Maynard, who sold the estate in 1666.

The manor house has been lost but its 15th-century dovecote survives. It was restored in 1917 and 1990. Its present conical roof is 20th-century and the upper stage is only partially complete. It is a Grade II* listed building.

There is a "Furtho Manor Farm" but it is a more modern, red-brick building unconnected with the lost manor house. It is now a guest house.

== Parish church ==
The Church of England parish church of St Bartholomew is partly 12th- and 14th-century, but was mostly rebuilt in 1620. It was last used for worship in 1921, when the ecclesiastical parish was united with that of St Peter's, Potterspury.

St Bartholomew's is now in the care of the Churches Conservation Trust. It is a Grade II* listed building.

== Economic and social history ==
By the 1720s only four houses remained in Furtho, and by the 1830s this had declined to two. On 1 April 1951 the parish was abolished and merged with Potterspury, parts went to Cosgrove and Old Stratford.

== Sources ==
- Pevsner, Nikolaus (1961). Northamptonshire. The Buildings of England. Harmondsworth: Penguin Books. p. 221. OCLC 1184168995.
- Riden, Philip; Insley, Charles, eds. (2002). A History of the County of Northampton. Victoria County History. Vol. 5: The Hundred of Cleley. London: Institute of Historical Research. pp. 127–142. ISBN 1904356028.
