= Ozleworth =

Village in Gloucestershire, England

Coordinates: 51.6397°N 2.3012°W

- Location within Gloucestershire
- Civil parish: Ozleworth
- District: Cotswold
- Shire county: Gloucestershire
- Region: South West
- Country: England
- Sovereign state: United Kingdom
- Post town: WOTTON-UNDER-EDGE
- Postcode district: GL12
- Dialling code: 01453
- Police: Gloucestershire
- Fire: Gloucestershire
- Ambulance: South Western
- UK Parliament: South Cotswolds

Ozleworth is a village and civil parish in Gloucestershire, England, approximately 30 km (19 mi) south of Gloucester. It lies in the Cotswolds, an Area of Outstanding Natural Beauty.

== History ==
Ozleworth was known as Oslan wyrth in 940, derived from the Old English words ōsle + worth. meaning either "enclosure of a man named Ōsla" or "enclosure frequented by blackbirds" (or ouzels). It was listed as Osleworde in the Domesday Book of 1086.

== Governance ==
Ozleworth is part of the Grumbolds Ash ward of the district of Cotswold, represented by one Councillor. It is part of the constituency of South Cotswolds, represented in Parliament by Liberal Democrat MP Roz Savage. It was part of the South West England constituency of the European Parliament prior to Britain leaving the European Union in January 2020.

== Geography ==
Ozleworth is in the county of Gloucestershire, and lies within the Cotswolds, a range of hills designated an Area of Outstanding Natural Beauty. It is approximately 30 km (19 mi) south of Gloucester and approximately 32 km (20 mi) south west of Cirencester. Ozleworth's post town Wotton-under-Edge is approximately 4 km (2.5 mi) to the west. Nearby villages include Alderley, Wortley, Tresham, Leighterton, Lasborough, Newington Bagpath, Owlpen, and Kingscote.

== Newark Park ==
Newark Park is a National Trust property which was once a Tudor hunting lodge built by the Poyntz family, anciently feudal barons of Curry Mallet in Somerset, later of Iron Acton in Gloucestershire.

== Church ==
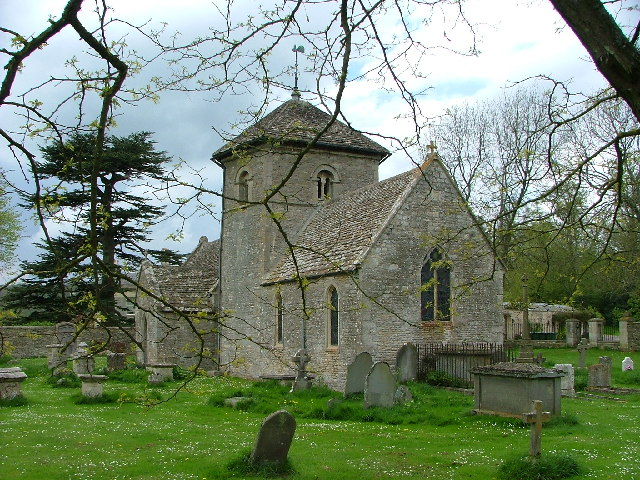
St. Nicholas church

The Norman church, which is dedicated to Saint Nicholas of Myra, is known to have been in existence in 1131. It has a cruciform structure, with one bell. It has an unusual hexagonal tower located in the centre of the church between the nave and the chancel. The current nave and font were added in the early 13th century. Archaeological evidence suggests that there was no nave before this time and that the tower originally formed part of the western wall of the church. The churchyard is circular. No longer active, the church is looked after by the Churches Conservation Trust.

== Notable people ==
- Bruce Chatwin, novelist, travel writer and journalist, lived in the village.
- Charles Tomlinson, poet, translator and academic, lived in the village.
