= Billesley, Warwickshire =

Village and civil parish in Warwickshire, England

Coordinates: 52°12′N 1°47′W

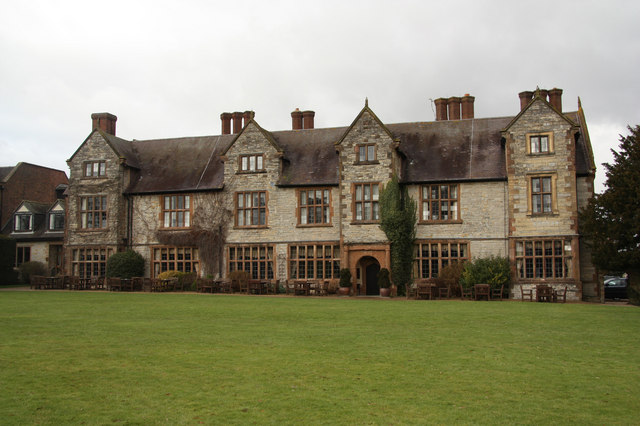
Billesley Manor, now a hotel

Billesley is a village and civil parish in the Stratford district of Warwickshire, England, between Stratford and Alcester. According to the 2001 Census, the parish had a population of 46.

Billesley is mentioned in the Domesday Book, and is so called because 'The Lea' belonged to Billesley. It had a population of about 150 at that time, which diminished following the Black Death.

Billesley Manor dates from c.1610 and is a Grade II* listed building. It is now operating as a hotel, and claims that a room in the building is the location in which Shakespeare's As You Like It was written. Authority for this is modern and originated in a claim in 1976 in Folklore of Warwickshire by Roy Palmer. The play is understood to be first performed in 1599, a decade before the building's stated date of construction in around 1610.

The settlement has a church. All Saints Church, Billesley is not registered for marriages and comes under the Parish of Wilmcote. Of particular interest to architectural historians are the traditional closed family pews, as well as the miniature lofts; the church itself is of 18th-century design. Billesley Manor holds a key to the church.
