= Staunton–Morphy controversy =

The Staunton–Morphy controversy concerns the failure of negotiations in 1858 for a chess match between Howard Staunton and Paul Morphy and later interpretations of the actions of the two players. The details of the events are not universally agreed, and accounts and interpretations often show strong national bias.

== Continuing uncertainties and controversy ==
In the words of chess journalist Mark Weeks, "Staunton represents a unique challenge to chess history. Many players immediately associate his name with Paul Morphy, as in 'Staunton ducked a match with Morphy'. ... This is extremely unfair, as it concentrates the focus on Staunton to a relatively minor, factually controversial incident, while it ignores his significant achievements." As Edward Winter writes, "The issue of national bias does, unfortunately, require consideration in the Staunton–Morphy affair." When editing World Chess Champions (Oxford, 1981), Winter chose an Englishman to write about Staunton and an American to write about Morphy.

== Backgrounds of the players ==
=== Staunton ===
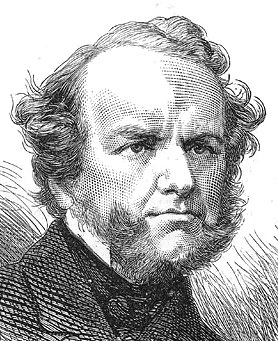
Howard Staunton

Howard Staunton (April 1810 – June 22, 1874) was an English chess master who won a match in Paris in 1843 against the Frenchman Pierre Charles Fournier de Saint-Amant, and was regarded as the world's strongest player from 1843 to 1851 by many contemporary commentators, by later 19th-century commentators and by 20th-century world champion Garry Kasparov. According to match records collected by Jeremy P. Spinrad, the only players who were successful against Staunton without receiving odds from 1840 to 1851 were: Saint-Amant, who won the first and lost the second and longer of their matches in 1843; Adolf Anderssen, who eliminated Staunton from the 1851 London International tournament and won the event; and Elijah Williams, who beat Staunton in the play-off for third place in the same tournament. The statistical website Chessmetrics ranks Staunton as world number one from May 1843 to August 1849, in the top ten from July 1851 to May 1853, and in the top five from June 1853 to January 1856.

Staunton proposed and was the principal organizer of the 1851 London International Tournament, which was the first ever international tournament. His disappointing fourth place in the tournament may indicate that he had over-loaded himself by being both secretary of the organizing committee and a competitor. The 1851 tournament and his subsequent match against Williams effectively ended Staunton's competitive career. Although Anderssen, who won the tournament, accepted Staunton's challenge for a match after the tournament, circumstances prevented them from playing it. In 1853 while in Brussels, Staunton played an impromptu match against von der Lasa but had to abandon it because of heart trouble, and von der Lasa later wrote that in his opinion Staunton had no chance of being physically fit enough for serious competition after 1853.

Staunton was also an influential chess journalist and writer of chess books, and in 1847 embarked on an additional career as a Shakespearean scholar, gaining the respect of his contemporaries and of modern writers in that field also. After the end of his competitive chess career, he remained an active writer about both chess and Shakespeare until his death, and was at work when he died.

=== Morphy ===
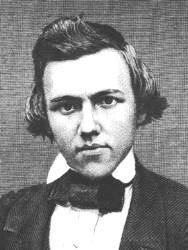
Paul Morphy

Paul Morphy (June 22, 1837 – July 10, 1884) was an American chess prodigy who learned the game as a young child simply from watching others play. In 1850, when Morphy was twelve, the strong professional Hungarian chess master Johann Löwenthal visited New Orleans where Morphy beat him 3–0. Morphy played little chess in his teens, concentrating instead on his studies, but was invited to play in the 1857 American Chess Congress. This was a knock-out tournament in which each round was a mini-match. Morphy, then 20 years old, lost only one game (to Louis Paulsen) while drawing three, two of them in the final which he won 6–2 (5 wins, one loss, and two draws) against Louis Paulsen, a German-American whom Chessmetrics rates as one of the world's top 10 from the late 1850s to the early 1890s.

The New Orleans Chess Club then issued a challenge on Morphy's behalf for a match against Staunton, who was still famous for his dominance in the late 1840s and for his influential chess writings. Morphy and his friends took Staunton's response to be an acceptance of the challenge, and Morphy set off for England in mid-1858.

While the negotiations with Staunton dragged on, Morphy spent most of his time in London and Paris, where he achieved crushing victories against other top players of the time: 10–4 against Löwenthal; 5½–2½ against Daniel Harrwitz; 8–3 against Adolf Anderssen, who had won the 1851 London International Tournament and later won the 1862 London Tournament; and 7½–½ in 1859 against Augustus Mongredien.

Morphy proved so much stronger than his contemporaries that Chessmetrics rates him the world's top player from 1858 until early 1862, 3 years after Morphy announced his retirement from chess. It is difficult to compare Morphy objectively with more recent top-class players because he was so far ahead of his opponents.

== The events of 1858 ==
=== Initial challenge and response ===
In the mid-1850s Staunton obtained a contract with the publishers Routledge to edit the text of Shakespeare. This edition appeared in parts from 1857 to 1860, and Staunton's work was praised by experts. While Staunton was busy with the Shakespeare edition, he received a courteous letter from the New Orleans Chess Club, inviting him to that city to play Paul Morphy, who had won the 1857 First American Chess Congress; This challenge, which was sent in February 1858, proposed that the stake should be $5,000 and that, if Staunton lost, he would be paid $1,000 to cover expenses. The proposed stake would be worth about $877,000 in 2007's money. Interestingly, the Chess Club had not negotiated with Morphy before sending the letter.

Staunton replied on April 4, 1858:

Gentlemen:
In reply to your very courteous proposal for me to visit New Orleans for the purpose of encountering Mr. Paul Morphy at Chess, permit me to mention that for many years professional duties have compelled me to abandon the practice of the game almost entirely except in the most desultory manner, and at the present time these duties are so exacting that it is with difficulty I am enabled to snatch one day out of seven for exercise and relaxation.
Under the circumstances you will at once perceive that a long and arduous chess contest, even in this Metropolis, would be an enterprise too formidable for me to embark in without ample opportunity for the recovery of my old strength in play, together with such arrangements as would prevent the sacrifice of my professional engagements for the sake of a match at chess, and that the idea of undertaking one in a foreign country, many thousand miles from here, is admissible only in a dream.
With friendly greetings to my proposed antagonist, whose talent and enthusiasm no one can more highly estimate, and with compliments to you for the honor implied in your selection of me as the opponent of such a champion, I beg to subscribe myself, with every consideration.
Yours obediently,
H. Staunton

On the same day Staunton wrote in his column in the Illustrated London News:

Proposed Chess Match between England and America for One Thousand Pounds a Side.—We have been favoured with a copy of the defi which the friends of Mr. Paul Morphy, the Chess champion of the United States, have transmitted to Mr. Staunton. The terms of this cartel are distinguished by extreme courtesy, and with one notable exception, by extreme liberality also. The exception in question, however, (we refer to the clause which stipulates that the combat shall take place in New Orleans!) appears to us utterly fatal to the match; and we must confess our astonishment, that the intelligent gentlemen who drew up the conditions did not themselves discover this. Could it possibly escape their penetration, that if Mr. Paul Morphy, a young gentleman without family ties or professional claims upon his attention, finds it inconvenient to anticipate, by a few months, an intended voyage to Europe, his proposed antagonist, who is well known for years to have been compelled, by laborious literary occupation, to abandon the practice of Chess beyond the indulgence of an occasional game, must find it not merely inconvenient, but positively impracticable, to cast aside all engagements, and undertake a journey of many thousand miles for the sake of a Chess-encounter? Surely the idea of such, a sacrifice is not admissible for a single moment. If Mr. Morphy—for whose skill we entertain the liveliest admiration—be desirous to win his spurs among the Chess chivalry of Europe, he must take advantage of his purposed visit, next year; he will then meet in this country, in France, and Germany, and in Russia, many champions whose names must be as household words to him, ready to test and do honour to his prowess.

There has been debate ever since about whether Staunton's letter and article should be regarded as a polite refusal or a conditional acceptance of the challenge. Morphy, however, took Staunton's writing as a challenge. Although Staunton had not said anything about playing against Morphy, Morphy assumed that the match could easily be arranged once he just got to England.

Samuel Boden, who was then the chess editor of The Field, a prestigious English countryside and sporting magazine, disputed the Americans' selection of Staunton as representing the best that Europe had to offer:

...Now, we can see no possible objection to the acceptance of this challenge by Mr. Staunton, as a private individual, if he thinks it proper, and we have no doubt it was made in good faith by the New Orleans Chess Club; but.... we cannot avoid entering our protest against the selection on the part of our rivals of a champion for our side....that he is champion of even London alone, over the board, we unhesitatingly deny ... while on the Continent the idea of being considered the champion of Europe would be ridiculed as the height of absurdity....

Staunton did offer to play Morphy by electric telegraph, a technology whose progress and uses for chess he reported enthusiastically. However this offer arrived after Morphy had left for Europe – which perhaps was fortunate, as the newly laid cable broke down after a month and was not replaced until 1866.

=== Morphy sets off for Europe ===
When Morphy left New Orleans for Europe on May 31, 1858, he was still legally a minor, and would come of age on June 22, 1858. Hence he required his family's permission for the journey. However his immediate family opposed the trip on the grounds that it would delay his entry into the legal profession, and it took some time for one uncle and a family friend to persuade them to let him go. The New Orleans Chess Club also played a notable part in trying to persuade Morphy's family into letting him travel; it also offered to pay Morphy's travel expenses, but he declined this offer since he did not want to be seen as a professional chess player.

Morphy's explanation for the voyage was that he intended to play in the chess tournament that had been scheduled for 22 June 1858 in Birmingham. Staunton welcomed the news that "Mr. Paul Morphy has definitely settled to visit England and attend the meeting of the British Association at Birmingham...", which was the published aim of Morphy's visit.

=== After Morphy's arrival in England ===
Morphy arrived in Liverpool on June 20, 1858, and immediately caught the train to Birmingham. However, on arrival he found that the tournament had been postponed by two months, to August 24. Morphy traveled to London the following day but had fallen ill, and was not fit to visit the London chess clubs until June 23. The Illustrated London News, of which Staunton was the chess editor, printed an article "Arrival of Mr. Morphy" on June 26. At the St. George's club he met Staunton and re-issued the challenge, which Staunton accepted provided he was given a month to prepare. Although he declined to play a few casual games against Morphy, Staunton invited him to his home in Streatham, which in those days was a country village whose first railway station had opened only two years earlier. There they played a couple of consultation games, with Staunton partnered by John Owen and Morphy by Thomas Wilson Barnes. The Morphy-Barnes team defeated Staunton-Owen in both consultation games. A little later Staunton proposed that they delay their match until after the Birmingham tournament in August, and Morphy reluctantly agreed. Staunton announced in the Illustrated London News:

July 10 – Mr. Morphy has proffered to play Mr. Staunton a match of 21 games for a stake of 500 pounds a side, and the latter has accepted his challenge, conditionally that the terms of play are such as he can agree to without infraction of his present literary engagements. As there appears every disposition on the part of his opponent to meet his wishes in this respect the match will probably take place in London shortly after the Birmingham Meeting.

Around this time Morphy wrote asking friends in the US to send him the money for the stake. However, in late July 1858 his family informed his friend Charles Maurian that "they had resolved not only not to help raising the amount wanted but that moreover they should not allow him to play a money match either with his own money or anyone else's ... that he will be brought home by force if necessary; that they were determine to prevent a money match by all means." Maurian persuaded New Orleans Chess Club to send £500, but apparently it was not in Morphy's hands until early October.

Meanwhile, Morphy played and beat Johann Löwenthal. According to Morphy's personal assistant Frederick Edge, personal and political conflicts appeared around this time. Edge wrote that Owen, who was Morphy's second in this match, encouraged Löwenthal and disparaged Morphy, and that in disgust Morphy challenged Owen to a match, offering him odds of Pawn and move. Edge further claimed that Morphy insisted on giving odds because, if he played Owen at evens, Staunton would treat this as an excuse for delaying or abandoning the match with Morphy. The match with Löwenthal was interrupted as Löwenthal fell ill, and Morphy used the break to crush Owen 5–0 with two draws, despite the fact that Owen was a very strong player who later took third place in the 1862 London tournament and was the only player to win a game against the victor, Adolf Anderssen. In early August Staunton allowed a committee to be formed at the St. Georges' Chess Club to raise money for his share of the stake.

After finishing the match with Löwenthal, on 14 August 1858 Morphy wrote to Staunton:

Mr. Howard Staunton
Dear sir,
As we are now approaching the Birmingham meeting, at the termination of which you have fixed our match to commence, I think it would be advisable to settle the preliminaries during this week. Would you be good enough to state some early period when your seconds could meet mine, so that a contest which have so much at heart, and which your eminent position excites so much interest in the chess world, may be looked upon as a fait accompli.
I am dear sir, yours very respectfully,
Paul Morphy

Staunton replied that he needed more time to prepare, and Morphy wrote to him again:

August 21, 1858
......It is certainly a high compliment to so young a player as myself that you, whose reputation in the chess arena has been unapproached during so many long years, should require any preparation for our match. Immediately on my arrival in England, some two months since, I spoke to you in reference to our contest, and, in accepting the challenge, you stated that you should require some time to prepare, and you proposed a period for commencing which I accepted.
I am well aware that your many engagements in the literary world must put you to some inconvenience in meeting me, and I am therefore desirous to consult your wishes in every respect. Would you please state the earliest opportunity when those engagements will permit the match coming off, such time being consistent with your previous preparation.

The few weeks referred to in your favor seem to be rather vague, and I leave the terms entirely to yourself.

I remain dear sir.
yours very respectfully,
Paul Morphy

Chess historian G. H. Diggle wrote that, since 21 August 1858 was a Saturday and there was no mail delivery on Sundays, Morphy's letter would have arrived no earlier than the following Monday, when Staunton had to leave for Birmingham. Meanwhile, on Sunday 22 August Staunton's old enemy George Walker published an article in Bell's Life in London that accused Staunton of trying to postpone the match indefinitely:

Unless the day and hour for beginning the match are fixed, the whole is smoke, and the Chess Circle must draw its own conclusions. Morphy cannot afford to wait for an anniversary until the Days of Grace 1860.

On Saturday 28 August the Illustrated London News carried a letter signed by "Anti-book", which said:

As you surmise, "knowing the authority," the slang of the sporting pages in question regarding the proposed encounter between Mr. Staunton and the young American is "bunkum." In matches of importance, it is the invariable practice in this country, before anything definite is settled, for each party to be provided with representatives to arrange the terms and money for the stakes. Mr. Morphy has come here unfurnished in both respects; and, although both will no doubt be forthcoming in due time, it is clearly impossible, until they are, that any determinate arrangements can be made.
A statement of another contemporary that the reduction in the amount of stakes from £1000 a side to £500 a side was made at the suggestion of the English amateur is equally devoid of truth; the proposal to reduce the amount having been made by Mr. Morphy.

It is generally thought that "Anti-book" was Staunton himself. Diggle argued that Staunton must have dashed this off before catching the Birmingham train, as he was busy playing in the tournament on the 24th and 25th, while the 26th would have been too late for publication on the 28th; and that Staunton would have read Walker's attack on him before seeing Morphy's letter of 21 August.

Meanwhile, Morphy traveled to Birmingham, arriving on 26 August, too late to play in the tournament, but in time for a blindfold exhibition which he had previously offered to give at Queen's College on 27 August. When he met Staunton there, Staunton asked for more time, saying that his commitments to his publishers were taking up a lot of his time. Morphy asked, "Mr. Staunton, will you play in October, in November, or December? Choose your own time but let the decision be final." Staunton replied, "Well, Mr. Morphy, if you will consent to the postponement, I will play you the beginning of November. I will see my publishers and let you know the exact date in a few days."

Morphy used the postponement by travelling to Paris, where he beat Daniel Harrwitz (5½–2½). On 6 October 1858, Morphy wrote Staunton an open letter which was also circulated to several publications, in which Morphy stated his view of the situation:

Café de la Régence, Paris, October 6, 1858

Howard Staunton, Esq.

Sir:

– On my arrival in England, three months since, I renewed the challenge to you personally which the New Orleans Chess Club had given some months previously. You immediately accepted, but demanded a month's delay, in order to prepare yourself for the contest. Subsequently, you proposed that the time should be postponed until after the Birmingham meeting, to which I assented. On the approach of the period you had fixed, I addressed you a communication, requesting that the necessary preliminaries might be immediately settled, but you left London without replying to it.

I went to Birmingham for the express purpose of asking you to put a stop to further delay, by fixing a date for the opening of the match; but you stated that your time was much occupied in editing a new edition of Shakespeare, and that you were under heavy bonds to your publisher accordingly. But you reiterated your intention to play me, and said that if I would consent to a further postponement until the first week of November, you would, within a few days, communicate with me and fix the exact date. I have not heard further from you, either privately, by letter, or through the column of the Illustrated London News.

A statement appeared in the chess department of that Journal (the Illustrated London News) a few weeks since that "Mr. Morphy had come to Europe unprovided with backers or seconds – the inference being obvious, that my want of funds was the reason of our match not taking place. As you are the editor of that department of the Illustrated London News, I felt much hurt that a gentleman who had always received me at his club and elsewhere with great kindness and courtesy should allow so prejudicial a statement to be made in reference to me; one, too, which is not strictly consonant with fact.

In conclusion, I beg leave to state that I had addressed a copy of this letter to the editors of the Illustrated London News, Bell’s Life in London, the Era, the Field, and the Sunday Times; being most desirous that our true position should no longer be misunderstood by the community at large. I again request you to fix a date for our commencing the match.

Permit me to repeat what I have invariably declared in every Chess community I have had the honor of entering, that I am not a professional player – that I never wish to make any skill I possess the means of pecuniary advancement – and that my earnest desire is never to play for any stake but honor. My friends in New Orleans, however, subscribed a certain sum, without any countenance from me, and that sum has been ready for you to meet a considerable time past. Since my arrival in Paris I have been assured by numerous gentlemen, that the value of those stakes can be immediately increased to any amount, but, for myself, personally, reputation is the only incentive I recognize.

The matter of seconds cannot, certainly, offer any difficulty. I had the pleasure of being fast received in London by the St. George's Chess Club, of which you are so distinguished a member; and of those gentlemen, I request the honor of appointing my seconds, to whom I give full authority in settling all preliminaries.

In conclusion, I beg leave to state that I have addressed a copy of this letter to several editors, being most desirous that our true position should no longer be misunderstood by the community at large.

Again requesting you to fix the date for commencing our match,

I have the honor to remain, Sir,
Your very humble servant,

Paul Morphy

On October 7, Morphy wrote to the St. George's Chess Club:

Café de la Régence, Paris, October 7, 1858

T. Hampton, Esq., Secretary of St. George's Chess Club:

– I beg respectfully to inform you that the New Orleans Chess Club has deposited £500 at the Banking House of Messrs. Haywood & Co., London: that sum being my proportion of the stakes in the approaching match with Mr. Staunton.

I shall esteem it a great honor if the St. George's Chess Club will do me the favor of appointing my seconds in that contest. To such gentlemen as they may appoint I leave the settling of all preliminaries.

May I request you to lay this communication before the members of the Club and to oblige me with an early answer?

I have the honor to remain, Sir,
Your very humble and obed't servant,

Paul Morphy

On October 9, Staunton replied to Morphy's letter open letter of October 6, re-stating the difficulties he faced, but now using them as reasons to cancel the match:

London, October 9, 1858

Sir,

– In reply to your letter, I have to observe that you must be perfectly conscious that the difficulty in the way of engaging in a chess-match is one over which I have no control. You were distinctly appraised, in answer to the extraordinary proposal of your friends that I should leave my home, family and avocations, to proceed to New Orleans for the purpose of playing chess with you, that a long and arduous contest, even in London, would be an undertaking too formidable for me to embark in without ample opportunity for the recovery of my old strength in play, together with such arrangements as would prevent the sacrifice of my professional engagements. Upon your unexpected arrival here, the same thing was repeated to you, and my acceptance of your challenge was entirely conditional on my being able to gain time for practice.

The experience, however, of some weeks, during which I have laboured unceasingly, to the serious injury of my health, shows that not only is it impracticable for me to save time for that purpose, but that by no means short of giving up a great work on which I am engaged, subjecting the publishers to the loss of thousands, and myself to an action for breach of contract, could I obtain time even for the match itself. Such a sacrifice is, of course, out of all question.

A match at chess or cricket may be a good thing in its way, but none but a madman would for either forfeit his engagements and imperil his professional reputation. Under these circumstances, I waited only the termination of your last struggle with Mr. Harrwitz, to explain that, fettered as I am at this moment, it is impossible for me to undertake any enterprise which would have the effect of withdrawing me from duties I am pledged to fulfil.

The result is not, perhaps, what either you or I desired, as it will occasion disappointment to many; but it is unavoidable, and the less to be regretted, since a contest, wherein one of the combatants must fight under disadvantages so manifest as those I should have to contend against, after many years retirement from practical chess, with my attention absorbed and my brain overtaxed by more important pursuits, could never be accounted a fair trial of skill.
I have the honor to be,
Yours, &c. H. Staunton

Paul Morphy, Esq.

P.S. I may add that, although denied the satisfaction of a set encounter with you at this period, I shall have much pleasure, if you will again become my guest, in playing you a few games sans façon [informally].

On October 23, Staunton published his entire reply of October 9 along with a partial copy of Morphy's open letter of October 6, omitting the reference to the "Anti-book" letter about Morphy's lack of funds and seconds. Various chess columns then printed anonymous and acrimonious letters. Morphy took no part in any of this, but wrote to Lord Lyttelton, the president of the British Chess Association, explaining his own efforts to bring about the match, Staunton's efforts to avoid the match with everything short of admitting he didn't wish to play, and of Staunton's representation of the facts in the Illustrated London News, demanding "that you shall declare to the world it is through no fault of mine that this match has not taken place." Lyttelton replied:

Bodmin, Cornwall, 3rd November.

Dear Sir,

— I much regret that I have been unable till to-day to reply to your letter of October 26, which only reached me on the 1st inst. With regard to the appeal which you have made to the British Chess Association, I may perhaps be allowed to say, as its President, that I fear nothing can be done about the matter in question by that body. It is one of recent and rather imperfect organization; its influence is not yet fully established. It is practically impossible to procure any effective meeting of its members at present, and it is doubtful whether it would take any steps in the matter if it were to meet. I must therefore be understood as writing in my private character alone, but, at the same time, you are welcome, should you think it worthwhile (which I hardly think it can be), to make further use of this letter, in any manner you may wish.

Your letter has but one professed object; that we should declare that it is not your fault that the match between yourself and Mr. Staunton has not taken place. To this the reply might be made in two words. I cannot conceive it possible that any one should impute that failure to you, nor am I aware that any one has done so. But, in the circumstances, I shall not perhaps be blamed, if I go somewhat further into the matter. In the general circumstances of the case, I conceive that Mr. Staunton was quite justified in declining the match. The fact is understood, that he has for years been engaged in labours which must, whatever arrangements might be made, greatly interfere with his entering into a serious contest with a player of the highest force and in constant practice, and so far, the failure of the match is the less to be regretted. Nor can I doubt the correctness of his recent statement, that the time barely necessary for the match itself could not be spared, without serious loss and inconvenience both to others and to himself.

But I cannot but think, that in all fairness and considerate-ness, Mr. Staunton might have told you of this long before he did. I know no reason why he might not have ascertained it, and informed you of it in answer to your first letter from America. Instead of this, it seems to me plain, both as to the interview at which I myself was present, and as to all the other communications which have passed, that Mr. Staunton gave you every reason to suppose that he would be ready to play the match within no long time. I am not aware, indeed (nor do I perceive that you have said it), that you left America solely with the view of playing Mr. Staunton. It would, no doubt, make the case stronger, but it seems to me as unlikely as that you should have come, as has been already stated (anonymously, and certainly not with Mr. Staunton's concurrence), in order to attend the Birmingham Tournament. With regard to the suppressions of part of your last letter, I must observe, that I am not aware how far Mr. Staunton is responsible for what appears in the Illustrated London News. But whoever is responsible for that suppression, I must say that I cannot see how it is possible to justify or excuse it.

I greatly regret the failure of a contest which would have been of much interest, and the only one, as I believe, which could have taken place with you, with any chance of its redounding to the credit of this country. I still more regret that any annoyance or disappointment should have been undergone by one, who – as a foreigner – from his age, his ability, and his conduct and character, is eminently entitled to the utmost consideration in the European countries which he may visit.

I am, dear sir, yours truly,
Lyttelton.

Paul Morphy, Esq.

== Aftermath ==
After returning to New Orleans in 1859, Morphy declared himself retired from the game and, with a few exceptions, gave up public competition for good. Morphy's embryonic law career was disrupted in 1861 by the outbreak of the American Civil War. Possibly because of his opposition to the secession of the Confederacy, Morphy was unable to successfully build a law practice even after the war ended. He became eccentric, reclusive and perhaps mildly insane, and died at the age of 47 from a stroke brought on by entering a cold bath after a long walk in the midday heat.

Staunton continued his twin careers as a chess writer and Shakespearean scholar. The City of London Chess Magazine wrote, "... it is no exaggeration to say that his literary labours are the basis upon which English Chess Society, as at present constituted, stands", and eminent contemporaries including Morphy and Steinitz considered Staunton's writings on chess openings to be among the best of their time. His work as a Shakespearean scholar gained the respect of his contemporaries and of modern writers in that field also. After the end of his competitive chess career he remained an active writer about both chess and Shakespeare until his death, and was at work when he died.

Both players expressed respect for each other's abilities. Morphy said that Staunton had great analytical ability and judgement of positions but his play showed a lack of imagination, and that Staunton may have been the strongest player of his time. In 1860, Staunton published Chess Praxis, which was a supplement to his 1847 work The Chess Player's Handbook. In the new book he devoted 168 pages to presenting many of Morphy's games and praised the play of the American.

== 20th century and recent comments ==
Staunton has been a controversial figure ever since his own time. Reaching an objective assessment is made more difficult by the fact that some well-known chess writers, including Fred Reinfeld, Israel "Al" Horowitz and Reuben Fine, have been criticized by chess historians for their lack of accuracy, both in general and specifically where Staunton is concerned. Edward Winter writes, "It is unwise for the 'non-playing' historian to publish his own analysis, although he may be a useful compiler. Similarly, players who are unversed in, and indifferent to, chess history should not touch it."

Reinfeld, Horowitz and Fine also condemned Staunton's play, but Bobby Fischer praised it highly.

Chess historians Edward Winter and G. H. Diggle trace much of the 20th-century animosity against Staunton to books by Philip W. Sergeant (1872–1952) about Paul Morphy. Sergeant in turn made use of a book by Frederick Edge, who accompanied Morphy to Europe in 1858 as his secretary and personal assistant, but returned to the USA in January 1859, a few months before Morphy. Edge's attitude to Morphy was unusual and complex:

I shall watch over Morphy until he leaves Europe, and when he leaves I can say – "What you are outside of chess, I have made you. Your tremendous laziness, but for me, would have obliterated all your acts. I have taken your hundreds of letters out of your pockets even, and answered them, because you would have made every man your enemy by not replying. I made you stay and play Anderssen, when you wanted to leave. I nursed you when ill, carrying you in my arms like a child. I have been a lover, a brother, a mother to you; I have made you an idol, a god – and now that you are gone, I never – but I will not finish." ... – Burn this letter, Fiske, and forget the contents.

Opinions of Edge's value as a historical source vary widely:

- A review in The Chess Monthly (New York) of The Exploits and Triumphs in Europe, of Paul Morphy ... said, "Mr. Morphy expressly disclaims any connection with it in any way or manner. ... will afford the reader a half-hour's entertainment," and noted the misspelling of some chess masters' names. The historian H. J. R. Murray described Edge's book as "rather ill-natured" and "deals with the Staunton–Morphy episode in a strongly anti-Staunton manner", and Edge himself as "most unreliable of writers" (reviewing Edge's comments about Sarratt, a noted English player and chess writer around 1800–1820). David Hooper, one of the co-authors of The Oxford Companion to Chess , wrote, "Edge also found it profitable to invent baddies (Staunton, Harrwitz). As a consequence Harrwitz lost his job at the Café de la Régence." Hooper's co-author Ken Whyld wrote, "Edge was a proven liar whose book on Morphy ... is often relied upon for unsubstantiated facts."
- David Lawson's book Paul Morphy: The Pride and Sorrow of Chess (New York, 1976) makes extensive use of Edge's book, and points out that, without Edge, there would be very little information about Morphy's activities in Europe, as Morphy was averse to publicity. However Lawson also suggests that Morphy had seen the manuscript of Edge's book, disliked its treatment of the Staunton affair so much that he disavowed it, and objected to Edge's treatment of other matters.
- Although Sergeant used Edge's book as a source, he expressed some reservations: "Edge, though English by birth, was very biased against Staunton; but we can hardly think that his prejudice went so far as to allow him to falsify the evidence"; "Edge, however, is not altogether trustworthy, being bitterly prejudiced against Staunton"; "my own reading of Edge did not lead me to think him a liar; though I cannot deny his anti-Staunton bias".

H. J. R. Murray commented on the whole affair, "In all this there is but little in which we can reproach Staunton, beyond the fact that he kept open the possibility of a match for so long, and even here there is a good deal that could be urged in justification of the course followed by Staunton" but also noted that both sides were playing tactical games with each other in front of the public, and that comments made by both players or their respective supporters were acrimonious.
