= George Lyttelton =

George Lyttelton may be:

- George Lyttelton (MP), member of parliament for Droitwich in 1586
- George Lyttelton, 1st Baron Lyttelton (1709–1773), English politician
- George Lyttelton, 2nd Baron Lyttelton (1763–1828), Anglo-Irish peer and politician
- George Lyttelton, 4th Baron Lyttelton (1817–1876), founder of Canterbury, New Zealand
- George Lyttelton (teacher) (1883–1962), English teacher and littérateur
- George William Spencer Lyttelton (1847–1913), English civil servant and cricketer
