= Handicap (chess) =

Ways to improve winning chances against a stronger player

Position: a8 black rook, b8 black knight, c8 black bishop, d8 black queen, e8 black king, f8 black bishop, g8 black knight, h8 black rook, a7 black pawn, b7 black pawn, c7 black pawn, d7 black pawn, e7 black pawn, g7 black pawn, h7 black pawn, a2 white pawn, b2 white pawn, c2 white pawn, d2 white pawn, e2 white pawn, f2 white pawn, g2 white pawn, h2 white pawn, a1 white rook, b1 white knight, c1 white bishop, d1 white queen, e1 white king, f1 white bishop, g1 white knight, h1 white rook

Initial setup for pawn and move: Black starts without the f-pawn; the weaker player (White) moves first.

Position: b8 black rook, c8 black bishop, d8 black queen, e8 black king, f8 black bishop, g8 black knight, h8 black rook, a7 black pawn, b7 black pawn, c7 black pawn, d7 black pawn, e7 black pawn, f7 black pawn, g7 black pawn, h7 black pawn, a2 white pawn, b2 white pawn, c2 white pawn, d2 white pawn, e2 white pawn, f2 white pawn, g2 white pawn, h2 white pawn, b1 white knight, c1 white bishop, d1 white queen, e1 white king, f1 white bishop, g1 white knight, h1 white rook

Initial setup for queen rook in exchange for the opponent's queen knight: White starts without the a-rook; Black, on the other hand, removes their b8-knight and moves their queen rook to b8. The stronger player (White) moves first.

Handicaps (or odds) in chess are setup or rule modifications which enable a weaker player to have a higher chance of winning against a stronger one. There are a variety of such handicaps, such as material odds (the stronger player surrenders a certain piece or pieces), extra moves (the weaker player has an agreed number of moves at the beginning of the game), extra time on the chess clock, and special conditions (such as requiring the odds-giver to deliver checkmate with a specified piece or pawn). Various permutations of these, such as pawn and two moves, are also possible.

Handicaps were quite popular in the 18th and 19th centuries, when chess was often played for money stakes, in order to induce weaker players to play for wagers. Today handicaps are rarely seen in serious competition outside of human–computer chess matches. As chess engines have been routinely superior to even chess masters since the late 20th century, human players need considerable odds to have practical chances in such matches – as of 2025, approximately knight odds for strong grandmasters.

== History ==
According to Harry Golombek, "Odds-giving reached its heyday in the eighteenth century and the early nineteenth century." Indeed, it was so prevalent in the 18th century that Philidor (1726–1795) played the vast majority of his games at odds. About fifteen percent of the known games of Paul Morphy (1837–1884) are games in which he gave odds. Other strong odds-givers of this time were George Henry Mackenzie (1837–1891) and Wilhelm Steinitz (1836–1900).

Howard Staunton in The Chess-Player's Handbook (1847) advised inexperienced players to accept odds offered by superior players and, upon improving to the point that they can themselves give odds to some players, to avoid playing such players on even terms, warning that doing so is apt to induce "an indolent, neglectful habit of play". In 1849, Staunton published The Chess-Player's Companion, a 510-page work "chiefly directed to the exposition of openings where one party gives odds". Just over 300 pages were devoted to odds games: Book I (pages 1 to 185) contained games played at various odds, and most of Book V (pages 380–496) discussed various types of odds, including exotic and unusual ones. The late-19th century chess opening treatise Chess Openings Ancient and Modern, by Edward Freeborough and Charles Ranken, included fourteen pages of analysis of best play in games played at odds of pawn and move, pawn and two moves, and either knight.

Macon Shibut writes that in the mid-19th century "chess was a gambling game ... . Individual matches for stakes were the focus of organized play. Matches between leading players attracted a wide following so masters often succeeded in finding sponsors to back their personal wagers." The available sums were generally relatively meager, however, and travel was arduous, so the amount of money obtained in this way was not sufficient to enable professional chess players to support themselves financially. Moreover, the first major chess tournament was not organized until 1851, and chess tournaments remained a rarity for several decades following. With tournaments an unreliable means of making a living, odds-giving became a way for masters to entice amateurs into playing for wagers, since the odds gave the amateur a fighting chance. The odds system even became the earliest rating system: amateurs were graded according to what handicap they needed to compete against a master, and were referred to as a "Rook player" or "Pawn and move player", for example, as many people would today speak of players by their Elo ratings (e.g. a "1200 player" or an "1800 player").

The playing of games at odds gradually grew rarer as the nineteenth century proceeded. Today, except for time odds, they have all but disappeared. Shibut posits that games played at material odds became unpopular for (1) technological, (2) political, and (3) philosophical reasons. Taking these in turn, first, the introduction of chess clocks gave rise to a new way to give odds, one that has today supplanted material odds as the preferred mode of odds-giving. Second, the Soviet Union supported chess masters and sponsored chess education, but expected chess masters "to be cultural icons, not hustlers". Third, chess began to be treated in a scientific, logical way, "with an assumption of idealized 'best play' [coming] to underpin all analysis". From this perspective, a game beginning from a "lost" position becomes less interesting, even distasteful. Writings by Wilhelm Steinitz (1836–1900), the first World Champion, and James Mason (1849–1905) are consistent with the last point. GM Larry Kaufman argued in 2024 that another factor was that chess became more popular and the standard of play rose, so that it was no longer reasonable to give piece odds to strong players.

World Chess Champion Bobby Fischer often gave odds, as did IM Israel Albert Horowitz before him. Against FIDE Master Asa Hoffmann, Fischer first gave pawn and move (f7), then pawn and two moves, and then pawn and three moves. In an interview with Ralph Ginzburg published in the January 1962 issue of Harper's Magazine, Bobby Fischer was quoted as saying that women were weak chessplayers and that he could successfully give knight odds to any woman in the world. Fischer later claimed that Ginzburg had distorted what he had said.

In 2001, London businessman Terence Chapman, a master-level player, played a match against former world champion Garry Kasparov, with Kasparov giving odds of two pawns in each game (the pawns removed were different each time); Kasparov won the match by two games to one, with one draw.

Rybka, a top-rated computer chess engine designed by International Master Vasik Rajlich, played a series of handicap matches against strong human players. In March 2007, Rybka defeated Grandmaster (GM) Jaan Ehlvest after giving pawn odds (removing a different pawn each time). In January 2008, Rybka defeated GM Joel Benjamin after giving draw odds. In March 2008, Rybka gave pawn and move (removing a different pawn each time) to GM Roman Dzindzichashvili, drawing the match 4–4. In June 2008, Rybka gave knight odds to FIDE Master John Meyer, losing 4–0. On July 6, 2008, Rybka gave Meyer odds of pawn and three moves, winning 3–1. In 2015, Komodo (co-authored by Don Dailey and Larry Kaufman) defeated strong grandmasters at the f7-pawn handicap and rook (a1) for knight (b8), without losing a single game.

Position: a8 black rook, c8 black bishop, d8 black queen, e8 black king, f8 black bishop, h8 black rook, a7 black pawn, b7 black pawn, c7 black pawn, d7 black pawn, e7 black pawn, f7 black pawn, g7 black pawn, h7 black pawn, a2 white pawn, b2 white pawn, c2 white pawn, d2 white pawn, e2 white pawn, f2 white pawn, g2 white pawn, h2 white pawn, a1 white knight, b1 white knight, c1 white knight, d1 white knight, e1 white king, f1 white knight, g1 white knight, h1 white knight

Initial setup for the "Knightmare" position. White has all knights, while Black has no knights.

Top human players still occasionally play odds matches against engines. In 2016, Komodo played Hikaru Nakamura in four odds games, giving pawn & move odds, pawn odds, exchange odds, and 4-move odds. The first three ended drawn, while Komodo won the last game to win the match 2½–1½. In 2018, Komodo played another handicap series against Maxime Vachier-Lagrave. Komodo won four games at pawn and two moves odds, two-pawn odds, queen for rook + queen's knight odds, and knight for f7-pawn odds. Maxime Vachier-Lagrave won at odds of exchange and pawn for knight, while the last "Knightmare" game (diagram) was drawn. Finally, in 2020, Komodo played a 6-game match against GM David Smerdon at knight odds. GM Smerdon blundered away the first game, but rallied to win the remaining five.

From 9 November 2023, Leela Chess Zero supports playing at knight odds (b1 or g1) on Lichess. Against "par" grandmasters (Elo around 2500), the bot scored +24−5=2. Kaufman suggests that "only an 'elite' grandmaster could win a rapid match from LeelaKnightOdds". Later, queen for knight odds (LeelaQueenForKnight) and queen odds (LeelaQueenOdds) were also added, along with the option to play as either colour (i.e. knight and move, queen for knight and move, and queen and move) Rook odds were added on 29 February 2024, with the choice of rook (a-file or h-file) and colour.

The first version of LeelaKnightOdds played a ten-game knight odds blitz match against GM David Navara on 30 March 2024, alternating between the b1 and g1 knights: the first two games were at 5+3, the next four at 3+2, the next two at 3+1, and the last two at 3+2 again. Navara won 7–3 (+6−2=2). After upgrades to use a specialised network for chess handicaps, LeelaKnightOdds played a match (first to six wins) against GM Awonder Liang on 12 December 2024, alternating between the b1 and g1 knights. Liang scored +1−6=7, going +0−6=4 among the 3+2 games.

On 29 November 2025, a classical event was held matching 19 strong human players in Jerusalem against the Leela odds bots. LeelaRookOdds achieved a performance rating of 2321, comparable to that of a human FIDE Master (noting that it was playing without the a1-rook). The games in which humans won required accuracy of at least 97%, so that winning a game with rook odds tends to require close to perfection: otherwise, the disadvantage tends to gradually reduce until the human makes a serious error, making the game close to a draw, and then later errors drift it to a loss.

Kaufman argues that odds chess is excellent for training. He argues that if a master plays a weaker student for training, then the following options are available, and he finds the last one preferable:

- The master can point out and take back the student's errors, but then that amounts to playing a game against oneself instead of against the student;
- the master can deliberately make blunders, but then that defeats the purpose of allowing the student to play against a master;
- or the master can offer a fair handicap, allowing the student to tangibly feel progress while advancing to lesser and lesser handicaps. In Kaufman's experience, there is always some handicap available that will equalise any given difference in strength.

== Handicaps ==
The purpose of a handicap, or odds, is to compensate for the difference in skill between two chess players. There are a variety of handicaps: material odds; extra moves; time odds; special restrictions (such as pion coiffé); weighting of results (such as draw odds – counting a draw as a loss for the odds-giver); differential stakes; and physical restrictions, such as blindfold chess. Many different permutations of handicaps (for example, a material handicap plus time odds) are also possible, as are countervailing handicaps (for example, a player gives up a piece, but receives one of the opponent's pieces or pawns and/or extra moves, in return).

=== Main ===
The following list is based on that of Larry Kaufman, mostly describing the 19th-century situation.

- Draw odds (possibly two steps, depending on which colour the stronger player plays);
- Pawn (f2) – quite rare, since time odds could substitute;
  - When a single pawn is removed, it is always the f-pawn. This is because removing any other pawn gives some compensation in the form of opening a file or diagonal for a rook, bishop, or queen.
- Pawn (f7) and move;
  - This is a much larger handicap than f2-pawn odds, because after 1.e4 (clearly the best move), the threat of 2.Qh5+ means that Black has few options: 1...e5 loses immediately, 1...c5 and 1...d5 are gambits (Black loses the pawn to the check, though there is some compensation), 1...c6 fails because 2.Nc3 prevents 2...d5, and 1...g6 and 1...d6 (the latter with the idea of g6 later) are very risky because of the plan h2–h4–h5. The best options are probably 1...e6 and 1...Nc6; 1...Nh6 2.d4 Nf7 is also possible but loses time. Therefore, pawn and move is more like a 1.5-pawn handicap, though it demands that both players have specialised opening knowledge.
  - Staunton sometimes substituted rook (a1) for knight (b8) (also known as exchange odds), which is similar in degree but demands less specialised knowledge than pawn and move. Exchange and move (a8 for usually b1) was also occasionally given historically. Exchange odds were never historically popular, however, because of differing values of pieces across the game: the knight is more useful than the rook in the opening, but the handicap becomes felt when pieces are traded to give an endgame, where being up rook for knight is almost always decisive. Kaufman writes that rook for knight is a larger handicap than f-pawn if the stronger player has the same colours in both, but that pawn and move is more severe than a1 for b8. Play is different in both: f-pawn handicaps necessitate defensive play and attempting to reach an endgame, whereas exchange handicaps necessitate attacking play.
- Pawn and two moves (usually 1.e4 and then White to move again);
  - Almost always, 1.e4 2.d4 was played. However, Kaufman notes that 1.e4 2.Nc3! is stronger, as the otherwise desirable move 2...e6 loses a second pawn (3.Qh5+ g6 4.Qe5 Nf6 5.Nd5! Kf7 6.Qxc7). This can be avoided by 2...d6 (with the idea of 3...e6) or 2...Nh6 (with the idea of 3...Nf7), but in either case Black lacks counterplay against White's advantages in material, king safety, space, and development.
  - Two pawns (usually c2 and f2) is an alternative, comparable to but slightly less than pawn and two moves. It was used by Komodo Dragon against Nakamura.
- Pawn and three moves (usually 1.e4 2.d4 and then White to move again);
  - It is forbidden to cross the fourth rank, because 1.e3 2.Bd3 3.Qh5+ g6 4.Qxg6+ hxg6 5.Bxg6# would win immediately. Asa Hoffmann played 1.e3 2.Bd3 3.Qg4 against Fischer at these odds, forcing the win of a second pawn, but Kaufman suggests that 1.e4 2.d4 3.Bd3 or 1.e4 2.d4 3.Nc3 are better.
  - Historically, opinions differed on how many moves at pawn handicap were valid thresholds before reaching the knight handicap. Pawn and three moves was often considered to be too close to the knight handicap historically, but Staunton, Morphy, and Fischer all used it as an intermediate step between pawn and two moves and knight odds. Fischer sometimes even gave pawn and four moves. Test games from modern engines show that pawn and three moves is useful, being about midway between pawn and two moves and knight odds; on the other hand, pawn and four moves is approximately as big a handicap as knight odds, making it not very useful as knight odds gives a more normal game.
  - A comparable handicap is two black pawns (c7 and f7), which Kaufman recommends to substitute pawn and three moves as producing more normal play.
  - Philidor used instead knight for second move: White plays 1.e4 and gets to move again, but gives up a knight (with the choice between b1 and g1). Staunton also thought favourably of this handicap, as does Kaufman.
- Knight (more often b1 than g1);
  - Before 1870, it was more common to give the b1-knight; after 1870, the g1-knight handicap becomes more common. In particular, Horowitz always gave the g1-knight. In both human and engine play, it is somewhat easier to give the g1-knight. This is because without the b1-knight, 1.e4 is a bad move that is best answered by 1...d5!, because after 2.exd5 Qxd5 there is no knight to chase the queen away. The Queen's Gambit (playing d4 and c4 in the first few moves) also does not work well when no knight can come to c3, so that 1.f4, 1.b3 (or 1.Nf3 then b3), or the London System become White's best options. On the other hand, 1.e4 and the Queen's Gambit both work well without the g1-knight, though Kaufman suggests that the Jobava London (1.d4 d5 2.Nc3 Nf6 3.Bf4) is even better since the plan with 0-0-0, f3, and g4 with a kingside attack does not need the g1-knight.
  - Morphy used an extra step on the handicap ladder, ranking b1-knight odds with the restriction that Black must meet 1.e4 with 1...e5 as one step lower than unrestricted b1-knight odds. But even with this restriction, best play for Black is 1.e4 e5 2.Nf3 d5!
  - The bishop handicap was hardly ever used historically (only one game exists), because the bishops (unlike the knights) are not interchangeable: the player with a missing bishop is incentivised to place friendly pawns on the opposite colour of the remaining bishop. Thus it gives a less normal game than a knight handicap. (Nonetheless, in modern times Daniel Naroditsky has played some games at bishop odds versus a computer.)
  - The knight handicap has recently been used in many matches between engines and GMs, with the knight given up alternating between games. In April 2020, GM David Smerdon won 5–1 against Komodo (15+10); in July 2021, GM Anthony Wirig won 6–3 against Komodo Dragon (15+10); in January 2022, GM Eugene Perelshteyn and GM Ben Finegold both won 4–2 against Komodo Dragon (15+10); and in March 2023, GM David Navara won 7–3 against LeelaKnightOdds (5+3 for the first two games, 3+2 for the next four, 3+1 for the next two, and 3+2 again for the last two).
- Knight and move (more often b8 than g8);
  - This was rare historically. Black cannot create counterplay or force opposite-side castling as easily as White, so that the move is a significant advantage.
- Rook (a1);
  - Historically, the a1-rook is always the one given up, so that the more common kingside castling is still possible.
  - Sometimes castling queenside was allowed without the a1-rook (moving only the king), but Staunton argued that it should not. No consensus was reached on the issue during the heyday of odds-giving. Kaufman suggests not allowing this option in the modern age, because databases and servers do not allow it.
  - Some players added an extra step before rook odds, with the a-pawn already moved to a3 so that it is protected. However, Morphy and Staunton did not make use of this variant.
- Rook and move (a8);
- and then the whole cycle could be repeated with an extra rook, with queen odds substituting two rooks. (According to Kaufman, queen odds is probably a slightly larger handicap than two rooks. As of 2025, this is not borne out with Leela, though currently it does not have a specialized net for two rooks odds.)

Position: a8 black rook, b8 black knight, c8 black bishop, d8 black queen, e8 black king, f8 black bishop, g8 black knight, h8 black rook, a7 black pawn, b7 black pawn, c7 black pawn, d7 black pawn, e7 black pawn, f7 black pawn, g7 black pawn, h7 black pawn, a4 white pawn, c4 white knight, d4 white pawn, e4 white knight, f4 white queen, h4 white pawn, e3 white rook, f3 white rook, g3 white pawn, h3 white bishop, b2 white pawn, c2 white pawn, e2 white pawn, f2 white pawn, c1 white bishop, e1 white king

Black to move. White mates in two moves regardless of what Black plays.

Even with the "no moves beyond the fourth rank" proviso, Black cannot give White an unlimited number of moves. Doing so would allow White to set up the position at right, when White's dual threats of 1.Qxf7# and 1.Ned6+ cxd6 2.Nxd6# are immediately decisive. Kaufman also points out that pawn and four moves is already problematic due to 1.e3 2.Bd3 3.Qg4 4.Nc3, and now Black is forced to give up the e-pawn and trade queens.

For the modern era, Kaufman advocates the following list:

Handicap	Eval	Notes
Odds of the move	0.17	
Two moves (1.e4 and White to move again)	0.48	White is better, but objectively this is not a winning advantage. However, three moves (1.e4 2.d4 and White to move again) would be.
Pawn (remove f2)	0.71	
Pawn and move (remove f7)	1.20	
Pawn and two moves (remove f7, 1.e4 and White to move again)	1.59	
Two pawns and move (remove c7 and f7)	2.03	To replace the historically unpopular pawn and three moves; odds of two pawns gives a more normal game.
Knight for second move (remove either b1 or g1, 1.e4 and White to move again)	2.44	
Knight (remove b1 or g1)	2.81	For a match, alternate the knight removed. Kaufman calls this "the critical handicap between engines and grandmasters", and notes that it is also useful and important between good players. It is a smaller handicap to give the g1-knight.
Knight and move (remove b8 or g8)	3.28	Historically rare, but fills the large gap between knight and rook odds.
Rook (remove a1)	3.70	0-0-0 is not allowed; the a-pawn starts on a2.
Rook and move (remove a8)	4.07	
Rook and pawn (remove a1 and f2)	4.48	
Queen for knight (remove d1 and b8)	5.21	Replaces Morphy's preferred and comparable rook, pawn, and move (remove a8 and f7), as this produces a more normal game.
Queen for knight and move (remove d8 and b1)	5.48	Replaces Morphy's preferred and comparable rook, pawn, and two moves (remove a8 and f7, 1.e4 and White to move again), as this produces a more normal game.
Two knights (remove b1 and g1)	5.64	
Two knights and move (remove b8 and g8)	5.84	
Rook and knight (remove a1 and b1)	6.59	
Rook, knight, and move (remove a8 and b8)	6.76	
Rook, knight, and pawn (remove a1, b1, and f2)	7.33	
Rook, knight, pawn, and move (remove a8, b8, and f7)	7.56	
Queen (remove d1)	7.95	
Queen and move (remove d8)	8.20	
Queen and pawn (remove d1 and f2)	8.80	
Queen, pawn, and move (remove d8 and f7)	9.08	
Queen, pawn, and two moves (remove d8 and f7, 1.e4 and White to move again)	9.44	

Kaufman notes that the standard piece values (knight = bishop = 3, rook = 5, queen = 9) are valid for the endgame and are misleading about the initial position of odds. He gives the following table, normalized to f-pawn odds being 1:

Handicap	Value
f-pawn	1
Knight	~3.0
Bishop	~3.5
Rook	~4.0 or a bit more
Queen	~8.0

Rook odds is closer to knight odds than two knights odds, and queen for knight odds is about half a pawn smaller than two knights odds.

Kaufman mentions even greater handicaps, such as queen and knight; queen and two knights; and queen and two rooks.

Leela Chess Zero supports the following odds, with both colours:

- Knight;
- Rook;
- Queen for knight;
- Two knights;
- Two bishops;
- Rook and knight;
- Two rooks;
- Queen;
- Two bishops and knight;
- Rook and two knights;
- Rook and two bishops;
- Queen and knight;
- Two bishops and two knights;
- Queen and rook;
- Queen and two knights;
- Queen and two bishops;
- Queen, rook, and knight;
- Queen and two rooks.

=== Others ===
Some other rarer material odds are mentioned by Harry Golombek:

- Two minor pieces: The odds-giver chooses which of their two knights and/or bishops to remove.
- Two rooks: Both rooks of the stronger player are removed.
- Queen and rook: The stronger player's queen and queen rook are removed.
- Queenside odds: All queenside pieces (not pawns) of the stronger player are removed.

I.A. Horowitz also notes:

- Draw odds: The smallest of these handicaps; the stronger player plays White, and draws are counted as wins for Black.
- Queen for a rook: A handicap between knight odds and rook odds; the odds-giver's queen, and the odds-receiver's queen rook, are removed.

Time handicaps are most often practised in blitz games. The stronger player may be given one or two minutes to play the whole game, while the weaker player receives five minutes or more. Money odds are another way of compensating for a difference in strength; the stronger player puts up some multiple (three, five, ten, etc.) of the amount of money put up by the weaker player.

In the 16th–19th centuries pion coiffé (capped or marked pawn) handicapping was sometimes used. The stronger player must checkmate with a particular pawn, which is usually marked at the start of play. The pawn cannot be promoted; giving checkmate with any other pawn or piece loses the game. Pion coiffé is considered to be about equivalent to giving odds of a queen. Similarly, games have occasionally been played with a ringed piece, where a ring or band is placed around a particular piece, and the player giving odds must checkmate with that piece. This form of odds, along with pion coiffé, are very difficult for the odds-giver, who cannot allow the odds-receiver to sacrifice for the capped or ringed piece or pawn. For instance, in pion coiffé, after 1.e4 d5 2.exd5 Qxd5, Black already threatens to sacrifice the queen for the capped pawn if it is the a-, d-, or g-pawn, to play 3...Qe5+ followed by such a sacrifice if it is the b- or h-pawn, or to play 3...Qe4+ followed by a sacrifice if it is the c-pawn.

- Strong king: The weaker player's king may move up to two squares in any direction in a straight line. Considered greater than queenside odds by Golombek.
- Checkmate on a particular square: This may mean either that the odds-receiver's king must be mated while on the specified square, or that the odds-giver's piece must administer mate from that square. Carrera considered the first of these roughly equivalent to knight odds, the second a bit less. Assiac observed of the first, "This sounds like a formidable proposition, but it really isn't. All the better player has to do is reduce the game to a favorable ending. Thereafter, having promoted a pawn or two, he will find the rest easy."
- Checkmate with a pawn: The mating pawn may be any pawn, not a specified pawn, as in pion coiffé. Carrera considered this form of odds equivalent to giving odds of two pawns.
- Giving all the pieces for two moves each time: The odds-giver begins the game with only the king and pawns, while the odds-receiver has a full complement of pieces and pawns. In exchange for this, the odds-giver plays two moves on each turn, while the odds-receiver can only play one. Carrera wrote that while some considered this an even game, he thought that it favored the pieces, although the side with the pieces must play cautiously. The player with the pieces should try to eliminate the pawns, for instance by giving up two pawns for one, or a minor piece for two pawns. This is also called Monster chess (which usually uses four pawns).
- Giving the king the knight's move: The odds-receiver's king, in addition to being able to move in the usual manner, is able to move like a knight. Carrera considered this form of odds improper because it allows the odds-receiver to use their king to checkmate the enemy king from a knight's move away (for example, with the odds-receiver's king at g6 and the odds-giver's king at h8, the latter is in check and, if no legal response is possible, is checkmated). Carrera considered this form of odds equivalent to giving rook and pawn odds. Because of the king's unusual power, the odds-giver requires more material than usual in order to checkmate a bare king (for example, queen and another piece, or two rooks).
- Giving the queen the knight's move: Similarly to the above, the odds-receiver's queen (rather than king) has the additional ability to move like a knight. This makes the queen very powerful, since she has the ability to administer mate without the assistance of any other pieces (for instance, an enhanced queen on h6 mates a king on h8, since Kg8 would still leave the king in check). Carrera considered this roughly equivalent to knight odds, although it varied depending on the players' strengths.
- Odds of the castled king: The odds-receiver begins the game with the positions of their king and one of their rooks interchanged (e.g., king on h8 or a8, and the displaced rook on the king's square). The first way (king on h8, rook on e8) is used unless otherwise specified before the game. Carrera thought this form of odds equivalent to the player with normally placed pieces giving a little less than two pawns, or a little less than a knight if the a8-rook and king are the ones interchanged. Staunton noted that Carrera's description and examples of these odds "are not adapted to our mode of castling" since the king and rook do not end up on the same squares they would normally occupy after castling.

Staunton also mentioned the following unusual forms of odds not discussed by Carrera:

- Odds of the losing game: The odds-giver undertakes to force the odds-receiver to checkmate him. (See Paris–Marseille, correspondence 1878, given below.)
- Additional pawns: The odds-giver permits the odds-receiver to begin the game with a specified number of extra pawns (for example, eight extra pawns). Unless specially agreed, the side with the extra pawns moves first.
- Odds of queen rook in exchange for the opponent's queen knight, or pawn and move, or pawn and two moves.
- Odds of queen knight in exchange for pawn and move, or in exchange for the first two moves.

== Opening theory ==
Kaufman provides the following lines of pawn and move opening theory, analysed using Leela Chess Zero. He only considers 1.e4, noting that it is "clearly the best move" in this handicap.

French Defence

1. e4 e6 2. d4 An alternative is 2.Nc3, which prevents the French due to Qh5+ after the trade. In the case of 2...Bb4 3.Qh5+ g6 4.Qe5 Nf6 5.Nd5 0-0 6.Nxf6+ Qxf6 7.Qxf6 Rxf6 8.c3 Be7 9.d4, White has traded queens, kept the pawn advantage, and secured central control. Black could also enter a Taimanov Sicilian with 2...c5 3.Nf3 Nc6 4.d4 cxd4 5.Nxd4 Qc7 6.Be3 a6 7.f4, where the missing f-pawn necessitates some unnatural development on Black's part. 2... d5 3. Nc3 Also possible is the Tarrasch Variation: 3.Nd2 c5 4.exd5 exd5 5.Bb5+ Bd7 6.Qh5+ g6 7.Bxd7+ Qxd7 8.Qe5+ Qe7 9.Qxe7+ Bxe7 10.dxc5 Bxc5 11.Ngf3 Nf6 12.0-0 0-0 13.Nb3 Bb6 14.Re1 produces a normal Tarrasch endgame against a Black isolated queen pawn, but where White is up a pawn. 3... Bb4 4. exd5 exd5 5. Qh5+ g6 6. Qe5+ Qe7 7. Bf4 Nc6 8. Qxe7+ Ngxe7 9. Bxc7 0-0 Also possible is 9...Nxd4 10.0-0-0 Bxc3 11.bxc3 Ndc6 12.Nf3, conceding the bishop pair: White is better developed. 10. Nge2 Be6 11. a3 Rac8 12. Bg3 White is securely up two pawns.

Nimzowitsch Defence

1. e4 Nc6 2. d4 e5 3. dxe5 Nxe5 4. Nf3 Nxf3+ An alternative is 4...Qf6 5.Nc3 Bb4 6.Bd2 Nxf3+ 7.Qxf3 Qxf3 8.gxf3 Ne7 9.0-0-0, where White has advantages in material, space, and development. 5. Qxf3 Bd6 6. Nc3 Nf6 7. Bf4 Bxf4 8. Qxf4 d6 9. Bc4 Bd7 10. 0-0-0 Qe7 11. Rhe1 0-0-0 12. e5 dxe5 13. Rxe5 Qf8 14. f3 White has a large advantage in development and has kept the extra pawn.

1. e4 Nc6 2. d4 d5 3. e5 This is good because the normal undermining move ...f6 is not available. 3... Bf5 4. c3 e6 5. Ne2 g5 6. Ng3 Bg6 7. Be2 In addition to spatial and material advantages, White has secured control over the important square h5.

Philidor Defence

1. e4 d6 2. d4 Nf6 3. Nc3 e5 4. Nf3 Nc6 5. h3 Be7 6. Bc4 Na5 7. Bb5+ Bd7 8. dxe5 dxe5 9. Bxd7+ Qxd7 10. Qxd7+ Nxd7 11. Nd5 Bd6 12. Ke2 0-0-0 13. Rd1 In addition to the initial material advantage, White has the good bishop, a strongly positioned knight on the outpost d5, and a better positioned king for the endgame.

Pirc Defence

1. e4 d6 2. d4 Nf6 3. Nc3 e6 4. Nf3 Be7 5. Bb5+ c6 6. Bd3 0-0 7. 0-0 Na6 8. a3 White has developed better and secured central control, in addition to the extra pawn.

Sicilian Defence

1. e4 c5 A gambit once played by Alexander Alekhine, but Black has very little compensation for being two pawns down after 2. Qh5+ g6 3. Qxc5 e6 4. Qe3 Bh6 5. Qa3.

Adams Defence

1. e4 Nh6 Intending to post the knight on f7, the best square possible. 2. d4 Nf7 3. Be3 e6 4. a3 Be7 5. Nc3 0-0 6. Bd3 d6 7. f4 Nd7 8. Nf3 c5 9. Qe2 cxd4 10. Nxd4 Nb6 11. 0-0 e5 12. fxe5 Nxe5 13. Rxf8+ Bxf8 14. h3 White has a large advantage in development and has kept the extra pawn.

== Rating equivalent ==
In 2008, Kaufman wrote the following about the Elo rating equivalence of giving knight odds:

[T]he Elo equivalent of a given handicap degrades as you go down the scale. A knight seems to be worth around a thousand points when the "weak" player is around IM level, but it drops as you go down. For example, I'm about 2400 and I've played tons of knight odds games with students, and I would put the break-even point (for untimed but reasonably quick games) with me at around 1800, so maybe a 600 value at this level. An 1800 can probably give knight odds to a 1400, a 1400 to an 1100, an 1100 to a 900, etc. This is pretty obviously the way it must work, because the weaker the players are, the more likely the weaker one is to blunder a piece or more. When you get down to the level of the average 8 year old player, knight odds is just a slight edge, maybe 50 points or so.

Kaufman has written that Kasparov could give pawn and move odds to a weak grandmaster (2500 FIDE rating) and be slightly favored, and would have even chances at knight odds against a player with a FIDE rating of 2115.

In 2024, Kaufman provided a more detailed table, giving rating equivalents for a fair game (based on Chess.com ratings at 10+10 rapid; classical ratings would be 200 points higher, and blitz 3+2 or 5+0 ratings would be 200 points lower). He wrote that players below 1600 or above 2000 should "look for the same Elo difference" between opponents in the table. Ratings above 2900 (italicised below) would only apply for engines; perfect play for engines is expected to be 4000.

1600	1800	2000	Odds	1600	1800	2000
gives odds to...			Odds	receives odds from...		
1582	1780	1974	Odds of the move	1618	1821	2027
1551	1741	1928	Two moves (1.e4 and White to move again)	1652	1863	2078
1528	1713	1895	Pawn (f2)	1677	1895	2117
1481	1657	1829	Pawn (f7) and move	1734	1966	2206
1446	1615	1779	Pawn (f7) and two moves (1.e4 and White to move again)	1782	2027	2282
1407	1569	1725	Two pawns (c7 and f7)	1838	2099	2382
1372	1528	1678	Knight for second move (White starts without a knight, but starts 1.e4 and then moves again)	1895	2172	2474
1341	1493	1637	Knight (either)	1949	2242	2570
1304	1449	1587	Knight (either) and move	2019	2339	2705
1271	1411	1544	Rook (a1)	2088	2435	2846
1243	1380	1508	Rook (a8) and move	2153	2525	2987
1214	1347	1470	Rook (a1) and pawn (f2)	2229	2640	3167
1163	1288	1404	Queen (d1) for knight (b8)	2382	2878	3604
1144	1268	1381	Queen (d8) for knight (b1) and move	2445	2980	3833
1134	1255	1368	Two knights (b1 and g1)	2484	3048	4000
1120	1240	1351	Two knights (b8 and g8) and move	2535	3136	
1072	1188	1291	Rook (a1) and knight (b1)	2755	3573	
1062	1175	1278	Rook (a8), knight (b8), and move	2811	3705	
1027	1136	1236	Rook (a1), knight (b1), and pawn (f2)	3028		
1013	1121	1219	Rook (a8), knight (b8), pawn (f7), and move	3132		
991	1096	1191	Queen (d1)	3333		
976	1080	1174	Queen (d8) and move	3488		
943	1042	1133	Queen (d1) and pawn (f2)	4000		
928	1026	1115	Queen (d8), pawn (f7), and move			
908	1005	1092	Queen (d8), pawn (f7), and two moves (1.e4 and White to move again)			

Kaufman also gave the following ratings and handicaps to equalise chances against Magnus Carlsen (whose rating was rounded to Elo 2900) in rapid (10+10):

Odds	Elo
None	2900
Pawn (f2)	2600
Pawn (f7) and move	2500
Pawn (f7) and two moves	2400
Knight (especially g1)	2200
Rook (a1)	2000
Queen (d1) for knight (b8)	1800
Rook (a1) and knight (b1)	1600
Queen (d8) and move	1400
Queen (d1) and knight (b1)	1200
Queen (d1) and two knights (b1 and g1)	1000

The faster the time limit, the larger the handicap needed at the same rating difference. Kaufman writes that the necessary handicap for a 3-minute blitz game is about double the necessary handicap for a slow classical game, assuming the same players in each.

In December 2025, based on the match in Jerusalem between Leela and human players, Kaufman wrote that at classical time limits, Leela at rook odds is on par with an IM (FIDE rating 2400), and Leela at knight odds is on par with a strong GM (FIDE rating 2600). If the time control is reduced to fast classical, or Fischer random chess is used, then the rating for a strong human to remain competitive increases by 100.

== Illustrative games ==
=== Pawn and move ===
This game was won by Siegbert Tarrasch, whom Assiac described as "one of the greatest experts of 'Pawn and move' theory":

Eckart vs. Tarrasch, 1887–88

Position: g8 black knight, h8 black rook, a7 black pawn, g7 black pawn, h7 black pawn, b6 black king, c6 white bishop, c5 black bishop, d4 black rook, f4 black pawn, g4 black bishop, h4 black queen, d3 white queen, a2 white pawn, b2 white pawn, c2 white pawn, g2 white pawn, h2 white pawn, a1 white rook, b1 white knight, c1 white bishop, f1 white king, h1 white rook

Position after 13...Rxd4

Position: g8 black knight, h8 black rook, a7 black pawn, b7 white queen, g7 black pawn, h7 black pawn, c6 white bishop, d6 black king, c5 black bishop, d4 black rook, f4 black pawn, g4 black bishop, h4 black queen, c3 white knight, a2 white pawn, b2 white pawn, c2 white pawn, g2 white pawn, h2 white pawn, a1 white rook, c1 white bishop, f1 white king, h1 white rook

Position after 16.Nc3

K. Eckart vs. Tarrasch, Nuremberg Chess Club Championship 1887–88 (remove Black's f-pawn)
1. e4 Nc6 2. f4 e5 3. Nf3 exf4 4. Bc4 Bc5 Planning the following unsound but tricky sacrifice. 5. d4 Nxd4?! 6. Nxd4 Qh4+ 7. Kf1 d5 Sacrificing another pawn for rapid development. 8. exd5 Bg4 9. Bb5+? Evidently overlooking Black's next move. Correct was 9.Qd3, with a satisfactory defense. c6! 10. dxc6 0-0-0! 11. cxb7+ Kxb7 12. Bc6+ Kb6 13. Qd3 Rxd4 Black has regained the sacrificed piece and, contrary to appearances, his king is quite safe. 14. Qb5+ Kc7 15. Qb7+ Kd6 16. Nc3 Allowing a pretty finish, but 16.Bf3 Rd1+! 17.Ke2 (17.Bxd1 Qf2#) Bxf3+ 18.Qxf3 Rxh1 also wins for Black. Qf2+! 17. Kxf2 Rd1+ (discovered check) 18. Be3 Bxe3# 0–1 Notes based on those by Fred Reinfeld.

=== Pawn and two moves ===
Daniel Harrwitz vs. Howard Staunton, 1846 (remove Black's f-pawn)
1. e4 2. d4 2.Nc3 is better. e6 3. c4 3.Nc3! is better: 3...Bb4 4.Bd3 Nc6 5.e5 Qe7 6.Nf3 d5 7.0-0 gives White better development, a spatial advantage, and better king safety (Black will probably be unable to safely castle on either wing) in addition to his extra pawn. c5 4. d5 d6 5. f4 g6 6. Nf3 Bg7 7. Nc3 Ne7 8. Bd3 Na6 9. 0-0 0-0 10. h3 Nc7 11. Qc2?! 11.a4! is better. a6?! Better was 11...b5! 12.dxe6 bxc4 13.Bxc4 Bxe6, where although Black is still lost, he has more play than he would typically have at pawn and two moves handicap. 12. a4 Bd7 13. Be3 Rc8 14. Rad1 Better is 14.a5! exd5 15.cxd5 Nb5 16.Qb3 with decisive advantage to White. exd5 15. cxd5 Ne8 16. b3 Qa5 17. Ne2 b5 18. axb5 axb5 19. Rc1 Qa3 20. Nd2 20.Bf2! gives a decisive advantage. Qa5 21. Bf2 Nc7 22. Bh4 Rf7?! 22...Rce8 is a bit better. 23. Bxe7? A blunder, conceding the bishop pair for a poorly placed knight even though the position is open, though this may not have been well-understood in 1846. Rxe7 24. Nf3 Na6 25. Kh2? 25.e5! was necessary to preserve the winning advantage. c4? Better was 25...Nb4 26.Qd2 Qa2 27.Qd1 Nxd3 28.Qxd3 Qa3 where Black threatens c4, and has a bishop pair for a knight pair and a pawn. Black has reduced his disadvantage to what it usually would be in normal chess, and thus should win given that the handicap implies a strength difference. 26. bxc4 bxc4? 26...Qa3 27.Qd1 Nb4 28.Bb1 bxc4 would give practical compensation for the missing pawn, though White still stands better. 27. Bxc4 Bb5 28. Qb3 White is up two pawns and has a decisive advantage. Ba4 29. Qe3 Bb2 30. Bxa6 Bxc1 31. Rxc1 Rxc1 32. Qxc1 Qxa6 33. Ng3 Qb7 34. f5 Be8 35. Qg5 Rg7 36. f6 Rd7 37. Nf5 Kh8 38. Ne7 Qb2 39. e5 dxe5 40. f7 1–0 Notes based on those by Larry Kaufman.

Even though Staunton lost, he missed some chances, and Harrwitz was a very strong player in his own right. This game was part of a pawn and two moves match, which Staunton won 4–3.

=== Knight odds ===
Zukertort vs. Epureanu, 1872

Position: a8 black rook, c8 black bishop, d8 black queen, e8 black knight, h8 black king, b7 black pawn, e7 black knight, g7 black pawn, a6 black pawn, d6 black bishop, e6 black pawn, f6 black pawn, g6 white queen, c5 black pawn, d5 black pawn, g5 white pawn, h5 white pawn, a3 white pawn, b3 white pawn, e3 white pawn, b2 white bishop, c2 white pawn, d2 white pawn, c1 white king, g1 white rook, h1 white rook

Position after 19...Ne7

Position: a8 black rook, c8 black bishop, d8 black queen, e8 black knight, h8 black king, b7 black pawn, f7 white pawn, g7 black pawn, a6 black pawn, d6 black bishop, e6 black pawn, g6 white pawn, c5 black pawn, d5 black pawn, a3 white pawn, b3 white pawn, e3 white pawn, b2 white bishop, c2 white pawn, d2 white pawn, c1 white king, g1 white rook

Final position; Black, ahead a queen, bishop, and knight, is defenseless.

Johannes Zukertort vs. Epureanu, Berlin 1872 (remove White's queen knight)
1. f4 e6 2. Nf3 Nf6 3. b3 d5 4. Bb2 c5 5. e3 Nc6 6. a3 a6 7. Bd3 Bd6 8. Qe2 0-0 9. g4 Nxg4? Imprudently allowing White to attack Black's king along the g-file. 10. Qg2 Nf6 11. h4 h6 12. h5 Kh8 13. 0-0-0 Ne8 14. Rdg1 Rg8 15. Bh7!! f6 (15...Kxh7 16.Qg6+!! fxg6 17.hxg6+ Kh8 18.Rxh6#) 16. Bxg8 Kxg8 17. Qg6 Kh8 18. Ng5! hxg5 19. fxg5 Ne7 20. gxf6!! Nxg6 21. hxg6+ Kg8 22. Rh8+! Kxh8 23. f7 1–0 There is no defense against mate. If 23...Qh4 (stopping the threatened 24.Rh1+), 24.fxe8(Q)+ Bf8 25.Qxf8#. Francis J. Wellmuth calls this "the finest odds-game ever played". Irving Chernev and Fred Reinfeld call the conclusion "the finest finish in this type of contest." Notes by Chernev and Reinfeld, Wellmuth, and Napier.

=== Rook odds ===
Kashdan vs. Horneman, 1930

Position: a8 black rook, d8 black queen, e8 black king, f8 black rook, a7 black pawn, d7 black knight, e7 black bishop, g7 white queen, h7 black pawn, a6 black bishop, b6 black pawn, f6 black pawn, d5 black pawn, e5 white pawn, f5 white knight, g5 white bishop, a2 white pawn, b2 white pawn, c2 white pawn, f2 white pawn, g2 white pawn, h2 white pawn, b1 white knight, e1 white king, h1 white rook

Position after 13...f6?

Position: a8 black rook, d8 black queen, e8 black king, f8 black rook, a7 black pawn, d7 black knight, e7 black bishop, g7 white knight, a6 black bishop, b6 black pawn, e6 white pawn, g6 black pawn, d5 black pawn, g5 black pawn, a2 white pawn, b2 white pawn, c2 white pawn, f2 white pawn, g2 white pawn, h2 white pawn, b1 white knight, e1 white king, h1 white rook

Final position after 16.Ng7#

Isaac Kashdan vs. Buster Horneman, Manhattan Chess Club 1930 (remove White's queen rook)
1. e4 e6 2. d4 d5 3. e5 c5 4. Qg4 cxd4 5. Nf3 Nh6 6. Qh3 Be7 7. Bd3 b6 8. Qg3 Nf5 9. Bxf5 exf5 10. Qxg7 Rf8 11. Nxd4 Ba6? 12. Nxf5 Nd7 13. Bg5 f6? 14. e6! fxg5 15. Qg6+!! hxg6 16. Ng7# 1–0

It would be a mistake to suppose that the odds-giver always wins. Even the strongest players sometimes meet with disaster:

Morphy vs. Maurian, 1855

Position: a8 black rook, e8 black king, f8 black bishop, h8 black rook, a7 black pawn, c7 black pawn, d7 black pawn, f7 black pawn, g7 black pawn, h7 black pawn, a6 black bishop, c6 black knight, f6 black knight, b5 black pawn, h5 black queen, d4 white pawn, e4 white pawn, f4 black pawn, b3 white bishop, f3 white knight, a2 white pawn, b2 white pawn, c2 white pawn, e2 white queen, g2 white pawn, h2 white pawn, b1 white knight, c1 white bishop, f1 white king, h1 white rook

Position after 9.Qe2

Position: a8 black rook, e8 black king, f8 black bishop, h8 black rook, a7 black pawn, c7 black pawn, d7 black pawn, f7 black pawn, g7 black pawn, h7 black pawn, a6 white queen, b4 black pawn, d4 white knight, e4 white pawn, f4 black pawn, g4 black knight, b3 white bishop, a2 white pawn, b2 white pawn, c2 white pawn, f2 white king, g2 white pawn, h2 white pawn, b1 white knight, c1 white bishop, d1 black queen, h1 white rook

Final position after 12...Ng4#

Paul Morphy vs. Charles Maurian, Springhill 1855 (remove White's queen rook)
1. e4 e5 2. f4 exf4 3. Bc4 Qh4+ 4. Kf1 b5 5. Bd5 Nc6 6. Nf3 Qh5 7. d4 Nf6 8. Bb3 Ba6 9. Qe2 Nxd4! 10. Nxd4 b4! 11. Qxa6?? Qd1+ 12. Kf2 Ng4# 0–1

=== Queen odds ===
Apšenieks vs. Amateur, 1934

Position: d8 black rook, f8 black rook, g8 black king, a7 black pawn, b7 black pawn, d7 black queen, f7 black pawn, g7 black pawn, h7 black knight, c6 black pawn, h6 white rook, d4 white knight, b3 white pawn, f3 white pawn, a2 white pawn, b2 white bishop, c2 white pawn, d2 white pawn, c1 white king, g1 white rook

Position after 21...Rad8

Position: d8 black rook, f8 black rook, g8 black king, a7 black pawn, b7 black pawn, d7 black queen, h7 black knight, c6 black pawn, g6 black pawn, h6 white knight, b3 white pawn, f3 white pawn, a2 white pawn, b2 white bishop, c2 white pawn, d2 white pawn, c1 white king

Final position after 25.Nh6#

Apšenieks vs. Amateur, Riga 1934 (remove White's queen)
1. b3 e5 2. Bb2 d6 3. Nc3 Be7 4. 0-0-0 Nf6 5. f3 0-0 6. e3 c6 7. g4 h6 8. Nge2 Be6 9. Ng3 Nbd7 10. h4 Nh7 11. g5 hxg5 12. hxg5 Bxg5 13. Bd3 Bh6 14. Rdg1 d5 15. Nf5 Bxf5 16. Bxf5 Qf6 17. Bxd7 d4 18. exd4 exd4 19. Ne2 Qe7 20. Nxd4 Qxd7 21. Rxh6 Rad8 22. Rxg7+! Kxg7 23. Nf5+ (double check) Kg8 24. Rg6+! fxg6 25. Nh6# 1–0

=== Ringed piece ===
Lange vs. von Schierstedt, 1856

Position: a8 black rook, f8 black bishop, h8 black rook, a7 black pawn, b7 black pawn, c7 black pawn, e7 black queen, g7 black king, h7 black pawn, c6 black knight, d6 black pawn, e6 black bishop, h6 black knight, h5 white queen, d4 white pawn, e4 white pawn, f4 white rook, e3 white bishop, a2 white pawn, b2 white pawn, c2 white pawn, e2 white knight, g2 white king, h2 white pawn, f1 white rook

Position after 14.Raf1

Position: a8 black rook, f8 black bishop, h8 black rook, a7 black pawn, b7 black pawn, c7 black pawn, e7 black queen, h7 black pawn, c6 black knight, d6 black pawn, f5 white knight, h5 black bishop, d4 white pawn, e4 white pawn, h4 black king, e3 white bishop, h3 white pawn, a2 white pawn, b2 white pawn, c2 white pawn, g2 white king

Final position: the ringed knight mates.

Max Lange vs. Jenny von Schierstedt, Halle 1856 (White's queen knight is the ringed piece with which he must checkmate)
1. e4 e5 2. Nc3 Nc6 3. f4 exf4 4. Nf3 g5 5. Bc4 g4 6. 0-0 gxf3 7. d4 fxg2 8. Bxf7+ Kxf7 9. Qh5+ Kg7 10. Rxf4 Nh6 11. Be3 d6 12. Ne2 Qe7 13. Kxg2 Be6 14. Raf1 Bf7? Black could have won with 14...Qg5+!!, when 15.Qxg5# would checkmate Black, but violate the stipulation that the queen knight must checkmate. 15. Qxh6+!! Kxh6 16. Rg4+ Kh5 17. Ng3+ Kxg4 18. Rf5 h6 19. h3+ Kh4 20. Rh5+ Bxh5 21. Nf5# 1–0

=== Pion coiffé ===
Staunton vs. Taverner

Position: a8 black rook, b8 black knight, c8 black bishop, d8 black queen, e8 black king, f8 black bishop, g8 black knight, h8 black rook, a7 black pawn, b7 black pawn, c7 black pawn, f7 black pawn, g7 black pawn, h7 black pawn, d5 black pawn, e5 black pawn, g3 white knight, a2 white pawn, b2 white pawn, c2 white pawn, d2 white pawn, e2 white pawn, f2 white pawn, g2 white pawn, h2 white pawn, a1 white rook, c1 white bishop, d1 white queen, e1 white king, f1 white bishop, g1 white knight, h1 white rook

Position after 3.Ng3; White guards the capped pawn against frontal attack.

Position: d8 white bishop, h8 black king, e7 white queen, g7 white pawn, f6 white knight, e5 white king, f5 white pawn

Final position; the capped pawn gives mate.

Howard Staunton vs. Taverner?, date unknown (White's pawn on g2 is the capped pawn, with which he must give checkmate)
1. Nc3 e5 2. Ne4 d5 3. Ng3 Covering the pawn to make it less assailable by Black's pieces. f5 4. e3 Bd6 5. c4 h5 6. Nxh5 Qg5 7. Ng3 f4 8. exf4 Not 8.Nf3??, when 8...Bh3! would win the g-pawn and the game. exf4 9. d4 Qg6 10. Bd3 Qh6 Now Black threatens 11...Qh3! and wins. 11. Qh5+ Qxh5 12. Nxh5 Rxh5 13. Bg6+ Ke7 14. Bxh5 Nf6 15. Bf3 g5 16. c5 g4 17. cxd6+ cxd6 18. Bxg4 Bxg4 19. Bxf4 Nh5 20. Bg3 Nc6 21. h3 21.f3? Be6 22.Ne2 Rg8 23.Kf2 Bh3! 24.gxh3 Nxg3 followed by 25...Rh8 would win the capped pawn. Be6 22. Ne2 Rg8 23. Rc1 Bf5 24. Rc3 Be4 25. Re3 Nb4 26. Kd2 Nxa2 27. Ra1 Nb4 28. Rxa7 Nc6 29. Rxb7+ Ke6 30. Rh7 Rg5 31. Rxe4+ dxe4 32. Rxh5 Rxh5 33. Nf4+ Ke7 34. Nxh5 Nxd4 35. Ke3 Nc2+ 36. Kxe4 Ne1 Attacking the "game pawn". 37. Bh4+ Kd7 38. g4 Kc6 39. f4 Nc2 40. f5 d5+ 41. Kf4 d4 42. Bf2 d3 43. Be3 Nd4 44. Ke4 d2 45. Bxd2 Nb3 46. Be3 Kd6 47. Nf6 Kc6 48. h4 Na5 49. h5 Nc4 50. Bf4 Nxb2 51. h6 Na4 52. h7 Nc5+ 53. Ke3 Kb5 54. Ne4 Na6 55. h8=Q Ka5 56. Qc3+ Kb5 57. Qb3+ Ka5 58. Nc3 Nc5 59. Bc7+ Ka6 60. Qb5+ Ka7 61. Qxc5+ Ka6 Deliberately allowing checkmate. 62. Qa5+ Kb7 63. Ke4 Kc8 64. Qa7 Kd7 65. Qb7 Ke7 66. Qc8 Kf6 67. Bd8+ Kg7 68. Qe6 Kf8 69. Qe7+ Kg8 70. Nd5 Kh8 71. g5 Kg8 72. g6 Kh8 73. Ke5 Kg8 74. Nf6+ Kh8 75. g7# 1–0 Notes by Staunton, who wrote that he and his opponent played many games at these odds, of which this was "perhaps the weakest, but ... also the shortest".

=== Odds of queen ===
In response for receiving the queen, Black undertakes to force White to checkmate Black.

Paris vs. Marseille, 1878

Position: a6 black queen, b6 black knight, a5 black king, b5 black bishop, a4 black pawn, c4 black pawn, b3 black pawn, c3 white pawn, d2 black queen, b1 white king, e1 white bishop, h1 black queen

Position after 67.Kb1

Position: h7 black queen, a6 black queen, b6 black knight, a5 black king, b5 black bishop, a4 black pawn, c4 black pawn, b3 black pawn, c3 white bishop, a1 white king

Final position; Black, having forced White to give checkmate, wins.

Paris vs. Marseille, correspondence 1878 (remove White's queen)
1. d4 d5 2. Nc3 c6 3. Nf3 g6 4. e4 e6 5. e5 Bb4 6. Bd2 Bxc3 7. Bxc3 b5 8. h4 h5 9. 0-0-0 a6 10. Ng5 f5 11. g3 Nh6 12. Bd3 Nf7 13. Bxf5? gxf5 14. Nxf7 Kxf7 15. Bd2 Nd7 16. Rhe1 c5 17. dxc5 Nxc5 18. Bg5 Qg8 19. Re3 Bb7 20. Rc3 Rc8 21. Be3 Nd7 22. Bd4 Rxc3 23. bxc3 a5 24. Kd2 a4 25. Rb1 Ba6 26. Rg1 Qg4 27. Rb1 Rc8 28. Rb4 Rc4 29. Rxc4 dxc4 30. a3 f4 31. Kc1 fxg3 32. fxg3 Qxg3 33. Kb2 Qxh4 34. Kc1 Qe1+ 35. Kb2 Qd1 36. Ba7 Nxe5 37. Bc5 h4 38. Bd4 Nc6 39. Be3 e5 40. Bf2 h3 41. Bg3 e4 42. Bf4 Ke6 43. Bg3 e3 44. Bf4 e2 45. Bg3 Kd7 46. Bh2 e1=Q 47. Bf4 Qee2 48. Bg3 Qdxc2+ 49. Ka1 Qf1+ 50. Be1 Qd2 Now White is reduced to shuffling the king back and forth while Black sets up selfmate. 51. Kb1 h2 52. Ka1 h1=Q 53. Kb1 Qf8 54. Ka1 Qxa3+ 55. Kb1 Qad6 56. Ka1 Qf6 57. Kb1 Kc7 58. Ka1 b4 59. Kb1 b3 60. Ka1 Kb6 61. Kb1 Ka5 62. Ka1 Ne7! 63. Kb1 Nc8 64. Ka1 Bb5 65. Kb1 Qa6! 66. Ka1 Nb6 67. Kb1 Qh7+ (not 67...Qhxe1#??, when White wins) 68. Ka1 Qxc3+! 69. Bxc3# The only legal move. 0–1 Black, having forced White to checkmate, wins.

== See also ==
- Handicap (shogi)
