= Edward Lyttelton =

English schoolmaster and cleric (1855–1942)

The Honorable Edward Lyttelton
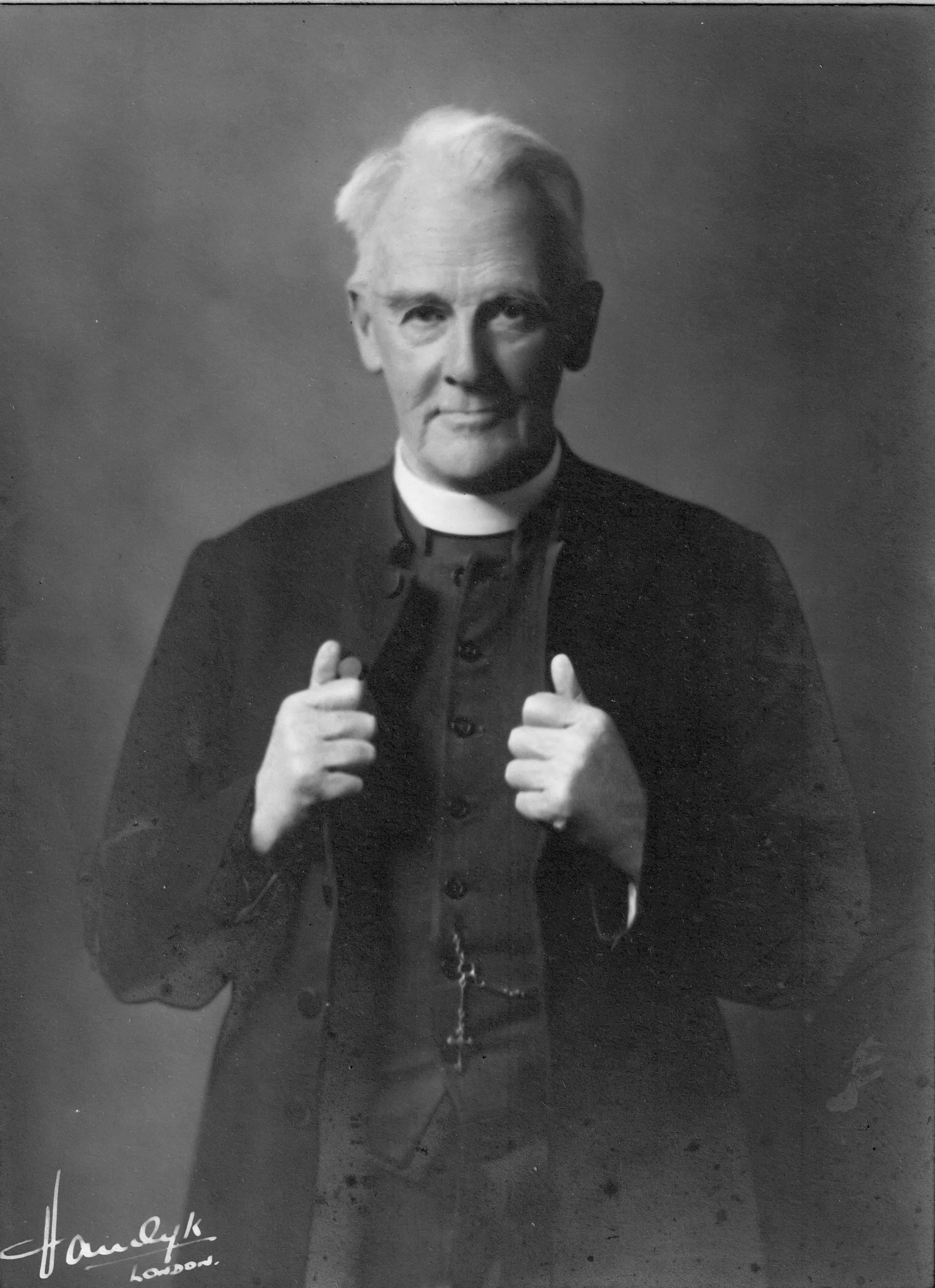
- Portrait by Carl Vandyk
- Born: 23 July 1855; Hagley, Worcestershire, England
- Died: 26 January 1942 (aged 86); Lincoln, Lincolnshire, England
- Education: Eton College
- Alma mater: Trinity College, Cambridge
- Spouse: Caroline Amy West (m. 1888)
- Children: 2
- Parents: George Lyttelton, 4th Baron Lyttelton (father); Mary Glynne (mother)
- Relatives: Alfred Lyttelton (brother); Charles Lyttelton (brother); George Lyttelton (brother); Arthur Lyttelton (brother); Robert Lyttelton (brother)
- Cricket career

Cricket information
- Batting: Right-handed
- Role: Batsman

Domestic team information
- Years: Team
- 1875–1878: Cambridge University
- 1878–1882: Middlesex

Career statistics
Competition	First-class
Matches	57
Runs scored	2,013
Batting average	22.36
100s/50s	1/9
Top score	113
Balls bowled	136
Wickets	1
Bowling average	50.00
5 wickets in innings	0
10 wickets in match	0
Best bowling	1/4
Catches/stumpings	43/–
- Source: CricketArchive, 8 October 2022
Association football career
- Position: Defender
Senior career*
Years	Team	Apps	(Gls)
1876-1877	Old Etonians		
1878	Cambridge University		
International career
1878	England	1	(0)
- * Club domestic league appearances and goals

Edward Lyttelton (23 July 1855 – 26 January 1942) was an English schoolmaster, cleric and sportsman from the Lyttelton family who was headmaster of Eton College from 1905 to 1916. During his early years he played first-class cricket for Cambridge University and Middlesex.

== Early life and family ==
Lyttelton was born at Hagley, Worcestershire on 23 July 1855 to George Lyttelton, 4th Baron Lyttelton and his first wife, Mary (née Glynne; 1813–1857), sister-in-law of William Gladstone.

His was a sporting family, with five of his seven brothers playing first-class cricket: Alfred, Charles, George, Arthur and Robert.

Lyttelton was educated at Eton College followed by Trinity College, Cambridge, where he became a member and club librarian of the University Pitt Club.

== Sporting career ==
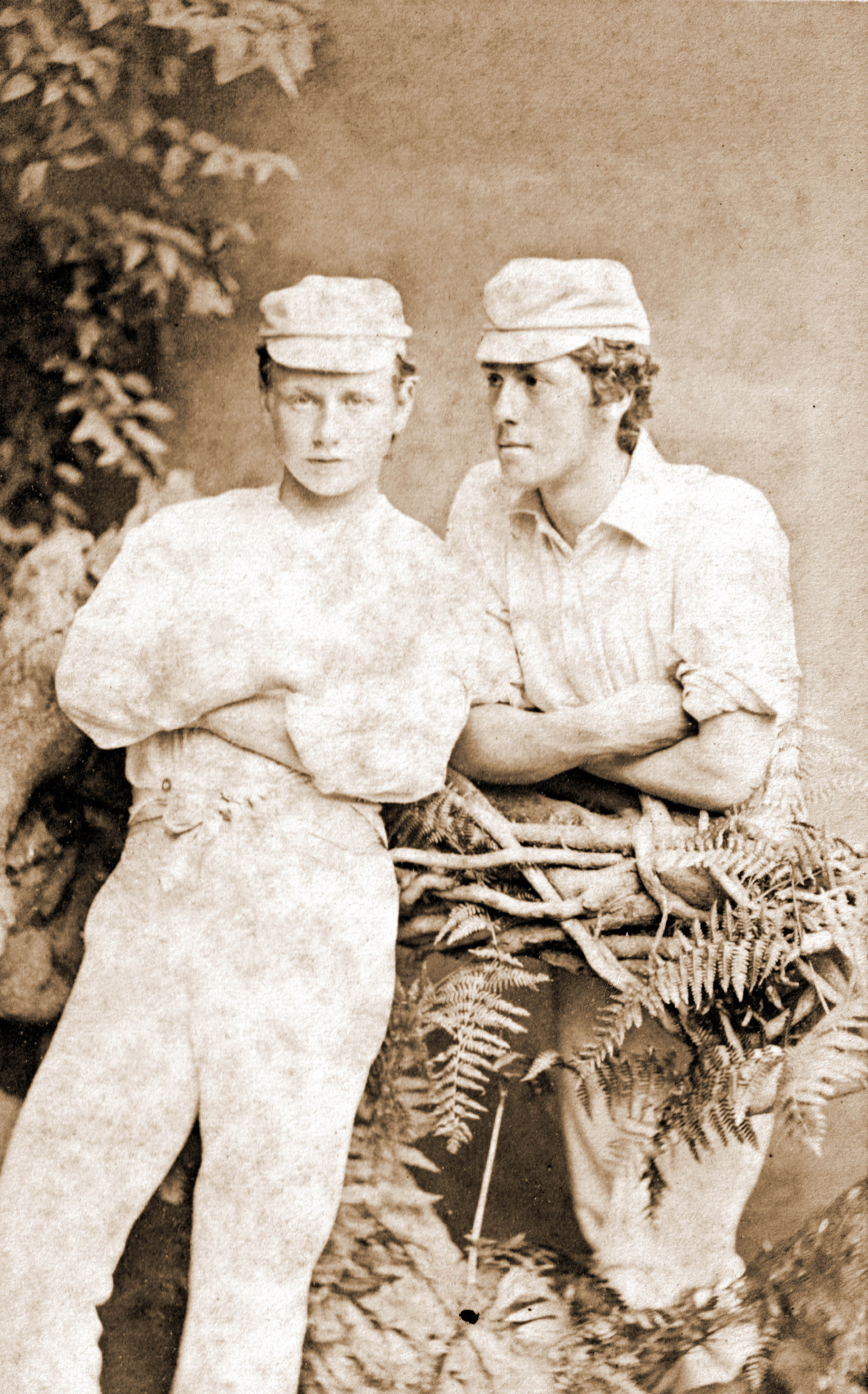
Lyttelton (right) and his younger brother Alfred at Eton, circa 1872

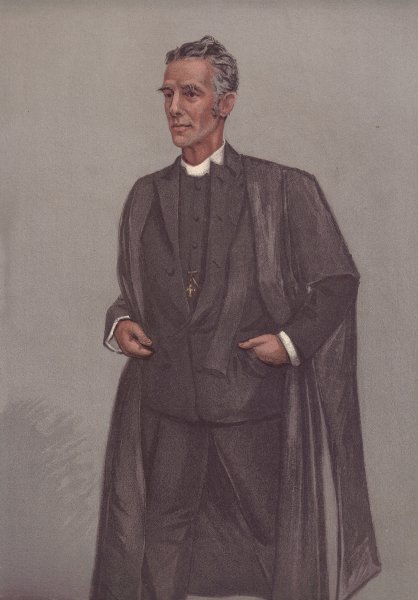
As caricatured by Spy in Vanity Fair, 1901

A right-handed middle order batsman, Lyttelton had his best season in 1878 when he amassed 779 runs at 29.96, helping Middlesex to finish as joint Champions. He scored his only first-class hundred that year, an innings of 113 which he made while playing for Middlesex against the touring Australian side, at Lord's. His century stood out as it occurred in the fourth innings, was double the next highest score in the match by either team (56) and was made despite Middlesex being bowled out for just 185. According to Wisden, Lyttelton's last 76 runs came in only 74 minutes. In the same season, Lyttelton took the only wicket of his first-class career, Yorkshire opening batsman George Ulyett, who also batted for England. He dismissed him, caught and bowled, in a match for Cambridge University against Yorkshire. Aside from Cambridge University and Middlesex he also represented the Gentlemen cricket team, I Zingari, Marylebone Cricket Club and the South of England cricket team.

Lyttelton's only full football international came in a 7–2 defeat by Scotland on 2 March 1878. Another significant achievement in the sport was playing in the 1876 FA Cup Final with the Old Etonians F.C., as a defender, which they lost to the Wanderers on a replay. When picked for England he had been representing Cambridge University.

== Teaching career and marriage ==
From 1880 to 1882, Lyttelton worked as an assistant master at Wellington College, and then at Eton College. He attended Cuddesdon College in 1883–1884 in preparation for his ordination in 1886.

In 1888 Lyttelton married Caroline Amy West, daughter of the Very Reverend John West, dean of St Patrick's Cathedral, Dublin. They went on to have two daughters.

He was appointed master of Haileybury College in 1890, where he remained until 1905 when he became headmaster of Eton College. There he introduced reforms allowing boys to enter the school without knowledge of Greek, and once there to avoid classics entirely in favour of mathematics, modern languages, science or history.

His Christian principles made his position difficult after the outbreak of the First World War, especially following the reception to his sermon at St Margaret's, Westminster, in March 1915, in which he argued that the whole German nation should not be condemned and that any peace settlement should be generous. This led to a public storm of protest, and following a personal spiritual crisis Lyttelton resigned his post in 1916.

== Vegetarianism ==
Lyttleton objected to the cruelties involved with hunting but whilst headmaster did not abolish beagling at Eton College. This caused controversy with members of the Humanitarian League who campaigned to stop the beagling on ethical grounds and substitute it with drag hunting. Lyttleton defended the beagling at Eton and criticized the Humanitarian League commenting, "I ask you why the death of a dozen or so hares should excite all this uproar when thousands of cattle are transported over the sea under conditions involving appalling suffering because people, like the majority of your members, have persuaded themselves that they cannot live without eating these animals?".

Lyttelton became a vegetarian in 1902 but added fish to his diet during World War I due to lack of food supplies. He returned to vegetarianism after the war and argued that meat had done more harm to health than alcohol at a Vegetarian Society event in Manchester. He recommended cheese and fruit. In 1918, he wrote an article arguing that abstinence from meat increases spiritual-mindedness and stated that "there is something about meat which even in small quantities stirs not only the nerves but the thoughts in the wrong direction". Lyttelton delivered a speech on "The Rights of Animals" for the London Vegetarian Society in 1923.

== Clerical career and final years ==
Lyttelton gave up teaching and in 1917 became curate to the Reverend Richard "Dick" Sheppard at St Martin-in-the-Fields, following which he worked as rector of the small parish of Sidestrand in Norfolk from 1918 to 1920. In 1920 he became dean of Whitelands College, Chelsea, a teacher training college for women, acting both as lecturer on the Bible and as chaplain. He retired in 1929.

He was appointed to the position of honorary canon at Norwich in 1931–1941 and during the last year of his life honorary canon at Lincoln. He died at his home, the Old Palace, Lincoln, on 26 January 1942.

== Publications ==
- Studies in the Sermon on the Mount
- The Gospel of St. Mark with Notes
- What Are We Fighting For?
- Character and Religion. New York: Fleming H. Revell Company. 1912.

Academic offices
Preceded by Edmond Warre	Head Master of Eton College; 1905–1916	Succeeded by Cyril Alington
