= Selfe =

Selfe is a surname. Notable people with the surname include:

- James Selfe (born 1955), South African politician
- Ray Selfe (1837–1873), English lawyer and politician
- Norman Selfe (1839–1911), Australian engineer
- William Lucius Selfe (1845-1924), British judge
