= Lake Selfe =

Lake in Selwyn District, New Zealand

- Te Ruahikihiki (Māori)
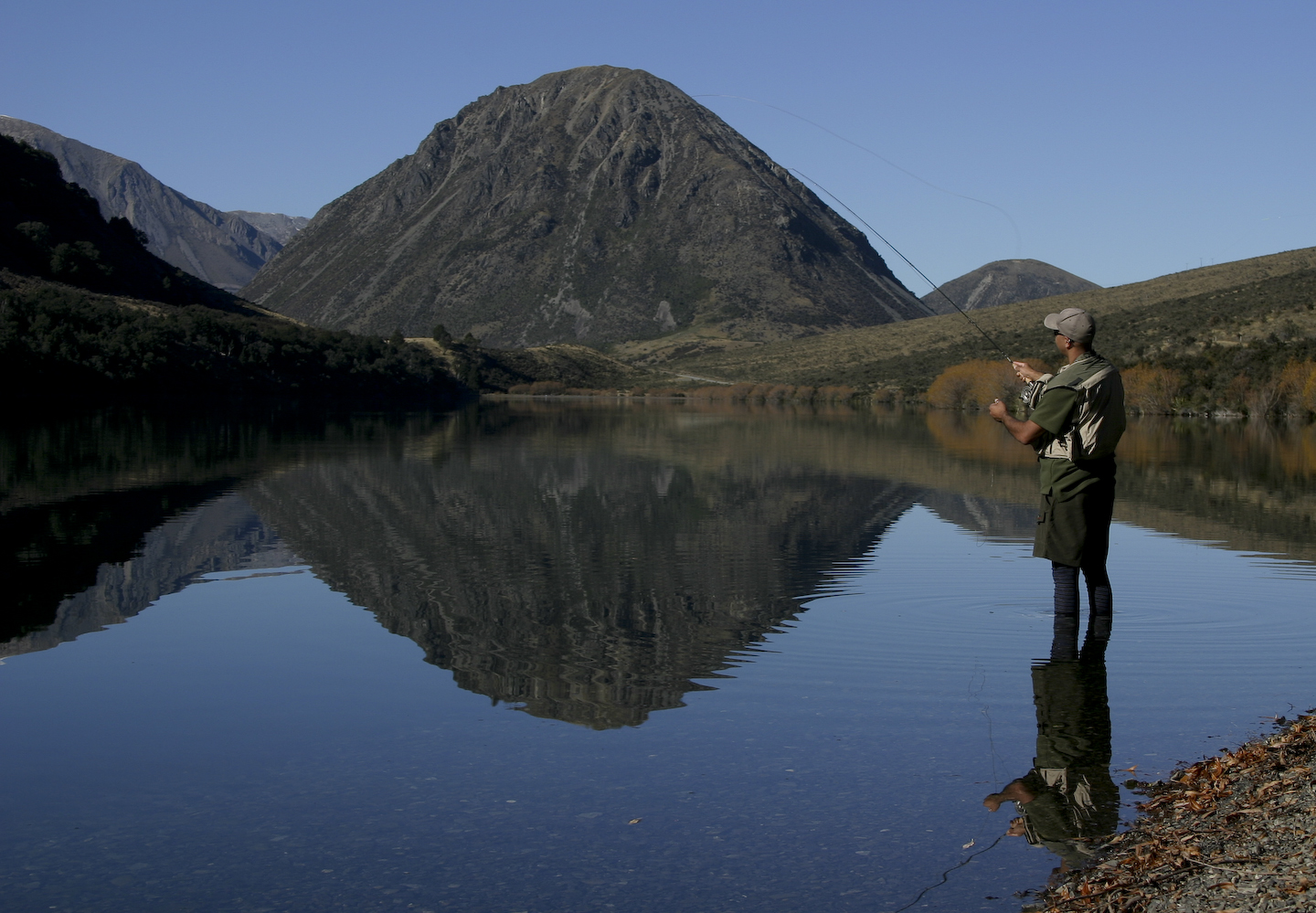
- Fly fishing at Lake Selfe, with Mount Hennah in the background
- Interactive map of Lake Selfe
- Coordinates: 43.239°S 171.519°E
- Basin countries: New Zealand
- Surface elevation: 574 m (1,883 ft)

Lake Selfe, or Te Ruahikihiki in Māori, is a lake in the Selwyn District of the Canterbury Region in the South Island of New Zealand.

== Geography ==
Lake Selfe is situated in the Selwyn District between the Cottons Sheep Range, which reaches heights of up to 1,470 m (4,820 ft) to the south and west, and Mount Ida, which rises to 1,695 m (5,561 ft) to the north-northeast, as well as Little Mount Ida, which rises to 1,050 m (3,440 ft) to the east. The 64.3 ha (159-acre) lake stretches at an elevation of 574 m (1,883 ft) and is approximately 2.09 km (1.30 mi) long in a northwest–southeast direction. At its widest point, it measures approximately 540 m (1,770 ft) in a southwest–northeast direction. The lake's circumference is approximately 4.77 km (2.96 mi).

Lake Selfe is fed by a few streams and has its outflow—Moss Burn—at the northwest end of the lake. Its waters flow via Lake Henrietta into the Harper River.

== Naming ==
The original Māori name of the lake is Te Ruahikihiki. The European name given to the lake was for Henry Selfe, a member of the Canterbury Association.

== See also ==
- List of lakes of New Zealand
