= Henry Selfe =

Member of the Canterbury Association (1810–1870)

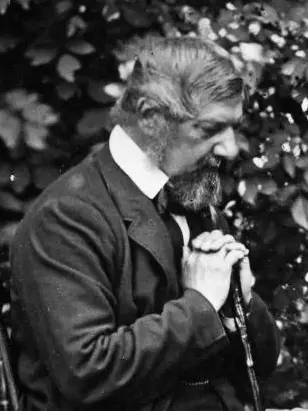
- Selfe in 1868

Agent in London for the Canterbury Provincial Council
- In office September 1852 – 1866
- Preceded by: Henry Sewell
- Succeeded by: Crosbie Ward

Personal details
- Born: Henry James Selfe Page; 15 November 1810 Portland Square, Bristol, England
- Died: 6 September 1870 (aged 59) St George's Square, Pimlico, London
- Spouse: Anna Maria Spooner (m. 1840)
- Children: four sons and three daughters, including William Lucius Selfe
- Occupation: Barrister

Henry James Selfe Selfe (né Page, 15 November 1810 – 6 September 1870) was a barrister. He was one of the most important members of the Canterbury Association that helped to establish Christchurch and the Canterbury Region in New Zealand.

== Early life ==
Selfe was born at Portland Square in Bristol (Note: An older source states that he was born in Rose Hill House in Red Hill, Worcester.) on 15 November 1810 as Henry James Selfe Page. His parents were Sarah Ann Selfe and the Rev. Henry Page. His maternal grandfather was James Page, who died in 1830. On 1 February 1832, in the course of inheriting his maternal grandfather's estate in Trowbridge, Wiltshire, through his mother as the only heir of his grandfather, he changed his surname to Selfe by royal license.

== Career ==
Selfe was educated in law at Glasgow University and in 1834, he was called to the bar. He practised in London and at the parliamentary bar. He became the police magistrate at the Thames Police Court in 1856, and moved to the Westminster Court in 1863.

Selfe was a member of the Canterbury Association, formed to found the settlement of Canterbury in New Zealand. In September 1852, when Henry Sewell left for Canterbury as the Canterbury Association's agent in New Zealand, Selfe was appointed honorary agent in London for the Canterbury Provincial Council in succession to Sewell. He resigned in 1866 over incomplete financial details given to him by Samuel Bealey, the superintendent of Canterbury Province. He was succeeded in this role by Crosbie Ward.

== New Zealand ==
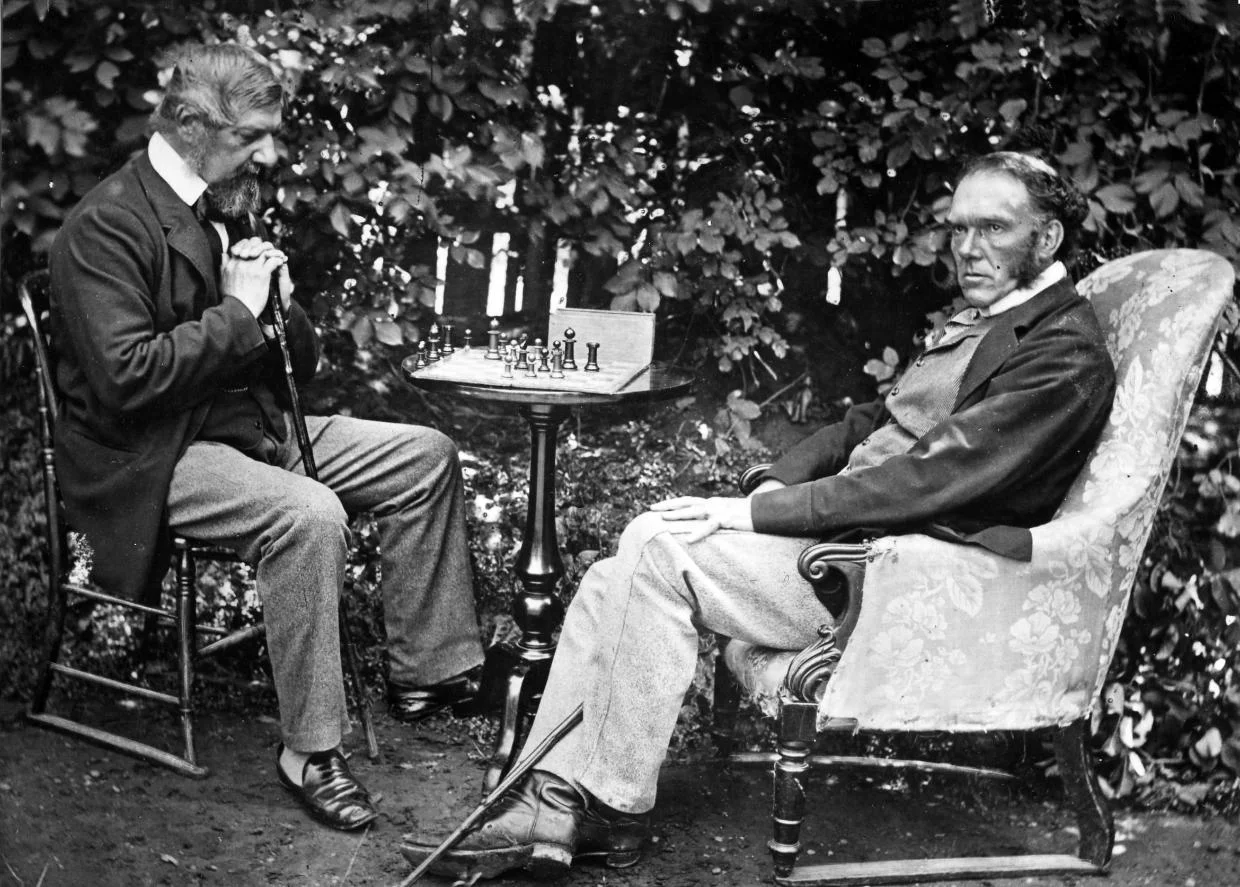
Selfe (left) and Lord Lyttelton in Alfred Barker's garden in Christchurch in February 1868

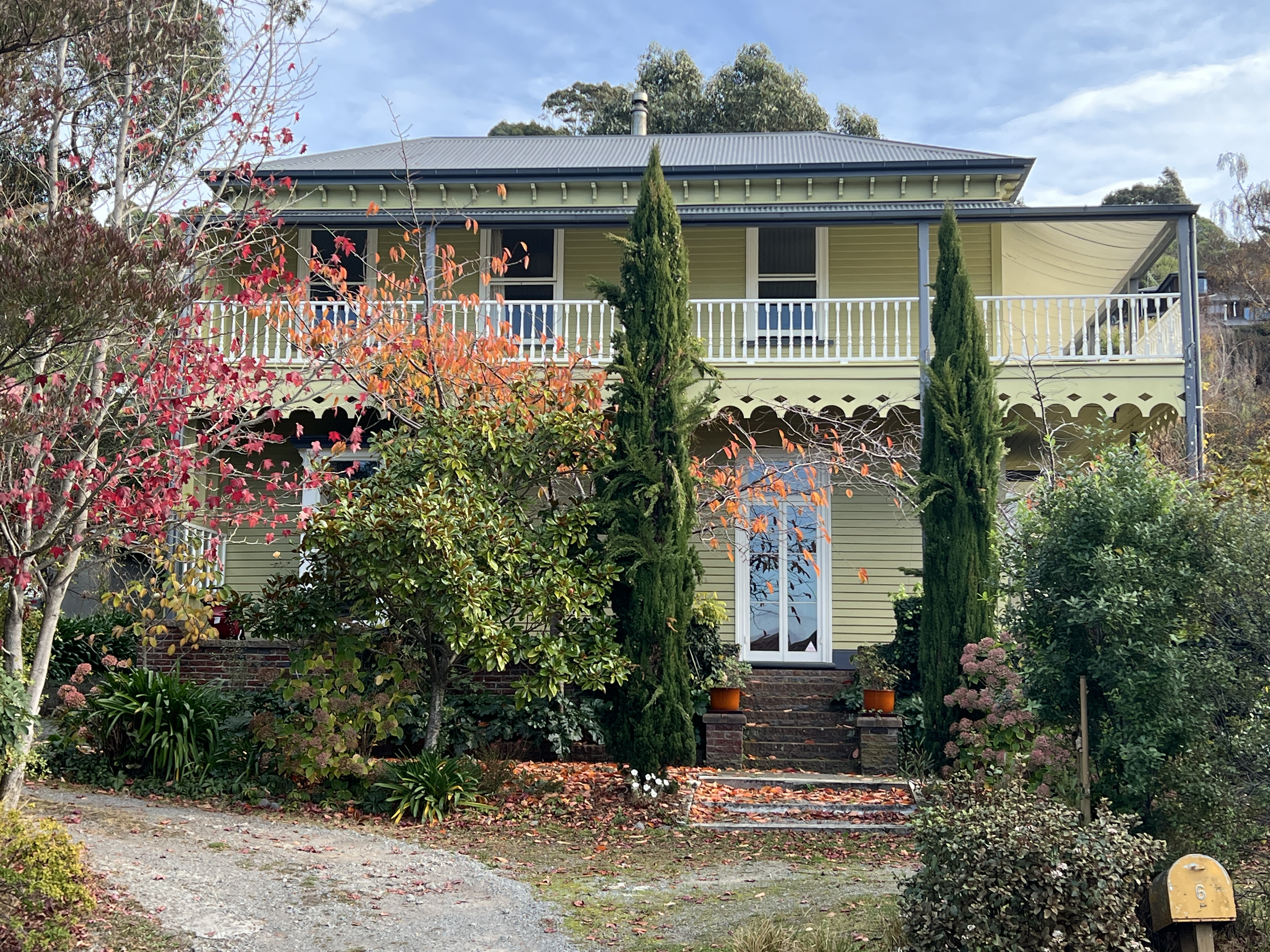
Glenmore, built for Selfe but never lived in by him

In 1851 while still living in England Selfe purchased property in Canterbury and had farm manager John Cordy stock the land and build in 1857, at the cost of £100, a one-storey six-roomed house. In 1863 he arranged the sale of the property to Major Henry Scott, who named it Glenmore. The house, one of the oldest in Christchurch, is now an historic building.

Selfe and Lord Lyttelton visited New Zealand in 1868. They left on the Panama mail steamer in December 1867, and changed in Panama to the SS Ruahine. They arrived in Wellington on 25 January 1868. Lord Lyttelton was accompanied by one of his sons, George William Spencer Lyttelton. They left on the same day on the SS Phoebe for Port Lyttelton, where they arrived the following night. The historian George Macdonald judged that the two were the most important members of the Canterbury Association, and that it was the first visit for both of them.

Alfred Barker organised a breakfast with the visitors for those who arrived on the First Four Ships. A committee was formed to arrange a public dinner with the guests, and a ball on a separate occasion. The dinner was held on 5 February, the breakfast the following day, and the ball on 7 February. The three events were held at the Town Hall (then in High Street) and the provincial superintendent, James FitzGerald, presided at the dinner and the breakfast. The ball was attended by 150 people, where double that had been expected. All three events were affected by the worst flooding that Christchurch had ever experienced, with outlying districts cut off. Lord Lyttelton said afterwards that "the tedium of the voyage was lessened by Selfe's good company". They started their return journey on 6 March 1868.

Selfe bought a 100 acres (40 ha) section in the Christchurch suburb of Hillsborough and tasked James FitzGerald and John Cordy with managing it. Cordy built a house on the land, but Selfe never lived in it. A subsequent owner named the house and property Glenmore, and the house still stands. The building is registered as Category 2 by Heritage New Zealand.

== Family, death, and commemoration ==
Selfe married Anna Maria Spooner in 1840, the eldest daughter of William Spooner. Catharine Spooner thus became his sister-in-law; she would marry Archibald Campbell Tait in 1842. Tait later became the Archbishop of Canterbury. His wife's father was Sir Lucius O'Brien, 3rd Baronet, who was a member of Parliament of Ireland (1761–1795), and her uncle was Sir Edward O'Brien, 4th Baronet, who sat in the House of Commons of the United Kingdom (1802–1826). O'Brien's son and his wife's cousin, The Hon. Henry O'Brien, married Henrietta Godley, the daughter of John Robert Godley, the latter being considered the founder of Canterbury. The Selfes had three daughters and four sons; one of the sons was the judge William Lucius Selfe.

Selfe died on 6 September 1870 at 15 St George's Square in Pimlico, London. He is buried in the graveyard at St Mary's Church, Addington (memorial number 30), not far from where the Tait family is buried (memorial number 151). He shares his grave with his son Edward Henry Selfe (1843–1880) and his wife (1812–1899).

Selfe is commemorated in New Zealand by Lake Selfe and a stained glass panel at the Church of St Michael and All Angels in Christchurch.
