= William Lucius Selfe =

British judge

Sir William Lucius Selfe (11 June 1845 – 19 March 1924) was a British judge.

He was born in London, the son of Henry Selfe, a metropolitan police magistrate. He was educated at Rugby School and graduated with a BA from Corpus Christi College, Oxford in 1868. He studied law at the Inner Temple and was called to the bar in 1870.

He became a judge of the county courts in 1882, and was appointed Justice of the Peace for Breconshire. He was assistant editor of the revised edition of the statutes (1870–1878) and as editor of Chronological Table and Index to Statutes (1877–1882).

He was knighted in the 1897 Diamond Jubilee Honours.

In 1876, he married Ellen, the daughter of Henry Sanford Bicknell of Clapham Common. He died at his residence at Connaught Square, aged 78.
