= George Lyttelton, 4th Baron Lyttelton =

English Conservative politician (1817–1876)

The Right Honourable The Lord Lyttelton KCMG PC DL FRS
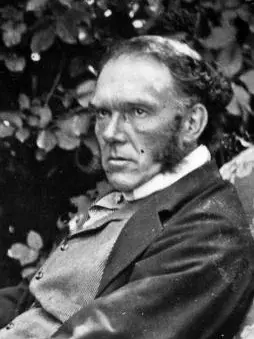
- Lord Lyttelton in 1868

Personal details
- Born: 31 March 1817
- Died: 19 April 1876 (aged 59) London, England
- Spouses: Mary Glynne (m. 1839; died 1857) Sybella Harriet Clive (m. 1869)
- Children: 15 (12 with Glynne, incl. Charles; 3 with Clive)
- Parent(s): William Lyttelton, 3rd Baron Lyttelton; Lady Sarah Spencer

George William Lyttelton, 4th Baron Lyttelton, 4th Baron Westcote, KCMG, PC, DL, FRS (31 March 1817 – 19 April 1876) was an English aristocrat and Conservative politician from the Lyttelton family. He was chairman of the Canterbury Association, which encouraged British settlers to move to New Zealand.

== Early life ==
Lyttelton was the eldest son of William Henry Lyttelton, 3rd Baron Lyttelton, and Lady Sarah Spencer, daughter of George John Spencer, 2nd Earl Spencer. He was educated at Eton and Trinity College, Cambridge. He succeeded his father as fourth Baron Lyttelton in 1837 and took his seat in the House of Lords on his 21st birthday a year later. The Lyttelton seat is Hagley Hall in Worcestershire.

== Political career ==
In January 1846 Lyttelton became Under-Secretary of State for War and the Colonies in the Conservative government of Sir Robert Peel, a post he held until the government fell in June of the same year. Lyttelton was also Lord Lieutenant of Worcestershire from 1839 to 1876 and the first President of the Birmingham and Midland Institute in 1854. Moreover, he promoted the settlement (1850 onwards) of Canterbury, New Zealand with Anglican colonists. The port town Lyttelton, New Zealand, bears his name. He visited Canterbury in late January to early March 1868, accompanied by his son George William Spencer and Henry Selfe.

Lyttelton served as president of the British Chess Association at the time of the Staunton–Morphy controversy in 1858. He was appointed a Knight Commander of the Order of St Michael and St George (KCMG) in the 1869 Birthday Honours.

== Family ==
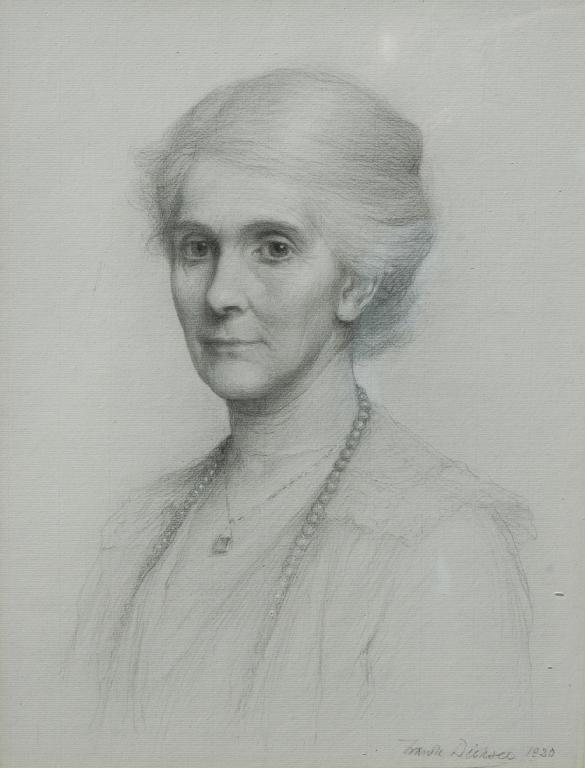
Hon. Lavinia Lyttelton (1920) by Frank Bernard Dicksee

Lord Lyttelton married, firstly in 1839, Mary Glynne, daughter of Sir Stephen Glynne, 8th Baronet, and sister-in-law of William Ewart Gladstone. They had eight sons and four daughters:

- The Honourable Meriel Sarah Lyttelton (1840–1925) married John Gilbert Talbot and was the mother of Meriel Talbot.
- The Honourable Lucy Caroline Lyttelton (1841–1925), married Lord Frederick Cavendish and the Lucy Cavendish College at Cambridge is named after her.
- Charles Lyttelton, 8th Viscount Cobham (1842–1922) succeeded his father.
- The Honourable Rev Albert Victor Lyttelton (1844–1928), Headmaster of St Andrew's School, Bloemfontein (1884–1885).
- The Honourable Neville Gerald Lyttelton (1845–1931), became a General in the British Army.
- The Honourable George William Spencer Lyttelton (1847–1913), was a British civil servant and private secretary to Gladstone.
- The Honourable Lavinia Lyttelton (1849–1939), married Right Rev Edward Stuart Talbot and she was a founder of Lady Margaret Hall.
- The Honourable May Lyttelton (1850–1875), whom Arthur Balfour had hoped to marry. Balfour remained a bachelor thereafter.
- The Honourable Arthur Temple Lyttelton (1852–1903), became an Anglican Bishop
- The Honourable Robert Henry Lyttelton (1854–1939), cricketer.
- The Honourable Edward Lyttelton (1855–1942), became headmaster of Eton College
- The Honourable Alfred Lyttelton (1857–1913), sportsman and politician.

After Mary's death in 1857 Lyttelton married, secondly, Sybella Harriet Clive, daughter of George Clive MP, in 1869. They had three daughters:

- The Honourable Sarah Kathleen Lyttelton (12 May 1870 – 1 October 1942); she married John Bailey on 26 April 1900. They had children.
- The Honourable Sybil Lyttelton (17 February 1873 – 2 October 1934); she married Sir Lionel Cust on 16 July 1895. They had one son.
- The Honourable Hester Margaret Lyttelton (26 December 1874 – 26 March 1958); she married Very Reverend Cyril Argentine Alington on 5 April 1904. They had six children.

== Death ==
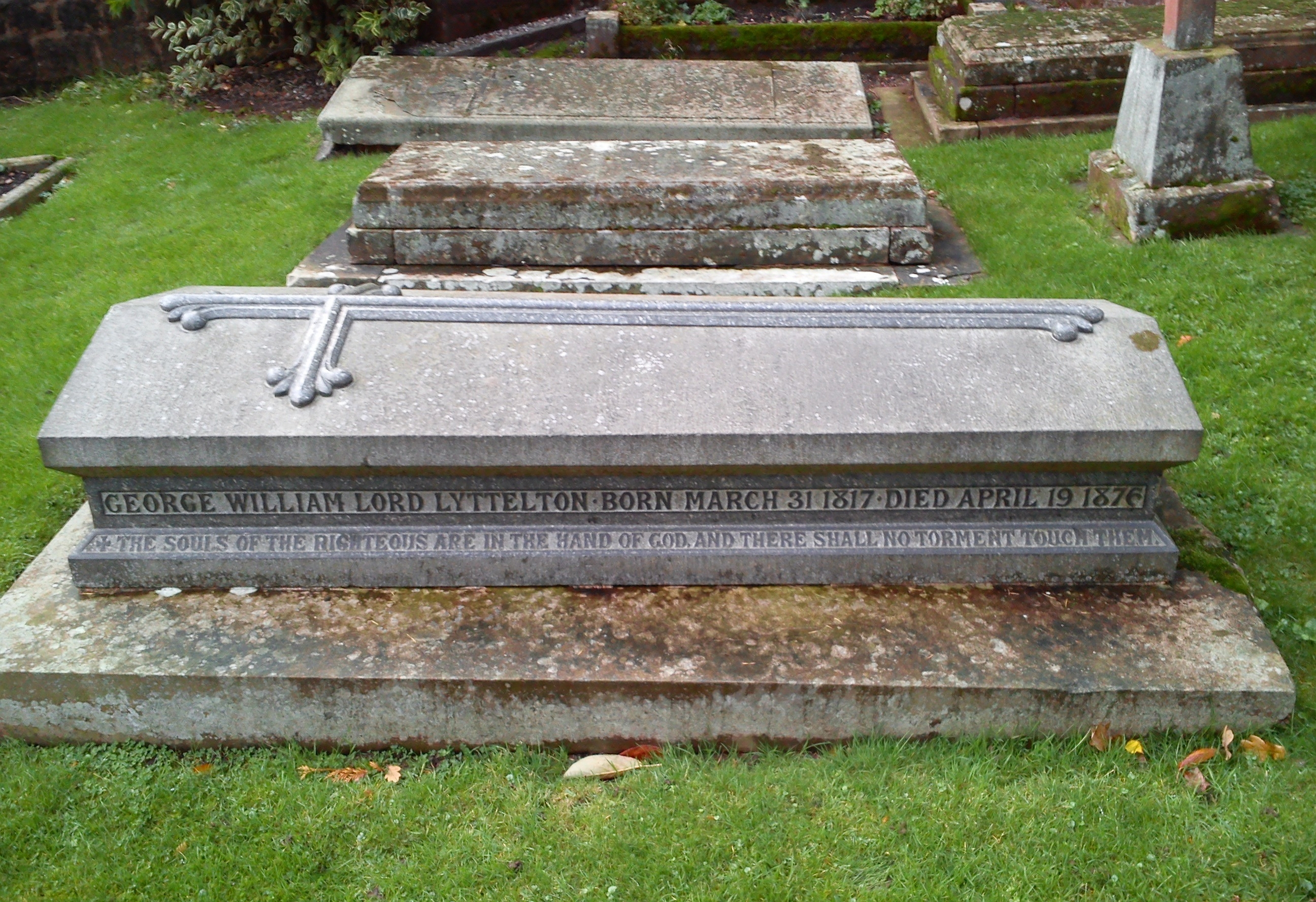
St John the Baptist Church, Hagley, grave of the 4th Baron Lyttelton and of his second wife Sybella Harriet (née Clive).

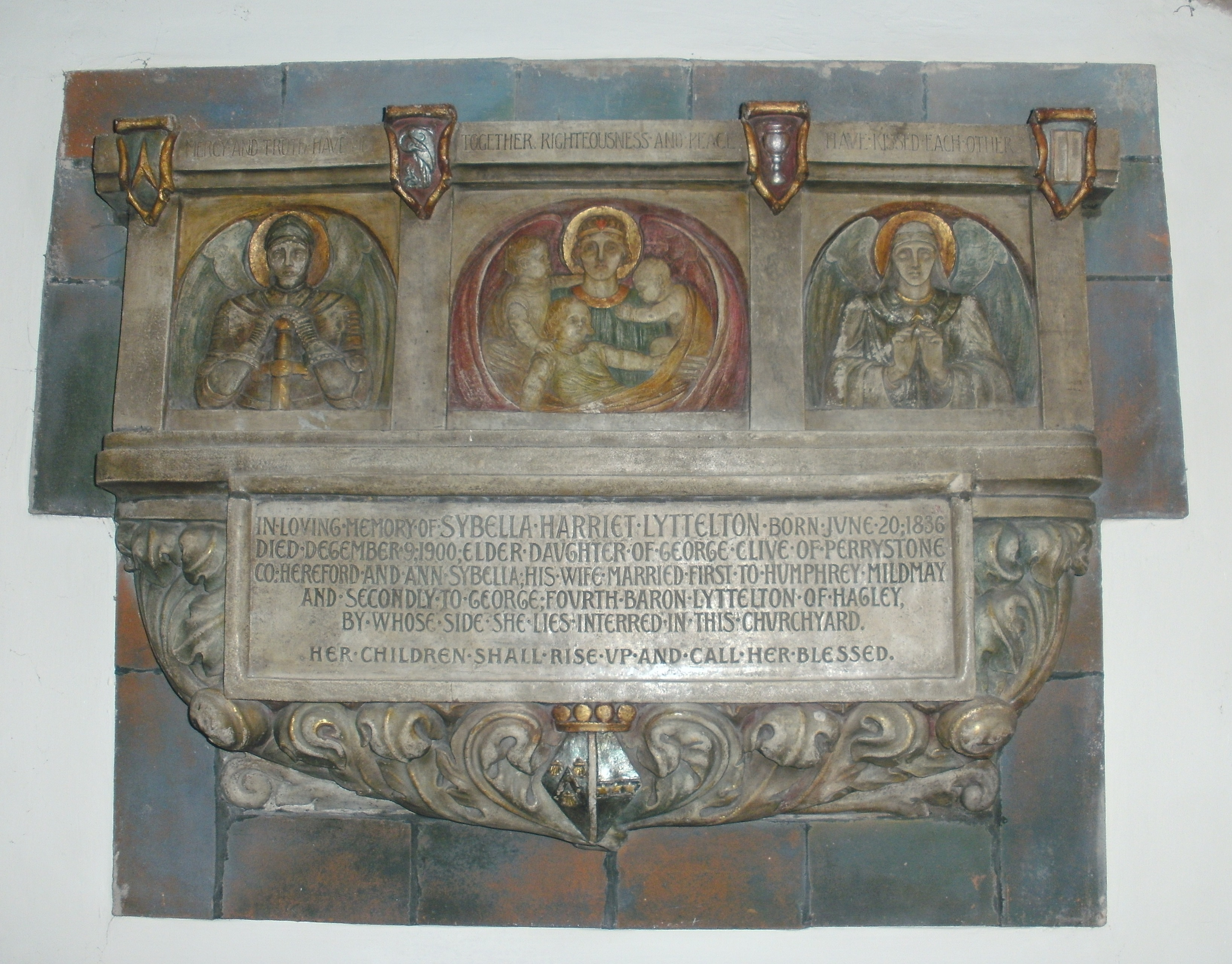
St John the Baptist Church, Hagley, memorial to Sybella Harriet Lyttelton (née Clive, 1836–1900)

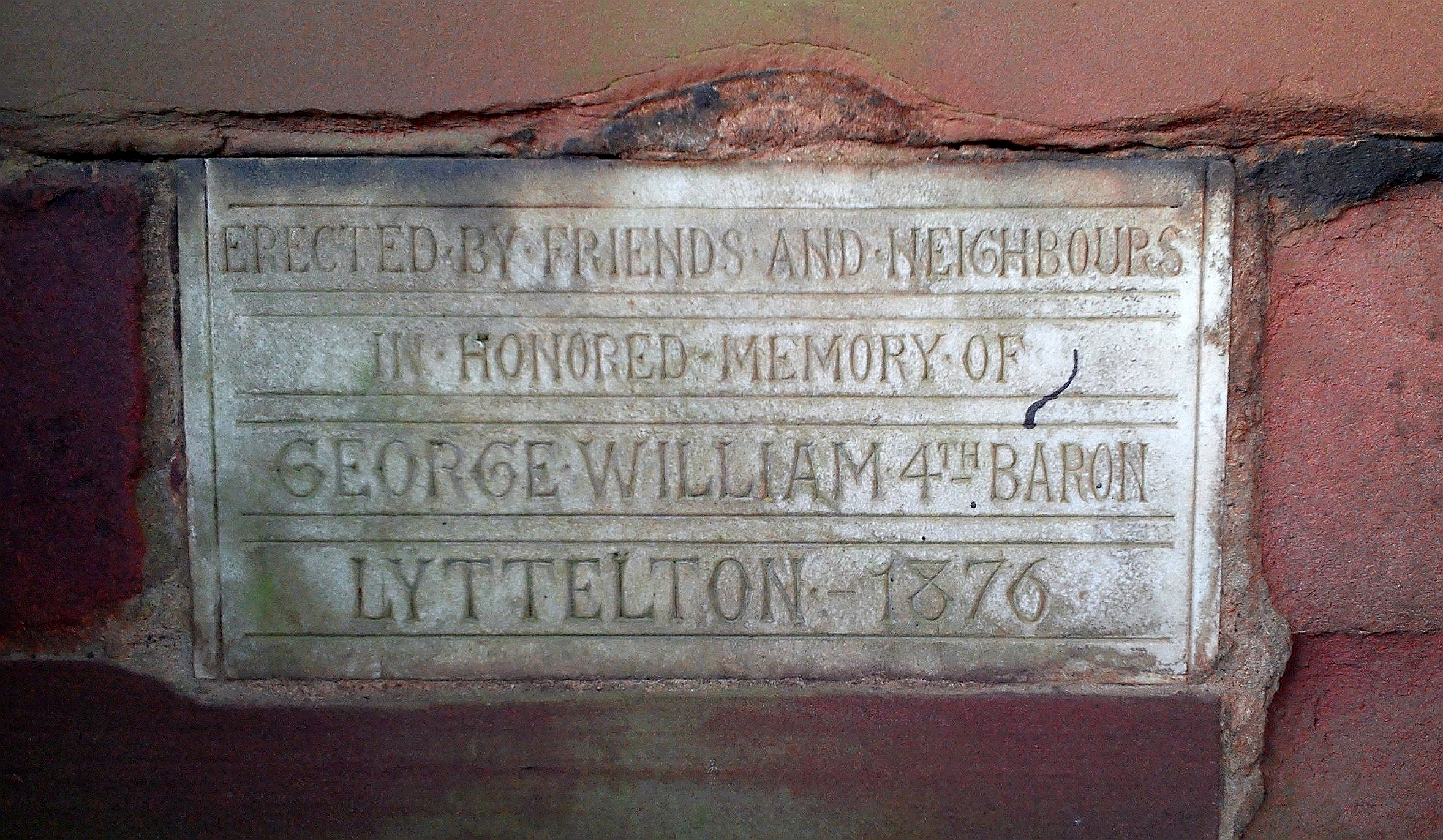
St John the Baptist Church, Hagley, inscription inside the lychgate

In 1876 Lyttelton killed himself at the age of 59 by throwing himself down the stairs in a London house. He was succeeded by his eldest son Charles, who later also inherited the viscounty of Cobham. Lady Lyttelton died in December 1900.

== Notes ==
Political offices
Preceded by George William Hope	Under-Secretary of State for War and the Colonies; 1846	Succeeded by Benjamin Hawes
Honorary titles
Preceded by The Lord Foley	Lord Lieutenant of Worcestershire; 1839–1876	Succeeded by The Earl Beauchamp
Peerage of Great Britain
Preceded by William Lyttelton	Baron Lyttelton; 1837–1876	Succeeded by Charles Lyttelton
Peerage of Ireland
Preceded by William Lyttelton	Baron Westcote; 1837–1876	Succeeded by Charles Lyttelton
