= Monster chess =

Chess variant

Position: a8 black rook, b8 black knight, c8 black bishop, d8 black queen, e8 black king, f8 black bishop, g8 black knight, h8 black rook, a7 black pawn, b7 black pawn, c7 black pawn, d7 black pawn, e7 black pawn, f7 black pawn, g7 black pawn, h7 black pawn, c2 white pawn, d2 white pawn, e2 white pawn, f2 white pawn, e1 white king

Monster chess. White King can move twice (king-type) moves per turn.

Monster chess—or Super King chess—is a chess variant in which the White side has only a king and four pawns to fight against all the pieces of the Black side. All the rules of chess apply, except that White makes two successive moves per turn. The white king can move into check on the first move of the turn and move out of check during the second move. The goal for both sides is to checkmate the opponent's king.

Monster chess can also be played with White starting with all eight pawns, or with only two. Alternatively, it can be played with colors reversed.

Queening a white pawn generally allows White to declare a checkmate within the next few moves. Also, with only the two kings on the board, White can easily force a Monster chess checkmate.

== Rules ==
- White must execute two moves in their turn. They can do this by moving a piece twice or two pieces once.
- The white king may move into check and then out of check, provided that White can execute two moves.
- If a king is in check, it must be placed out of check.
- Otherwise, standard chess rules apply.
- A king is in check if it could be captured on the next turn.
- The White King can capture the Black King by virtue of the above rules.

== Checkmating ==
Position: e8 black king, e6 white pawn, d4 white pawn, c2 black queen, h1 white king

In this position, White can play pawn d4-d5 and d5-d6. Although Black is not in check under the normal rules of chess, in Monster chess, White threatens d7+xe8, meaning Black is in check. There is no way for Black to avoid the mate threat (e.g. 1...Kf8 still leads to 2. e7+xf8), so the game is over by checkmate and White wins.

In Monster Chess, White checkmates Black when, no matter where Black moves, White will always be able to take Black's king by making two consecutive moves. For example, suppose White moves his pawn to a square that attacks the black king (where attacks means that if White makes two moves in a row, he will be able to take the black king). Black cannot respond by checking the white king with his queen in an attempt to escape mate. If Black did so, White could then respond by taking Black's king on his next move with his pawn before Black can take White's king with his queen.

Black needs a lot of material to checkmate the bare white king. In general, two queens suffice, as do queen and two rooks. Black king and queen versus the bare white king can be lost (when the white king can continually check until mate or a fork is achieved), or it can be drawn (if the queen is not on the edge, and her king is next to her and cannot be checked).

== See also ==
- Chess variant
- Grotesque (chess)
