= Charles Maurian =

American chess player

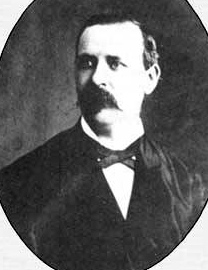

Personal information
- Full name: Charles Amédée de Maurian
- Born: May 21, 1838 New Orleans, Louisiana
- Died: December 2, 1912 (aged 74) Paris, France

Chess career
- Country: United States

Charles Amédée de Maurian (May 21, 1838 – December 2, 1912), also known as Charles Amédée Maurian, was an American amateur chess player and close personal friend of Paul Morphy.

== Biography ==
Maurian was born in New Orleans, Louisiana on May 21, 1838. He was of French descent. His father, Charles A. de Maurian, was a judge, and his mother was named Lasthenie Peychaud before her marriage. He was a classmate of Morphy at Spring Hill College in Mobile, Alabama, and the two remained close friends thereafter. Maurian never played in any public tournaments in his later chess career, but he did win first prize at the New Orleans Chess Club in 1858. Morphy taught Maurian how to play chess. Morphy originally gave Maurian knight odds in their games, and he continued to do so even after Maurian became too strong of a player for this to be necessary. Morphy and Maurian continued to play chess even after Morphy had otherwise essentially retired from play. Maurian edited a chess column in the New Orleans Delta newspaper from 1858 to 1860, and served as co-editor of the chess column in the New Orleans Times-Democrat for many years, beginning in 1883. When Morphy died in 1884, Maurian was one of the pall bearers at his funeral. Maurian moved to Paris, France in 1890, where he continued to live until his death on December 2, 1912.
