= Anthony Wirig =

French chess grandmaster (born 1983)

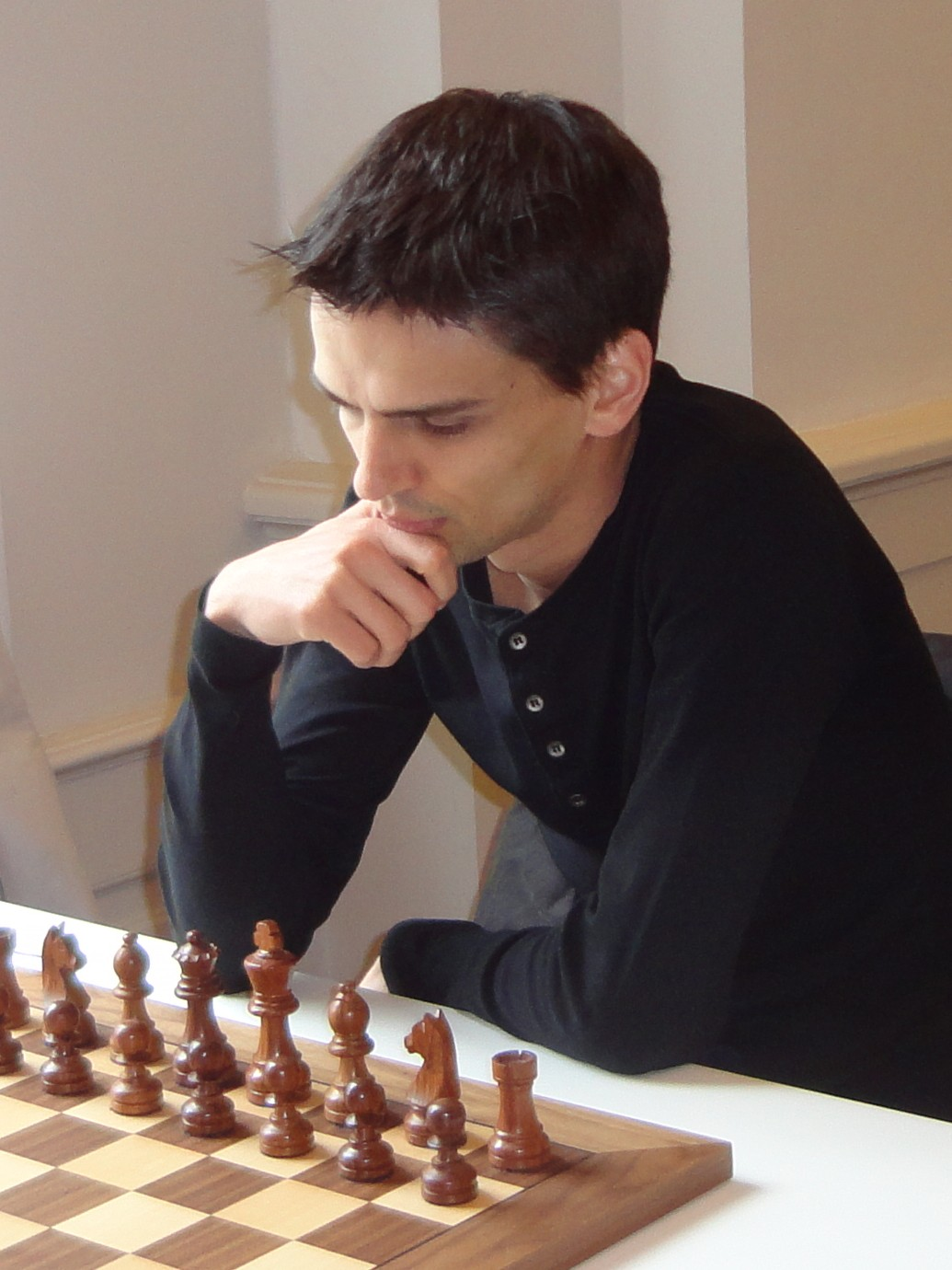
- Wirig in 2016

Personal information
- Born: February 3, 1983 (age 43) Thionville, France

Chess career
- Country: France
- Title: Grandmaster (2011)
- FIDE rating: 2408 (July 2026)
- Peak rating: 2520 (May 2022)

Anthony Wirig is a French chess grandmaster.

== Chess career ==
Wirig earned his GM norms at the:

- Cappelle la Grande Open Tournament in March 2007
- Metz International Tournament in April 2007
- European Individual Chess Championship in April 2011

In May 2016, he played in the Limburg Open, where he was defeated by Bob Beeke in the final round in a notable upset. He finished the tournament tied for 7th place, but was ranked in 12th.

In August 2023, he played in the French Chess Championships, where he drew and lost to eventual winner Yannick Gozzoli.
