= George William Spencer Lyttelton =

English civil servant (1847–1913)

The Honourable George William Spencer Lyttelton

Assistant Private Secretary to the Prime Minister
- In office 1873–1874
- Prime Minister: William Ewart Gladstone

Assistant Private Secretary to the Secretary of State
- In office 1880–1882
- Prime Minister: William Ewart Gladstone

Assistant Private Secretary to the Prime Minister
- In office 1882–1885
- Prime Minister: William Ewart Gladstone

Principal Private Secretary to the Prime Minister
- In office 1892–1894
- Prime Minister: William Ewart Gladstone

Personal details
- Born: 12 June 1847 Westminster, London, England
- Died: 5 December 1913 (aged 66) Westminster, London, England
- Parent(s): George Lyttelton, 4th Baron Lyttelton; Mary Glynne
- Education: Eton College; Trinity College, Cambridge

George William Spencer Lyttelton CB FRGS (12 June 1847 – 5 December 1913) was an English civil servant from the Lyttelton family who acted as private secretary to William Ewart Gladstone during three of his terms as Prime Minister of the United Kingdom. He was also one of eleven members of the Lyttelton family to play first-class cricket; primarily for Cambridge University during his time studying there.

== Early life and cricket career ==
George William Spencer Lyttelton was born in Westminster, London on 12 June 1847, the fourth son of George Lyttelton, 4th Baron Lyttelton and his first wife Mary Glynne. His father was a leading member of the Canterbury Association and Lyttelton Jr. accompanied him and Henry Selfe to a visit in Christchurch in New Zealand; they were in Canterbury from late January to early March 1868. Having studied at Eton College, he attended Trinity College, Cambridge, from which he graduated with a Bachelor of Arts (B.A.) in 1869 and received his Master of Arts (M.A.) in 1874. He played a number of cricket matches for Eton during his time at the school, including the annual fixture against Harrow in each of 1863, 1864 and 1865. In his first of these contests, he claimed four wickets in Harrow's only batting innings of a drawn match, and he scored a half-century in the second, but could not prevent Eton losing by an innings that year. In both of these contests, he played alongside his older brother Neville. In his final year at Eton, he was the captain of the cricket team. In the match against Harrow that year, in which Lyttelton claimed three wickets, his side once again lost by an innings.

He made his first-class debut during his first year at Cambridge; appearing against the Marylebone Cricket Club (MCC) in May 1866. He claimed a wicket in each innings, and scored 23 runs in his only appearance at the crease. Facing Cambridgeshire later that month, he took seven wickets in the first innings, conceding 33 runs; the best bowling figures of his career. He collected three further wickets in the second innings to complete the only ten wicket haul of his career. He received his blue that year by appearing in the match against Oxford. He made scores of one and three with the bat, and took three tail-end wickets in a match which Cambridge lost by 12 runs.

Despite his bowling achievements in 1866, in which he claimed 16 wickets for Cambridge at an average of 14.75, he was used as wicket-keeper for his first appearance in the subsequent year, taking five stumpings against the MCC. In the next match, against Southgate, he narrowly missed out on a century, having scored 99 runs in the first innings, but achieved the landmark score in the following game, against Cambridgeshire. Batting at number four, he scored 114 runs, almost half of his team's total for the first innings. The university won by eight wickets. The score remained the best of his career, resulting in both his highest total batting, and his best bowling figures, being against the same side: Cambridgeshire. He represented his university against Oxford for the second and final time in 1867, and though he claimed just one wicket and made scores of 17 and 20 not out, he was praised for his sensible batting in the second innings which helped his team win the match by five wickets.

In 1868, Lyttelton played five matches for Cambridge, but did not feature in the contest with Oxford. His batting average dropped significantly from the previous year's 37.88 to 13.57, and over half of his wickets for the season came in a match against Southgate. In that match he took five wickets for 17 runs in the second innings, the second five-wicket haul of his career. After leaving university, Lyttelton only played two further first-class matches, appearing for the amateur side "Gentlemen of England" against a university on each occasion.

Along with the majority of his family, he appeared a number of times for the "Gentlemen of Worcestershire", a fore-runner to Worcestershire County Cricket Club, for whom he made his debut in a match against the "Gentlemen of Warwickshire" shortly before entering Cambridge. Playing for the county in 1866, Lyttelton and his brother Charles took nine of Shropshire's first innings wickets, the other being a run out. In 1878, six years after his final first-class appearance, he scored 127 runs against the Free Foresters, his highest recorded batting total for the county. E. F. Benson described him as "grim and blunt and bearded and rich: he lived alone in a house in Hill Street into which no friend had ever penetrated. He was a bachelor, he sang in the Bach choir, and on being asked if had ever in his life kissed a woman he replied: "Once. On the brow."

== Later life ==
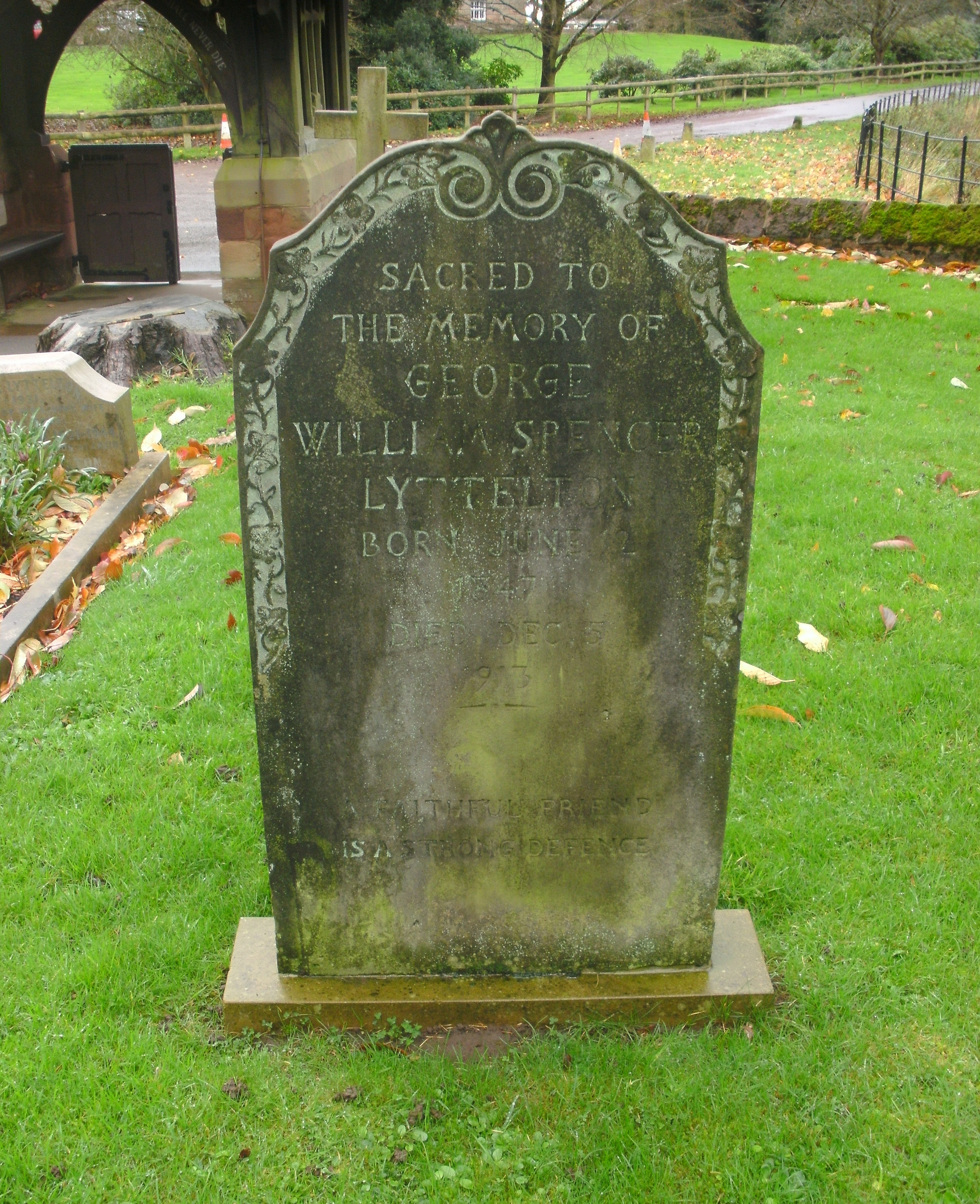
St John the Baptist Church, Hagley, grave of George William Spencer Lyttelton (1847–1913).

He was Assistant Private Secretary to the Prime Minister, William Ewart Gladstone, from 1871 to 1874, Assistant Private Secretary to the Secretary of State Earl Granville from 1880 to 1882, and once again Assistant Private Secretary to Gladstone from 1882 to 1885. In 1892, he was Gladstone's Principal Private Secretary. Lyttleton was one of several former private secretaries to Gladstone who attended at his funeral at Westminster Abbey on 28 May 1898. He was decorated for his service to the Prime Minister, being named a Companion of the Order of the Bath, and was also a Justice of the Peace for Worcestershire. He was a Fellow of the Royal Geographical Society, and was also on the executive committee of the Royal College of Music. He died, having never married, on 5 December 1913.
