= Hilda Chamberlain =

Political organizer and activist

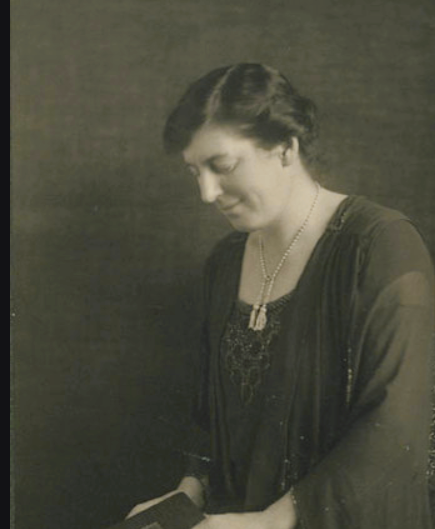
- Born: 16 May 1872; Edgbaston, Warwickshire, England
- Died: 28 December 1967 (aged 95); Odiham

Caroline "Hilda" Chamberlain (16 May 1872 – 28 December 1967) was a British political organiser and activist.

== Life ==
Chamberlain was born in 1872 in Edgbaston. Her parents were Florence (born Kenrick) and Joseph Chamberlain. Her father was a leading statesman who had been married before. Her mother died in childbirth in 1875 and her elder half sister Beatrice became her de facto parent.

She was educated at Marie Souvestre's Allenswood Boarding Academy together with her sisters, Ida and Ethel.

In 1914 her father died after being paralysed from a stroke for nearly eight years. During this period she and Ida had given up their own aspirations and social life to care for him, which may be the reason they did not marry.

He left £20,000 to each of his daughters. She and Ida bought the "Bury House" (now Grade two listed), which dated from the 1600s and had good transport links to London.

At the new house at Christmas 1914 they began to plan new works. Hilda was to get involved with creating parcels to go to prisoners of war.

At the end of the war some women were given the vote. Hilda became involved with Women's Institutes, where women could gather and discuss issues of importance. She used her Women's Institutes influence to help her sister Ida get elected to the Hampshire County Council. In 1935 she became the organisation's national treasurer.

She and her sister were well-informed and politically active. Their brothers Austen and Neville Chamberlain held all the major positions in the British government and both of them would send regular and informative letters. At one time they were both in the cabinet. She and Ida were concerned about the military threat posed by Hitler's rise to power in Germany and tried to influence Neville as prime minister. In 1939 war broke out and Neville soon resigned.

Her sister and housemate died at "The Bury" in Odiham in 1943. She survived her and died in her nineties, also at home in Odiham, in 1967. A stained glass window designed by Patrick Reyntiens in her memory called the 'Tree of Jesse' can be seen at All Saints church, Odiham.
