= Ida Chamberlain =

English political organizer and activist (1870–1943)

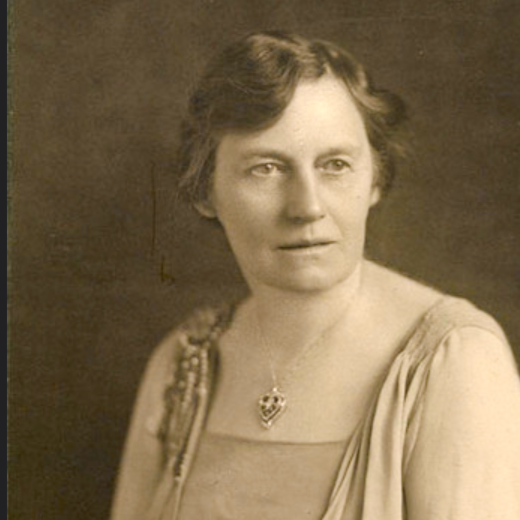
- in 1929 (photographer unknown)
- Born: Florence Ida Chamberlain; 22 May 1870; Edgbaston, Warwickshire, England
- Died: 1 April 1943 (aged 72); Odiham
- Education: Allenswood Boarding Academy
- Occupation(s): political organiser and activist
- Known for: first woman alderman in Hampshire
- Parent(s): Florence (born Kenrick) and Joseph Chamberlain

Florence "Ida" Chamberlain (22 May 1870 – 1 April 1943) was a British political organiser and activist in Birmingham. She moved to Hampshire, where she was a County Councillor and that county's first woman alderman.

== Life ==
Chamberlain was born in 1870 in Edgbaston. Her parents were Florence (born Kenrick) and Joseph Chamberlain. Her father was a leading statesman who had been married before. Her mother and namesake Florence died in childbirth in 1875 and her elder half-sister Beatrice became her de facto parent.

She was educated at Marie Souvestre's Allenswood Boarding Academy together with her younger sisters, Hilda and Ethel.

In 1911 she was involved in establishing a social service at Birmingham General Hospital in the form of an almoner, helping her elder brother Neville, who was chair of the hospital's house committee.

In 1914 her father died after being paralysed from a stroke for nearly eight years. During that time she and Hilda gave up their own aspirations and social life to care for him. He left £20,000 to each of his daughters; she and Hilda used the bequest to buy the Bury House (now Grade two listed), which dated from the 1600s and had good transport links to London.

At the new house at Christmas 1914 they began to plan new projects. Ida's initial work was to help her elder half sister Beatrice with assistance for the wounded.

In February 1918 she was elected to a public position as a councillor on Hartley Wintney Rural District Council. She had experience working for the Odiham branch of the Growers Co-operative Union, the French Wounded Emergency Fund in London and the Belgravia War Hospital Supply Depot. As a Harley Wintney councillor she led the housing committee.

In 1925 she was elected as a county councillor to the Hampshire County Council, where she took a special interest in both health and housing. This was useful to her brother Neville Chamberlain, who was leading the Ministry of Health, as county councils were a key part of his plans. He consulted with Ida and her sister Hilda.

In 1931 she became the first woman alderman of Hampshire. She and Hilda were concerned about the military threat posed by Hitler's rise to power in Germany and they tried to influence Neville as prime minister. In 1939 war broke out and Neville soon resigned. Ida turned her attention to helping with food supply as Britain's imports were impeded by German attacks on UK shipping.

Chamberlain died at "The Bury" in Odiham in 1943. Her sister survived her and died in her nineties at "The Bury".
