= Beatrice Chamberlain =

Educationist and political organizer

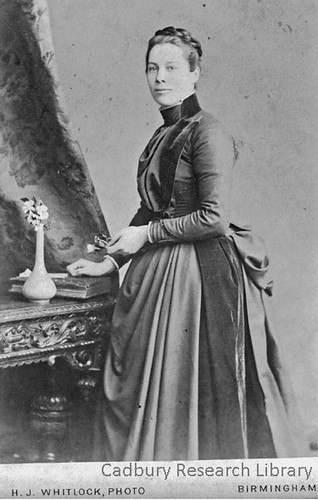
- Born: 25 May 1862; Edgbaston, England
- Died: 19 November 1918 (aged 56); Kensington, London, England
- Occupation(s): Educationalist, political organizer
- Parent(s): Joseph Chamberlain; Harriet Kenrick
- Relatives: Neville Chamberlain (brother); Austen Chamberlain (brother)

Beatrice Chamberlain (25 May 1862 – 19 November 1918) was a British educationalist and political organizer.

== Life ==
Chamberlain was born in Edgbaston in 1862. Her father was Joseph Chamberlain, a local industrialist who later became Mayor of Birmingham and a Cabinet minister and was, for roughly thirty years until he suffered a stroke in 1906, one of the most consequential figures in British politics. Her mother was Harriet Kenrick, the sister of William Kenrick MP. Beatrice was her parents' eldest child; the birth of her younger brother Austen Chamberlain took the life of her mother.

Beatrice was devoted to her aunt, Caroline Kenrick. Her early education was at Edgbaston High School for Girls. As a girl Beatrice dominated her shyer brother Austen.

Her father married again and had four children, but the birth of the fifth child took the life of his second wife, Florence, and the newborn in 1875. Beatrice took over as carer and governess to her half siblings: Neville, Ida, Hilda, and Ethel.

Beatrice continued her education in Fontainebleau at Les Ruches, a private school for girls. By 1888 she was back in Edgbaston, where she was able to give up the role of châtelaine to her father when he married for the third time. Beatrice was free to gather funds for the Children's Country Holidays Fund while she helped manage primary schools in Hammersmith and Fulham.

Her new stepmother, Mary, who was the daughter of William Crowninshield Endicott, Grover Cleveland's Secretary of War, introduced her to leading American politicians, including Theodore Roosevelt and William Howard Taft. Her brother Austen turned to Beatrice for support when he was the Chancellor of the Exchequer; she in turn served as an advocate for Austen with the wives of those who were opposing him.

Being fluent in French, she helped organise the French Wounded Emergency Fund at the start of World War I, coming shortly after her father died. Her fundraising for hospitals in France was so successful that she was asked to extend her efforts across the country.

She was also involved with preparations for peace, acting as an advisor to the Ministry for Reconstruction. Although she and all of her family had opposed giving the vote to women, and Chamberlain herself had been involved in creating women's anti-suffrage groups within the Unionist Party, she now accepted it as inevitable.

Chamberlain died in Kensington in 1918 in the flu pandemic. Her obituary noted that she had the "mind of a Great Man". Her siblings, including her half-sister Ethel, who died in 1905, had all admired her. Her brother, Austen, went on to win a Nobel Peace Prize, her half-brother Neville would be the Prime Minister who declared war on Germany, and her half-sisters all had long, notable lives.
