= Joseph Chamberlain =

British politician (1836–1914)

The Right Honourable Joseph Chamberlain
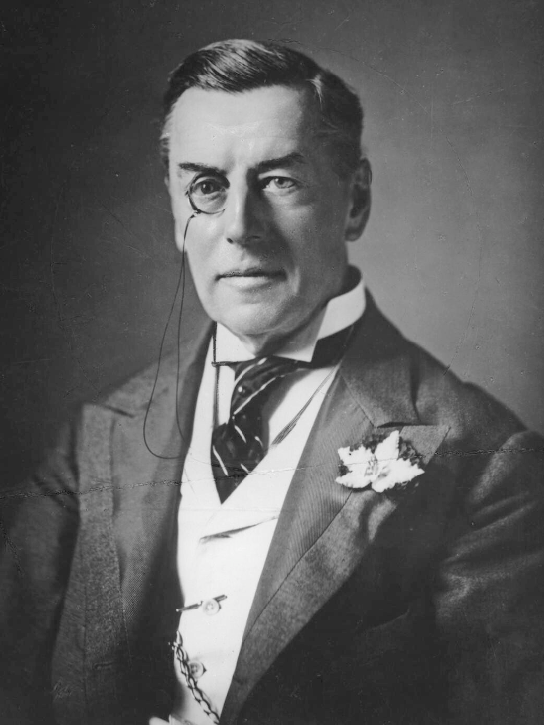

Secretary of State for the Colonies
- In office 29 June 1895 – 16 September 1903
- Prime Minister: Robert Gascoyne-Cecil, 3rd Marquess of Salisbury; Arthur Balfour
- Preceded by: George Robinson, 1st Marquess of Ripon
- Succeeded by: Alfred Lyttelton

Interim Leader of the Opposition
- In office 8 February 1906 – 27 February 1906
- Monarch: Edward VII
- Prime Minister: Sir Henry Campbell-Bannerman
- Preceded by: Arthur Balfour
- Succeeded by: Arthur Balfour

President of the Local Government Board
- In office 1 February 1886 – 3 April 1886
- Prime Minister: William Ewart Gladstone
- Preceded by: Arthur Balfour
- Succeeded by: James Stansfeld

President of the Board of Trade
- In office 3 May 1880 – 9 June 1885
- Prime Minister: William Ewart Gladstone
- Preceded by: Viscount Sandon
- Succeeded by: Charles Gordon-Lennox, 6th Duke of Richmond

Personal details
- Born: 8 July 1836 Camberwell, Surrey, England
- Died: 2 July 1914 (aged 77) London, England
- Resting place: Key Hill Cemetery, Birmingham
- Party: Liberal (1866–1886); Liberal Unionist (1886–1912); Conservative (1912–1914)
- Spouses: Harriet Kenrick (m. 1861; died 1863) Florence Kenrick (m. 1868; died 1875) Mary Endicott (m. 1888)
- Children: Beatrice; Austen; Neville; Ida; Hilda; Ethel
- Education: University College School
- Profession: Businessman
- Nicknames: "Our Joe"; "Joseph Africanus"

Joseph Chamberlain (8 July 1836 – 2 July 1914) was a British statesman who was first a radical Liberal, then a Liberal Unionist after opposing home rule for Ireland, and eventually was a leading imperialist in coalition with the Conservatives. He split both major British parties in the course of his career. He was the father, by different marriages, of Nobel Peace Prize winner Austen Chamberlain and of Prime Minister Neville Chamberlain.

Chamberlain made his career in Birmingham, first as a manufacturer of screws and then as a notable mayor of the city. He was a radical Liberal Party member and an opponent of the Elementary Education Act 1870 (33 & 34 Vict. c. 75) on the basis that it could result in subsidising Church of England schools with local ratepayers' money. As a businessman, he had never attended university and had contempt for the aristocracy. He entered the House of Commons at 39 years of age, relatively late in life compared to politicians from more privileged backgrounds. Rising to power through his influence with the Liberal grassroots organisation, he served as President of the Board of Trade in the Second Gladstone ministry (1880–85). At the time, Chamberlain was notable for his attacks on the Conservative leader Lord Salisbury, and in the 1885 general election he proposed the "Unauthorised Programme", which was not enacted, of benefits for newly enfranchised agricultural labourers, including the slogan promising "three acres and a cow". Chamberlain resigned from the Third Gladstone ministry in 1886 in opposition to Irish Home Rule. He helped to engineer a Liberal Party split and became a Liberal Unionist, a party which included a bloc of MPs based in and around Birmingham.

From the 1895 general election, the Liberal Unionists were in coalition with the Conservative Party, under Chamberlain's former opponent Lord Salisbury. In that government Chamberlain promoted the Workmen's Compensation Act 1897. He was Secretary of State for the Colonies, promoting a variety of schemes to build up the British Empire in Asia, Africa, and the West Indies. He had major responsibility for causing the Second Boer War (1899–1902) in South Africa and was the government minister most responsible for the war effort. He became a dominant figure in the Unionist Government's re-election at the "Khaki Election" in 1900. In 1903, he resigned from the Cabinet to campaign for tariff reform (i.e. taxes on imports as opposed to the existing policy of free trade with no tariffs). He obtained the support of most Unionist MPs for this stance, but the Unionists suffered a landslide defeat at the 1906 general election. Shortly after public celebrations of his 70th birthday in Birmingham, he was disabled by a stroke, ending his public career.

Although never prime minister, Chamberlain was one of the most important British politicians of his day, as well as a renowned orator and municipal reformer. Historian David Nicholls observes that his personality was not attractive, as he was arrogant and ruthless and much hated. He never succeeded in his grand ambitions but was a highly proficient grassroots organiser of democratic instincts. He is most famous for setting the agenda of British colonial, foreign, tariff, and municipal policies, and for deeply splitting both major political parties. In his Great Contemporaries, future Prime Minister Winston Churchill remarked that despite never being prime minister, Chamberlain "made the [political] weather".

== Early life, business career, and family life ==
Chamberlain was born on Camberwell Grove in Camberwell, South London, to Joseph Chamberlain (1796–1874), a successful shoe manufacturer, and Caroline (1806–1875), daughter of cheese (formerly beer) merchant Henry Harben. His younger brother was Richard Chamberlain, later also a Liberal politician. Raised at Highbury, a prosperous suburb of North London, he was educated at University College School 1850–1852, excelling academically and gaining prizes in French and mathematics.

The elder Chamberlain was not able to provide advanced education for all his children, and at the age of 16 Joseph was apprenticed to the Worshipful Company of Cordwainers and worked for the family business (their warehouse having been at Milk Street, London, for three generations) making quality leather shoes. At 18 he joined his uncle's screw-making business, Nettlefolds of Birmingham, in which his father had invested. The company became known as Nettlefold and Chamberlain when Chamberlain became a partner with Joseph Nettlefold. During the business's most prosperous period it produced two-thirds of all metal screws made in England, and by the time of Chamberlain's retirement from business in 1874 it was exporting worldwide.

In 1859, with the Volunteer movement in full swing, Chamberlain attempted to raise a Volunteer Rifle Company in Birmingham from the Edgbaston Debating Society, but his offer was not accepted by the County.

=== Marriages and children ===
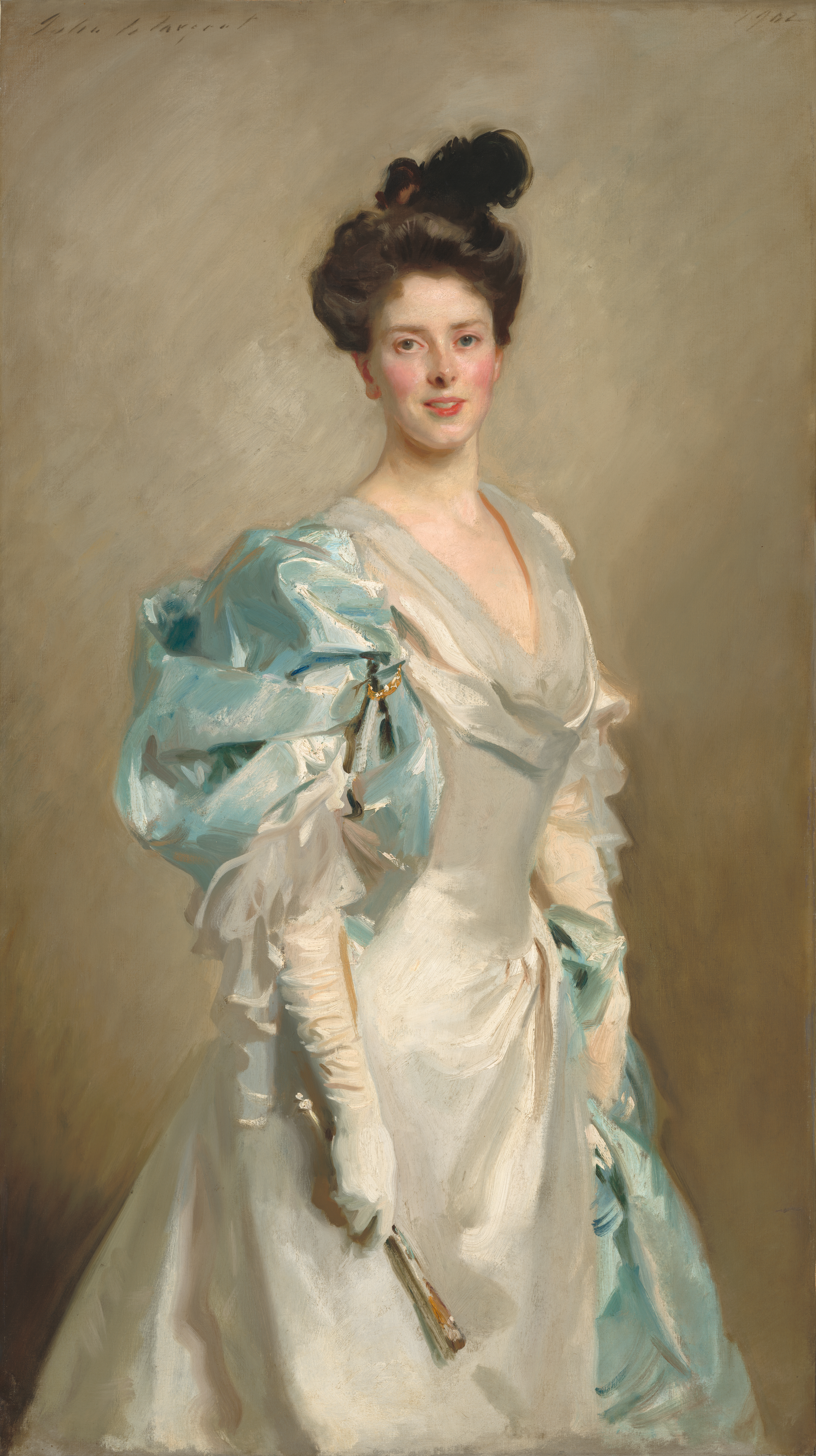
Chamberlain's third wife, Mary, by John Singer Sargent, 1902

In July 1861 Chamberlain married Harriet Kenrick, the daughter of holloware manufacturer Archibald Kenrick, of Berrow Court, Edgbaston, Birmingham; they had met the previous year. Their daughter, Beatrice Chamberlain, was born in May 1862. Harriet, who had had a premonition that she would die in childbirth, became ill two days after the birth of their son, Austen, in October 1863, and died three days later. Chamberlain devoted himself to business while the children were brought up by their maternal grandparents.

In 1868 Chamberlain married Harriet's cousin Florence Kenrick, daughter of Timothy Kenrick.

Chamberlain and Florence had four children: the future Prime Minister Neville in 1869, Ida in 1870, Hilda in 1871 and Ethel in 1873. The teaching of these four children was taken on by their elder half sister, Beatrice, who was destined to make her mark as an educationalist. On 13 February 1875 Florence gave birth to their fifth child, but she and the child died within a day. Though a Unitarian during his lifetime, the experiences Chamberlain endured with losing both wives in childbirth resulted in him losing personal faith, rejecting religious creeds and not requiring religious adherence of any of his children.

Chamberlain met his third wife, Mary Crowninshield Endicott, the 23-year-old daughter of United States Secretary of War William Crowninshield Endicott, while leading a British delegation to Washington, D.C., to resolve the Newfoundland fisheries dispute in 1887. He described her as "one of the brightest and most intelligent girls I have yet met." Before he left the United States in March 1888, Chamberlain proposed, and they married at St John's Episcopal Church in New York City, wearing white violets rather than Chamberlain's trademark orchid. Mary became a faithful supporter of his political ambitions and eased his acceptance into upper-class society in the second half of his career. They had no children. She survived Chamberlain, to later marry, in 1916, Anglican clergyman William Hartley Carnegie (1859–1936).

== Early political career ==
=== Calls for reform ===
Chamberlain became involved in Liberal politics, influenced by the strong radical and liberal traditions among Birmingham shoemakers and the long tradition of social action in Chamberlain's Unitarian church. There was pressure to redistribute parliamentary seats to cities and to enfranchise a greater proportion of urban men. In 1866, Earl Russell's Liberal administration submitted a Reform Bill to create 400,000 new voters, but the bill was opposed by the "Adullamite" Liberals for disrupting the social order, and criticised by Radicals for not conceding the secret ballot or household suffrage. The bill was defeated and the government fell. Chamberlain was one of the 250,000, including the mayor, who marched for Reform in Birmingham on 27 August 1866; he recalled that "men poured into the hall, black as they were from the factories...the people were packed together like herrings" to listen to a speech by John Bright. Lord Derby's minority Conservative administration passed a Reform Act in 1867, nearly doubling the electorate from 1,430,000 to 2,470,000.

The Liberal Party won the 1868 election. Chamberlain was active in the election campaign, praising Bright and George Dixon, a Birmingham MP. Chamberlain was also influential in the local campaign in support of the Irish Disestablishment bill. In the autumn of 1869, a deputation headed by William Harris invited him to stand for the Town Council; and in November he was elected to represent St Paul's Ward.

Chamberlain and Jesse Collings had been among the founders of the Birmingham Education League in 1867, which noted that of about 4.25 million children of school age, 2 million children, mostly in urban areas, did not attend school, with a further 1 million in uninspected schools. The government's aid to Church of England schools offended Nonconformist opinion. Chamberlain favoured free, secular, compulsory education, stating that "it is as much the duty of the State to see that the children are educated as to see that they are fed", and attributing the success of the US and Prussia to public education. The Birmingham Education League evolved into the National Education League, which held its first Conference in Birmingham in 1869 and proposed a school system funded by local rates and government grants, managed by local authorities subject to government inspection. By 1870, the League had more than one hundred branches, mostly in cities and peopled largely by men of trades unions and working men's organisations.

William Edward Forster, vice-president of the Committee of Council on Education, proposed an Elementary Education Bill in January 1870. Nonconformists opposed the proposal to fund church schools as part of the national educational system through the rates. The NEL was angered by the absence of school commissions or of free, compulsory education. Chamberlain arranged for a delegation of 400 branch members and 46 MPs to visit the prime minister William Ewart Gladstone at 10 Downing Street on 9 March 1870, the first time the two men had met. Chamberlain impressed the Prime Minister with his lucid speech, and during the bill's second reading Gladstone agreed to make amendments that removed church schools from rate-payer control and granted them funding. Liberal MPs, exasperated at the compromises in the legislation, voted against the government, and the bill passed the House of Commons with support from the Conservatives. Chamberlain campaigned against the Act, and especially Clause 25, which gave school boards of England and Wales the power to pay the fees of poor children at voluntary schools, theoretically allowing them to fund church schools. The Education League stood in several by-elections against Liberal candidates who refused to support the repeal of Clause 25. In 1873, a Liberal majority was elected to the Birmingham School Board, with Chamberlain as chairman. Eventually, a compromise was reached with the church component of the school board agreeing to make payments from rate-payer's money only to schools associated with industrial education.

Chamberlain espoused enfranchisement of rural workers and a lower cost of land. In an article written for the Fortnightly Review, he coined the slogan of the "Four F's: Free Church, Free Schools, Free Land and Free Labour". In another article, "The Liberal Party and its Leaders", Chamberlain criticised Gladstone's leadership and advocated a more Radical direction for the party.

=== Mayor of Birmingham ===
In November 1873 the Liberal Party swept the municipal elections and Chamberlain was elected mayor of Birmingham. The Conservatives had denounced his Radicalism and called him a "monopoliser and a dictator" while the Liberals had campaigned against their High church Tory opponents with the slogan "The People above the Priests". The city's municipal administration was notably lax with regards to public works and many urban dwellers lived in conditions of great poverty. As mayor, Chamberlain promoted many civic improvements, promising the city would be "parked, paved, assized, marketed, gas & watered and 'improved'".

The Birmingham Gas Light and Coke Company and the Birmingham and Staffordshire Gas Light Company were locked in constant competition, in which the city's streets were continually dug up to lay mains. Chamberlain forcibly purchased the two companies on behalf of the borough for £1,953,050, even offering to purchase the companies himself if the ratepayers refused. In its first year of operations the new municipal gas scheme made a profit of £34,000.

The city's water supply was considered a danger to public health – approximately half of the city's population was dependent on well water, much of which was polluted by sewage. Piped water was supplied on only three days per week, compelling the use of well water and water carts for the rest of the week. Deploring the rising death rate from contagious diseases in the poorest parts of the city, in January 1876 Chamberlain forcibly purchased Birmingham's waterworks for a combined sum of £1,350,000, creating Birmingham Corporation Water Department, having declared to a House of Commons Committee that "We have not the slightest intention of making profit... We shall get our profit indirectly in the comfort of the town and in the health of the inhabitants.” Despite this noticeable executive action, Chamberlain was mistrustful of central authority and bureaucracy, preferring to give local communities the responsibility to act on their own initiative.

In July 1875 Chamberlain tabled an improvement plan involving slum clearance in Birmingham's city centre. Chamberlain had been consulted by the Home Secretary, Richard Assheton Cross, during the preparation of the Artisans' and Labourers' Dwellings Improvement Act 1875, during Disraeli's social improvement programme. Chamberlain bought 50 acres (200,000 m^{2}) of property to build a new road, (Corporation Street), through Birmingham's overcrowded slums. Overriding the protests of local landlords and the commissioner of the Local Government Board's inquiry into the scheme, Chamberlain gained the endorsement of the President of the Local Government Board, George Sclater-Booth. Chamberlain raised the funds for the programme, contributing £10,000 himself. However the Improvement Committee concluded that it would be too expensive to transfer slum-dwellers to municipally built accommodation, and so the land was leased as a business proposition on a 75-year lease. Slum dwellers were eventually rehoused in the suburbs and the scheme cost local government £300,000. The death rate in Corporation Street decreased dramatically – from approximately 53 per 1,000 between 1873 and 1875 to 21 per 1,000 between 1879 and 1881.

During Chamberlain's tenure of office, public and private money was used to construct libraries, municipal swimming pools and schools. Birmingham Museum & Art Gallery was enlarged and a number of new parks were opened. Construction of the Council House was begun, while the Victoria Law Courts were built on Corporation Street.

The mayoralty helped make Chamberlain a national as well as local figure, with contemporaries commenting upon his youthfulness and dress, including "a black velvet coat, jaunty eyeglass in eye, red neck-tie drawn through a ring". His contribution to the city's improvement earned Chamberlain the allegiance of the so-called Birmingham caucus for the rest of his public career.

His biographer states:

Early in his political career, Chamberlain constructed arguably his greatest and most enduring accomplishment, a model of "gas-and-water" or municipal socialism widely admired in the industrial world. At his ceaseless urging, Birmingham embarked on an improvement scheme to tear down its central slums and replace them with healthy housing and commercial thoroughfares, both to ventilate the town and to attract business. This scheme, however, strained the financial resources of the town and undermined the consensus in favour of reform.

== National politics ==
=== Parliament and National Liberal Federation: 1876–80 ===
Chamberlain was invited to stand for election as an MP by the Sheffield Reform Association, an offshoot of the Liberal Party in the city, soon after starting as mayor. Chamberlain's first Parliamentary campaign in 1874 was a fierce one; opponents accused him of republicanism and atheism and even threw dead cats at him on the speaking platform. Chamberlain came in third—a poor result for a leading urban Radical—and rejected the possibility of standing in Sheffield again. Instead, he stood unopposed for a Birmingham constituency by-election in 1876, after George Dixon resigned. Following his nomination, Chamberlain denounced Prime Minister Benjamin Disraeli as "a man who never told the truth except by accident." After Chamberlain came under heavy attack for the insult, creating anxiety for the Liberals, he apologised publicly. Upon his election, Chamberlain resigned as mayor and was introduced to the House of Commons by John Bright and Joseph Cowen. On 4 August 1876, Chamberlain made his maiden speech during a debate on elementary schools, using his experience on the Birmingham School Board. He spoke for twenty minutes on the maintenance of clause 25 with Disraeli present.

Almost immediately upon entry to the House of Commons, Chamberlain began to organise the Radical MPs into a coherent parliamentary group, with the intent to displace Whig dominance of the Liberal Party. Early difficulties within Parliament led Chamberlain to favor a grassroots approach instead, organising local chapters as the foundation of an effective national movement.

To gain footing for the Radicals, Chamberlain sought to close ranks with Gladstone to profit from the leader's increasing popularity and harness popular opposition to Disraeli's aggressive foreign policy, beginning with outrage over Ottoman atrocities in Bulgaria and the resulting Russo-Turkish War. Chamberlain joined Gladstone in arguing Disraeli's policy diverted attention from domestic reform, but unlike many Liberals, Chamberlain was not an anti-imperialist; although he berated the government for its Eastern policy, the Second Afghan War, and the Anglo-Zulu War, he supported Disraeli's purchase of Suez Canal Company shares in November 1875. At this stage of his career, Chamberlain was eager to see the protection of British overseas interests but placed greater emphasis on a conception of justice in the pursuit of such interests.

On 31 May 1877, the National Liberal Federation (NLF) was founded at Bingley Hall, with Gladstone offering the inaugural address, Chamberlain as its president, and Birmingham politicians playing a dominant part in its organisation. The NLF enhanced Chamberlain's party influence and gave him a national platform. Through the NLF, Chamberlain tightened party discipline and campaigning, enlisted new party members, organised political meetings and published posters and pamphlets. Contemporary commentators drew often-disparaging comparisons between the Federation and the techniques of American political machines, with Chamberlain serving the role of a political boss. Chamberlain joined the Liberal denunciations of the government's foreign policy in the 1880 general election, and Gladstone returned as prime minister.

=== President of the Board of Trade: 1880–85 ===
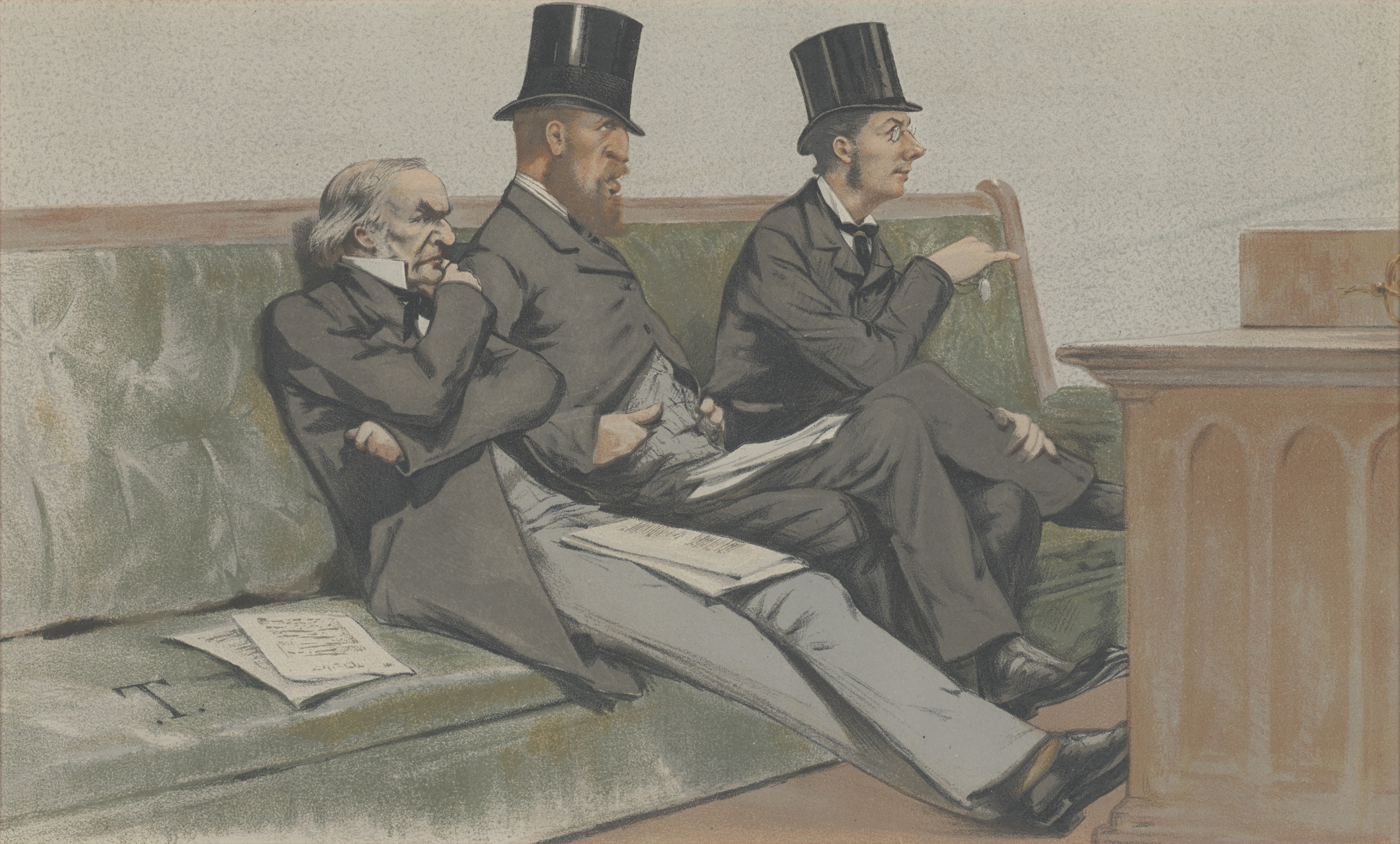
William Ewart Gladstone, Lord Hartington, and Chamberlain as depicted in Vanity Fair, 6 July 1880

Despite having sat in Parliament for only four years, Chamberlain hoped for a Cabinet position, and told Sir William Harcourt that he was prepared to lead a revolt and field Radical candidates in borough elections. Although Gladstone did not hold the NLF in high regard, he was eager to reconcile Chamberlain and other Radicals to the mainly Whig cabinet, and he invited Chamberlain to become President of the Board of Trade on 27 April 1880.

After his success in municipal politics, Chamberlain was frustrated at his inability to introduce more creative legislation at the Board of Trade. Between 1880 and 1883, the government was preoccupied with Ireland, the Transvaal, and Egypt. Chamberlain introduced bills for the safer transportation of grain, for enabling municipal corporations to establish electricity supplies, and for ensuring a fairer system of payment for seamen. After 1883, Chamberlain was more productive and expanded the scope of his authority; he introduced bills establishing a Board of Trade Bankruptcy Department for inquiring into failed business deals and subjecting patents to Board of Trade supervision. Chamberlain also sought to end the practice of over-insuring coffin ships, but despite endorsements by Tory Democrats Lord Randolph Churchill and John Eldon Gorst, the government was unwilling to grant Chamberlain its full support and the Bill was withdrawn in July 1884.

==== Ireland ====
As President of the Board of Trade, Chamberlain took a special interest in Ireland. Chamberlain strongly opposed the Irish Home Rule movement on the belief that home rule would lead to the eventual break-up of the empire; he declared, "I cannot admit that five millions of Irishmen have any greater right to govern themselves without regard to the rest of the United Kingdom than the five million inhabitants of the metropolis". In an effort to quiet agitation in Ireland through appeasement, Chamberlain supported calls for a Land Bill and opposed Chief Secretary William Edward Forster's tactics of lethal force and mass imprisonment. In April 1881, Gladstone's government introduced the Irish Land Act, but Charles Stewart Parnell encouraged tenants to withhold rents. As a result, Parnell and other leaders were imprisoned in Kilmainham Gaol on 13 October 1881.

Chamberlain supported the imprisonment and used it to bargain the informal Kilmainham Treaty in 1882. Under the informal agreement, the government released Parnell in return for his co-operation in implementing the Land Act. Forster resigned, but his successor, Lord Frederick Cavendish, was murdered by members of the Irish National Invincibles on 6 May 1882, leaving the treaty almost useless. Many, including Parnell, believed that Chamberlain would be offered the Chief Secretaryship, but Gladstone appointed Sir George Otto Trevelyan instead. Nevertheless, Chamberlain maintained an interest in Irish affairs and proposed to the Cabinet an Irish Central Board that would have legislative powers for land, education and communications, which was rejected by the Whigs in Cabinet on 9 May 1885.

==== Electoral reform ====
Early in the Gladstone ministry, Chamberlain unsuccessfully suggested the extension of the franchise; the Prime Minister deferred until 1884, when the Liberals proposed a Third Reform Bill which gave the vote to hundreds of thousands of rural labourers. Chamberlain and the Radicals campaigned to capture the new voters with public meetings, speeches and articles written in the Fortnightly Review. The Representation of the People Act 1884 was followed by the Redistribution of Seats Act 1885, negotiated by Gladstone and Conservative leader Lord Salisbury.

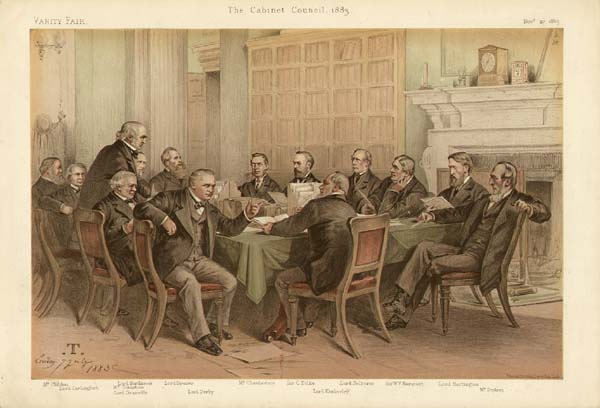
The Gladstone cabinet as depicted in Vanity Fair, 27 November 1883

During debate on the 1884 County Franchise Bill, Chamberlain famously declared that Salisbury was "himself the spokesman of a class — a class to which he himself belongs — who toil not neither do they spin." In response, Salisbury branded Chamberlain a "Sicilian bandit" and Stafford Northcote called him "Jack Cade". When Chamberlain suggested that he would march on London with thousands of Birmingham constituents to protest against the House of Lords' powers, Salisbury remarked that "Mr. Chamberlain will return from his adventure with a broken head if nothing worse."

==== 1885 election ====
In 1885, Chamberlain sought to "utterly destroy the Whigs, and have a Radical government before many years are out." To that end, Chamberlain and Sir Charles Dilke privately presented their resignations to Gladstone on 20 May, after the Cabinet had rejected Chamberlain's proposed Irish plan and his scheme for the creation of National Councils in England, Scotland, and Wales. The resignations were not made public, but the opportunity came for Chamberlain to present his Radicalism to the country after the Gladstone budget failed on 8 June, triggering a new general election with a dramatically expanded, redistributed electorate.

In July 1885, Chamberlain wrote the preface to the Radical Programme, the first campaign handbook in British political history. It endorsed land reform, more direct taxation, free public education, the disestablishment of the Church of England, universal male suffrage, and greater protection for trade unions. Chamberlain drew inspiration from his friend Frederick Maxse's 1873 pamphlet The Causes of Social Revolt. Chamberlain's proposal to separate free education for every child from the religious question was rejected by groups on all sides, including the NLF, Nonconformists, Catholics and more generally, taxpayers. The Programme earned the scorn of Whig Liberals and Conservatives alike.

Chamberlain began his election campaign at Hull on 5 August, in front of large posters declaring him to be "your coming Prime Minister." Until the campaign's end in October, he denounced opponents of the Programme and used the slogan "Three Acres and a Cow" to endorse the cause of the rural labourers, offering to make smallholdings available to them by using funds from local authorities. Chamberlain's campaign attracted large crowds and enthralled the young Ramsay MacDonald and David Lloyd George, but disturbed leading Liberals like George Goschen, who called it the "Unauthorised Programme". The Conservatives denounced Chamberlain as an anarchist, with some even comparing him to Dick Turpin.

In October 1885, as the campaign came to a close, Chamberlain visited Gladstone at Hawarden Castle to reconcile their respective electoral programmes. The meeting, although good-natured, was largely unproductive, and Gladstone neglected to tell Chamberlain of his ongoing negotiations with Parnell over Irish Home Rule. Chamberlain was informed their existence by Henry Labouchere, but, did not press the issue, unsure of the precise nature of Gladstone's offer.

The Liberals won a plurality in November 1885 but fell just short of a majority against the Conservatives. The Irish Nationalists held the balance of power between the two parties.

==== Liberal split ====
On 17 December, Herbert Gladstone revealed that his father, needing Nationalist support, was prepared to implement Home Rule. At first, Chamberlain was reluctant to anger his Radical followers by joining forces with the anti-Home Rule Whigs and Conservatives. While saying little about the topic publicly, Chamberlain privately damned Gladstone and Home Rule to colleagues, believing that maintaining the Conservatives in power for a further year would make the Irish question easier to settle.

Chamberlain declined Gladstone's offer of the office of First Lord of the Admiralty; Gladstone in turn rejected Chamberlain's request for the Colonial Office and eventually appointed him President of the Local Government Board. Their personal relationship worsened after a dispute over the amount to be paid to Collings, Chamberlain's Parliamentary Secretary, although Chamberlain still hoped that he could alter or block Gladstone's Home Rule proposal in Cabinet and renew his scheme for National Councils, but the topic was never discussed.

On 13 March 1886, Gladstone's proposals for Ireland were revealed. Chamberlain argued that the details of the accompanying Land Purchase Bill should be made known in order for a fair judgment on Home Rule. When Gladstone stated his intention to give Ireland a separate Parliament with full powers to deal with Irish affairs, Chamberlain resolved to resign and wrote to inform Gladstone of his decision two days later. In the meantime, Chamberlain consulted with Arthur Balfour over the possibility of concerted action with the Conservatives and contemplated similar co-operation with the Whigs. His resignation was made public on 27 March 1886.

=== Liberal Unionist: 1886–93 ===
Immediately after his resignation from Cabinet, Chamberlain launched a ferocious campaign against Gladstone's Irish proposals. His motivations combined imperial, domestic, and personal themes: imperial because the proposal threatened to weaken Parliament's control over the United Kingdom, domestic because they downplayed the Radical programme, and personal because they weakened his own standing in the party.

On 9 April, Chamberlain spoke against the Irish Home Rule Bill in its first reading. Chamberlain's chances of displacing Gladstone as party leader declined dramatically and in early May, the National Liberal Federation declared its loyalty to Gladstone. On 14 May, Chamberlain attended a meeting of Liberal Unionists, from which arose the Liberal Unionist Association, an ad hoc alliance to demonstrate the unity of anti-Home Rulers. Meanwhile, to distinguish himself from the Whigs, Chamberlain founded the National Radical Union to rival the NLF. During its second reading on 8 June, the Home Rule Bill was defeated by the combined opposition of Chamberlain radicals, Conservatives, and Whigs. In all, 93 Liberals voted against Gladstone.

==== 1886 election and Unionist government ====
Parliament was dissolved, and in the July 1886 general election, the Conservatives and Liberal Unionists, led by Lord Salisbury and Lord Hartington, agreed to an alliance. Chamberlain's position in the alliance was awkward; unlike Hartington, he was intensely mistrusted by and unable to influence the Conservatives, and he was also despised by the Gladstonians. Gladstone himself observed, "There is a difference between Hartington and Chamberlain, that the first behaves like and is a thorough gentleman. Of the other, it is better not to speak." The general election was dominated by Home Rule, and Chamberlain's campaign was both Radical and intensely patriotic. The Unionist alliance took 393 seats in the House of Commons and a comfortable majority.

Chamberlain did not enter the Unionist government, aware of Conservative hostility and not wishing to alienate his Radical base. The Liberal mainstream cast Chamberlain as a villain, shouting "Judas!" and "Traitor!" as he entered the House of Commons. Unable to associate decisively with either party, Chamberlain sought concerted action with a kindred spirit from the Conservative Party, Chancellor of the Exchequer Lord Randolph Churchill. In November 1886, Churchill announced his own programme at Dartford, borrowing much from Chamberlain's, including smallholdings for rural labourers and greater local government. The next month, Churchill resigned as Chancellor over military spending; when the Conservative mainstream rallied around Salisbury, Churchill's career was effectively ended, and so too was Chamberlain's hope of creating a powerful cross-party alliance of Radicals. The appointment of George Goschen to succeed Churchill isolated Chamberlain further and symbolised the strong relationship between non-Radical Liberal Unionists and the Conservatives.

In January 1887, Chamberlain, Trevelyan, Harcourt, John Morley and Lord Herschell participated in a series of Round Table Conferences to resolve the Liberal Party's Irish policy. Chamberlain hoped an accord would enable him to claim the Liberal leadership and influence over the Conservatives. Although a preliminary agreement was made concerning land purchase, Gladstone was unwilling to compromise further, and negotiations ended by March. In August 1887, Lord Salisbury invited Chamberlain to lead the British delegation to resolve a fisheries dispute between the United States and Newfoundland. The visit to the United States renewed his enthusiasm for politics and enhanced his standing with respect to Gladstone.

Upon his return to Britain, Chamberlain and Radicalism experienced new political success. He extracted his supporters from the Liberal Party and created the Liberal Unionist Association in 1888, associated with his National Radical Union. The Salisbury ministry implemented a number of Radical reforms as well. Between 1888 and 1889, democratic County councils were established. By 1891, measures for the provision of smallholdings had been made, and the free, compulsory education was extended to the entire country. Chamberlain wrote, "I have in the last five years seen more progress made with the practical application of my political programme than in all my previous life. I owe this result entirely to my former opponents, and all the opposition has come from my former friends."

==== 1892 election and return to minority ====
In the 1892 general election, Gladstone returned to power with a Liberal-Irish Nationalist coalition. The Liberal Unionists did well in Birmingham and made gains in the neighbouring Black Country, and Chamberlain's son Austen entered the House of Commons unopposed for East Worcestershire. However, the Liberal Unionists were reduced to 47 seats, falling behind in an age of well-organized mass national politics, and Chamberlain's standing was accordingly weakened. Gladstone made no effort to reunite with Chamberlain, and the Liberal Unionists drew closer to the Conservatives. When Hartington took his seat in the House of Lords as the Duke of Devonshire, Chamberlain assumed leadership of the Liberal Unionists in the House of Commons, beginning a productive relationship with Arthur Balfour, Conservative leader in the Commons.

Gladstone introduced a Second Home Rule Bill in February 1893. Although the Bill passed the House of Commons, the Lords rejected Home Rule by a huge margin. With his party divided, Gladstone prepared to dissolve Parliament on the issue of the House of Lords' veto, but was compelled to resign in March 1894 by his colleagues. He was replaced by Lord Rosebery, who neglected the topic of Home Rule. Chamberlain continued to form alliances with the Conservatives.

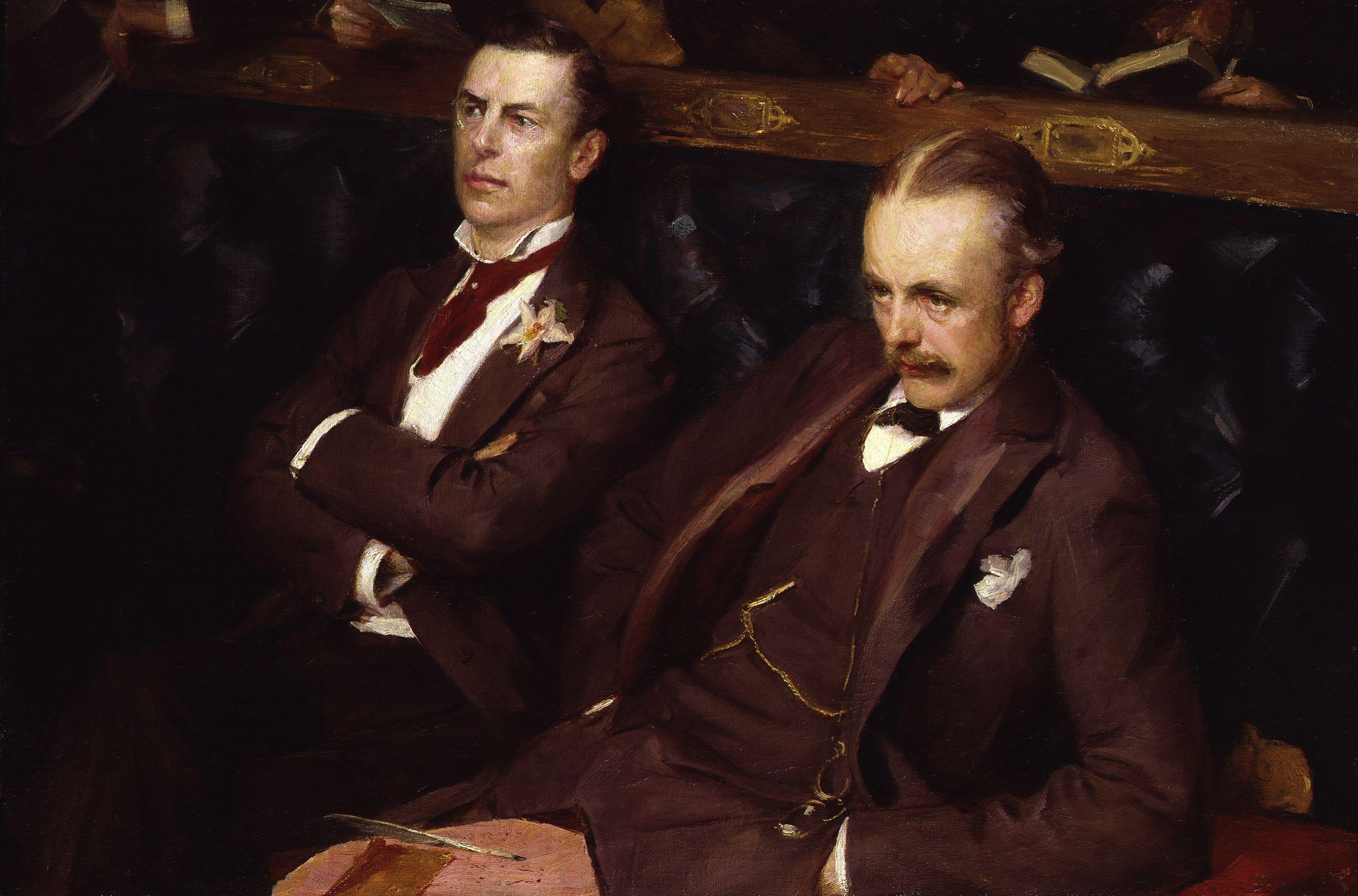
Joseph Chamberlain and Arthur Balfour by Sydney Prior Hall. In 1892, Chamberlain became leader of the Liberal Unionists in the House of Commons, beginning a fruitful relationship with Conservative leader and future Prime Minister Arthur Balfour (right).

Chamberlain became concerned about the threat of socialism during this period, although the Independent Labour Party had only one MP, Keir Hardie. He sought to divert collectivist energy toward Unionism and continued to propose radical reforms to the Conservatives. In his 1893 "Memorandum of a Programme for Social Reform", Chamberlain made a number of suggestions to Salisbury, including old age pensions, the provision of home loans to the working class, an amendment to the Artisans' and Labourers' Dwellings Improvement Act 1875 to encourage street improvements, compensation for industrial accidents, reduced train fares for workers, tighter border controls, and shorter working hours. Salisbury was guardedly sympathetic. Chamberlain also wrote an unpublished 1895 play, The Game of Politics, characterising socialists as the instigators of class conflict.

On 21 June 1895, the Liberal government was defeated on a motion that criticised the Henry Campbell-Bannerman, Secretary of State for War, for shortages of cordite, and Salisbury was invited to form a government.

== Statesman: 1895–1903 ==
=== Colonial Secretary ===
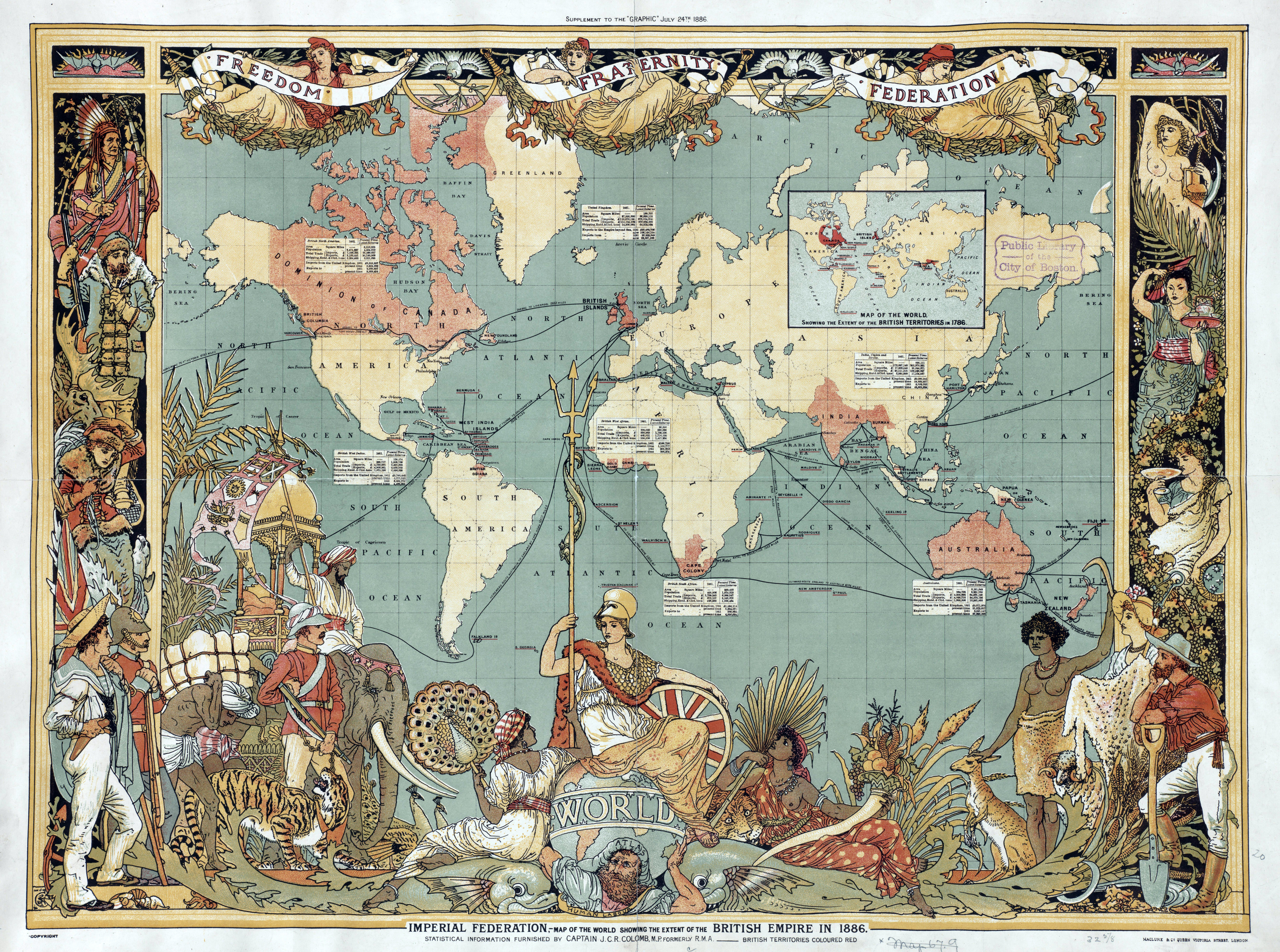
As Colonial Secretary, Chamberlain was guided by a policy of Imperial Federation, especially as to the settler colonies of Australia, Canada, New Zealand, Newfoundland, and South Africa.

Having agreed to a set of policies, the Conservatives and Liberal Unionists formed a government on 24 June 1895, with Liberal Unionists granted four Cabinet positions. Salisbury and Balfour offered Chamberlain any Cabinet position except Foreign Secretary or Leader of the House of Commons which they reserved for themselves respectively. To their surprise, Chamberlain asked for the Colonial Office, declining the Exchequer, for unwillingness to be constrained by Conservative spending plans, and Home Secretary. Chamberlain's choice to enter the cabinet in a subordinate role was the result of an adjustment in his political strategy following a lost dispute over a seat at Leamington Spa putting his program of social reform on the back burner. Chamberlain took formal charge of the Colonial Office on 1 July 1895, with a Unionist victory assured in the upcoming general election. He would remain in the position for eight years.

To further surprise, Chamberlain used the Colonial Office to become one of the dominant figures in British politics and a statesman of global consequence. His ministerial portfolio included control of numerous colonies, notably excluding India and Canada. Once an outspoken anti-imperialist, Chamberlain's unionism had by 1895 led him to fully embrace Imperial Federation as an alternative, with support from Conservative backbenchers. He sought to foster closer relations between Great Britain and the settler colonies, expand the Empire in Africa, the Americas, and Asia, and reorder imperial trade through preferential tariffs. His proposals faced opposition from the settler colonies themselves, which sought greater autonomy under the Crown.

In addition to a policy of imperial unity, Chamberlain aggressively pursued development projects in each colony. Chamberlain stated confidently, "I believe that the British race is the greatest of the governing races that the world has ever seen... It is not enough to occupy great spaces of the world's surface unless you can make the best of them. It is the duty of a landlord to develop his estate." Accordingly, he advocated investment in underdeveloped possessions, especially Africa and the West Indies, which earned him the nickname "Joseph Africanus" among the press. He also recognised the need to handle the unfamiliar tropical diseases that ravaged Britain's subject peoples. With Chamberlain's support, Patrick Manson founded the London School of Tropical Medicine, the world's second medical facility dedicated to tropical medicine, in 1899.

==== West Africa ====
Some of Chamberlain's development and colonial expansion efforts were centered on West Africa, in light of the region's economic potential and ongoing colonial gamesmanship with the French which centered there. Though Salisbury was willing to sacrifice West African claims in favour of a Cape-to-Cairo strategy, Chamberlain sought expansion on both fronts.

In 1895, Chamberlain sanctioned the conquest of the Ashanti Confederacy and its annexation to the Gold Coast. Using the emergency funds of the colonies of Lagos, Sierra Leone and the Gold Coast, he ordered the construction of a railway for the newly conquered area. The Colonial Office's aggressive strategy brought it into conflict with the Royal Niger Company. The Company, chaired by Sir George Goldie, possessed title rights to large stretches of the Niger River but had yet to assume governing responsibilities. With the area open to incursion, the French sent small garrisons to the region. In 1897, Chamberlain was dismayed to learn that the French had expanded from Dahomey to Bussa, a town claimed by Goldie. Further French expansion threatened to isolate Lagos; Chamberlain therefore argued that "even at the cost of war" Britain should "keep an adequate Hinterland for the Gold Coast, Lagos & the Niger Territories."

Influenced by Chamberlain, Salisbury sanctioned British Ambassador in Paris Sir Edmund Monson to take an assertive diplomatic stance. Subsequent concessions by the French encouraged Chamberlain, who arranged for a military force commanded by Frederick Lugard to occupy the region. In a risky 'chequerboard' strategy, Lugard's forces occupied French claims to counterbalance the French garrisons in British territory. At times, French and British troops were stationed merely a few yards from each other, threatening war. Nevertheless, Chamberlain correctly assumed French officers were ordered to avoid conflict. In March 1898, the French proposed a settlement: Bussa was returned to Britain in exchange for the town of Bona, imposing British control over the Niger and the inland territories of Sokoto; the region was later consolidated as Nigeria.

In 1898, the Mende and Temne tribes of Sierra Leone launched the Hut Tax War against inland colonial expansion. Chamberlain appointed Sir David Patrick Chalmers as a special commissioner to investigate the violence. Chalmers blamed the tax, but Chamberlain disagreed and blamed African slave traders. Chamberlain used the revolt to promote his aggressive "constructive imperialism" in West Africa.

==== Involvement in Jameson Raid: 1895–96 ====
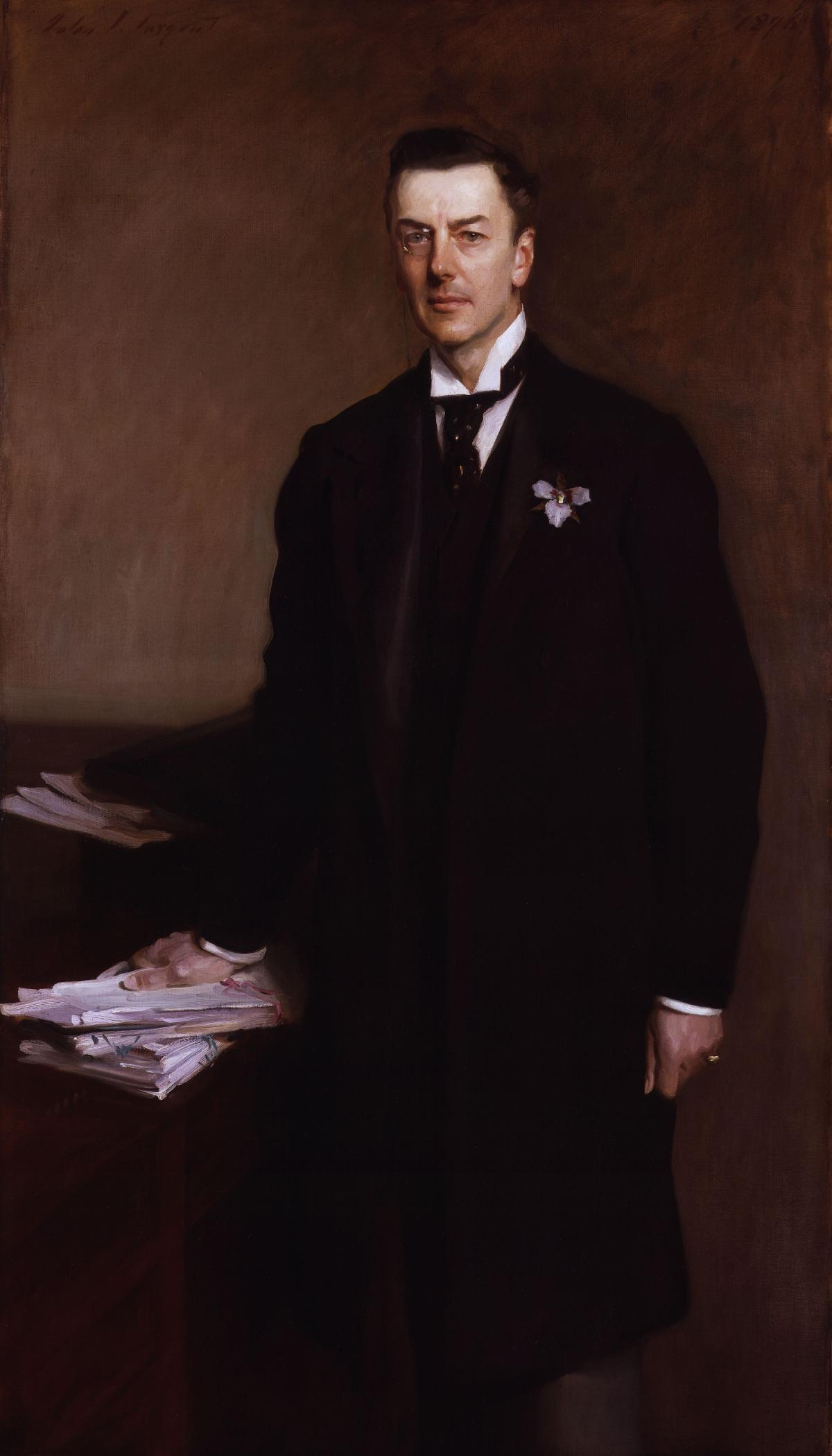
The Right Honourable Joseph Chamberlain, oil on canvas, 1896, John Singer Sargent. National Portrait Gallery, London

In November 1895, Prime Minister of the Cape Colony Cecil Rhodes assembled the private army of the British South Africa Company (of which he was also managing director) on land along the border with the South African Republic. Rhodes, who shared Chamberlain's desire to extend British dominion to all of South Africa, hoped to encourage the primarily British Uitlanders to revolt against the Afrikaner republic and overthrow its government. He placed the army under the command of Leander Starr Jameson.

On Boxing Day, Chamberlain informed Salisbury that a rebellion was expected, though he said he remained uncertain of its date. In fact, Chamberlain had requested his Assistant Under-Secretary to encourage Rhodes to "hurry up" (given the deteriorating Venezuelan situation). Upon learning of the Jameson Raid's initiation on 31 December (two days after it began), Chamberlain remarked, "If this succeeds, it will ruin me. I'm going up to London to crush it". He ordered Governor Hercules Robinson to repudiate the raid and warned Rhodes that his implication in the raid would endanger the Company's charter. The raid ultimately failed, and the raiders, including Jameson, were arrested and tried in London.

During the trial, Rhodes' solicitor claimed that cablegrams between Rhodes and his agents in London, including Chamberlain's urge to "hurry up," demonstrated that the Colonial Office "influenced the actions of those in South Africa" who had participated in the raid. The solicitor further alleged that Chamberlain had transferred the land to the Company to facilitate the raid. In June 1896, Chamberlain showed Salisbury one or more of the cablegrams and offered his resignation. Salisbury refused, possibly reluctant to lose the government's most popular figure, and aggressively supported Chamberlain by endorsing his threat to withdraw the Company's charter if the cablegrams were revealed. Accordingly, Rhodes withheld them. As no evidence was produced, a select committee absolved Chamberlain of responsibility.

Chamberlain's involvement in the planning and ultimate failure of the raid remain controversial, as do his and Salisbury's subsequent efforts to obscure the extent of that involvement. In 2002, The Van Riebeeck Society published Secret History of the Jameson Raid and the South African Crisis, 1895–1902, a contemporary insider account by Robinson's secretary, Sir Graham Bower. Bower suggests that the Colonial Office covered up Chamberlain's own involvement and knowledge of the raid. In a 2004 review for The Historian, Alan Cousins commented, "A number of major themes and concerns emerge, perhaps the most poignant being Bower's accounts of his being made a scapegoat in the aftermath of the raid: 'since a scapegoat was wanted, I was willing to serve my country in that capacity.'"

Cousins further writes:

[Bower] believed that, as he had given Rhodes his word not to divulge certain private conversations, he had to abide by that, while at the same time he was convinced that it would be very damaging to Britain if he said anything to the parliamentary committee to show the close involvement of Sir Hercules Robinson and Joseph Chamberlain in their disreputable encouragement of those plotting an uprising in Johannesburg. ... In his reflections, Bower has a particularly damning judgement on Chamberlain, whom he accuses of 'brazen lying' to Parliament, and of what amounted to forgery in the documents made public for the inquiry. In the report of the committee, Bower was found culpable of complicity, while no blame was attached to Joseph Chamberlain or Robinson. His name was never cleared during his lifetime, and Bower was never reinstated to what he believed should be his proper position in the colonial service: he was, in effect, demoted to the post of Colonial Secretary in Mauritius.

==== Attempts at Anglo-German alliance: 1898–99 ====
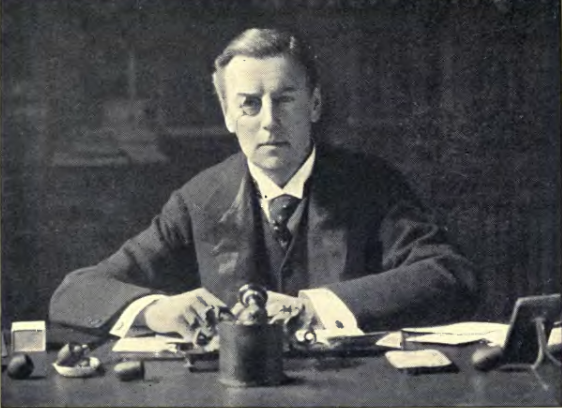
Joseph Chamberlain at his desk at the Colonial Office

On 29 March 1898, at a period of Anglo-German tensions following the Jameson Raid and Kruger Telegram, Chamberlain met the German Ambassador, Paul von Hatzfeldt, in London. The conversation was strictly unofficial, ostensibly to discuss colonial matters and China. Chamberlain surprised Hatzfeldt by assuring him that Britain and Germany had common interests and that a defensive alliance should be formed with regards to China. From the German perspective, prospects for even a limited alliance were dim. The Reichstag was debating Admiral Alfred von Tirpitz's First Navy Bill, which characterised Britain as a threat to Germany. Foreign Minister Bernhard von Bülow preferred an alliance with Russia, reasoning that democracy in Britain rendered any alliance unstable, given that a new Parliament and new Cabinet could quickly reverse the diplomatic commitments of its predecessors. Hatzfeldt was therefore instructed to make an agreement appear likely without ever conceding to Chamberlain. On 25 April, Hatzfeldt asked for colonial concessions as a precursor to a better relationship. Chamberlain rejected the proposal, thereby terminating the talks. Though Salisbury was unsurprised, Chamberlain was disappointed and spoke publicly of Britain's diplomatic predicament at Birmingham on 13 May, saying that "We have had no allies. I am afraid we have had no friends... We stand alone."

A second round of talks opened with Chamberlain in complete control, Salisbury having taken leave in July 1899 to attend to his dying wife. The predicate for negotiations was the death of King Malietoa Laupepa of Samoa, a tripartite protectorate of Britain, Germany, and the United States. The ensuing succession was contested by a German proxy, Mata'afa Iosefo, leading to civil war; the three powers thus attempted to negotiate a truce. Chamberlain, smarting from his talks with Hatzfeldt, refused an offer which would result in British withdrawal from Samoa for concessions elsewhere, remarking dismissively, "Last year we offered you everything. Now it is too late." (Note: Ultimately, Britain did surrender all rights to Samoa. On 2 December, the Tripartite Convention was signed, whereby Britain withdrew from Samoa in exchange for Tonga and the Solomon Islands and an end to German claims in West Africa.)

When British forcefulness incensed German official and public opinion, Chamberlain made efforts to improve relations by facilitating a visit by Kaiser Wilhelm II and von Bülow. During the visit, Chamberlain reiterated his desire for an agreement to both men. The Kaiser spoke optimistically but feared tensions with Russia and indicated that Salisbury's strategy of "splendid isolation" rendered any alliance unreliable. At a subsequent meeting with von Bülow, Chamberlain argued that Britain, Germany, and the United States should combine to check France and Russia. Von Bülow thought British assistance would be of little use and suggested that Chamberlain should speak positively of Germany in public. Chamberlain inferred from von Bülow's statement that he would reciprocate in the Reichstag.

On 30 November, the day after the Kaiser and von Bülow departed, Chamberlain spoke at Leicester of "a new Triple Alliance between the Teutonic race and the two great trans-Atlantic branches of the Anglo-Saxon race which would become a potent influence on the future of the world." Though the Kaiser was complimentary, Friedrich von Holstein described Chamberlain's speech as a "blunder," and The Times attacked Chamberlain for using the term "alliance" without inhibition. On 11 December, von Bülow spoke in support of von Tirpitz's Second Navy Bill, and made no reference to an agreement with Britain, which he described as a declining nation jealous of Germany. Chamberlain was startled and irritated, but von Hatzfeldt assured him that von Bülow's motivation was to fend off opponents in the Reichstag, and Chamberlain's hopes for an alliance remained alive.

==== Boer War: 1899–1902 ====
After the failed Jameson Raid and the growing wealth of the Transvaal following the discovery of gold, British hopes for the federation of South Africa under the Crown waned. By 1897, it appeared certain that any future union of the Southern African states would be as a Boer-dominated republic outside the British Empire. Nevertheless, Chamberlain directed a steady upkeep of military pressure on the Transvaal and Orange Free State, ostensibly to protect the civil rights of the Uitlanders. In April 1897, Chamberlain asked the Cabinet to increase the British garrison in South Africa by three to four thousand men; forces grew over the next two years. In August 1897, the government appointed Sir Alfred Milner, the High Commissioner for Southern Africa and Governor of the Cape Colony, to pursue the issue more directly. Within a year, Milner concluded that war was inevitable and worked with Chamberlain to publicise the cause of the Uitlanders to the British people.

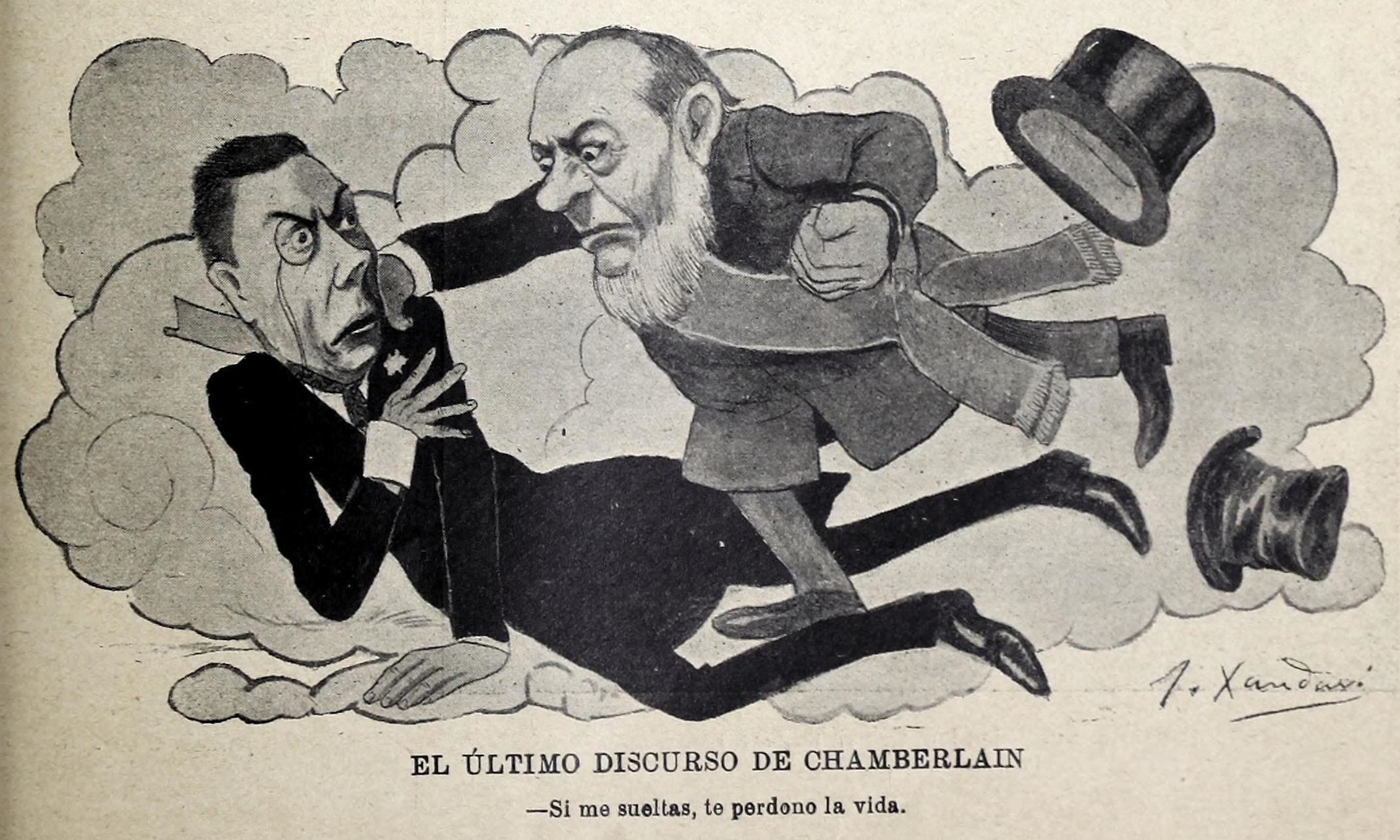
Political cartoon by Joaquín Xaudaró featuring Kruger and Chamberlain (Blanco y Negro, 9 December 1899).

In May 1899, Milner met with State President of the South African Republic Paul Kruger but failed to resolve tensions; the Boers left the conference convinced that the British were determined to use force. By now, British public opinion supported war in support of the Uitlanders, allowing Chamberlain to successfully request further reinforcements. By October 1899, nearly 20,000 British troops were based in the South African colonies with thousands more en route. On 9 October, Kruger issued an ultimatum for the withdrawal of British troops from the borders and the return of any troops destined for South Africa. On 12 October, the South African Republic and Orange Free State declared war.

Chamberlain directed the war from the Colonial Office; Salisbury rubber-stamped his decisions. Early fighting favored the Boers. Boer regular army units outnumbered the British 3:1 on the front lines and quickly besieged the towns of Ladysmith, Mafeking and Kimberley. Some ten thousand Cape Afrikaners joined the Boers. In mid-December 1899, the British Army suffered reverses at the battles of Stormberg, Magersfontein and Colenso in what came to be known as "Black Week."

Chamberlain privately criticized the Army's performance and was exasperated by Lord Lansdowne, Secretary of State for War. When the Boers bombarded Ladysmith with Creusot ninety-four pounder siege guns, Chamberlain asked for the dispatch of comparable artillery to the war. Landsdowne argued that such weapons required platforms that needed a year of preparation, even though the Boers operated theirs without elaborate mountings. Chamberlain was also resistant to Milner's desire to suspend the constitution of the Cape Colony, an act that would have given Milner autocratic powers and threatened to deepen internal divisions between British and Afrikaner subjects.

Throughout the war, Chamberlain worked to strengthen bonds between Britain and her self-governing colonies under the slogan "One Flag, One Queen, One Tongue." Over 30,000 troops from Canada, Australia and New Zealand served in the war. In particular, the contributions of mounted men from the settler colonies helped fill the Army's mounted infantry shortfall. Chamberlain also managed the Commonwealth of Australia Constitution Act through the Commons, hoping that the newly established federation would adopt a positive wartime attitude towards imperial trade.

As the government's foremost defender of the war, Chamberlain was denounced by many prominent anti-war personalities, including his former admirer, David Lloyd George. When the government faced a vote of censure in the House of Commons concerning the management of the war, Chamberlain conducted the defence. On 5 February, Chamberlain spoke effectively in the Commons for over an hour. He defended the war, espoused the virtues of a South African federation and promoted the Empire. The censure was subsequently defeated by 213 votes. British fortunes changed after January 1900 with the appointment of Lord Roberts to command British forces in South Africa. Bloemfontein was occupied on 13 March, Johannesburg on 31 May and Pretoria on 5 June.

When Roberts formally annexed the Transvaal on 3 September, the Salisbury ministry, emboldened by an apparent victory, asked for the dissolution of Parliament, with an election set for October.

=== Workmen's Compensation Act and pension proposal ===
Despite his focus on foreign policy as Colonial Secretary, Chamberlain had not abandoned his long dedication to social reform. His Workmen's Compensation Act 1897, which adapted the German model, was a key domestic achievement of the Unionist government. It cost the Treasury nothing since compensation was paid for by insurance that employers were required to take out. The system operated from 1897 to 1946.

Chamberlain also attempted to design an old age pension programme but failed to gain Conservative approval. Further opposition came from friendly societies, which were funded by their own private members' pension program.

== Zenith of power: 1900–03 ==
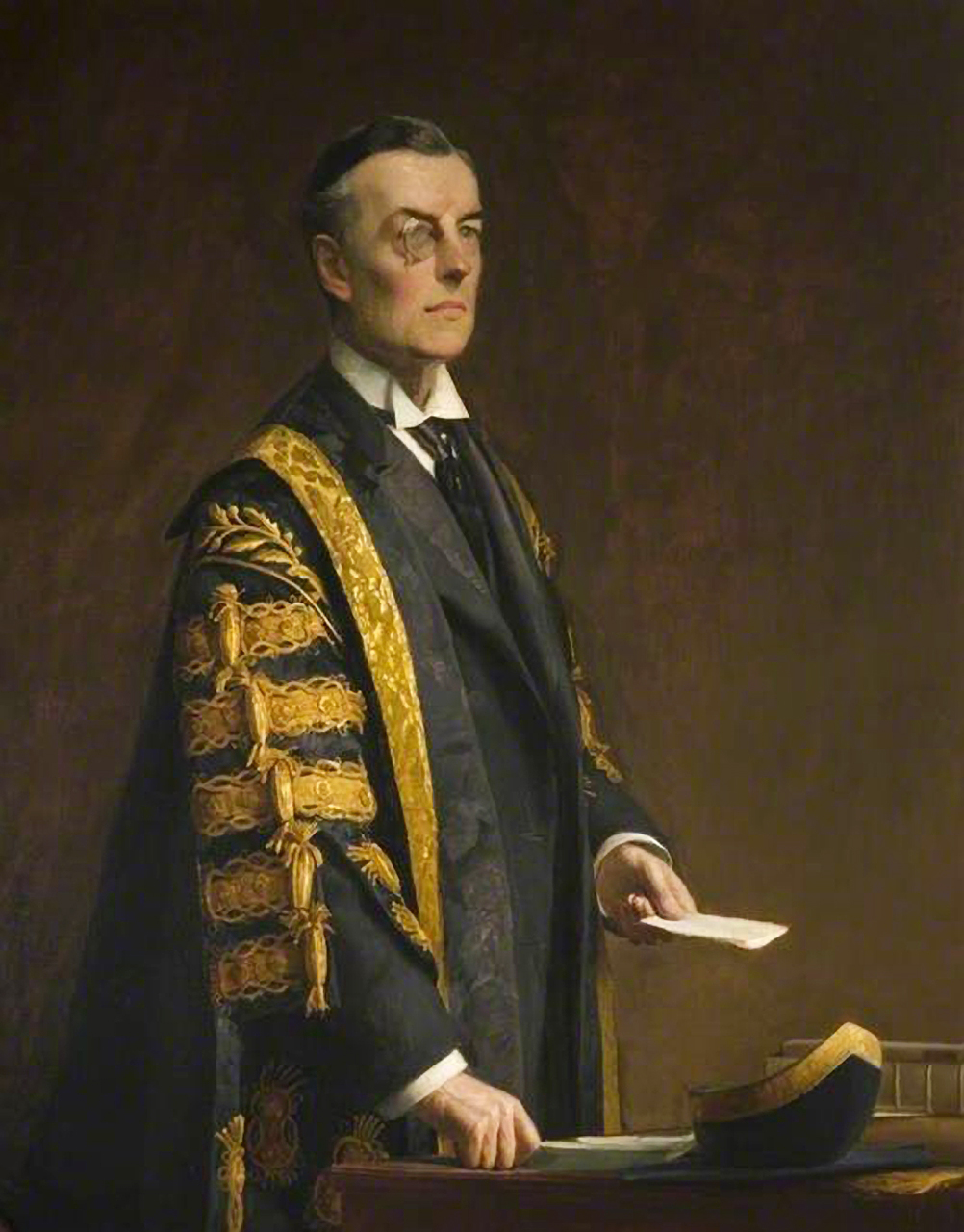
Portrait by Harrington Mann, c.1900

=== Khaki Election of 1900 ===
In the 1900 election Salisbury, in mourning for his wife and ill himself, made no speeches and Balfour made few public appearances. In their stead Chamberlain dominated the Unionist campaign to the point that some referred to it as "Joe's election”. He ensured that the Boer War featured as the campaign's single issue, arguing that a Liberal victory would result in defeat in South Africa and lending the election its ‘khaki election’ sobriquet, after the colour of the new uniforms worn by British troops.

The Unionists controversially tied their Liberal opponents direct to the enemy using the phrase "Every seat lost to the government is a seat sold to the Boers"; some posters portrayed Liberal MPs praising Kruger and helping him to haul down the Union Jack. Chamberlain himself made personal use of such tactics, declaring in a speech, "We have come practically to the end of the war... There is nothing going on now but a guerrilla business, which is encouraged by these men—I was going to say those traitors, but I will say instead these misguided individuals." Some Liberals resorted to retaliatory tactics, with Lloyd George in particular accusing Chamberlain's son and brother of war profiteering. Though many Liberals rejected Lloyd George's claims and Chamberlain dismissed them as unworthy of reply, the charges troubled him more than he was prepared to make evident in public.

Leveraging the cause of imperialism to devastating effect and splitting the Liberals over the war, the Unionists won a huge 219-seat majority in the House of Commons. Though the mandate was not as comprehensive as Chamberlain had hoped, it strengthened the government and his own standing within it, allowing him to pursue his vision for the Empire.

A twenty-six-year-old Winston Churchill, already famous for his wartime correspondence for The Morning Post and escape from a prisoner-of-war camp, successfully stood as a Conservative candidate in Oldham. Chamberlain spoke on his behalf, and Churchill later recalled the experience:

I watched my honoured guest with close attention. He loved the roar of the multitude, and with my father could always say 'I have never feared the English democracy.' The blood mantled in his cheek, and his eye as it caught mine twinkled with pure enjoyment.

Churchill later wrote of the period, "Mr. Chamberlain was incomparably the most live, sparkling, insurgent, compulsive figure in British affairs ... 'Joe' was the one who made the weather. He was the man the masses knew."

=== Third failed attempt at Anglo-German alliance: 1900–02 ===
The ailing Salisbury resigned as Foreign Secretary at the conclusion of the 1900 election, under pressure from Balfour and Queen Victoria. (Note: The Queen was dying herself. Chamberlain was the last minister to see her alive, just days before her death on 22 January 1901.) He was succeeded in that role by the relatively inexperienced Lord Lansdowne, but Chamberlain seized the initiative in British foreign affairs. His first goal was, yet again, to formulate an agreement with Germany.

On 16 January 1901, Chamberlain and Spencer Cavendish, 8th Duke of Devonshire made it known to Baron Hermann von Eckardstein that Britain still planned to join the Triple Alliance. The news was received with some satisfaction in Berlin, although von Bülow continued to exercise caution. The Kaiser urged a positive response, but von Bülow wished to delay negotiations until Britain was made vulnerable by the ongoing war in South Africa. On 18 March, Eckardstein asked Chamberlain to resume negotiations, but he was unwilling to commit himself following von Bülow's 1899 rebuke. Instead, Eckardstein negotiated directly with the Foreign Secretary, Landsdowne, and Chamberlain was sidelined. A five-year Anglo-German defensive alliance was presented, to be ratified by Parliament and the Reichstag. When Lansdowne prevaricated, von Hatzfeldt presented a demanding invitation for Britain to join the Triple Alliance, committed to the defence of Austria-Hungary. Salisbury decided decisively against entering as a junior partner.

On 25 October 1901, as part of a defense of British Army tactics in South Africa, Chamberlain made a favorable comparison to the conduct of troops in the Franco-Prussian War, a statement directed at Germany. Despite outrage in the German press and von Bülow's demand for an apology, Chamberlain was unrepentant. This public dispute finally ended Chamberlain's hopes of an Anglo-German alliance, but Chamberlain's popularity in Britain soared, with The Times commenting, "Mr. Chamberlain... is at this moment the most popular and trusted man in England." Still seeking an end to "splendid isolation," Chamberlain sought to escalate negotiations with French Ambassador Paul Cambon (begun in March 1901 to settle colonial differences), though neither Lansdowne nor Cambon moved as quickly as Chamberlain would have liked. In February 1902, at a banquet at Marlborough House held by King Edward VII, Chamberlain and Cambon resumed their negotiations, with Eckardstein reputedly listening to their conversation and only successfully managing to comprehend the words "Morocco" and "Egypt". Chamberlain had contributed to making possible the Anglo-French Entente Cordiale that would occur in 1904.

=== Conclusion of the Boer War: 1900–02 ===
Despite Chamberlain's and popular belief throughout the general election campaign, the Boers had not been subdued, and the "guerrilla business" to which Chamberlain referred persisted through May 1902. As the war dragged on Chamberlain was caught between Unionists demanding a more effective military policy and many Liberals denouncing the conduct of the war.

==== Concentration camps scandal ====
Publicly, Chamberlain called for greater deference to Roberts's military judgment and administration, insisting upon the separation of civil and military authority. However public pressure on Chamberlain and the civilian government to intervene intensified following the exposition of concentration camps and the poor conditions therein. Chamberlain had originally questioned the wisdom of establishing the camps, intended to house refugee families, but tolerated them out of deference to the military.

As the scandal intensified in the autumn of 1901 Chamberlain strengthened civilian administration, though he refused to criticise the military publicly. He outlined to Milner the importance of making the camps as habitable as possible, asking whether the governor-general considered medical provisions adequate. Chamberlain also stipulated that unhealthy camps should be evacuated, overruling the Army where necessary. By 1902 the death rate in the camps had halved, ultimately falling below the usual mortality rate in rural South Africa.

==== Peace ====
Despite the concerns of Chancellor of the Exchequer Michael Hicks Beach over the increasing cost of the war, Chamberlain maintained insistence on unconditional surrender with the support of Salisbury. Though Lord Kitchener, commanding British forces in South Africa, was eager to make peace, Milner was content to wait until the Boers sought terms. In April 1902, Boer negotiators accepted Chamberlain's conditions, dissolution of the South African Republic and Orange Free State, in exchange for amnesty for Cape Afrikaner rebels and a payment of the republics' war debts. Chamberlain accepted over Milner's objection, arguing that the cost of continuing the war justified the expenditure. The Treaty of Vereeniging ended the Boer War on 31 May 1902. The end of war and the annexation of Boer territory presented Chamberlain an opportunity to remodel Britain's imperial system, though at a high cost: the British had put nearly 450,000 troops into the field and had spent nearly £200 million.

=== Salisbury resignation and Balfour government: 1902 ===
The end of the war allowed Salisbury to finally retire. Though the Prime Minister was keen to be succeeded by his nephew Balfour, Chamberlain's supporters felt the Colonial Secretary, as the most popular figure in the government, had a legitimate claim to the premiership. Leo Maxse argued forcefully in the National Review for Chamberlain as prime minister; Chamberlain himself was less concerned, assuring Balfour's private secretary, "I have my own work to do and... I shall be quite willing to serve under Balfour."

On 7 July 1902, Chamberlain suffered a head injury in a traffic accident. Chamberlain had three stitches and was told by doctors to cease work immediately and remain in bed for two weeks.

On 11 July, Salisbury went to Buckingham Palace without notifying his Cabinet colleagues and resigned. The King invited Balfour to form a new government later that day. Before accepting, Balfour met Chamberlain, who said he was content to remain Colonial Secretary. Despite Chamberlain's organisational skills and immense popularity, many Conservatives still mistrusted his Radicalism, and Chamberlain was aware of the difficulties that would be presented by being part of a Liberal Unionist minority leading a Conservative majority. Balfour and Chamberlain were both aware that the Unionist government's survival depended on their co-operation.

==== Education Act 1902 ====
One of Balfour's first acts as prime minister was the introduction of an Education Act, intended to promote National Efficiency. Though Chamberlain supported the cause, the Balfour Act abolished the 2,568 school boards established under the Elementary Education Act 1870 (33 & 34 Vict. c. 75) which remained popular with Nonconformists and Radicals and replaced them with local education authorities to administer a state centred system of primary, secondary and technical schools. The Bill would also give ratepayers' money to voluntary Church of England schools; opposition to that provision in the 1870 Act had spurred on Chamberlain's first involvement in politics.

Chamberlain was aware that the Bill would estrange Nonconformists, Radicals and many Liberal Unionists from the government, but could not oppose it without risking his cabinet post. In response to Chamberlain's warning and suggestion that voluntary Church schools receive funds from central rather than local government, Robert Laurie Morant replied that the Boer War had drained the Exchequer. Chamberlain did temporarily secure a major concession: local authorities would be given the discretion over the issue of rate aid to voluntary schools. Yet even this was renounced before the Act's passage in December 1902. Chamberlain wrote fatalistically, "I consider the Unionist cause is hopeless at the next election, and we shall certainly lose the majority of the Liberal Unionists once and for all."

==== Zionism and "Uganda Proposal": 1902–03 ====
On 23 October 1902, Chamberlain met with Theodor Herzl and expressed his sympathy to the Zionist cause. He was open to Herzl's plan for settlement on the Sinai Peninsula near Arish, but his support was conditional on approval from the Cairo authorities. On 24 April 1903, convinced that such approval would not come, Chamberlain offered Herzl a territory in British East Africa. The proposal came to be known as the Uganda Scheme, as Chamberlain saw the land as he was passing by on the Uganda Railway, though the territory in question was in Kenya. The proposal was rejected by both the Zionist Organization and British settlers in East Africa but was a major break-through for the Zionists, as Great Britain had engaged them diplomatically and recognised a need to find a territory appropriate for Jewish autonomy under British suzerainty.

==== South African tour: 1902–03 ====
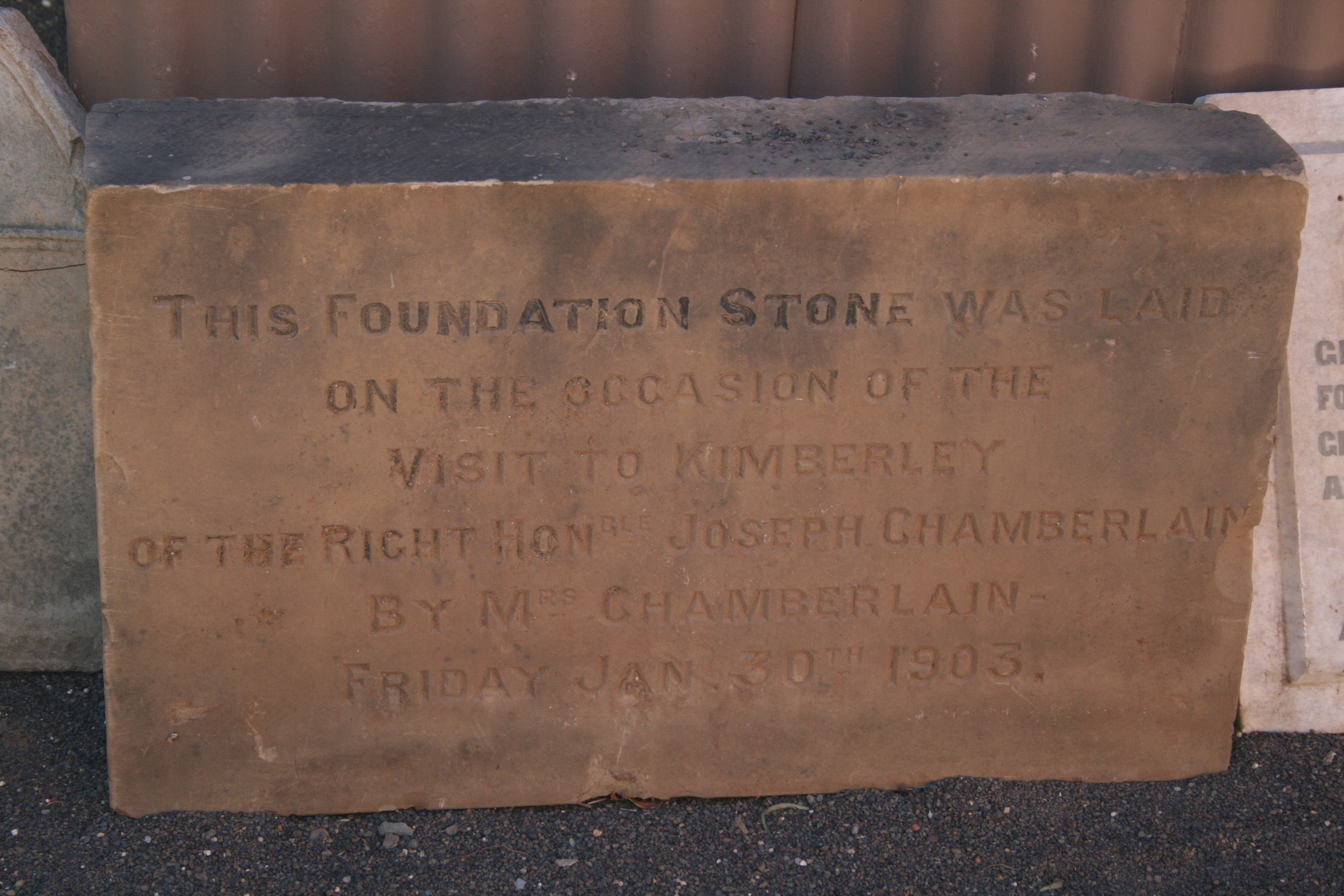
A cornerstone laid by Mrs Chamberlain during her husband's South African tour

From 26 December 1902 to 25 February 1903, Chamberlain left Britain for a South African tour, seeking to promote Anglo-Afrikaner conciliation and integration into the British Empire. In Natal, Chamberlain was given a rapturous welcome. In the former Transvaal, he met Boer leaders who were attempting unsuccessfully to alter the peace terms. The reception given to Chamberlain in the former Orange Free State, (at the time renamed the Orange River Colony) was surprisingly friendly, although he engaged in a two-hour argument with General James Barry Munnik Hertzog, who accused the British government of violating three terms of the treaty.

During his visit, Chamberlain became convinced that the Boer territories required a period of government by the British crown before being granted self-governance within the empire. In the Cape, Chamberlain found that the Afrikaner Bond was more affable regarding his visit than many members of the English speaking Progressive Party, now under the leadership of Jameson, who called Chamberlain "the callous devil from Birmingham". Chamberlain successfully persuaded the prime minister, John Gordon Sprigg, to hold elections as soon as possible, a positive act considering the hostile nature of the Cape Parliament since 1899. During the tour, Chamberlain and his wife visited 29 towns, and he delivered 64 speeches and received 84 deputations.

== Tariff reform, Unionist split, and countrywide crusade: 1902–06 ==
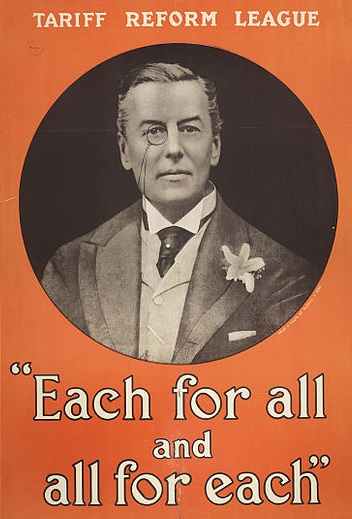
A Tariff Reform League poster features Chamberlain's image.

As an extension of Chamberlain's desire for Imperial Federation against a growing global shift towards the German Empire and the United States of America, he sought to unify and strengthen the imperial economy on the model of Otto von Bismarck's Zollverein and the American protective system. This desire was manifested in the policy of imperial preference, which imposed tariffs on foreign imports to favour imperial trade and generate revenue to finance social improvements. To do so, Chamberlain prepared to end the free trade consensus that had dominated British economics since the repeal of the Corn Laws in 1846.

=== Corn tax and 1903 budget contest ===
In April 1902, Chamberlain dined with the Hughligans, a small parliamentary clique led by Lord Hugh Cecil. Winston Churchill, among its members in attendance, later recalled:

As [Chamberlain] rose to leave he paused at the door, and turning said with much deliberation, "You young gentlemen have entertained me royally, and in return I will give you a priceless secret. Tariffs! They are the politics of the future, and of the near future. Study them closely and make yourself masters of them, and you will not regret your hospitality to me."

In the same month, Chancellor Michael Hicks Beach levied a small duty on corn imports to raise revenue for the War. Chamberlain was further encouraged in June by a report from Gerald Balfour, the president of the Board of Trade and the Prime Minister's younger brother, recommending reciprocal trade agreements with the colonies. In July, the Colonial Conference convened in London and passed a resolution endorsing Imperial Preference. Chamberlain was confident his proposals were gathering popularity, and he brought imperial preference before the Cabinet on 21 October before embarking on his South African tour. Despite vigorous opposition by the new chancellor, Charles Thomson Ritchie, the Cabinet was generally favourable towards the proposal. In November, the Cabinet agreed to remit the corn tax in favour of the self-governing colonies in the upcoming budget. Chamberlain thus departed for his tour thinking that he had gained the agreement of the Cabinet.

While Chamberlain spent the winter in South Africa, Ritchie worked to reverse the Cabinet's decision. In March 1903, Ritchie asked Balfour to schedule a meeting to propose the budget to the Cabinet. Balfour refused and warned Chamberlain of Ritchie's continued opposition. Chamberlain arrived in Southampton on 14 March prepared to struggle with Ritchie for the maintenance of the corn tax, but he was shocked to find the majority of the Cabinet in agreement with Ritchie. Balfour chose not to oppose Ritchie, for fear of losing his chancellor on the eve of the budget. Chamberlain accepted defeat.

On 23 April, the Chancellor presented his free trade budget without opposition. Chamberlain bided his time and retaliated in a speech on 15 May at Bingley Hall, before which he remarked to the event's organiser, "You can burn your leaflets. We are going to talk about something else." In his speech, he lamented the demise of the corn tax and insisted that imperial preference, which he hoped would dominate the next general election, was the only means to maintain the Empire. His impromptu speech stunned Balfour, who had just publicly insisted imperial preference could wait, and the Cabinet. On 28 May, Chamberlain reiterated his challenge in the House of Commons amidst cheers from many Unionists.

To defuse Chamberlain's rebellion, Balfour devoted the summer to the study of the question of imperial preference versus free trade. He publicly professed support for neither policy, earning him criticism from the Liberals. Serious debate was sidelined while the Board of Trade compiled statistics, but a Cabinet meeting on 13 August failed to agree, and a final decision was postponed until 14 September, which Balfour hoped would allow Chamberlain time to moderate his position. Content to lose die-hard free trade supporters, Balfour prepared a memorandum containing a number of radical economic reforms.

=== Resignation from cabinet and public campaign ===
Five days in advance of the scheduled meeting, Chamberlain dramatically sent a letter of resignation to Balfour on 9 September, explaining his wish to campaign publicly for imperial preference outside the Cabinet. An hour before the meeting, Chamberlain and Balfour agreed that Chamberlain would publicly resign if the Cabinet could not be persuaded to adopt the new policy, and Austen Chamberlain would be promoted to chancellor to speak for his father inside the Cabinet. If Chamberlain's public campaign was successful, Balfour could endorse imperial preference at the next general election.

When the Cabinet failed to endorse his proposals, Chamberlain resigned. Balfour did not tell the meeting about Chamberlain's letter, instead telling many members he believed that Chamberlain was not serious. He then forced the resignations of Ritchie and Lord Balfour of Burleigh. The next day, Lord George Hamilton resigned, as did Devonshire. (Note: Devonshire rescinded his resignation after learning of Chamberlain's letter, but re-submitted it after Balfour announced his fiscal policy on 1 October.) After Devonshire's resignation, Chamberlain asserted his authority over the Liberal Unionists, and the National Union of Conservative and Unionist Associations declared majority support for tariff reform.

On 6 October 1903, Chamberlain began the campaign with a speech at Glasgow. With firm support from provincial Unionists and most of the press, Chamberlain extolled the virtues of imperialism and imperial preference to vast crowds. The newly formed Tariff Reform League received vast funding, allowing it to print and distribute large numbers of leaflets and even to play Chamberlain's recorded messages to public meetings by gramophone.

Chamberlain himself spoke at Greenock, Newcastle, Liverpool, and Leeds, within the first month. At Greenock, he argued free trade threatened British industry, declaring, "Sugar is gone. Silk has gone. Iron is threatened. Wool is threatened. Cotton will go! How long are you going to stand it? At the present moment these industries... are like sheep in a field." At Liverpool, Chamberlain was escorted by mounted police amidst wild cheering. Intending to enlist the working class, Chamberlain assured his audience that tariff reform ensured low unemployment, campaigning with the slogan, "Tariff Reform Means Work for All." When The Daily News countered that official import prices demonstrated a loaf of bread under tariff reform would be smaller than under free trade, Chamberlain arranged for two loaves to be baked based upon the respective prices. On 4 November 1903, Chamberlain put the loaves on display at Bingley Hall and, raising them aloft, asked the audience, "Is it not a sporting question... as to which is the larger?" While Chamberlain toured the country, Shadow Chancellor H. H. Asquith followed, preaching the virtues of free trade in the same venues only days later. Asquith's Liberals healed divisions to rally for free trade while Unionist divisions became more apparent.

The campaign had a brief intermission in February 1904, when Chamberlain, suffering from gout and neuralgia, took a two-month holiday. Around this time, he decided that the Unionists were likely to lose the next election and criticised Balfour, who had endorsed cautious protectionism but was unwilling to go further or announce an early general election, for delaying the inevitable. Chamberlain now hoped Balfour's guarded fiscal doctrine would fail, probably with a strategy of eventually leading the Unionists on a purely protectionist platform after their expected defeat in the general election. He wrote to his son Neville that "The Free Traders are common enemies. We must clear them out of the party & let them disappear."

By the end of 1904, the Tariff Reform League's numerous branches rivaled the Conservative National Union, and Chamberlain attempted to secure the League's representation inside Conservative Central Office. Balfour maintained his programme of retaliatory tariffs and attempted to minimise the apparent differences between Chamberlain and himself. Publicly, Chamberlain claimed that Balfour's stance was a precursor to full imperial preference. Approaching seventy years of age in 1905, Chamberlain continued to campaign for tariff reform with zeal and energy. Reconciliation appeared imminent when Balfour agreed to a general election after the 1906 Colonial Conference, but Balfour rescinded the agreement after backbench opposition and demanded party unity. Chamberlain ignored his demand and intensified the campaign in November 1905, resulting directly in Balfour's resignation on 4 December.

=== 1906 general election ===
The Liberal Party won the 1906 general election by a landslide. The Unionists, divided and out of favour with many former supporters, were reduced to just 157 seats in the House of Commons, though Chamberlain and his followers increased their majorities in the West Midlands.

Balfour lost his seat in Manchester East, and although the Unionists were now out of government for the first time in a decade, Chamberlain's position among them was at its apex. With the support of approximately 102 of the remaining 157 Unionists, Chamberlain became acting Leader of the Opposition after the election, and it appeared that he might become permanent leader or win a major concession in favour of tariff reform. Chamberlain asked for a party meeting, and Balfour (returned to the Commons) agreed on 14 February 1906 in the "Valentine letters" to concede that,

Fiscal Reform is, and must remain, the constructive work of the Unionist Party. That the objects of such reforms are to secure more equal terms of competition for British trade, and closer commercial union within the Colonies.

Although in opposition, it appeared that Chamberlain had successfully associated the Unionists with the cause of tariff reform, and Balfour would be compelled to accede to Chamberlain's future demands.

== Stroke, decline, and death ==
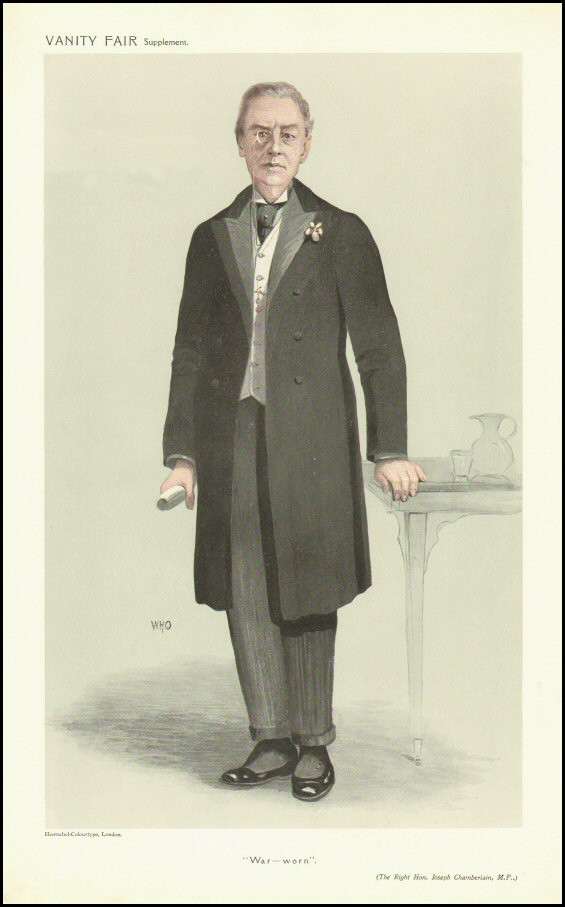
An ageing Chamberlain caricatured for Vanity Fair, 1908. Although his family attempted to conceal his disability, Chamberlain was barely capable of standing unaided by this time and was no longer an active member of the House of Commons.

On 8 July 1906 Chamberlain celebrated his seventieth birthday and Birmingham was enlivened for a number of days by official luncheons, public addresses, parades, bands and an influx of thousands of congratulatory telegrams. Tens of thousands of people crowded into the city for Chamberlain's passionate 10 July speech promoting the virtues of Radicalism and imperialism.

On 13 July Chamberlain collapsed while dressing for dinner in the bathroom of his house at Prince's Gardens. Mary found the door locked and called out, receiving the weakened reply, "I can't get out." Returning with help, she found him exhausted on the floor, having turned the handle from the inside. He had suffered a stroke that paralysed his right side. After a month Chamberlain was able to walk a small number of steps and resolved to overcome his disabilities. Although unaffected mentally, his sight had deteriorated, compelling him to wear spectacles instead of his monocle. His ability to read was diminished, forcing Mary to read him newspapers and letters. He lost the ability to write with his right hand and his speech altered noticeably. Chamberlain's colleague William Hewins noted, "His voice has lost all its old ring. ... He speaks very slowly and articulates with evident difficulty." Chamberlain barely regained his ability to walk.

Though he lost all hope of recovering his health and returning to active politics, Chamberlain continued to follow and support the tariff reform campaign and his son Austen's career. He opposed Liberal proposals to remove the House of Lords' veto and gave his blessing to Unionist opposition to Home Rule for Ireland. In the two general elections of 1910 he was returned unopposed in his Birmingham West constituency. In January 1914 Chamberlain decided not to seek re-election.

=== Death, memorials, and burial ===
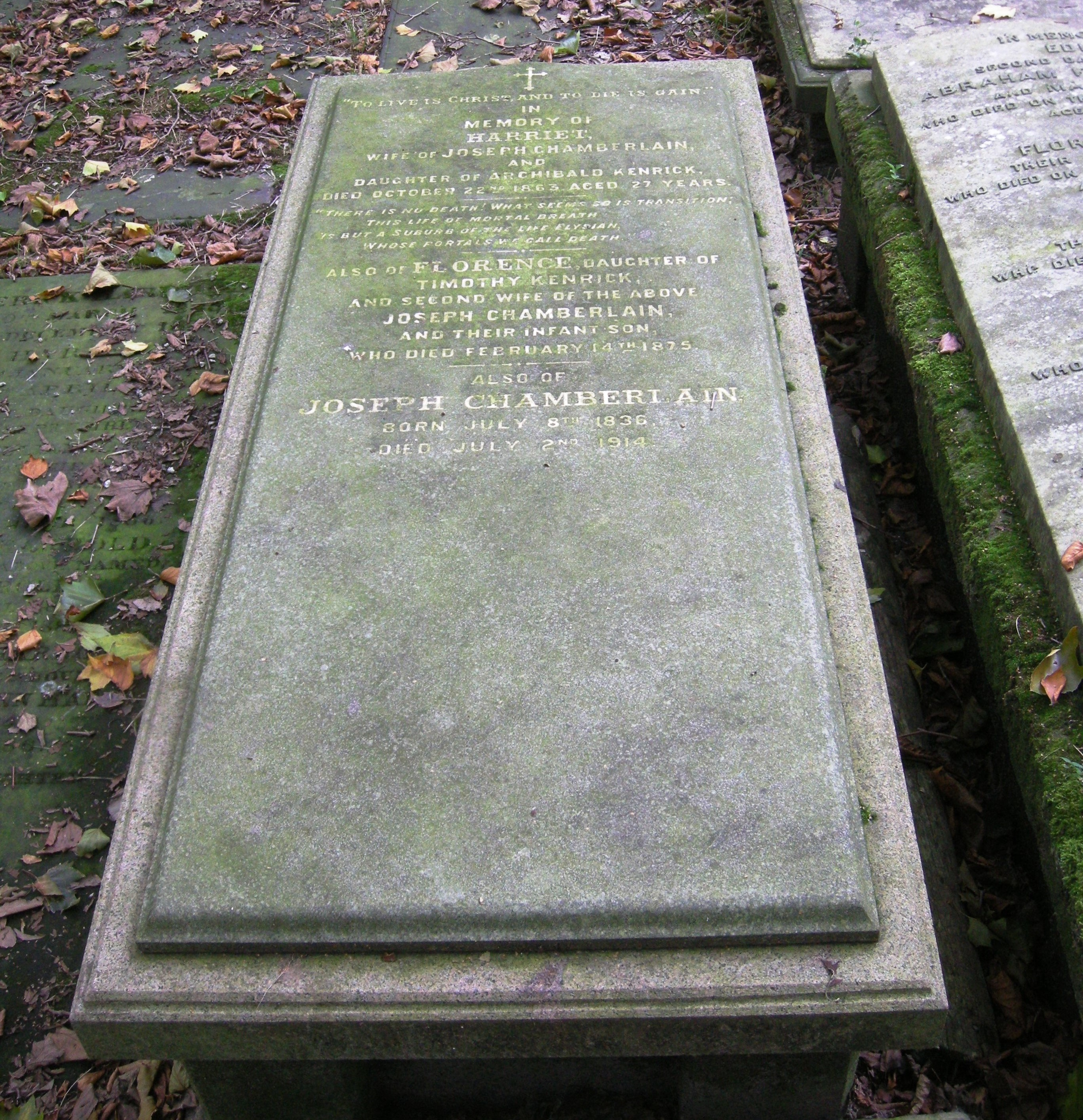
Grave of Joseph Chamberlain and his first two wives, Harriet (d. 1863) and Florence (d. 1875), in Key Hill Cemetery, Hockley, Birmingham

On 2 July 1914, six days before his 78th birthday, Chamberlain suffered a heart attack and died in his wife's arms, surrounded by his family.

Telegrams of condolence arrived from across the world. Prime Minister H. H. Asquith, Chamberlain's adversary a decade before, led the tributes in the House of Commons, declaring,

In [Chamberlain's] striking personality, vivid, masterful, resolute, tenacious, there were no blurred or nebulous outlines, there were no relaxed fibres, there were no moods of doubt and hesitation, there were no pauses of lethargy or fear.

His family refused an offer of an official burial at Westminster Abbey and a Unitarian ceremony was held in Birmingham. He was laid to rest at Key Hill Cemetery, Hockley, in the same grave as his first two wives, close to that of his parents. On 31 March 1916 the Chamberlain Memorial, a bust created by sculptor Mark Tweed, was unveiled at Westminster Abbey. Among those present were Arthur Balfour, Bonar Law, Chamberlain's sons Austen and Neville (then Lord Mayor of Birmingham) and other members of the Chamberlain, Hutton and Martineau families.

== Memory and historiography ==
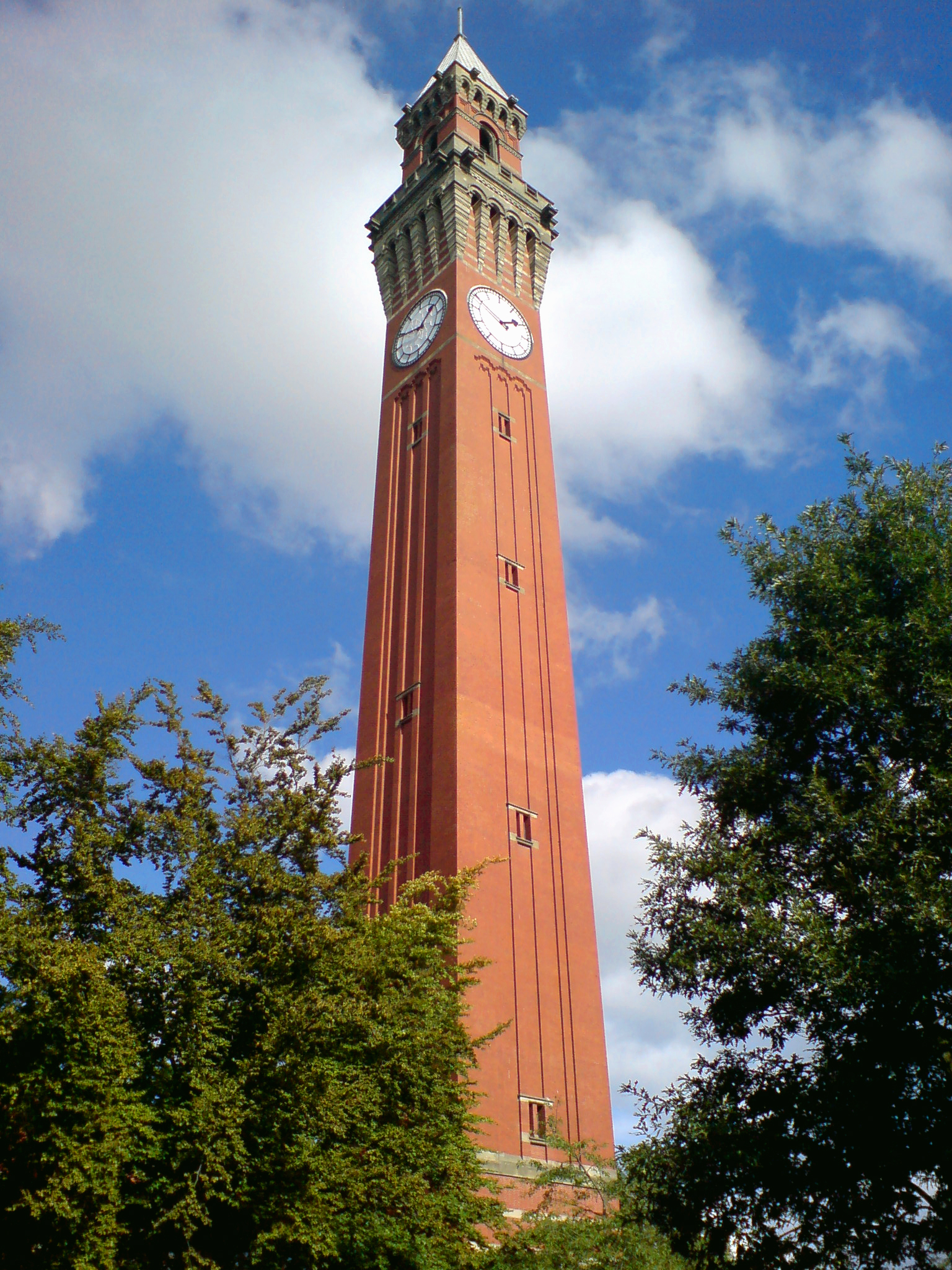
Joseph Chamberlain Memorial Clock Tower at the University of Birmingham

Winston Churchill called Chamberlain "a splendid piebald: first black, then white, or, in political terms, first fiery red, then true blue". That is the conventional view of Chamberlain's politics – that he became gradually more conservative, beginning to the left of the Liberal party and ending to the right of the Conservatives. An alternative view is that he was always a radical in home affairs and an imperialist in foreign affairs, and that those stances were not in great conflict with each other – with both he rejected "laissez-faire capitalism". For instance, after leaving the Liberals he remained a proponent of workmen's compensation and old-age pensions.

Historian J. A. R. Marriott says that in the 1870–1905 period Chamberlain was:

of all English statesman, the most representative and one of the most influential. Firmly convinced of the merits of parliamentary democracy, an ardent social reformer, though opposed to social revolution, above all, a whole-hearted believer in the Imperial mission of the British race, Chamberlain preeminently embodied the most vital of the most characteristic ideas of that epoch....[in Birmingham he was] A strong advocate of municipal enterprise, he stimulated the Corporation to purchase the gas-works, the water-works, the sewage farm, and by extensive scheme of slum clearance and rehousing, he transformed the outward aspect of the city is his adoption....[Once in Parliament,] from the [Liberal] Party point of view Chamberlain's support became increasingly indispensable but it was rendered with increasing reluctance.

Historian Dennis Judd says:

There is something so elemental and, in a way, timeless about the meteoric rise of Chamberlain: from his modest London Unitarian background, via his brilliant industrial and commercial career in Birmingham, to a position of almost supreme political power, where he could (and did) make and break the two major parties of late-Victorian and Edwardian England, destroy the immediate prospect of Irish Home Rule, reshape the British Empire, press for a restructuring of British economic policies and bestride the international stage as significantly as Rhodes or Bismarck.

Historian R. J. Q. Adams writes:

A great patriot who burned to guarantee his country's future, Chamberlain's brilliance and impatience guaranteed that he would be judged a political messiah to some, but an unstable destroyer to many more.

A. J. P. Taylor states:

Joseph Chamberlain was the greatest force in British politics between the decline of Gladstone and the rise of Lloyd George. He was a pioneer in social reform and municipal enterprise. He defeated Irish Home Rule. He inspired a new era in British Imperialism and directed its triumph in the Boer War... He challenged the accepted dogmas of Free Trade and launched the movement for Tariff Reform, which was to transform British economic life a generation after his death. Despite these achievements, nothing went right with him. He stands pre-eminent as a Splendid Failure... Chamberlain, it seems, was successful only in destruction, bringing ruin first to the Liberal, and then to the Unionist, party.

=== Memorials ===
He is commemorated by the large Chamberlain Memorial in Chamberlain Square, in central Birmingham, erected in 1880; and by the large cast-iron Chamberlain Clock in the city's Jewellery Quarter, erected in 1903 (in both cases, therefore, during his lifetime). His Birmingham home, Highbury Hall, is now a civic conference venue and a venue for civil marriages, and is open occasionally to the public. Highbury Hall is situated in Moseley, two kilometres from Winterbourne House and Garden which was commissioned as a family home for Chamberlain's niece Margaret by her husband John Nettlefold: Winterbourne is now owned by the University of Birmingham.

Midland Metro named an AnsaldoBreda T-69 tram in his honour. Joseph Chamberlain Sixth Form College in Birmingham is named after him. Chamberlain School, a pre-kindergarten-to-grade-12 public school in Grassy Lake, Alberta, Canada, is named in his honour: the name was chosen by William Salvage, a British immigrant and prosperous farmer, who donated land for its construction in 1910.

=== University of Birmingham ===
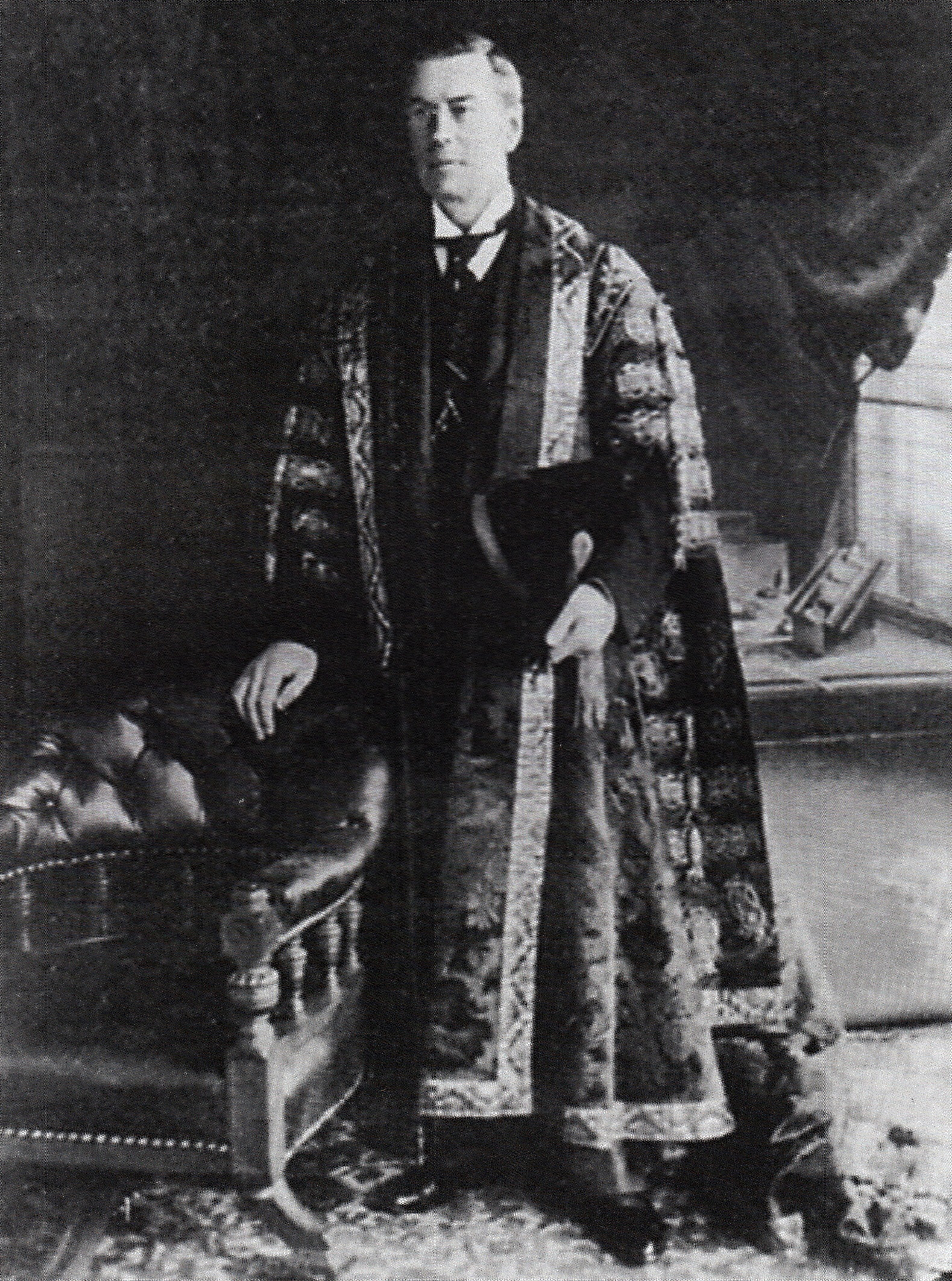
Joseph Chamberlain in the Chancellor's robes of Birmingham University

The University of Birmingham may be considered Chamberlain's most enduring legacy. He proposed the establishment of a university to complete his vision for the city, seeking to provide "a great school of universal instruction", so that "the most important work of original research should be continuously carried on under most favourable circumstances". He is regarded as the university's main founder and was its first chancellor. He was largely responsible for its gaining its royal charter in 1900, and for the development of the Edgbaston campus. The 100-metre tall Joseph Chamberlain Memorial Clock Tower ("Old Joe") is named in his honour and is the tallest free-standing clock tower in the world.

His papers are held at the Cadbury Research Library, University of Birmingham.

== Honours ==
- Honorary Freeman of the Worshipful Company of Grocers, 1 August 1902.

== Popular culture ==
- Chamberlain is depicted, along with local Cape politicians and notables, in the 1899 artwork Holiday Time in Cape Town by James Ford.
- Chamberlain was the subject of two parody novels based on Alice in Wonderland, Caroline Lewis's Clara in Blunderland (1902) and Lost in Blunderland (1903).
- Ernest Thesiger portrayed him in The Life Story of David Lloyd George
- Henry Hallett portrayed him in Victoria the Great and Sixty Glorious Years
- Gustaf Gründgens portrayed him in Ohm Kruger
- Chamberlain was portrayed by Basil Dignam in the 1972 Richard Attenborough film Young Winston
- G. K. Chesterton's anarchist society in The Man Who Was Thursday uses "Joseph Chamberlain" as their password.
- Is mention as a monocle user in Dorothy Sayers Lord Peter first novel "Whose Body"

== Books by him ==
- Joseph Chamberlain (1903). Imperial Union and Tariff Reform. G. Richards.
- Joseph Chamberlain (1885). The Radical Programme. Chapman and Hall.
- Joseph Chamberlain (1902). Mr. Chamberlain's Defence of the British Troops in South Africa against the foreign slanders. John Murray.

== Sources ==
- Browne, Harry (1974). Joseph Chamberlain: Radical and Imperialist. Longman Higher Education.
- Crosby, Travis L. (2011). Joseph Chamberlain: A Most Radical Imperialist. London: IB Tauris. ISBN 9781848857537.
- Dilks, David (1984). Neville Chamberlain. Cambridge Univ. Press.
- Ensor, Robert Charles Kirkwood (1936). England 1870-1914.
- Garvin, J. L.; Amery, Julian (1932). The Life of Joseph Chamberlain. London: Macmillan. (6 vols.; highly detailed with many letters, friendly to Chamberlain)
- Jay, Richard (1981). Joseph Chamberlain, A Political Study. Oxford Univ. Press.
- Judd, Denis (1977). Radical Joe: Life of Joseph Chamberlain. London: Hamish Hamilton. ISBN 0-241-89631-2.
- Mackintosh, Alexander (1914). Joseph Chamberlain: An Honest Biography (2nd ed.).
- Marsh, Peter T. (1994). Joseph Chamberlain: Entrepreneur in Politics. Yale Univ. Press.
- Marsh, Peter T. (2004). "Chamberlain, Joseph (1836–1914)". Oxford Dictionary of National Biography. Oxford Dictionary of National Biography (online ed.). Oxford University Press. doi:10.1093/ref:odnb/32350. (Subscription, Wikipedia Library access or UK public library membership required.)
- Massie, Robert K. (1992). Dreadnought: Britain, Germany, and the coming of the Great War. London: Jonathan Cape. ISBN 0-224-03260-7.
- Porter, Andrew N. (1980). The Origins of the South African War: Joseph Chamberlain & the Diplomacy of Imperialism, 1895–99. Manchester: Manchester University Press. ISBN 9780719007637.
- Ward, Roger (2015). The Chamberlains: Joseph, Austen and Neville, 1836–1940. Fonthill Media.

Parliament of the United Kingdom
Preceded by John Bright and Philip Henry Muntz and George Dixon	Member of Parliament for Birmingham; 1876–1885; With: John Bright and Philip Henry Muntz	Constituency divided
New constituency	Member of Parliament for Birmingham West; 1885–1914	Succeeded by Austen Chamberlain
Political offices
Preceded by Viscount Sandon	President of the Board of Trade; 1880–1885	Succeeded by The Duke of Richmond
Preceded by Arthur Balfour	President of the Local Government Board; 1886	Succeeded by James Stansfeld
Preceded by The Marquess of Ripon	Secretary of State for the Colonies; 1895–1903	Succeeded by Alfred Lyttelton
Preceded by Arthur Balfour	Leader of the Opposition in the Commons; 1906	Succeeded by Arthur Balfour
Party political offices
New post	President of the National Liberal Federation; 1877–1880?	Succeeded by Henry Fell Pease?
Academic offices
Preceded by John Eldon Gorst	Rector of the University of Glasgow; 1896–1899	Succeeded by Earl of Rosebery
New institution	Chancellor of the University of Birmingham; 1900–1914	Succeeded by Lord Robert Cecil
