= Chamberlain Memorial =

Memorial in Birmingham, England

Coordinates: 52°28′47.83″N 1°54′15.10″W

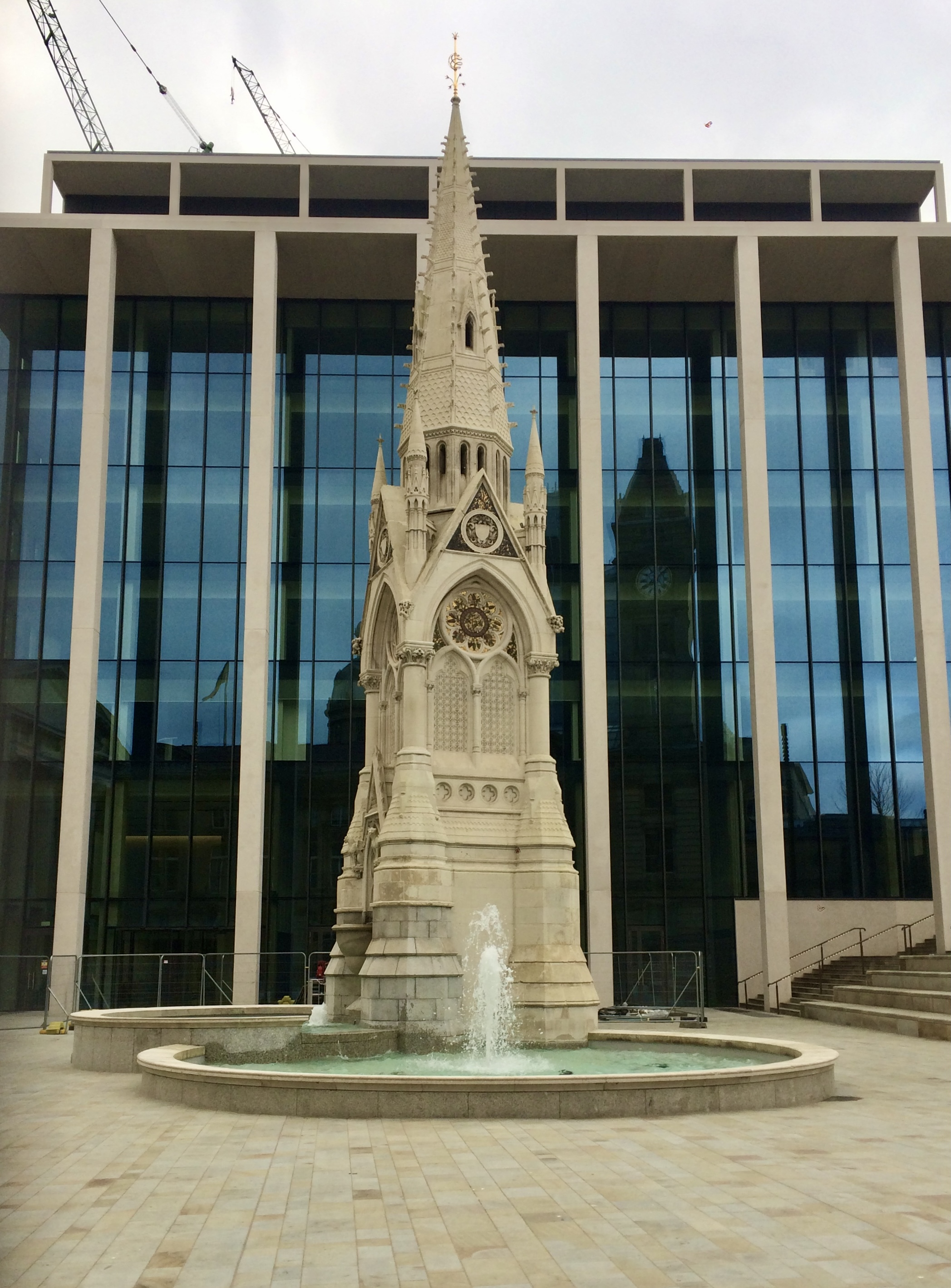
The Chamberlain Memorial and fountain

The Chamberlain Memorial, also known as the Chamberlain Memorial Fountain, is a monument in Chamberlain Square, Birmingham, England, erected in 1880 to commemorate the public service of Joseph Chamberlain (1836–1914), Birmingham businessman, councillor, mayor, Member of Parliament, and statesman. An inauguration ceremony was held on 20 October 1880, when Chamberlain himself was present.

== Construction ==
For the creation of the monument, £3,000 of public funds were raised. It was designed by the architect John Henry Chamberlain – no relation of the statesman, but a personal friend and himself a member of the Liberal elite who dominated civic life in Birmingham at this time. It is 65 feet (20 m) tall and in neo-Gothic style, reminiscent of the Albert Memorial. It bears a 50 centimetres (20 in) portrait medallion of Chamberlain by Thomas Woolner on the south side. The carvings of the capitals and the crocketted spire were done by Samuel Barfield of Leicester, John Henry Chamberlain's favourite sculptor. Salviati Burke and Co. of Venice were commissioned to do the mosaics after their success with the Birmingham Council House. It is Grade II listed.

== Completion ==
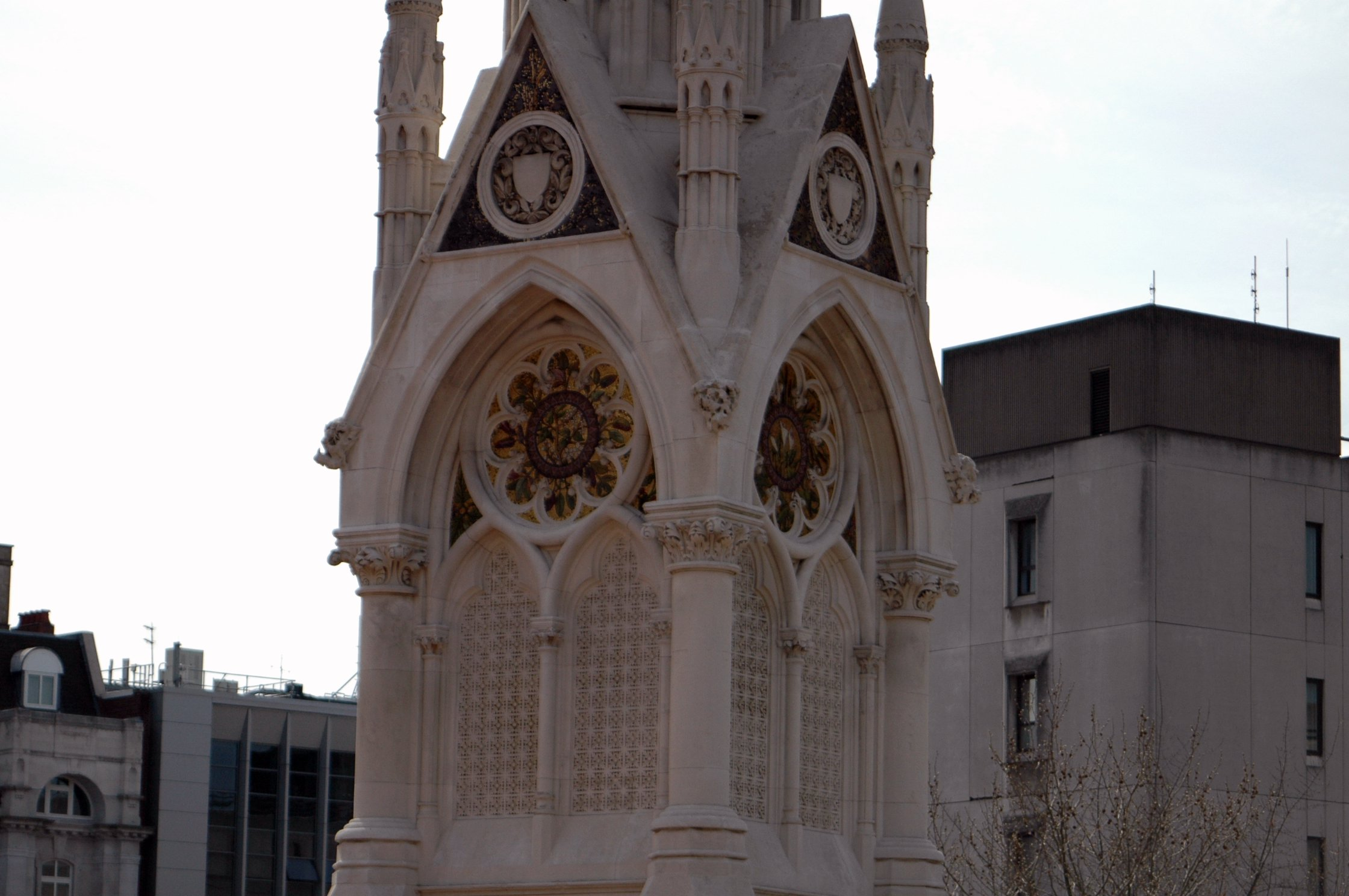
Details of the Chamberlain Memorial after being cleaned

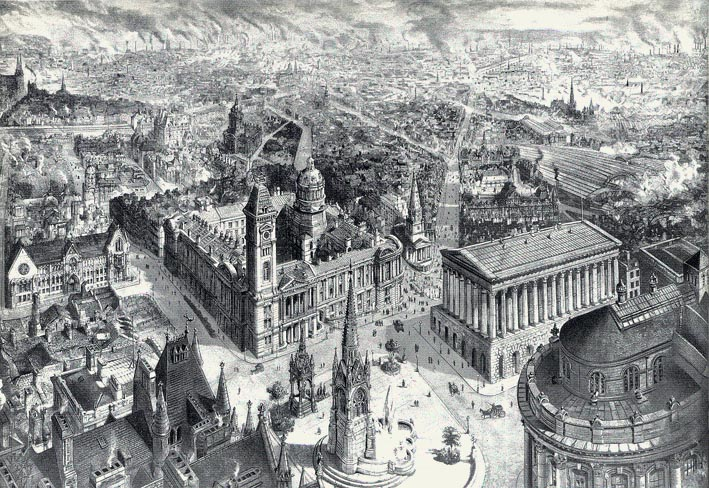
Bird's-eye view of Birmingham city centre in 1886, with the Chamberlain Memorial prominent in the foreground

The plaque on the monument reads:

This memorial is erected in gratitude for public service given to this town by Joseph Chamberlain who was elected Town Councillor in November 1869, Mayor in November 1873, and resigned that office in June 1876 on being returned as one of the representatives of the Borough of Birmingham in Parliament. And during whose Mayoralty many great public works were notably advanced. And mainly by whose ability & devotion the Gas & Water Undertakings were acquired for the town to the great and lasting benefit of the inhabitants.

Like the Chamberlain Memorial, the Chamberlain Clock (1903) in the centre of the Jewellery Quarter was also erected during Chamberlain's lifetime.

In the late 1960s, the pools around the fountain were removed, but in 1978, to celebrate their Diamond Jubilee, The Birmingham Civic Society designed and paid for the pools to be reinstated. The Portland stone spire underwent a major clean in 1994.

== Reception ==
Many sculptors and architects took to the memorial with dissatisfaction. John Roddis, a local sculptor, described it as "an architectural scarecrow" and "a hash of ornamental details". Nikolaus Pevsner also commented on the memorial in 1966 as an "ungainly combination of shapes".
