= Allenswood Boarding Academy =

Coordinates: 51.4432°N 0.2101°W

Allenswood Academy
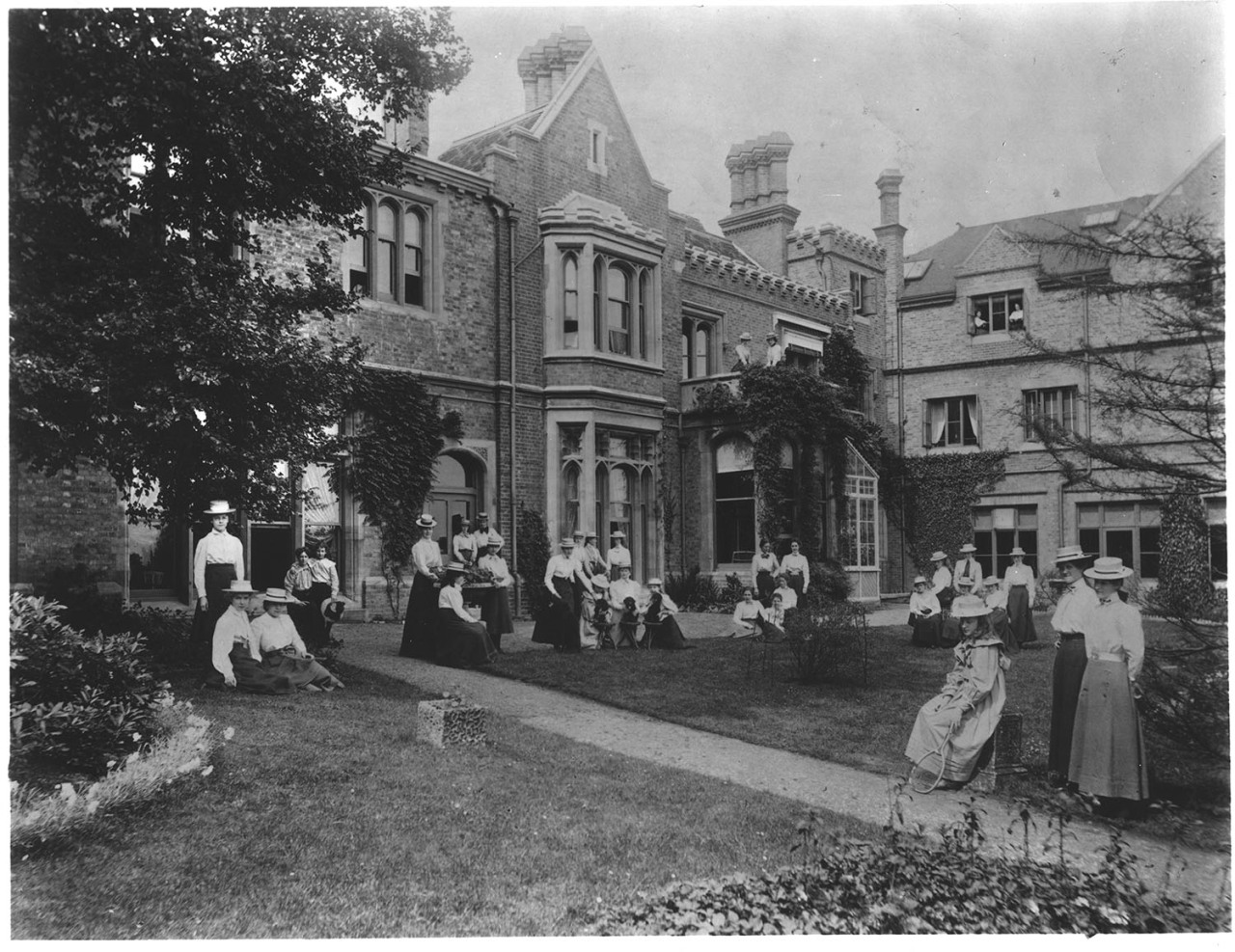
- The academy in 1902
- London; England

Information
- Type: Boarding
- Established: 1883
- Headmistress: Marie Souvestre
- Gender: Girls

Allenswood Boarding Academy (also known as Allenswood Academy or Allenswood School) was an exclusive girl's boarding school founded in Wimbledon, London, by Marie Souvestre in 1883 that operated until the early 1950s. Its facilities were then demolished and replaced with a housing development.

== History ==
Allenswood House was located on a large tract of land between Albert Drive and Wimbledon Park Road, in Southfields in the London Borough of Wandsworth, England. It was owned by Henry Hansler and was built in the Tudor Revival style between 1865 and 1870. The house was converted in 1883 by Marie Souvestre and her partner, Paolina Samaïa, into a boarding school for girls. The school, whose students were primarily from the European aristocracy and American upper-class, provided a progressive education to its students. Often called a finishing school, Allenswood had a curriculum that included serious study at a time when education was denied to women, and stressed feminist ideals of social responsibility and personal independence. In addition to learning French, which was the official language spoken at the school, students studied the arts, dance, history, language (English, German, and Italian), literature, music, and philosophy and were required to develop their own analytical skills to assess ideals and challenges.

When Souvestre died in 1905, Samaïa became the headmistress until 1909. She was succeeded by Florence Boyce and then in 1916, by Helen Gifford, one of Eleanor Roosevelt's classmates and Jeanne Dozat. Gifford and Dozat served as co-principals until 1922, when Gifford left to establish Benfleet Hall, a school based on Souvestre's model, in Benhill, Surrey. Dozat was later joined by Enid Michell, who remained as headmistress until the school closed in 1950.

== Redevelopment ==
The school had closed by the mid-1950s and the buildings burned down in the late 1950s. The London County Council and Wandsworth London Borough Council took possession of the site under compulsory purchase to develop the Wimbledon Park Estate. A housing development, known as Allenswood Estate, was created on the site.

== Noted faculty ==
- Frances Stevenson
- Dorothy Bussy, née Strachey

== Noted alumni ==
- Hilda Wynnefred Burkinshaw (1885–1962), who in 1908 married Cuthbert Collingwood Lloyd Fitzwilliams (a.k.a. C. C. L. Fitzwilliams), a Major in the Welsh Guards. She remained close to Roosevelt and in 1942 hosted a reunion in London of classmates in Roosevelt's honor.
- Beatrice Chamberlain
- Ethel Chamberlain
- Florence (Ida) Chamberlain
- Corinne Alsop Cole, née Robinson
- Sibyl, Lady Colefax, née Halsey
- Megan Lloyd George
- Eleanor Roosevelt
- Pernel Strachey, along with three of her sisters
- Pippa Strachey
- Mien van Wulfften Palthe, née Broese van Groenou
