= Marie Souvestre =

French educator (1830–1905)

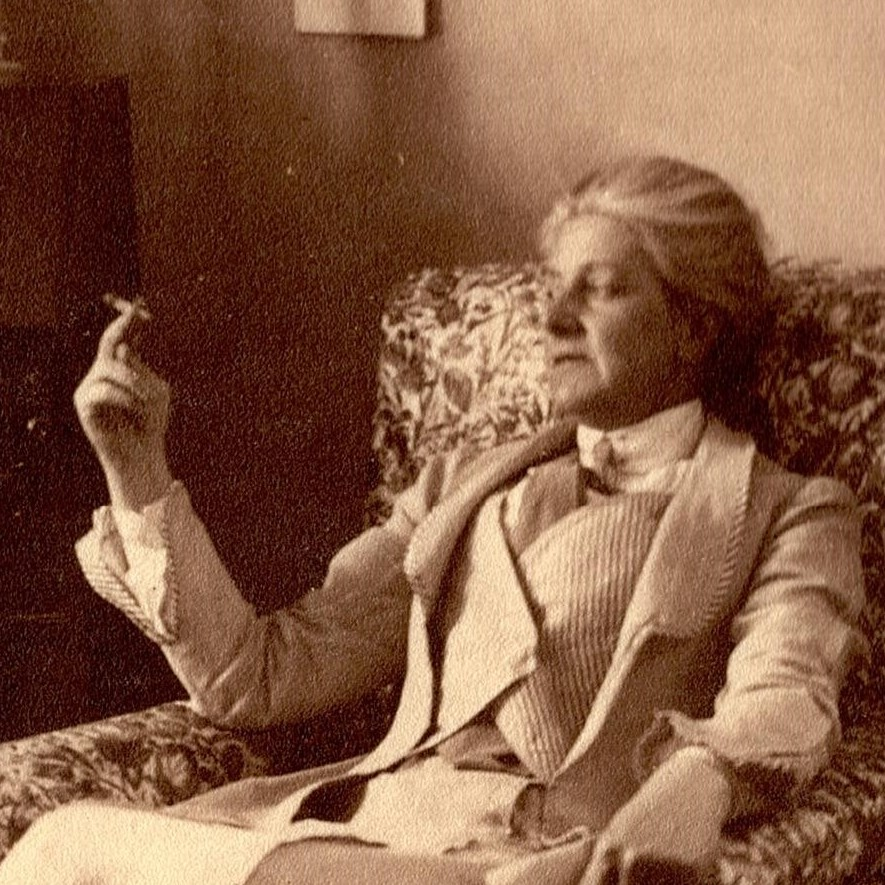
- Born: 28 May 1830; Brest, France
- Died: 30 March 1905 (aged 74)
- Occupation: Educator

Marie Souvestre (28 April 1830 – 30 March 1905) was an educator who sought to develop independent minds in young women. She founded a school in France and when she left the school with one of her teachers she founded Allenswood Academy in London.

== Life ==
She was born in Brest, France, the daughter of French novelist Émile Souvestre. She founded the girls' boarding schools Les Ruches ("the beehives") in Fontainebleau, France, where writer Natalie Clifford Barney and her sister Laura Clifford Barney were later educated, and Allenswood Boarding Academy, in Wimbledon, outside London, where her most famous pupil was Eleanor Roosevelt. Souvestre took a special interest in Roosevelt, who learned to speak French fluently and gained self-confidence. Roosevelt wished to continue at Allenswood, but in 1902 was summoned home by her grandmother to make her social debut. Roosevelt and Souvestre maintained a correspondence until March 1905, when Souvestre died. Subsequently, Roosevelt placed Souvestre's portrait on her desk and brought her letters with her every time she moved to a new home.

Dorothy Bussy, the sister of writer Lytton Strachey, anonymously published a novel, Olivia (1949), about her experience as a pupil at Les Ruches, describing the protagonist's crush on the headmistress Mlle. Julie (i.e., Souvestre). Bussy later taught Shakespeare at Allenswood.

A century after Souvestre's death, a biographer of Eleanor Roosevelt claimed Souvestre had been a lesbian. She founded Les Ruches with her partner Caroline Dussaut. Dussaut is Cara in Bussy's novel, Olivia. When they separated in 1883, Souvestre moved to England with Paolina Samaïa, former teacher at Les Ruches who would become a teacher at Allenswood Academy as well as, allegedly, Souvestre's long-term partner.
