= Sir Harry Vernon, 1st Baronet =

English politician

Harry Vernon
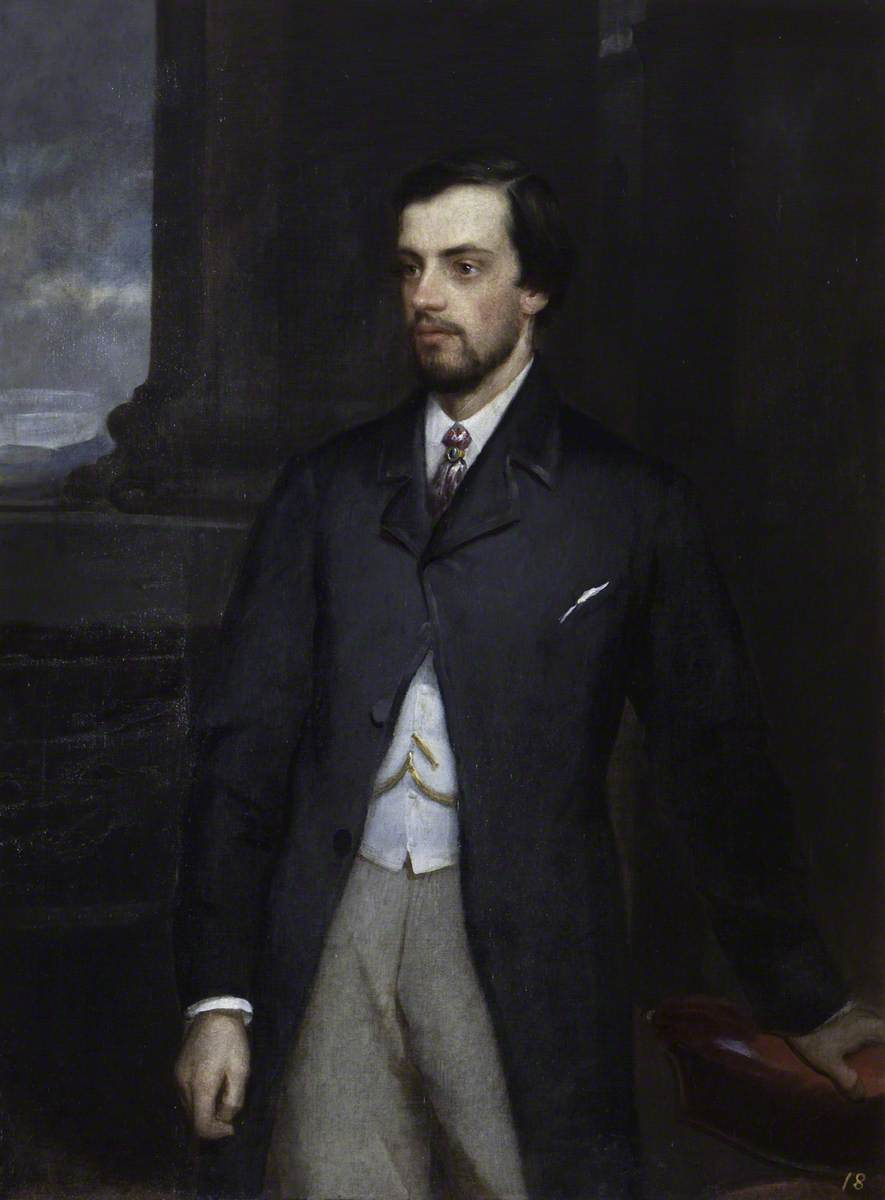

Member of Parliament for East Worcestershire
- In office 20 December 1861 – 25 November 1868 Serving with Charles Lytellton (June 1868–November 1868); Frederick Gough-Calthorpe (1861–1868)
- Preceded by: John Hodgetts-Foley; Frederick Gough-Calthorpe
- Succeeded by: Charles Lyttelton; Richard Amphlett

Personal details
- Born: 11 April 1834
- Died: 1 February 1920 (aged 85)
- Party: Liberal
- Spouse: Lady Georgina Sophia Baillie-Hamilton (m. 1861)
- Children: Three, including Bowater George Hamilton Vernon
- Parent(s): Thomas Taylor Vernon; Jessie Anna Letitia Foley

Sir Harry Foley Vernon, 1st Baronet (11 April 1834 – 1 February 1920) was a British Liberal Party politician.

== Early life ==
Born in 1834, Vernon was the son of Thomas Taylor and Jessie Anna Letitia (née Foley) Vernon.

== Career ==
Vernon was elected Liberal MP for East Worcestershire at a by-election in 1861—caused by the death of John Hodgetts-Foley—and held the seat until 1868 when he did not seek re-election.

Vernon was created a Baronet of Hanbury Hall in 1885, in recognition of the way he managed his estate during the Great Depression of British Agriculture.

== Personal life ==
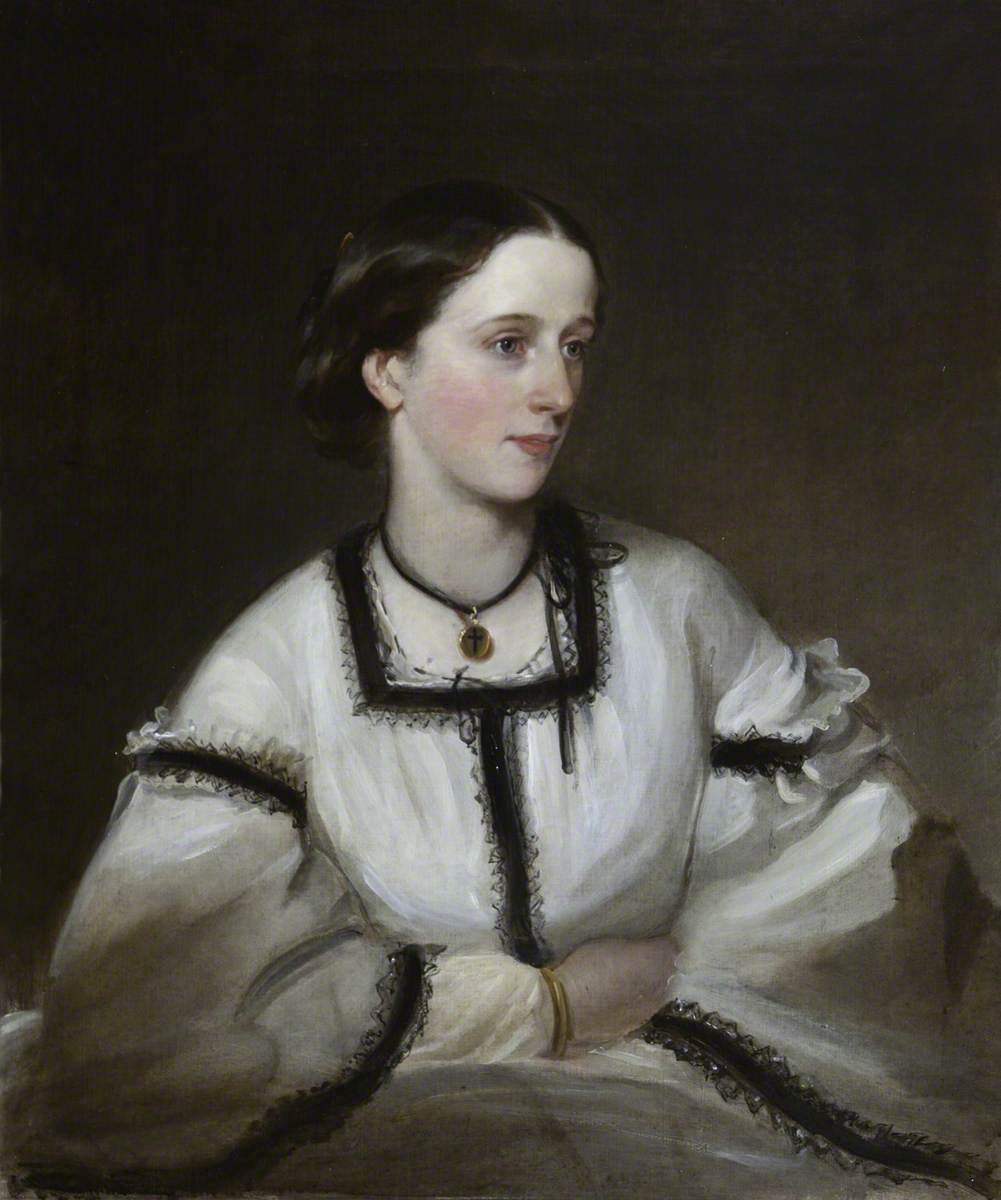
Portrait of Lady Georgina Sophia Baillie-Hamilton, between c. 1860 and c. 1870

In 1861, he married Lady Georgina Sophia Baillie-Hamilton, daughter of George and Georgina (née Markham) Baillie-Hamilton and they had at least three children: Auda Letitia (1862–1957); Bowater George Hamilton (1865–1940); and Herbert Edward (1867–1902).

Upon his death in 1920, his son, Bowater George Hamilton Vernon, succeeded to the title, after which it became extinct.

Parliament of the United Kingdom
Preceded by John Hodgetts-Foley; Frederick Gough-Calthorpe	Member of Parliament for East Worcestershire; 1861–1868; With: Charles Lyttelton (June 1868–November 1868); Frederick Gough-Calthorpe (1861–1868)	Succeeded by Charles Lyttelton; Richard Amphlett
Baronetage of the United Kingdom
New creation	Baronet (of Hanbury Hall); 1885–1920	Succeeded by Bowater George Hamilton Vernon
