= Edward Holland (MP) =

British Liberal Party politician

Edward Holland (12 February 1806 – 5 January 1875) was a British Liberal Party politician from Worcestershire.

He was elected at the 1835 general election as a Member of Parliament (MP) Member of Parliament for East Worcestershire, but was defeated at the 1837 election. He returned to the House of Commons after an 18-year absence when he was elected at a by-election in July 1855 as an MP for the borough of Evesham. He held that seat until he stood down at the 1868 general election, when the borough's representation was reduced to one seat.

He lived in the Vale of Evesham and ran a model farm at Dumbleton in Gloucestershire. He was at various points president of the Royal Agricultural Society, High Sheriff of Worcestershire and deputy lieutenant of Gloucestershire.

He was a second cousin of Charles Darwin and of Emma Darwin.

Parliament of the United Kingdom
Preceded by William Congreve Russell; Thomas Cookes	Member of Parliament for East Worcestershire; 1835 – 1837; With: Thomas Cookes	Succeeded by Horace St Paul; John Barneby
Preceded by Grenville Berkeley; Sir Henry Willoughby, Bt	Member of Parliament for Evesham; 1855 – 1868; With: Sir Henry Willoughby, Bt to 1865; James Bourne from 1865	Succeeded by James Bourne
