= 1892 East Worcestershire by-election =

UK parliamentary by-election

The 1892 East Worcestershire by-election was a parliamentary by-election held for the UK House of Commons constituency of East Worcestershire on 30 March 1892.

== Vacancy ==
The by-election was caused by the expulsion from Parliament of the sitting Liberal Unionist MP, George Hastings. Hastings had held the seat since 1880, first as a Liberal but after 1886 as a Liberal Unionist. In March 1892 he pleaded guilty at the Old Bailey to an indictment accusing him of misappropriating trust money in his charge. As a Trustee for property under the will of a Major John Brown, he had appropriated over £20,000 from the estate. This left the children of Major Brown a sum of around £7,000. In his summing up the judge, Mr Justice A L Smith, said that Hastings’ actions had left the four children of Major Brown “on the verge of want”. He then sentenced Hastings to a term of five years penal servitude. By a motion put to the House of Commons on 21 March 1892 by Arthur Balfour, in his role as Leader of the House it was agreed to expel Hastings from Parliament.

== Candidates ==
As a Liberal Unionist seat, it was a matter of importance to the party that one of its men should be selected to fight the by-election in the Unionist interest. This was against the background of a number of Liberal Unionist disputes with the Conservatives over candidate selection in the Birmingham area going back some years. Joseph Chamberlain was keen to ensure a Liberal Unionist candidate to shore up his position vis-a-vis the Tories on his home patch, particularly as his family residence, Highbury Hall fell just within the northern boundary of the East Worcestershire seat. More importantly perhaps, his son Austen Chamberlain had recently been approved as Unionist candidate for the seat.

The Conservatives were however unwilling to concede the seat, at least without some attempt to impose conditions. The Chairman of the local Conservative Association, Victor Milward, tried to insist that Chamberlain must pledge to oppose any move towards disestablishment of the Church of England. But this would not have played well with many former Liberal voters, coming from the nonconformist tradition, who now supported the Liberal Unionists. It was also pointed out that if the Tories were insisting on Liberal Unionists opposing disestablishment to gain their backing as candidates, pledges in favour of disestablishment might be asked of Conservatives by their Liberal Unionist allies in future disputed contests. In the end the Conservatives felt they could not force their opinions on Chamberlain and supported his candidacy.

The Liberals had not opposed Hastings at the last election and evidently had no candidate in the field or poised to enter the fray. Chamberlain was nominated ten times from each district within the constituency, each nomination being signed by five Liberal Unionists and five Conservatives. There being no other nominations, Chamberlain was returned unopposed.

== Result ==
East Worcestershire by-election, 1892
Party	Candidate	Votes	%	±%
Liberal Unionist	Austen Chamberlain	Unopposed	N/A	N/A
Liberal Unionist hold				

== See also ==
- List of United Kingdom by-elections
- United Kingdom by-election records
- 1902 East Worcestershire by-election
