= James Arthur Taylor =

British Conservative politician

Member of Parliament for East Worcestershire
- In office 12 July 1841 – 7 August 1847 Serving with George Rushout (Jan. 1847–Jul. 1847); John Barneby (1841–Jan. 1847)
- Preceded by: Horace St Paul; John Barneby
- Succeeded by: John Hodgetts-Foley; George Rushout

Personal details
- Born: 18 June 1817
- Died: 14 June 1889 (aged 71)
- Party: Conservative

James Arthur Taylor (18 June 1817 – 14 June 1889) was a British Conservative politician.

Taylor was the eldest son of James Taylor of Moseley Hall, Moseley, Worcestershire and Louisa née Skeye, daughter of Samuel Skeye of Spring Grove, Worcestershire. He was first educated at Winchester School, and was admitted as a pensioner and then matriculated at Trinity College, Cambridge in 1835 and 1836 respectively.

He was elected Conservative MP for East Worcestershire at the 1841 general election and held the seat until 1847 when he did not seek re-election.

In 1843, he married Maria Theresa Rush, daughter of George Rush of Ellenham Hall, Northamptonshire. He was also a member of the Carlton Club and the Oxford and Cambridge Club.

Parliament of the United Kingdom
Preceded by Horace St Paul; John Barneby	Member of Parliament for East Worcestershire; 1837–1847; With: George Rushout (Jan. 1847–Jul. 1847); John Barneby (1841–Jan. 1847)	Succeeded by John Hodgetts-Foley; George Rushout
