= Thomas Cookes =

Thomas Cookes may refer to:

- Sir Thomas Cookes, 2nd Baronet (1648–1701), English philanthropist
- Thomas Cookes (MP) (1804–1900), English politician
