= 1914 Birmingham West by-election =

UK Parliamentary by-election

The 1914 Birmingham West by-election was held on 14 July 1914. The by-election was held due to the death of the incumbent Conservative MP, Joseph Chamberlain. It was won by his son the Conservative candidate Austen Chamberlain, who was elected unopposed. Austen had resigned as MP for East Worcestershire in order to stand in Birmingham West, prompting a by-election in that constituency as well, which was held two days later.
