= John Barneby =

British politician

Member of Parliament for East Worcestershire
- In office 4 August 1837 – 30 November 1846 Serving with James Arthur Taylor (1841–1847); Horace St Paul (1837–1841)
- Preceded by: Edward Holland; Thomas Cookes
- Succeeded by: James Arthur Taylor; George Rushout

Member of Parliament for Droitwich
- In office 9 January 1835 – 24 July 1837
- Preceded by: John Hodgetts-Foley
- Succeeded by: John Pakington

Personal details
- Born: 20 November 1799
- Died: 30 November 1846 (aged 47)
- Party: Conservative

John Barneby (20 November 1799 – 30 November 1846) was a British Conservative politician.

He was elected Conservative MP for Droitwich at the 1835 general election, and then for East Worcestershire at the 1837 general election and held the seat until his death in 1846.

He was a member of the Carlton Club, Boodle's and Arthur's.

Parliament of the United Kingdom
Preceded by John Hodgetts-Foley	Member of Parliament for Droitwich; 1837–1837	Succeeded by John Pakington
Preceded by Edward Holland; Thomas Cookes	Member of Parliament for East Worcestershire; 1837–1847; With: James Arthur Taylor (1841–1847); Horace St Paul (1837–1841)	Succeeded by James Arthur Taylor; George Rushout
