= 1914 East Worcestershire by-election =

UK Parliamentary by-election

The 1914 East Worcestershire by-election was held on 16 July 1914. The by-election was held due to the resignation in order for the incumbent Conservative MP, Austen Chamberlain, to fight a by-election in Birmingham West. It was won unopposed by the Conservative candidate Frederick Leverton Harris.
