= William Congreve Russell =

William Congreve Russell (15 April 1778 – 1850) was a Whig politician in England.

Russell was the son of Thomas Russell of Moor Green, Moseley, Worcestershire (now Birmingham), and Mary Garner, his second wife. He was appointed as a captain when the North Worcestershire Volunteers were established in September 1803. On 19 July 1820, he married Elizabeth Mary Hopper (d. 27 June 1821), by whom he had one daughter:

- Elizabeth Mary Russell, married in 1839 to Joseph Bailey

He was elected at the 1832 general election as one of the two Members of Parliament (MP) for East Worcestershire, and held the seat until he stood down at the 1835 general election.

He was also High Sheriff of Worcestershire in 1839. Kings Heath Park was made for him.

Parliament of the United Kingdom
New constituency	Member of Parliament for East Worcestershire; 1832–1835; With: Thomas Cookes	Succeeded by Thomas Cookes; Edward Holland
Honorary titles
Preceded by Robert Berkeley	High Sheriff of Worcestershire; 1839	Succeeded by James Foster
