= Richard Amphlett =

English barrister and Conservative politician

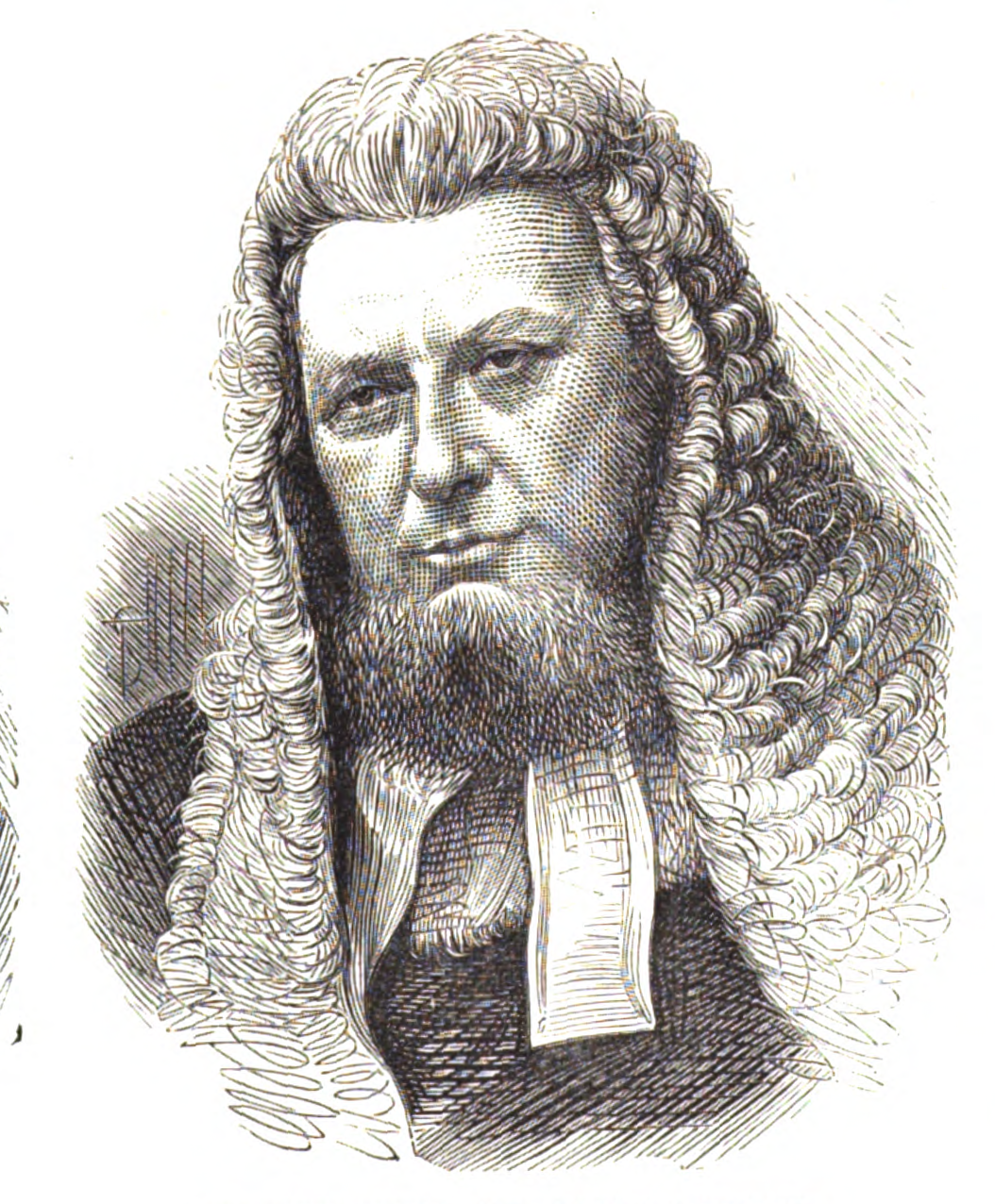
- Born: 24 May 1809; Quatt
- Died: 7 December 1883; London
- Occupations: Politician, judge

Sir Richard Paul Amphlett DL JP (24 May 1809 – 7 December 1883) was an English barrister and Conservative politician who sat in the House of Commons from 1868 to 1874.

Amphlett was the eldest of five sons of Rev. Richard Holmden Amphlett of Wychbold Hall, Hadzor, near Droitwich, and his first wife Sarah Paul, daughter of Nathaniel Paul of Bloomsbury Square, London. His father was the lord of the manor and rector of Hadzor, Worcestershire, of a gentry family anciently of Salwarpe in that county. Amphlett was educated at Brewood Grammar School and at Peterhouse, Cambridge, graduating BA as 6th wrangler in 1831 and MA in 1834. He became a Fellow of his college and was also called to the bar at Lincoln's Inn in June 1834. He practised at the Chancery Bar and was appointed Queen's Counsel in 1858 and was also Bencher of his Inn. He was deputy lieutenant and J.P. for Worcestershire and deputy chairman of Worcestershire Quarter Sessions.

In 1859, Amphlett stood unsuccessfully for parliament at Lewes. At the 1868 general election, Amphlett was elected member of parliament for East Worcestershire and held the seat until 1874.

In 1873, Amphlett was serjeant-at-law and president of the Legal Education Association. He was knighted in June 1874. From 1874 to 1876, he was a Baron of the Exchequer and was made a Privy Councillor in 1876. From 1876 to 1877, he was Lord Justice of Appeal and retired on account of ill-health.

He died at 32 Wimpole Street, London, at the age of 74, and was buried at Hadzor., having married twice: in 1840 to Frances, daughter of Edward Ferrard of St. Ives, Yorkshire, and secondly in 1880 to Sarah Amelia, daughter of Mr C Martin of Belvedere, Hampshire. He left no children.

Parliament of the United Kingdom
Preceded by Harry Vernon; Hon. Charles Lyttelton	Member of Parliament for East Worcestershire; 1868 – 1874; With: Hon. Charles Lyttelton	Succeeded by Henry Allsopp; Thomas Eades Walker
