= Hazel Hastings =

Canadian teacher & Roman Catholic laywoman (1897-1993)

- Born: Hazel Mary Daunais; November 8, 1897; Battleford, Saskatchewan, Canada
- Died: January 27, 1993 (aged 95); Oxford, Oxfordshire, England
- Occupation: English teacher
- Spouse: Major William George Warren Hastings
- Children: 6

Hazel Mary Hastings born Hazel Mary Daunais (November 8, 1897 – January 27, 1993) was a Canadian teacher and Roman Catholic laywoman.

== Life ==
Hastings was born in Battleford in 1897. She had an unusual childhood as her father died in 1901 and her mother decided to be a nun when she was five and she was placed in the convent's small school where the students wore habits and veils. She left there in 1911 and was sent to a convent in France for two years to improve her French. She was later known for her love of precise language.

Shw worked in England during the war and in 1919 she quickly met, married and left for Malaya with Major William George Warren Hastings. Her husband was a lawyer and the son of George Woodyatt Hastings, a disgraced former member of parliament. They had five of their six children in Malaya where she became a deputy commissioner for the Girl Guides. She returned to England in 1930 unhappy with colonial life while her husband remained in Malaya.

In 1938 she moved to a flat in Oxford where she enjoyed the diversity of people and her friends included Willie and Hans Schenk, German prisoners-of-war, and Penelope Betjeman.

In 1952 her life was transformed after her husband died and she decided to move to Uganda where three of her children lived. She became a teacher of English at Bukalasa seminary. She returned to Europe via a job in Zambia ending up in Lisbon, then Rome and then Offenburg in the Black Forest aged 75. All the time she was teaching English but she was disappointed that she could not pick up the German language. Aged eighty she moved to Scotland to assist her son and she died back in Oxford after a few years living with her daughter in 1993.
