= 1902 East Worcestershire by-election =

UK parliamentary by-election

The 1902 East Worcestershire by-election was a parliamentary by-election held for the UK House of Commons constituency of East Worcestershire on 15 August 1902.

== Vacancy ==
Under the provisions of the Succession to the Crown Act 1707 and a number of subsequent Acts, MPs appointed to certain ministerial and legal offices were at this time required to seek re-election. The by-election in East Worcestershire was caused by the appointment on 8 August 1902 of the sitting Liberal Unionist MP, Austen Chamberlain as Postmaster General.

== Candidates ==
Chamberlain, who had held the seat since being returned unopposed at a by-election on 30 March 1892 was selected to defend his seat in the Liberal Unionist interest. The Liberal Party in the constituency had not been active for some years at Parliamentary level. Chamberlain had not been opposed at the general elections of 1895 or 1900. The Liberals had no candidate in the field and it was not expected that any other hopefuls would enter the fray.

== Result ==
There being no other nominations, Chamberlain was therefore returned unopposed on 15 August 1902. The nomination took place at Bromsgrove Town Hall with Chamberlain present, and after the election he addressed the assembled crowd, thanking them for confidence and support.

East Worcestershire by-election, 1902
Party	Candidate	Votes	%	±%
Liberal Unionist	Austen Chamberlain	Unopposed	N/A	N/A
Liberal Unionist hold				

== See also ==
- List of United Kingdom by-elections
- United Kingdom by-election records
