= Thomas Eades Walker =

Thomas Eades Walker MP

Member of Parliament for East Worcestershire
- In office 16 February 1874 – 14 April 1880 Serving with Henry Allsopp
- Preceded by: Richard Amphlett; Charles Lyttelton
- Succeeded by: William Henry Gladstone; George Hastings

Personal details
- Born: 24 February 1843
- Died: 13 January 1899 (aged 55)
- Party: Conservative

Thomas Eades Walker (24 February 1843 – 13 January 1899) was a British Conservative politician.

Walker first stood for election in Wednesbury in 1868, but was unsuccessful. He was then elected MP for East Worcestershire in 1874 but did not stand for re-election at the next election in 1880.

He was born John Thomas Eades Walker - he used only the second and third of his Christian names - at Wednesbury where his father, a self-made man, built up a very large business manufacturing axles for railway rolling stock. Unfortunately both father and son lived in considerable style far beyond their incomes. Popularly known as 'Tapioca Tom', Thomas Eades Walker was well known for a few years on the Turf and owned a winner of the 1000 Guineas Stakes. Effectively hopelessly insolvent for many years he was bankrupted in 1892. He died in London in very reduced circumstances.

Parliament of the United Kingdom
Preceded by Richard Amphlett; Charles Lyttelton	Member of Parliament for East Worcestershire; 1874 – 1880; With: Henry Allsopp	Succeeded by William Henry Gladstone; George Hastings
