= Austen Chamberlain =

British politician (1863–1937)

The Right Honourable Sir Austen Chamberlain KG
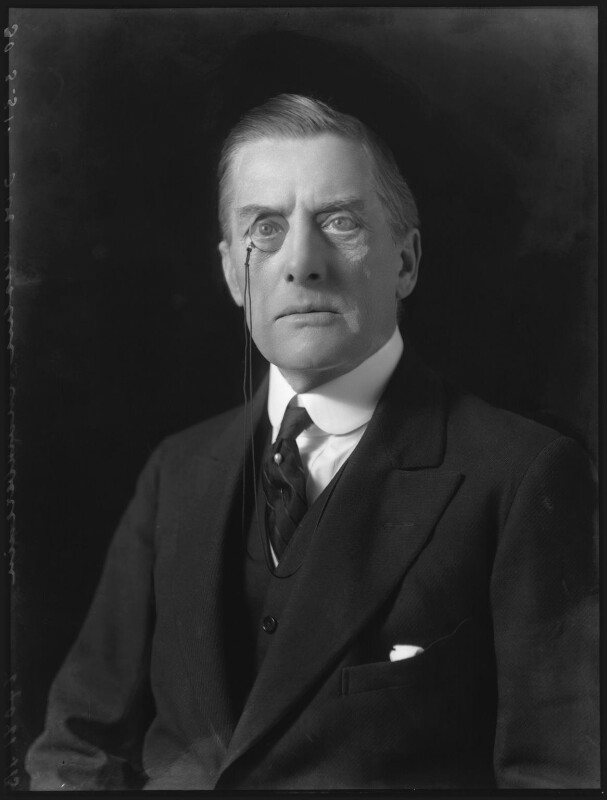
- Chamberlain in 1931

First Lord of the Admiralty
- In office 24 August 1931 – 5 November 1931
- Prime Minister: Ramsay MacDonald
- Preceded by: A. V. Alexander
- Succeeded by: Sir Bolton Eyres-Monsell

Foreign Secretary
- In office 3 November 1924 – 4 June 1929
- Prime Minister: Stanley Baldwin
- Preceded by: Ramsay MacDonald
- Succeeded by: Arthur Henderson

Lord Privy Seal Leader of the House of Commons
- In office 1 April 1921 – 23 October 1922
- Prime Minister: David Lloyd George
- Preceded by: Bonar Law
- Succeeded by: Lord Robert Cecil

Chancellor of the Exchequer
- In office 9 October 1903 – 4 December 1905
- Prime Minister: Arthur Balfour
- Preceded by: Charles Thomson Ritchie
- Succeeded by: H. H. Asquith
- In office 10 January 1919 – 1 April 1921
- Prime Minister: David Lloyd George
- Preceded by: Bonar Law
- Succeeded by: Sir Robert Horne

Secretary of State for India
- In office 25 May 1915 – 17 July 1917
- Prime Minister: H. H. Asquith; David Lloyd George
- Preceded by: The 1st Marquess of Crewe
- Succeeded by: Edwin Montagu

Postmaster General
- In office 11 August 1902 – 9 October 1903
- Prime Minister: Arthur Balfour
- Preceded by: The 6th Marquess of Londonderry
- Succeeded by: Lord Stanley

Member of Parliament for Birmingham West
- In office 14 July 1914 – 16 March 1937
- Preceded by: Joseph Chamberlain
- Succeeded by: Walter Higgs

Member of Parliament for East Worcestershire
- In office 30 March 1892 – 7 July 1914
- Preceded by: George Hastings
- Succeeded by: Leverton Harris

Personal details
- Born: Joseph Austen Chamberlain; 16 October 1863 Birmingham, England
- Died: 16 March 1937 (aged 73) London, England
- Party: Liberal Unionist; Conservative
- Spouse: Ivy Muriel Dundas (m. 1906)
- Children: 3
- Parent(s): Joseph Chamberlain; Harriet Kenrick
- Education: Rugby School; Trinity College, Cambridge; Sciences Po; University of Berlin

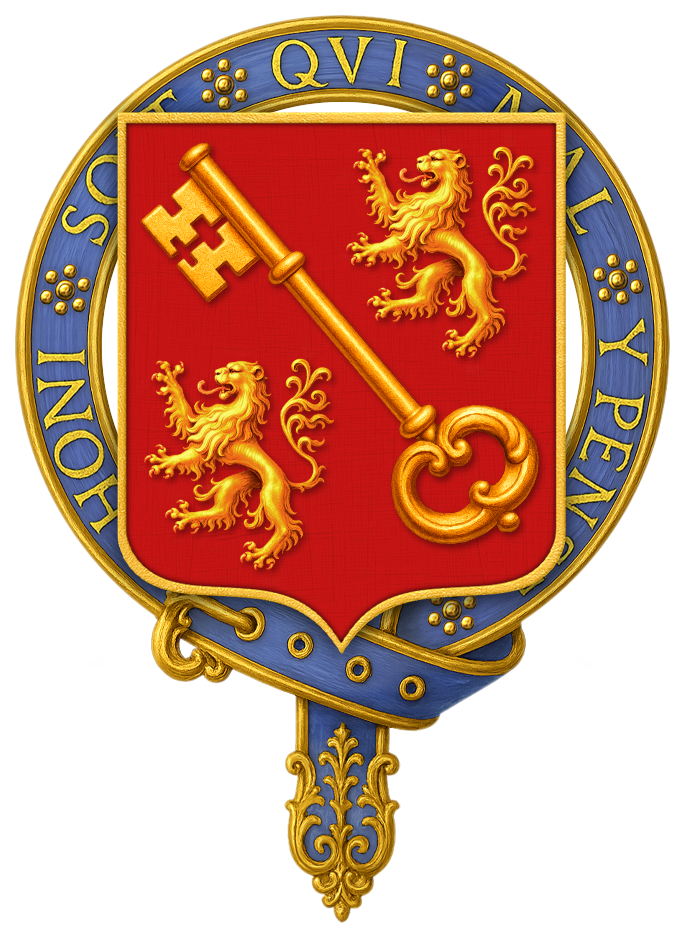
Garter-encircled shield of Arms of Sir Joseph Austen Chamberlain, KG

Sir Joseph Austen Chamberlain KG (16 October 1863 – 16 March 1937) was a British statesman, Nobel Peace Prize winner, son of Joseph Chamberlain and older half-brother of Prime Minister Neville Chamberlain. He served as a Member of Parliament (MP) for 45 years, as Chancellor of the Exchequer (twice) and was briefly Conservative Party leader before serving as Foreign Secretary.

Brought up to be the political heir of his father, whom he physically resembled, he was elected to Parliament as a Liberal Unionist at a by-election in 1892. He held office in the Unionist coalition governments of 1895–1905, remaining in the Cabinet as Chancellor of the Exchequer (1903–05) after his father resigned in 1903 to campaign for Tariff Reform. After his father's disabling stroke in 1906, Austen became the leading tariff reformer in the House of Commons. Late in 1911 he and Walter Long were due to compete for the leadership of the Conservative Party (in succession to Arthur Balfour), but both withdrew in favour of Bonar Law rather than risk a party split on a close result.

Chamberlain returned to office in H. H. Asquith's wartime coalition government in May 1915, as Secretary of State for India, but resigned to take responsibility for the disastrous Kut Campaign. He again returned to office in David Lloyd George's coalition government, once again serving as Chancellor of the Exchequer. He then served as Conservative Party leader in the Commons (1921–1922), before resigning after the Carlton Club meeting voted to end the Lloyd George Coalition.

Like many leading coalitionists, he did not hold office in the Conservative governments of 1922–1924. By now regarded as an elder statesman, he served an important term as Foreign Secretary in Stanley Baldwin's second government (1924–1929). He negotiated the Locarno Treaties (1925), aimed at preventing war between France and Germany, for which he was awarded the Nobel Peace Prize. Chamberlain last held office as First Lord of the Admiralty in 1931, but resigned as a result of his actions over the Invergordon Mutiny. He was one of the few MPs supporting Winston Churchill's appeals for rearmament against the German threat in the 1930s and remained an active backbench MP until his death in 1937.

== Early life ==
Austen Chamberlain was born in Birmingham, the second child and eldest son of Joseph Chamberlain, then a rising industrialist and political radical, later Mayor of Birmingham and a dominant figure in Liberal and Unionist politics at the end of the 19th century. His father and mother, the former Harriet Kenrick had a baby daughter Beatrice Chamberlain who would become an educationalist. Harriet died giving birth to Austen, leaving his father so shaken that for almost 25 years he maintained a distance from his first-born son. In 1868, his father married Harriet's cousin, Florence, and had further children, the oldest of whom, Neville, would become Prime Minister in the year of Austen's death.

Austen was dominated by his elder sister and was therefore sent away to be educated first at Rugby School "to release him from her thrall", before passing on to Trinity College, Cambridge. While at Trinity College, he became a lifelong friend of F. S. Oliver, a future advocate of Imperial Federation and, after 1909, a prominent member of the Round Table movement. Chamberlain made his first political address in 1884 at a meeting of the university's Political Society and was vice-president of the Cambridge Union.

It would seem that from an early age his father had intended for politics to be Austen's future path, and with that in mind, he was sent first to France, where he studied at the Paris Institute of Political Studies and developed a lasting admiration for the French people and culture. For nine months, he was shown the brilliance of Paris under the Third Republic, and he met and dined with the likes of Georges Clemenceau and Alexandre Ribot.

From Paris, Austen was sent to Berlin for twelve months, to imbibe the political culture of the other great European power, Germany. Though in his letters home to Beatrice and Neville, he showed an obvious preference for France and the lifestyle he had left behind there, Chamberlain undertook to learn German and learn from his experience in the capital of the German Empire. Among others, Austen met and dined with the "Iron Chancellor", Otto von Bismarck, an experience that was to hold a special place in his heart for the duration of his life.

While attending the University of Berlin, Austen developed a suspicion of the growing nationalism in Germany based upon his experience of the lecturing style of Heinrich von Treitschke, who opened up to him "a new side of the German character – a narrow-minded, proud, intolerant Prussian chauvinism", the consequences of which he was later to ponder during the First World War and the crises of the 1930s.

== Early career ==
=== Member of Parliament ===
Austen returned to England in 1888, lured largely by the prize of a parliamentary constituency. He was first elected to parliament as a member of his father's own Liberal Unionist Party in 1892, sitting for the seat of East Worcestershire. Owing to the prominence of his father and the alliance between the anti-Home Rule Liberal Unionists and Conservatives, Chamberlain was returned unopposed on 30 March, and at the first sitting of the new session, he walked up the floor of the house flanked by his father and his uncle, Richard.

Owing to the dissolution of parliament and the 1892 general election that August, Chamberlain was unable to make his maiden speech until April 1893, but, when delivered, it was acclaimed by the four-time prime minister William Ewart Gladstone as "one of the best speeches which has been made". That Chamberlain was speaking against Gladstone's own Second Home Rule Bill does not seem to have dampened the enthusiasm of the Prime Minister, who responded by publicly congratulating both Austen and his father, Joseph, on such an excellent performance. That was highly significant, given the bad blood existing between Joseph Chamberlain and his former leader.

=== Political office ===
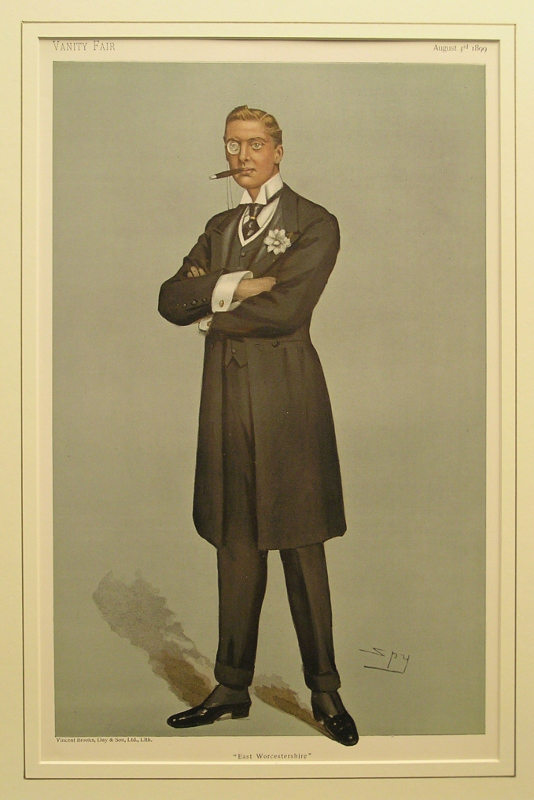
Chamberlain caricatured by Spy for Vanity Fair, 1899.

Appointed a junior Whip of the Liberal Unionists after the general election, Austen's main role was to act as his father's "standard bearer" in matters of policy. Following the Conservative and Unionist landslide win in the election of 1895, Chamberlain was appointed Civil Lord of the Admiralty, holding that post until 1900, when he became Financial Secretary to the Treasury. Lord Salisbury retired as prime minister in July 1902, and the following month Chamberlain was promoted to the position of Postmaster General by the new premier, the Conservative Arthur Balfour, who also designated this a cabinet position, and appointed him to the Privy Council.

In the wake of the struggle between his father and Balfour, Austen Chamberlain became Chancellor of the Exchequer in 1903. Austen's appointment was largely a compromise solution to the bitter division of the two Unionist heavyweights, which threatened to split the coalition between supporters of Chamberlain's Imperial Tariff campaign and Balfour's more cautious advocacy of protectionism. While Austen supported his father's programme, his influence within the cabinet was diminished following the departure of the senior Chamberlain to the backbenches. Facing a resurgent Liberal opposition and the threat of an internal party split, Balfour eventually took the Unionists into opposition in December 1905, and in the ensuing rout in the election of 1906, Austen found himself one of the few surviving Liberal Unionists in the House of Commons.

After his father's stroke and enforced retirement from active politics a few months later, Austen became the effective leader of the tariff reform campaign within the Unionist Party, and thus, he was a contender for the eventual leadership of the party itself.

== Leadership questions ==
With the Unionists in disarray after electoral defeats at both the January and December 1910 elections, Balfour was forced from his position as party leader in November 1911. Chamberlain was one of the leading candidates to succeed as Conservative leader even though he was still technically a member of the Liberal Unionist wing of the coalition (the two parties merged formally only in 1912).

Chamberlain was opposed by Canadian-born Bonar Law, Walter Long and Irish Unionist Edward Carson.

Given their standing in the party, only Chamberlain and Long had a realistic chance of success and though Balfour had intended Chamberlain to succeed him, it became clear from an early canvass of the sitting MPs that Long would be elected by a slender margin.

After a short period of internal party campaigning, Chamberlain determined to withdraw from the contest for the good of the still-divided party. He succeeded in persuading Long to withdraw with him in favour of Law, who was subsequently chosen by unanimous vote as a compromise candidate.

Chamberlain's action, while it prevented him from attaining the party leadership and, arguably, the premiership, did a great deal to maintain unity within the Conservative and Liberal Unionist parties at a time of great uncertainty and strain.

== Irish Home Rule ==
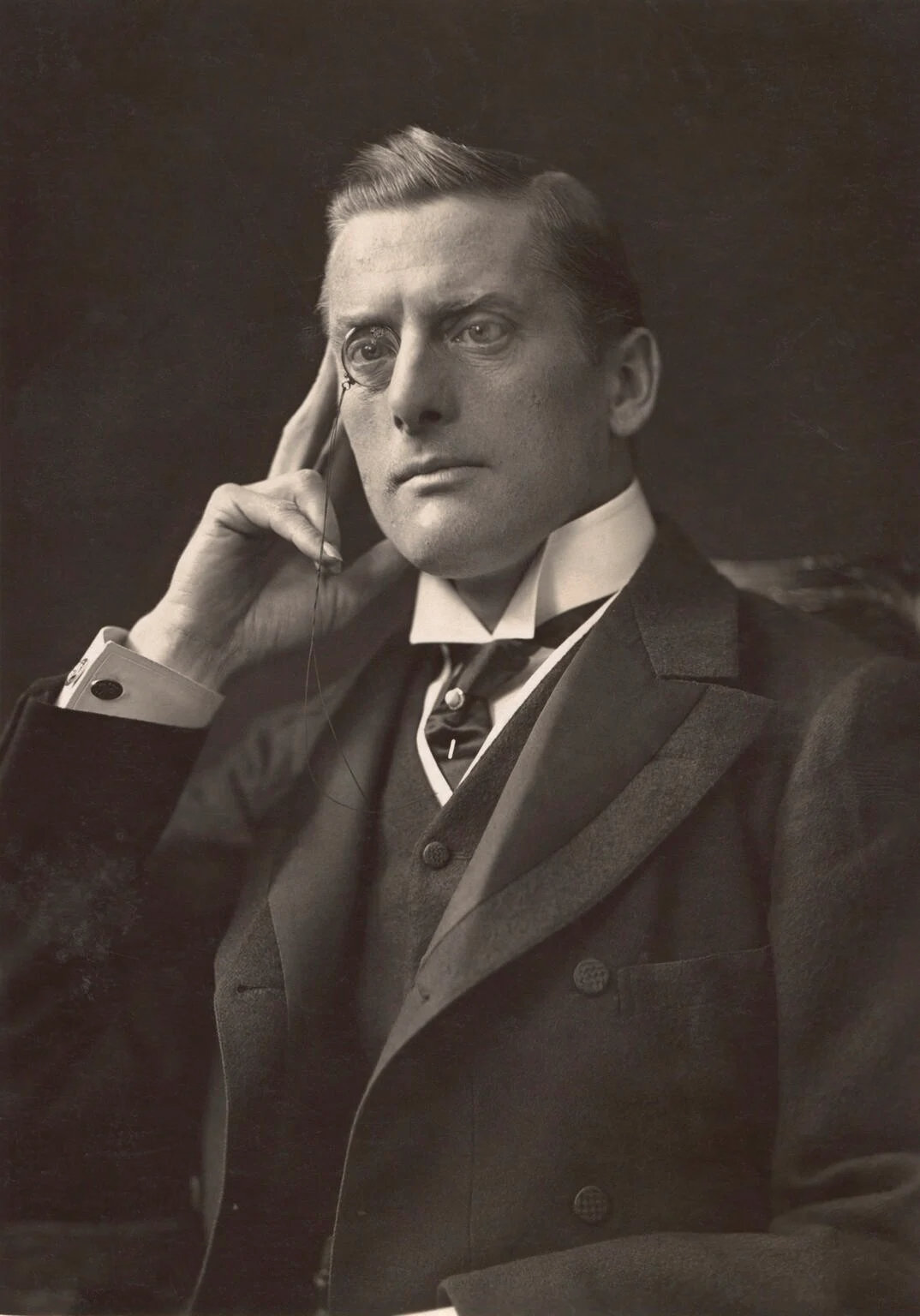
Sir Austen Chamberlain, 1908–12, by Henry Walter Barnett

In the last years before the outbreak of World War I, Chamberlain was concerned with one issue above all others: Home Rule for Ireland. The issue that had prompted his father to leave the Liberal Party in the 1880s now threatened to spill over into outright civil war, with the government of H. H. Asquith committed to the passage of a Third Home Rule Bill. Chamberlain was resolutely opposed to the dissolution of the Union with Ireland. To the strain then was added the death of his father in July 1914, only a few days after the assassination of Archduke Franz Ferdinand of Austria, which began the train of events that led to the war.

== First World War ==
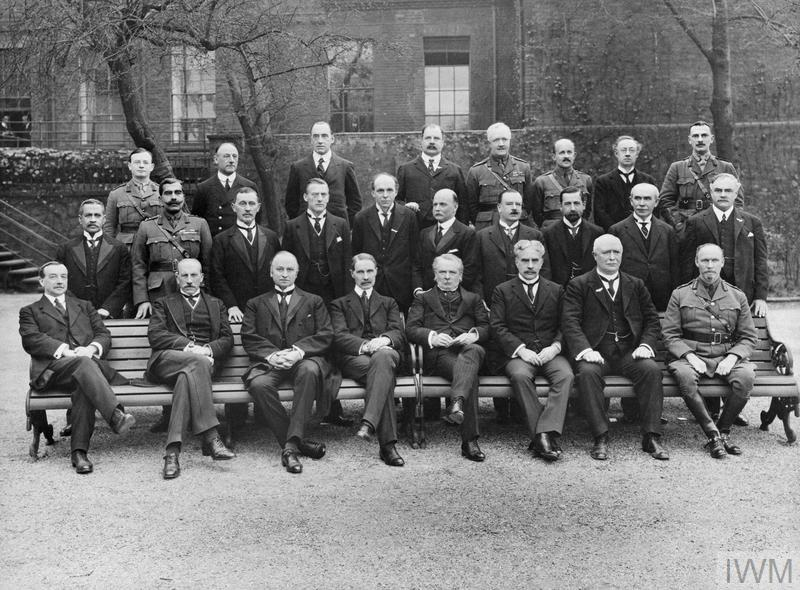
Imperial War Cabinet (1917) Austen is in the second row, fourth from the left

Pressure from the Conservative opposition, in part led by Chamberlain, eventually resulted in the formation of the wartime coalition government, in 1915. Chamberlain joined the cabinet as Secretary of State for India. Like other politicians, including Arthur Balfour and George Curzon, Chamberlain supported the invasion of Mesopotamia to increase British prestige in the region, thus discouraging a German-inspired Muslim revolt in India.

Chamberlain remained at the India Office after David Lloyd George succeeded Asquith as prime minister in late 1916, but following the Inquiry into the failure of the Mesopotamian campaign (undertaken by the separately-administered Indian Army) in 1915, including the loss of the British garrison during the Siege of Kut, Chamberlain resigned his post in July 1917; as the minister ultimately responsible, the fault lay with him. He was widely acclaimed for such a principled act.

After Lloyd George's Paris speech (12 November 1917) at which he said that "when he saw the appalling casualty lists he wish(ed) it had not been necessary to win so many ["victories"]" there was talk of Chamberlain withdrawing support from the government. Lloyd George survived by claiming that the aim of the new inter-Allied Supreme War Council was purely to "coordinate" policy, not to overrule the British generals, who still enjoyed a good deal of support from Conservatives.

Later, he returned to government and became a member of the War Cabinet in April 1918 as Minister without Portfolio, replacing Lord Milner, who had become Secretary of State for War.

Following the victory of the Lloyd George coalition in the 1918 general election, Chamberlain was again appointed to the position of Chancellor of the Exchequer in January 1919 and immediately faced the huge task of restoring Britain's finances after four years of wartime expenditure.

== Leadership ==
Citing ill health, Law retired from the leadership of the Conservative branch of the Lloyd George government in the spring of 1921. His seniority and the general dislike of Curzon, his counterpart in the House of Lords, helped Chamberlain to both succeed Law as Leader of the House of Commons and take over in the office of Lord Privy Seal. He was succeeded at the Exchequer by Sir Robert Horne; it seemed that after ten years of waiting, Austen would again be given the opportunity of succeeding to the premiership.

The Lloyd George coalition was beginning to falter, following numerous scandals and the unsuccessful conclusion of the Anglo-Irish War, and it was widely believed that it would not survive until the next general election. He had previously had little regard for Lloyd George, but the opportunity of working closely with the "Welsh Wizard" gave Chamberlain a new insight into his nominal superior in the government (by now, the Conservative Party was by far the larger partner in the government).

It was an unfortunate change of allegiance for Chamberlain, for by late 1921, the Conservative backbenchers were growing more and more restless for an end to the coalition and a return to single-party (Conservative) government. Conservatives in the House of Lords began, in public, to oppose the coalition, disregarding calls for support from Chamberlain. In the country at large, Conservative candidates began to oppose the coalition at by-elections, and discontent spread to the House of Commons.

In the autumn of 1922, Chamberlain faced a backbench revolt, largely led by Stanley Baldwin, designed to oust Lloyd George, and when he summoned the Carlton Club meeting 19 October 1922, of Conservative MPs, a motion was passed there for fighting the forthcoming election as an independent party. Chamberlain resigned the party leadership rather than act against what he believed to be his duty. He was succeeded by Law, whose views and intentions he had predicted the evening before the vote at a private meeting. Law formed a government shortly thereafter, but Chamberlain was not given a post, but it seems that he would not have accepted a position even if he had been offered one.

Austen and Neville Chamberlain, Iain Duncan Smith and Liz Truss are the only four Conservative leaders not to lead the party into a general election. Until William Hague (1997–2001), Austen had been the only Conservative overall leader in the history of the party not to become prime minister.

== Foreign Secretary ==
=== Appointment ===
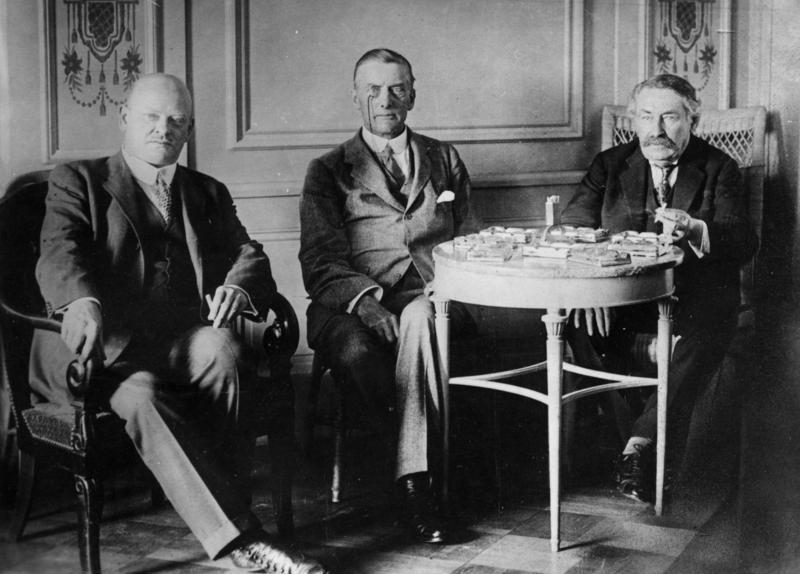
With Stresemann (left) and Briand at Locarno

After the second resignation of Law in May 1923 (Law died from throat cancer later that year), Chamberlain was passed over again for the leadership of the party in favour of Stanley Baldwin. Baldwin offered Chamberlain the post of Lord Privy Seal, but Chamberlain insisted other former ministers from the Coalition to be included as well; Baldwin refused. However, Chamberlain returned to government when Baldwin formed his second ministry following success in the election of October 1924, serving in the important office of Foreign Secretary from 1924 to 1929. Chamberlain was largely allowed a free hand by the easy-going Baldwin.

It is as Foreign Secretary that Chamberlain's place in history was finally assured. In a difficult period in international relations, Chamberlain faced not only a split in the entente cordiale by the French occupation of the Ruhr but also the controversy over the 1924 Geneva Protocol, which threatened to dilute British sovereignty over the issue of League of Nations economic sanctions.

=== Locarno Pact ===
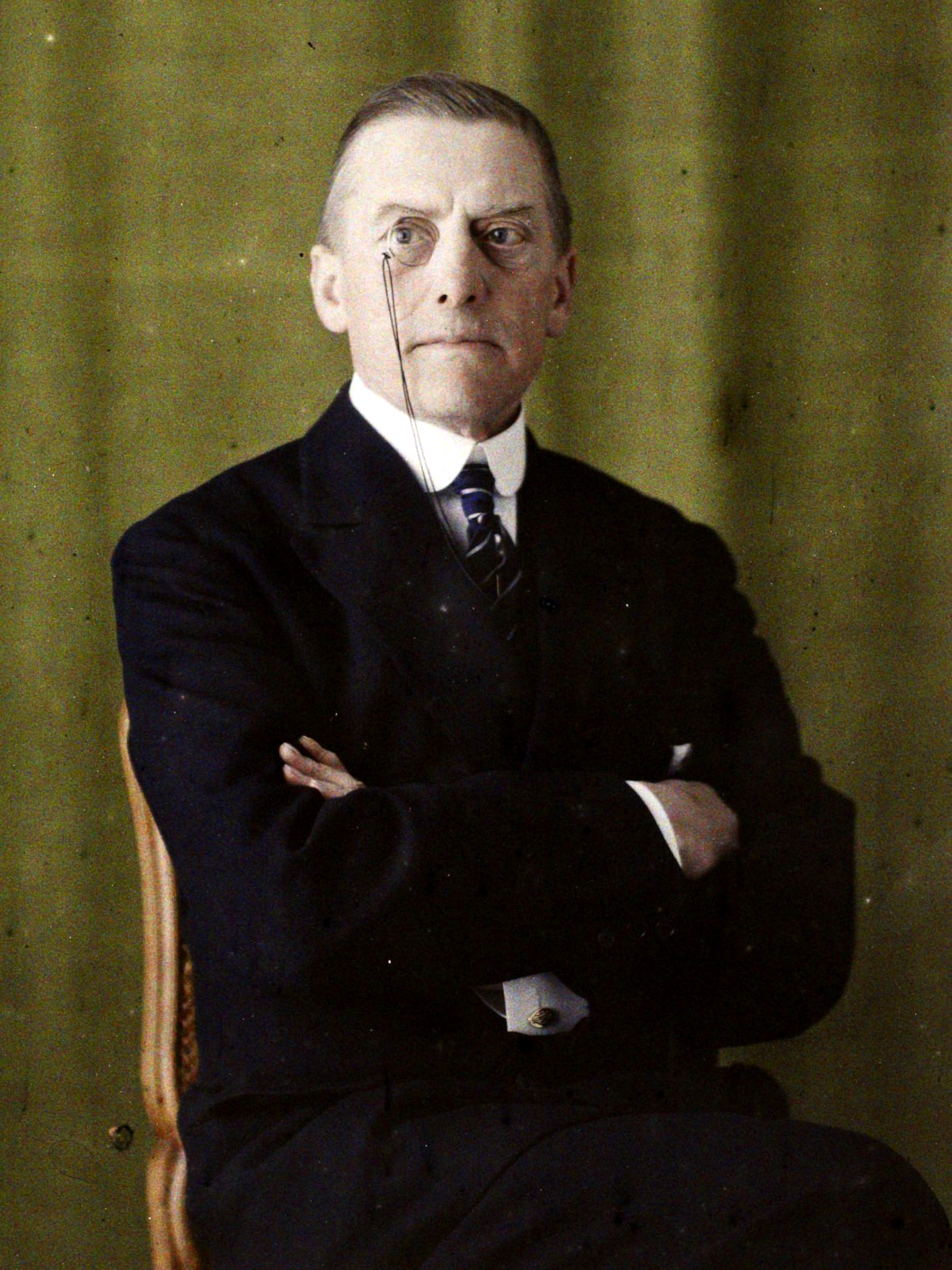
Autochrome portrait by Georges Chevalier, 1930.

Despite the importance to history of other pressing issues, his reputation chiefly rests on his part in the negotiations over what came to be known as the Locarno Pact of 1925. Seeking to maintain the postwar status quo in the West, Chamberlain responded favourably to the approaches of German Foreign Minister Gustav Stresemann for a British guarantee of Germany's western borders. Besides promoting Franco-German reconciliation, Chamberlain's main motive was to create a situation in which Germany could pursue territorial revisionism in Eastern Europe peacefully.

Chamberlain's understanding was that if Franco-German relations improved, France would gradually abandon the cordon sanitaire, the French alliance system in Eastern Europe between the wars. Once France had abandoned its allies in Eastern Europe as the price of better relations with Germany, Poland and Czechoslovakia would have no Great Power ally to protect them and would be forced to adjust to German demands. Chamberlain believed that they would peacefully hand over the territories claimed by Germany such as the Sudetenland, the Polish Corridor and the Free City of Danzig. Promoting territorial revisionism in Eastern Europe in Germany's favour was one of Chamberlain's principal reasons for Locarno.

Together with Aristide Briand of France, Chamberlain and Stresemann met at the town of Locarno in October 1925 and signed a mutual agreement (together with representatives from Belgium and Italy) to settle all differences between the nations by arbitration, not war. For his services, Chamberlain was not only awarded the Nobel Peace Prize but also made a Knight Companion of the Order of the Garter. He was the first ordinary Knight Companion of the Garter since Elizabethan times (Sir Henry Lee) to die without having been made a peer. He was the 871st Knight Companion of the Garter.

Chamberlain also secured Britain's accession to the Kellogg-Briand Pact, which theoretically outlawed war as an instrument of policy. Chamberlain also said that Italian dictator Benito Mussolini was "a man with whom business could be done".

=== Resignation ===
After his less satisfactory engagement in issues in the Far East and Egypt, Chamberlain's tenure as Foreign Secretary ended with the defeat of Baldwin's government at the election of 1929. He went into retirement.

Chamberlain briefly returned to government in 1931 as First Lord of the Admiralty in Ramsay MacDonald's first National Government but soon retired later that year after his actions in regards to the Invergordon Mutiny. Many of the officers at the time state that the mutiny at Invergordon was a direct result of the action of the Admiralty under Chamberlain's leadership who accepted the cuts in pay for the crews as a result of the Government's need to reduce expenditure. The First Sea Lord Frederick Field was ill at the time of the incident and Chamberlain had proceeded without receiving the advice of the First Sea Lord.

== Later life ==
=== Backbencher ===
Over the next six years as a senior backbencher, he gave strong support to the National Government on domestic issues but was critical on its foreign policy. In 1935, the government faced a parliamentary rebellion over the Hoare-Laval Pact; his opposition to the vote of censure is widely believed to have been instrumental in saving the government from defeat on the floor of the House.

Chamberlain was again briefly considered in 1935 for the post of Foreign Secretary but was passed over once the Abyssinia Crisis was over for being too old for the job. Instead, his advice was sought as to the suitability of his former Parliamentary Private Secretary, now Minister for the League of Nations, Anthony Eden for the post.

=== Calls for rearmament ===
From 1934 to 1937, Chamberlain was, with Winston Churchill, Roger Keyes and Leo Amery, the most prominent voice calling for British rearmament in the face of a growing threat from Nazi Germany.

However, in 1935, Stanley Baldwin's government produced a White Paper and announced modest rearmament. Although Baldwin would forever be condemned for his failure to rearm sufficiently, the Labour Party opposed the White Paper. Clement Attlee said:

We believe in a League system in which the whole world would be ranged against an aggressor. If it is shown that someone is proposing to break the peace, let us bring the whole world opinion against her.

Afterwards Austen Chamberlain fully supported Baldwin and severely criticised Attlee's speech with the words:

If war breaks out, and we become involved in a struggle and if the Honourable Member for Limehouse [Clement Attlee] is sitting on the government benches while London is being bombed, do you think he will hold the language he held today? If he does he will be one of the first victims of the war, for he will be strung up by an angry and justifiably angry populace to the nearest lamp post.

In addition to speaking eloquently in Parliament on the matter, he was the chairman of two Conservative parliamentary delegations in late 1936 that met with Prime Minister Stanley Baldwin to remonstrate with him about his government's delay in rearming the British defence forces. More respected than Churchill, Chamberlain became something of an icon to young Conservatives, as the last survivor of Victorian high politics.

=== Death ===
Though he never again served in a government, he survived in good health until March 1937, dying just ten weeks before his younger half-brother, Neville, became the first and only member of the Chamberlain dynasty to become prime minister.

Chamberlain died at the age of 73 in his London home, 24 Egerton Terrace, on 16 March 1937. He is buried in East Finchley Cemetery in London.

At his death, his estate was valued for probate at £45,044 18/1. This was a relatively modest sum for such a famous public figure. Much of his father's fortune had been lost in a failed attempt by his younger brother Neville to grow sisal in the West Indies in the early 1890s, and unlike Neville, he never went into business to make money for himself.

His personal and political papers are housed in the Cadbury Research Library at the University of Birmingham.

== Assessments ==
Robert Blake wrote that Austen Chamberlain "for all his talents was only a thin echo of his formidable father, a mere shadow of that extraordinary figure ... Austen Chamberlain was altogether kinder than his father, more likeable, more honourable, more high-minded and less effective ... he lacked that ultimate hardness without which men seldom reach supreme political power". Blake comments that he often missed his chances because he could be persuaded to back off by the suggestion that he was acting for self-seeking reasons, hence Churchill's quip that "he always played the game, and he always lost it".

David Dutton comments that early assessments of Chamberlain's career compared him unfavourably with his father, who overshadowed his early career, and his brother, who overshadowed his later decades. In his forties, when he was ready to carve out his own identity, he had to act as a surrogate for his disabled father, whom he resembled in appearance (although he was softer and less wiry, both in face and body) and dress (wearing a monocle, and an orchid in his lapel). Until William Hague (1997–2001), he was the only Conservative leader of the twentieth century not to become prime minister. Although this is sometimes attributed to character defects, Dutton argues that he was a major figure in his own right, who only narrowly missed becoming prime minister in 1922 or 1923. Dutton quotes with approval Leo Amery's verdict written just after Chamberlain's death: 'He just missed greatness and the highest position, but his was a fine life of honourable public service'.

Chamberlain could speak effectively, but was never a stirring orator. For most of his career he was renowned for rectitude and civic duty. Before the war Chamberlain had been a somewhat reluctant radical, but after 1918 he became more conservative, concerned at the new threat of socialism, and whose dress – he not only wore a monocle and frock coat but was one of the last MPs to wear a top hat inside the Commons Chamber – made him appear a relic from a previous generation. Dutton suggests that his "exaggerated sense of his own importance and dignity which compounded an already stiff and unbending personal demeanour", came from having to serve under men – Law and Baldwin – whom he regarded as his juniors.

== Personal life ==
In 1906, Chamberlain married Ivy Muriel Dundas (died 1941), daughter of Colonel Henry Dundas. She was created a Dame Grand Cross of the Order of the British Empire (GBE) in 1925. The couple had two sons, Joseph and Lawrence, and a daughter, Diane.

During the 1920s, the Chamberlains lived at a house called Twytt's Ghyll in Fir Toll Road, Mayfield, East Sussex. The house was sold in 1929. R.C.G. Foster said, "He kept himself quite aloof from the village and was not popular with his neighbours". He had an interest in rock gardening.

== Archives ==
A collection of archival material related to Austen Chamberlain can be found at the Cadbury Research Library, University of Birmingham. A separate collection of letters relating to Austen Chamberlain can also be found there.

== See also ==
- List of covers of Time magazine (1920s) (30 November 1925)

== Sources and further reading ==
- Alexander, M.S.; Philpott, W.J. (1998). "The Entente Cordiale and the Next War: Anglo-French Views on Future Military Cooperation, 1928 –1939". Intelligence and National Security. 13 (1): 53–84. doi:10.1080/02684529808432463.
- Blake, Robert (1955). The Unknown Prime Minister: The Life and Times of Andrew Bonar Law, 1858–1923. London: Eyre and Spottiswoode.
- Dutton, David (1985). Austen Chamberlain: Gentleman in Politics. Bolton: R.Anderson.
- Dutton, D. J. (January 2011) [2004]. "Chamberlain, Sir (Joseph) Austen (1863–1937)". Oxford Dictionary of National Biography (online ed.). Oxford University Press. doi:10.1093/ref:odnb/32351. (Subscription, Wikipedia Library access or UK public library membership required.)
- Dutton, David. "Sir Austen Chamberlain and British Foreign Policy 1931–37." Diplomacy and Statecraft 16.2 (2005): 281–295.
- Edwards, Peter. "The Austen Chamberlain-Mussolini Meetings." The Historical Journal 14.1 (1971): 153–164.
- Grayson, Richard. "Austen Chamberlain and the Commitment to Europe: British Foreign Policy, 1924–1929" Diplomacy & Statecraft 17#4 (2006) https://doi.org/10.1080/09592290600943304
- Johnson, Gaynor (March 2011). "Sir Austen Chamberlain, the Marquess of Crewe and Anglo-French Relations, 1924–1928". Contemporary British History. 25 (25#1): 49 –64. doi:10.1080/13619462.2011.546100. S2CID 144595507. – argues that Crewe gave Chamberlain key ideas about French security and disarmament policy, the implementation of the Geneva Protocol, the Treaty of Locarno, and the Kellogg-Briand Pact.
- Johnson, Gaynor (2006). "Austen Chamberlain and Britain's Relations with France, 1924–1929" (PDF). Diplomacy & Statecraft. 17 (17#4): 753–769. doi:10.1080/09592290600943304. S2CID 153721391.
- Locker-Lampson, Oliver Stillingfleet (1922). "Chamberlain, Joseph Austen" . In Chisholm, Hugh (ed.). Encyclopædia Britannica (12th ed.). London & New York: The Encyclopædia Britannica Company.
- McKercher, B. J. C. "Austen Chamberlain and the continental balance of power: Strategy, stability, and the league of nations, 1924–29." Diplomacy and Statecraft 14.2 (2003): 207–236.
- McKercher, Brian J. C. "A Sane and Sensible Diplomacy: Austen Chamberlain, Japan, and The Naval Balance of Power in the Pacific Ocean, 1924–29." Canadian Journal of History 21.2 (1986): 187–214.
- Petrie, Sir Charles (1938). The Chamberlain Tradition. London: Lovat Dickson Limited.
- Tomes, Jason H. "Austen Chamberlain and the Kellogg Pact." Millennium 18.1 (1989): 1–27.
- Turner, Arthur. "Austen Chamberlain, The Times and the Question of Revision of the Treaty of Versailles in 1933." European History Quarterly 18.1 (1988): 51–70.
- Zametica, Jovan. "Sir Austen Chamberlain and the Italo-Yugoslav crisis over Albania February–May 1927." Balcanica 36 (2005): 203–235. online

=== Primary sources ===
- Petrie, Sir Charles (1939–1940). The Life and Letters of the Right Hon. Sir Austen Chamberlain. London: Cassell & Co. 2 vols.
- Self, Robert C., ed. (1995). The Austen Chamberlain Diary Letters: The Correspondence of Sir Austen Chamberlain with his Sisters Hilda and Ida, 1916–1937. London; New York: Cambridge University Press. ISBN 978-0-521-55160-1.

Parliament of the United Kingdom
| Preceded by George Hastings | Member of Parliament for East Worcestershire; 1892–1914 | Succeeded by Frederick Leverton Harris |
| Preceded by Joseph Chamberlain | Member of Parliament for Birmingham West; 1914–1937 | Succeeded by Walter Higgs |
Political offices
| Preceded by Edmund Robertson | Civil Lord of the Admiralty; 1895–1900 | Succeeded by E. G. Pretyman |
| Preceded by Robert William Hanbury | Financial Secretary to the Treasury; 1900–1902 | Succeeded by William Hayes Fisher |
| Preceded by Charles Vane-Tempest-Stewart, 6th Marquess of Londonderry | Postmaster General; 1902–1903 | Succeeded by Lord Stanley |
| Preceded by Charles Ritchie | Chancellor of the Exchequer; 1903–1905 | Succeeded by H. H. Asquith |
| Preceded by Earl of Crewe | Secretary of State for India; 1915–1917 | Succeeded by Edwin Montagu |
| Preceded by Bonar Law | Chancellor of the Exchequer; 1919–1921 | Succeeded by Sir Robert Horne |
| Preceded by Bonar Law | Lord Privy Seal; 1921–1922 | Succeeded by Lord Robert Cecil |
| Preceded by Bonar Law | Conservative Leader of the Commons; 1921–1922 | Succeeded by Bonar Law (as overall leader) |
| Preceded by Ramsay MacDonald | Foreign Secretary; 1924–1929 | Succeeded by Arthur Henderson |
| Preceded by A. V. Alexander | First Lord of the Admiralty; 1931 | Succeeded by Bolton Eyres-Monsell, 1st Viscount Monsell |
Academic offices
| Preceded by F. E. Smith, 1st Earl of Birkenhead | Rector of the University of Glasgow; 1925–1928 | Succeeded by Stanley Baldwin |
| Preceded by James Herbert Benyon | Chancellor of the University of Reading; 1935–1937 | Succeeded by Sir Samuel Hoare, Bt |
