= Kings Heath Park =

Park in the Kings Heath district of Birmingham, England

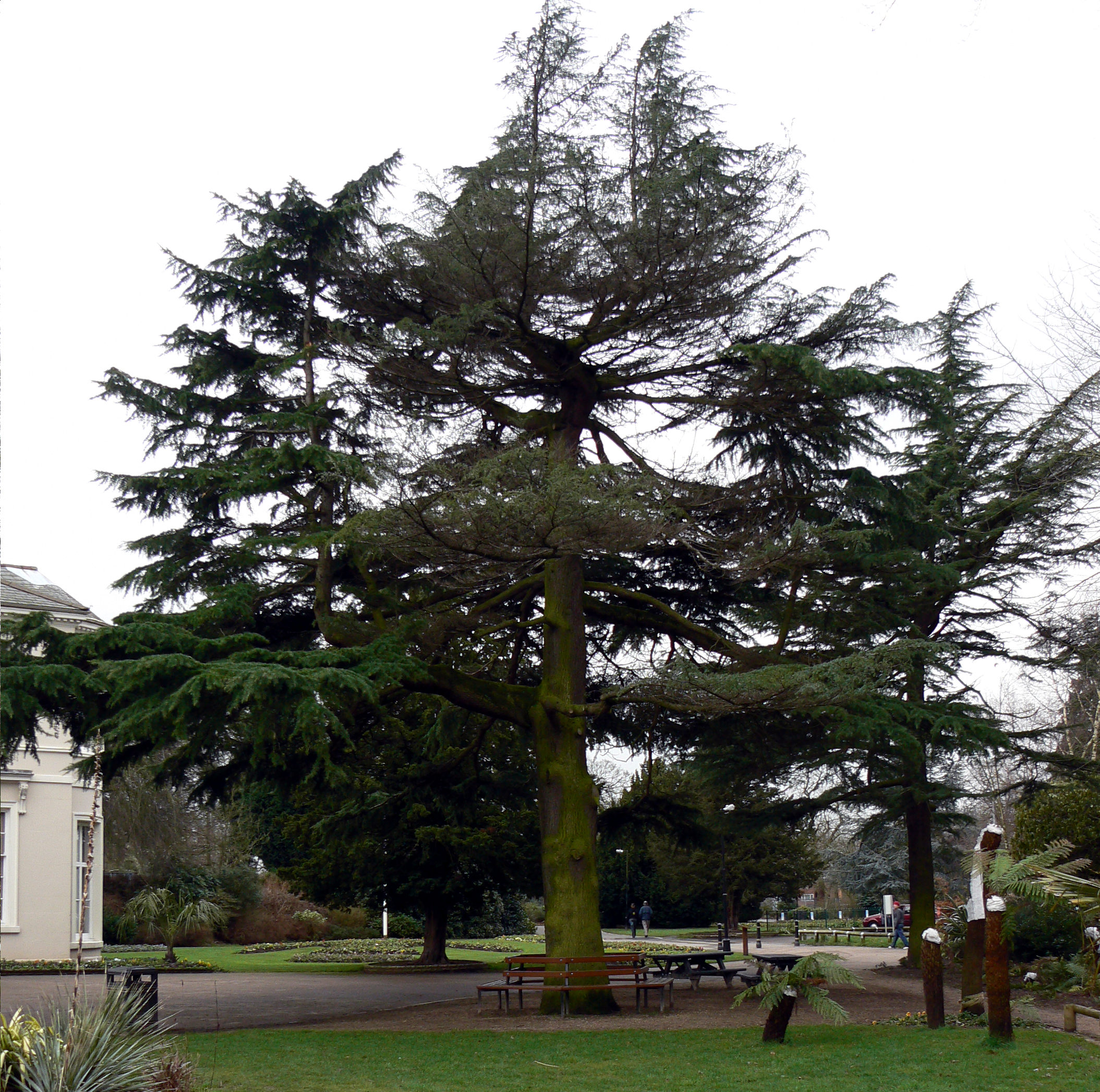
- A tree next to the house (left)
- Interactive map of Kings Heath Park
- Type: Park
- Location: Birmingham, England
- Coordinates: 52.4326°N 1.9018°W
- Created: 1908
- Operator: Birmingham City Council
- Website: birmingham.gov.uk/kingsheathpark

Kings Heath Park is a Green Flag status park in the Kings Heath district of Birmingham, England, which is managed by Birmingham City Council.

For a time, the park was used as the setting for the popular ATV programme Gardening Today.

== History ==
The park is centred on a house, built in 1832 for the newly elected MP William Congreve Russell. In 1880 the house was bought by John Cartland, a wealthy industrialist and ancestor of the author Barbara Cartland. In 1902 the Cartland family formed the Priory Trust Co Ltd to own and manage the house and land with the intention of developing the area for housing. These plans came to nothing, and on 9 November 1908 the Trust sold the house and half the surrounding land to the Kings Norton and Northfield Urban District Council. The council immediately opened the grounds as a public park.

From 1909-1911 the house was used as a school. In 1911, Kings Heath — and the park — was incorporated into the city of Birmingham. The Trust sold the remaining land to Birmingham Corporation on 10 February 1914, and this was immediately incorporated into the park.

In 1953, the city council created a School of Horticultural Training in the house, using part of the park as training gardens. Since 1995, this has been run, under a partnership arrangement, by Pershore (later Warwickshire) College and Bournville College.

In 2008/9, Kings Heath Park was granted a Green Flag Award for the 7th year running.
