= Walter Higgs =

British politician (1886–1961)

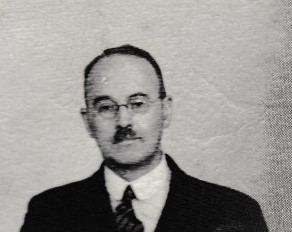
Higgs

Walter Frank Higgs (7 April 1886 – 8 August 1961) was a Conservative Party politician in England.

He was elected as member of parliament (MP) for Birmingham West at a by-election in 1937 following the death of the Conservative MP Sir Austen Chamberlain. At the 1945 general election, he was defeated by the Labour Party candidate, Charles Simmons. In addition he took a keen interest in both local and national politics, serving on Birmingham City Council from 1934 and 1937.

Walter Frank Higgs was born at Kidderminster, Worcestershire, on 7 April 1886. He was educated at Birmingham Technical School, and then went into the electrical industry, gaining experience with the General Electric Company, the British Thomson-Houston Company, the Electric Construction Company, and others.

In 1912, Walter Higgs and his brother founded a small company in Witton, Birmingham to manufacture electric motors. This concern he built up from employing seven workers in 1912 to over 1,500 in 1962 when the firm moved to Yate, Bristol as part of Newman Industries. He was a member of the Institution of Electrical Engineers and a life governor of Birmingham University.

Parliament of the United Kingdom
Preceded by Sir Austen Chamberlain	Member of Parliament for Birmingham West; 1937–1945	Succeeded by Charles Simmons
