= George Rushout, 3rd Baron Northwick =

British Conservative politician

The Right Honourable The Lord Northwick
- Born: 30 August 1811; Burford, Shropshire
- Died: 11 November 1887 (aged 76); Upper Norwood
- Education: Harrow School
- Alma mater: Christ Church, Oxford
- Children: 1
- Parent(s): George Rushout-Bowles & Lady Caroline

George Rushout, 3rd Baron Northwick (30 August 1811 – 11 November 1887), was a British Conservative politician.

== Early life and education ==
Northwick was the son of George Rushout-Bowles, younger son of John Rushout, 1st Baron Northwick. His mother was Lady Caroline, daughter of John Stewart, 7th Earl of Galloway. He was born at Burford, Shropshire where his father was then parish Rector.

He was educated at Harrow School. In 1829 he entered Christ Church, Oxford, graduating as BA in 1833 and MA in 1836.

== Political career ==
Rushout was returned to Parliament for Evesham in 1837. In May 1838 he fought a duel with Peter Borthwick, who had been elected alongside Northwick in 1837 but had been unseated on petition in March 1838, over the election results. He continued to represent Evesham until 1841, and later sat as Member of Parliament for Worcestershire East between 1847 and 1859. The latter year he succeeded his uncle in the barony and to Northwick Park, Gloucestershire and entered the House of Lords.

== Military career and other interests ==
Rushout was commissioned as a cornet in the 1st Life Guards in 1833, was promoted to lieutenant in 1837 and major in 1842, before retiring from the army in the latter year. In 1853 he was appointed lieutenant-colonel of the disembodied Herefordshire Militia and became lt-col commandant after its embodiment during the Crimean War, a position he held until his resignation in 1862.

Lord Northwick was in later life governor of Harrow School and Cheltenham College.

== Family ==
Lord Northwick married Elizabeth Augusta, daughter of William Bateman-Hanbury, 1st Baron Bateman and widow of George Drought Warburton, in 1869. There were no surviving children from the marriage, an only child, a daughter Caroline, dying aged eight in 1878. On 23 January 1886 the couple, then married sixteen years, were awarded the prize of the Dunmow Flitch, "receiving it privately and without the customary forms".

Lord Northwick died at the Queen's Hotel, Upper Norwood, Surrey in November 1887, aged 76, when his titles became extinct. Lady Northwick died in May 1912, aged 80.

== See also ==
- Politics of the United Kingdom

Parliament of the United Kingdom
Preceded by Sir Charles Cockerell, Bt; Peter Borthwick	Member of Parliament for Evesham; 1837–1841; With: Peter Borthwick 1837–1838; Lord Marcus Hill 1838–1841	Succeeded by Lord Marcus Hill; Peter Borthwick
Preceded by John Barneby; James Arthur Taylor	Member of Parliament for Worcestershire East; 1847–1859; With: James Arthur Taylor 1847; John Hodgetts-Foley 1847–1859	Succeeded by John Hodgetts-Foley; Frederick Gough-Calthorpe
Peerage of Great Britain
Preceded by John Rushout	Baron Northwick; 1859–1887	Extinct
