= Frederick Gough-Calthorpe, 5th Baron Calthorpe =

British Liberal politician (1826–1893)

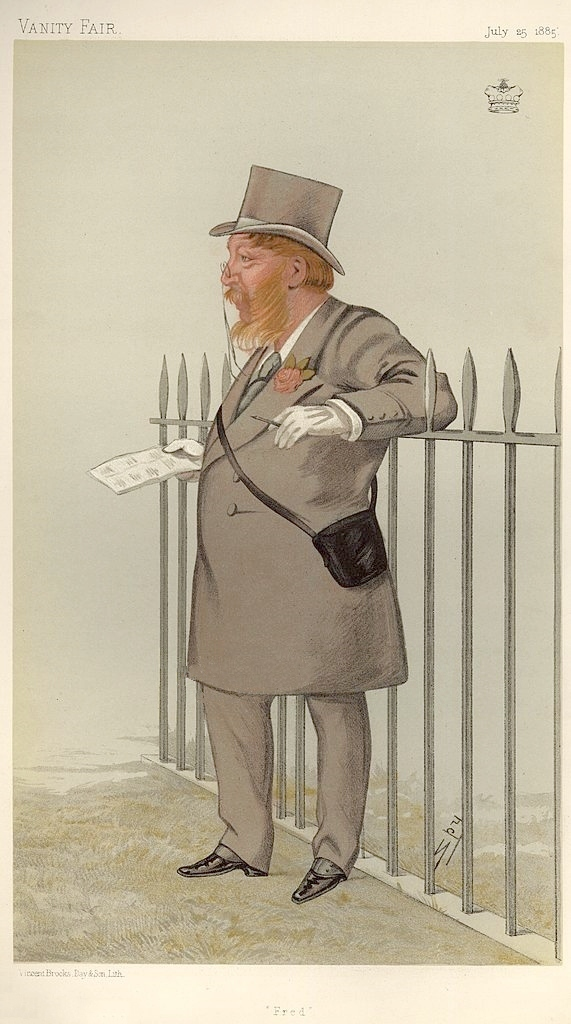
Caricature by Spy published in Vanity Fair in 1885.

Frederick Henry William Gough-Calthorpe, 5th Baron Calthorpe (24 July 1826 – 25 June 1893), was a British Liberal Party politician.

== Background and education ==
Born in London, Calthorpe was the eldest son of Frederick Gough, 4th Baron Calthorpe, and Lady Charlotte Sophia Somerset, daughter of Henry Somerset, 6th Duke of Beaufort. He was educated at Eton and Trinity College, Cambridge.

== Political career ==
Calthorpe was elected to the House of Commons as one of the two Members of Parliament (MPs) for Worcestershire East at a by-election in February 1859. He was re-elected at the general election later in 1859 and again in 1865, and held the seat until May 1868, when he succeeded his father in the barony and took his seat in the House of Lords.

== Personal life ==
Lord Calthorpe, a member of the Gough-Calthorpe family, died at Grosvenor Square, London, in June 1893, aged 66. He never married and was succeeded in the barony by his younger brother, Augustus Gough-Calthorpe, 6th Baron Calthorpe.

== Arms ==
Coat of arms of Frederick Gough-Calthorpe, 5th Baron Calthorpe
| Crest 1st: A Boar's Head couped at the neck Azure (Calthorpe); 2nd: A Boar's Head couped Argent pierced through the cheek with a Broken Spear Gules (Gough) Escutcheon Quarterly: 1st and 4th, Checky Or and Azure a Fess Ermine (Calthorpe); 2nd and 3rd, Gules on a Fess Argent between three Boars' Heads couped Or a Lion passant Azure (Gough) Supporters On either side a Wild Man proper his Hair and Beard Sable wreathed about the head and waist with Oak Vert fructed Or the exterior hand holding a Club erect of the last Motto Gradu Diverso Via Una (The same way by different steps) |

Parliament of the United Kingdom
| Preceded by George Bowes-Rushout; John Hodgetts-Foley | Member of Parliament for Worcestershire East; 1859–1868; With: John Hodgetts-Foley 1859–1861; Harry Vernon 1861–1868 | Succeeded by Harry Vernon; Hon. Charles Lyttelton |
Peerage of Great Britain
| Preceded by Frederick Gough | Baron Calthorpe; 1868–1893 | Succeeded by Augustus Gough-Calthorpe |
