= Charles Lyttelton, 8th Viscount Cobham =

British peer and politician (1842–1922)

The Right Honourable The Viscount Cobham
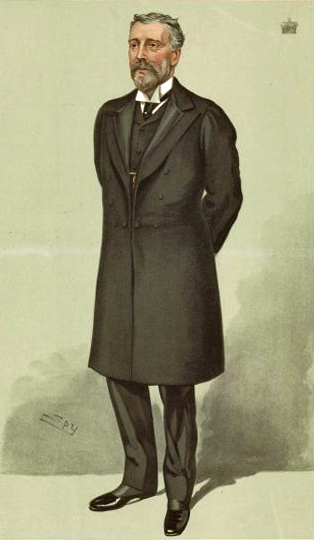
- "Cricket, Railways & Agriculture"; Viscount Cobham as caricatured by Spy (Leslie Ward) in Vanity Fair, May 1904

Member of Parliament for East Worcestershire
- In office 1868–1874

Personal details
- Born: 27 October 1842
- Died: 9 June 1922 (aged 79)
- Party: Liberal Party
- Spouse: Mary Cavendish (m. 1878)
- Children: 3+, including John, George and Charles
- Parent: George Lyttleton (father)
- Relatives: Lyttelton family Lucy Cavendish (sister); Neville Lyttelton (brother); George Lyttleton (brother); Lavinia Talbot (sister); Arthur Lyttelton (brother); Robert Lyttelton (brother); Edward Lyttelton (brother); Alfred Lyttelton (brother); Humphrey Lyttelton (grandson); Charles Lyttleton (grandson)
- Education: Trinity College, Cambridge

Charles George Lyttelton, 8th Viscount Cobham (27 October 1842 – 9 June 1922), known as The Lord Lyttelton from 1876 to 1889, was a British peer and politician from the Lyttelton family. He was a Liberal Member of Parliament.

== Biography ==
Cobham was the eldest son of George William Lyttelton, 4th Baron Lyttelton, and Mary Glynne. Alfred Lyttelton was his younger brother. He was educated at Eton and Trinity College, Cambridge.

He was elected to the House of Commons for East Worcestershire in 1868, a seat he held until 1874. Apart from his parliamentary career he also served as high sheriff of Bewdley, Worcestershire. Cobham succeeded his father as fifth Baron Lyttelton in 1876. In 1889 he also succeeded his distant relative Richard Temple-Nugent-Brydges-Chandos-Grenville, 3rd Duke of Buckingham and Chandos, as eighth Baron and Viscount Cobham.

Cobham married the Hon. Mary Susan Caroline Cavendish, daughter of William George Cavendish, 2nd Baron Chesham, in 1878. He died at Hagley Hall on 9 June 1922, aged 79, and was succeeded in his titles by his eldest son John. His second son George William Lyttelton became a classics master at Eton and was the father of the jazz trumpeter Humphrey Lyttelton. Lady Cobham died on 28 January 1937, aged 83.

He came from a cricketing family, his father (GW Lyttelton), five brothers (GWS Lyttelton, AT Lyttelton, RH Lyttelton, E Lyttelton, Hon. A Lyttelton), his sons (JC Lyttelton, CF Lyttelton) and his grandson (CJ Lyttelton) all playing, and in the case of the Hon. A Lyttelton Test cricket. He himself played 35 matches between 1861 and 1867, mainly for Cambridge University. A right-handed batsman and wicketkeeper, he scored 1439 runs at an average of 27.15, including 2 centuries. Cobham was President of Marylebone Cricket Club in 1886.

Cobham was a member of the Tennis Committee of the Marylebone Cricket Club which was responsible for framing standardized rules for the new sport of lawn tennis. These unified Laws of Lawn Tennis were published on 29 May 1875.

From 2 March 1898, Cobham held the post of 'Honorary Colonel' of the 1st Volunteer, later 7th Battalion, Worcestershire Regiment.

== Notes ==
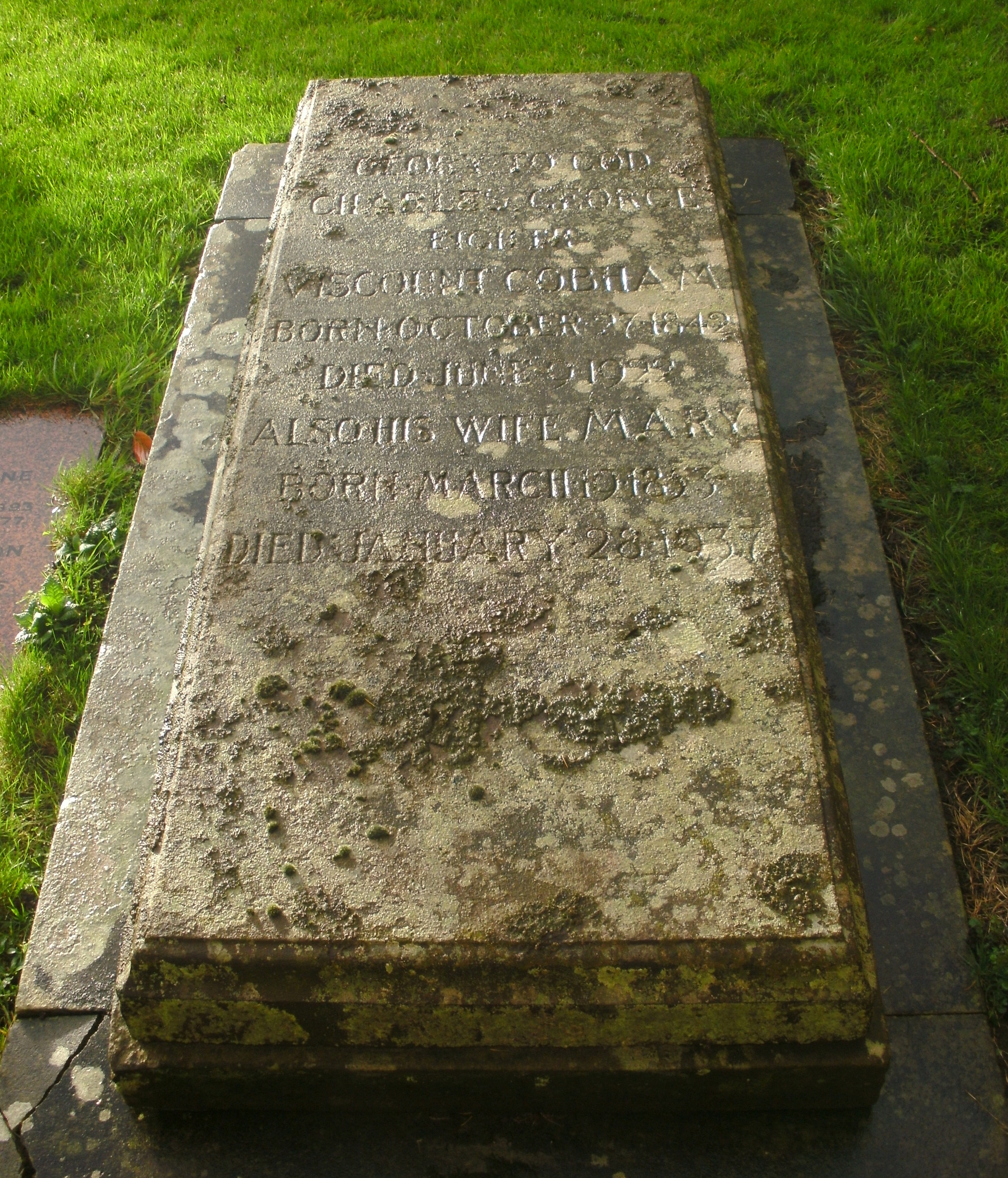
St John the Baptist Church, Hagley, grave of Charles Lyttelton, 5th Baron Lyttelton and 8th Viscount Cobham.

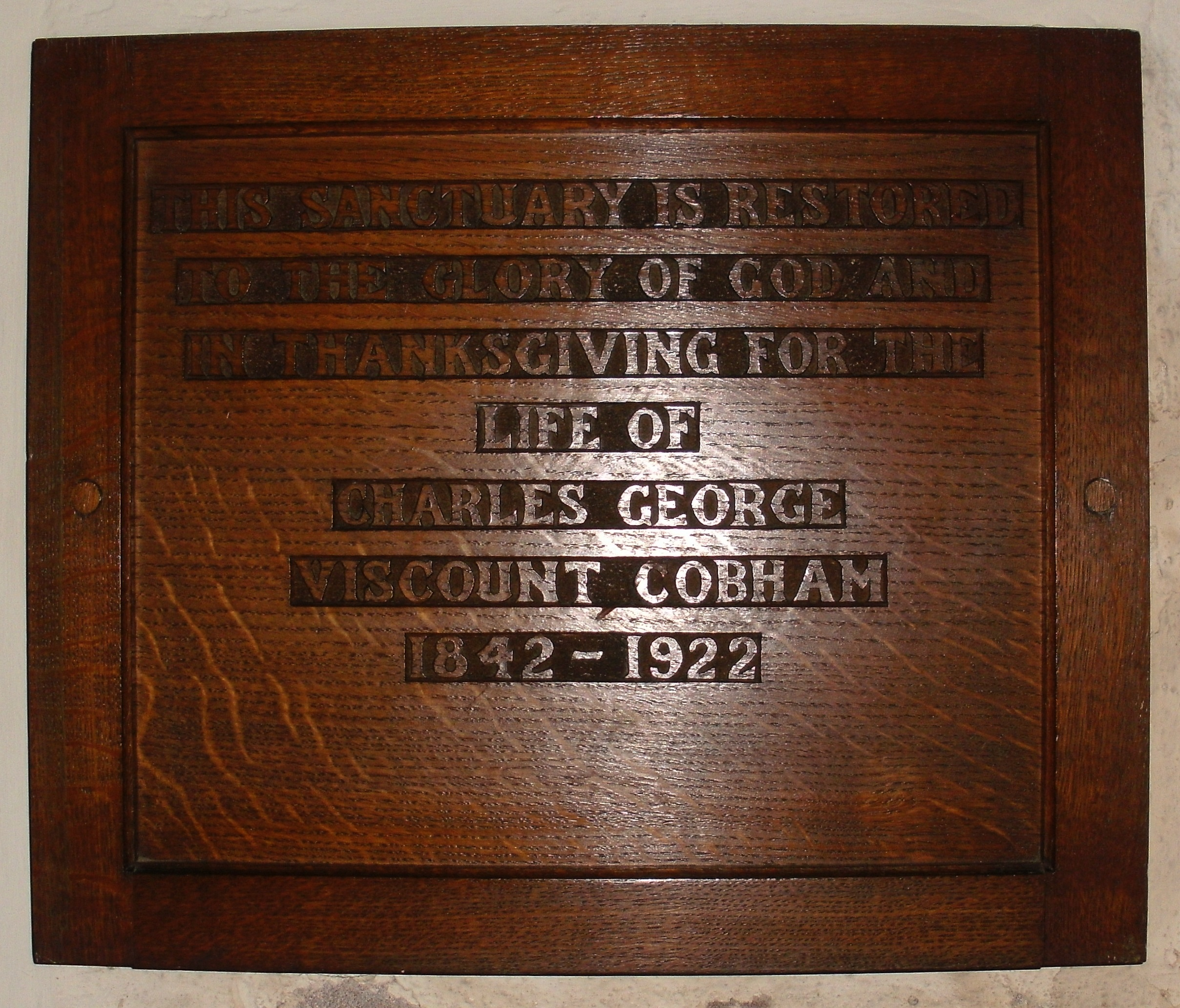
St John the Baptist Church, Hagley, wooden memorial tablet to the 8th Viscount Cobham

Parliament of the United Kingdom
Preceded by Frederick Gough-Calthorpe; Harry Foley Vernon	Member of Parliament for East Worcestershire; 1868–1874; With: Harry Foley Vernon 1868; Richard Paul Amphlett 1868–1874	Succeeded by Henry Allsopp; Thomas Eades Walker
Peerage of Great Britain
Preceded by Richard Temple-Nugent-Brydges-Chandos-Grenville	Viscount Cobham; 1889–1922	Succeeded by John Lyttelton
Preceded by George Lyttelton	Baron Lyttelton; 1876–1922	Succeeded by John Lyttelton
Peerage of Ireland
Preceded by George Lyttelton	Baron Westcote; 1876–1922	Succeeded by John Lyttelton
