= Thomas Cookes (MP) =

British politician (1804–1900)

Thomas Henry Cookes (25 October 1804 – 29 September 1900) was a British Member of Parliament.

Cookes lived at Bentley Hall in Worcestershire, and was a captain in the county yeomanry. He was also a magistrate and a deputy lieutenant of the county. He stood for the Whigs in East Worcestershire at the 1832 UK general election, winning the seat. He held the seat in 1835, and stood down at the 1837 UK general election.

Parliament of the United Kingdom
New constituency	Member of Parliament for East Worcestershire; 1832–1837; With: William Congreve Russell; Edward Holland	after = Horace St Paul	after2 = John Barneby
