= Birmingham West =

Parliamentary constituency in the United Kingdom, 1885–1950

- Former borough constituency for the House of Commons

1885–1950
- Seats: One
- Created from: Birmingham
- Replaced by: Birmingham Aston and Birmingham Ladywood

Birmingham West was a parliamentary constituency represented in the House of Commons of the Parliament of the United Kingdom. It returned one Member of Parliament (MP), elected by the first-past-the-post voting system.

It was created upon the abolition of the 3-seat Birmingham constituency in 1885 and abolished in 1950.

== Boundaries ==
Before 1885 the city of Birmingham had been a three-member constituency (see Birmingham (UK Parliament constituency) for further details). Under the Redistribution of Seats Act 1885 the parliamentary borough of Birmingham was split into seven single-member divisions, one of which was Birmingham West. It consisted of All Saints' and St Paul's wards and part of Rotton Park ward.

In the 1918 redistribution of parliamentary seats, the Representation of the People Act 1918 provided for twelve Birmingham divisions - one of which was designated as the Birmingham West constituency. In 1945 one of the other Birmingham seats was split in two, as it had over 100,000 electors, but that change did not affect the other divisions. The Birmingham West constituency in 1918 consisted of the County Borough of Birmingham ward of St Paul's and parts of All Saints' and Lozells wards.

In the redistribution which took effect in the 1950 United Kingdom general election, the Representation of the People Act 1948 redivided Birmingham into thirteen constituencies. The West division was abolished. St Paul's and Lozells wards became part of Birmingham Aston. All Saints' ward became part of Birmingham Ladywood.

== Members of Parliament ==
Election	Member	Party
1885	Joseph Chamberlain	Liberal
1886	Joseph Chamberlain	Liberal Unionist
1912	Joseph Chamberlain	Conservative
1914 by-election	Sir Austen Chamberlain	Conservative
1918	Sir Austen Chamberlain	Coalition Conservative
1922	Sir Austen Chamberlain	Conservative
1937 by-election	Walter Higgs	Conservative
1945	Charles Simmons	Labour
1950	Constituency abolished	

== Election results ==
=== Elections in the 1880s ===
General election 1885: Birmingham, West
Party	Candidate	Votes	%	±%
Liberal	Joseph Chamberlain	5,419	67.1	
Conservative	John Dumphreys	2,655	32.9	
Majority		2,764	34.2	
Turnout		8,074	78.2	
Registered electors		10,329		
Liberal win (new seat)				

Chamberlain was appointed President of the Local Government Board, requiring a by-election.

Birmingham, West: by-election, 9 February 1886
Party	Candidate	Votes	%	±%
Liberal	Joseph Chamberlain	Unopposed		
Liberal hold				

General election 1886: Birmingham, West
Party	Candidate	Votes	%	±%
Liberal Unionist	Joseph Chamberlain	Unopposed		
Registered electors		10,329		
Liberal Unionist gain from Liberal				

=== Elections in the 1890s ===
General election 1892: Birmingham, West
Party	Candidate	Votes	%	±%
Liberal Unionist	Joseph Chamberlain	6,297	76.7	N/A
Liberal	Corrie Grant	1,879	22.9	New
Independent Labour	J.W. Mahony	31	0.4	New
Majority		4,418	53.8	N/A
Turnout		8,207	71.0	N/A
Registered electors		11,554		
Liberal Unionist hold		Swing	N/A	

Birmingham, West: by-election, 1 July 1895
Party	Candidate	Votes	%	±%
Liberal Unionist	Joseph Chamberlain	Unopposed		
Liberal Unionist hold				

General election 1895: Birmingham, West
Party	Candidate	Votes	%	±%
Liberal Unionist	Joseph Chamberlain	5,537	81.5	+4.8
Liberal	Bernard O'Connor	1,259	18.5	−4.4
Majority		4,278	63.0	+9.2
Turnout		6,796	58.3	−12.7
Registered electors		11,647		
Liberal Unionist hold		Swing	+4.6	

=== Elections in the 1900s ===
General election 1900: Birmingham, West
Party	Candidate	Votes	%	±%
Liberal Unionist	Joseph Chamberlain	Unopposed		
Registered electors		13,035		
Liberal Unionist hold				

RL Outhwaite

General election 1906: Birmingham, West Electorate
Party	Candidate	Votes	%	±%
Liberal Unionist	Joseph Chamberlain	7,173	77.4	N/A
Liberal	R. L. Outhwaite	2,094	22.6	New
Majority		5,079	54.8	N/A
Turnout		9,267	74.2	N/A
Registered electors		12,483		
Liberal Unionist hold		Swing	N/A	

=== Elections in the 1910s ===
General election January 1910: Birmingham, West
Party	Candidate	Votes	%	±%
Liberal Unionist	Joseph Chamberlain	Unopposed		
Liberal Unionist hold				

General election December 1910: Birmingham, West
Party	Candidate	Votes	%	±%
Liberal Unionist	Joseph Chamberlain	Unopposed		
Liberal Unionist hold				

Birmingham, West: by-election, 14 July 1914
Party	Candidate	Votes	%	±%
Unionist	Austen Chamberlain	Unopposed		
Unionist hold				

Birmingham, West: by-election, 25 April 1918
Party	Candidate	Votes	%	±%
Unionist	Austen Chamberlain	Unopposed		
Conservative hold				

General election 1918: Birmingham, West
Party		Candidate	Votes	%	±%
C	Unionist	Austen Chamberlain	Unopposed		
	Unionist hold				
C indicates candidate endorsed by the coalition government.

=== Elections in the 1920s ===
By-election, 1921: Birmingham West
Party		Candidate	Votes	%	±%
C	Unionist	Austen Chamberlain	Unopposed		
	Unionist hold				
C indicates candidate endorsed by the coalition government.

General election 1922: Birmingham West
Party	Candidate	Votes	%	±%
Unionist	Austen Chamberlain	15,405	61.6	N/A
Labour	Frank Smith	9,599	38.4	New
Majority		5,806	23.2	N/A
Turnout		25,004	67.1	N/A
Registered electors		37,263		
Unionist hold		Swing	N/A	

General election 1923: Birmingham West
Party	Candidate	Votes	%	±%
Unionist	Austen Chamberlain	13,940	58.3	−3.3
Labour	Frank Smith	9,983	41.7	+3.3
Majority		3,957	16.6	−6.6
Turnout		23,923	63.9	−3.2
Registered electors		37,433		
Unionist hold		Swing	−3.3	

General election 1924: Birmingham West
Party	Candidate	Votes	%	±%
Unionist	Austen Chamberlain	14,801	67.4	+9.1
Communist	Robert Dunstan	7,158	32.6	New
Majority		7,643	34.8	+18.2
Turnout		21,959	58.2	−5.7
Registered electors		37,754		
Unionist hold		Swing		

General election 1929: Birmingham West
Party	Candidate	Votes	%	±%
Unionist	Austen Chamberlain	16,862	50.1	−17.3
Labour	George Willey	16,819	49.9	New
Majority		43	0.2	−34.6
Turnout		33,681	73.9	+15.7
Registered electors		45,593		
Unionist hold		Swing		

=== Elections in the 1930s ===
General election 1931: Birmingham, West
Party	Candidate	Votes	%	±%
Conservative	Austen Chamberlain	22,448	68.12	
Labour	George Willey	10,507	31.88	
Majority		11,941	36.24	
Turnout		32,955	75.86	
Conservative hold		Swing		

General election 1935: Birmingham, West
Party	Candidate	Votes	%	±%
Conservative	Austen Chamberlain	16,530	64.35	
Labour	George Willey	9,159	35.65	
Majority		7,371	28.70	
Turnout		25,689	63.59	
Conservative hold		Swing		

1937 Birmingham West by-election
Party	Candidate	Votes	%	±%
Conservative	Walter Higgs	12,552	56.58	
Labour	Richard Crossman	9,632	43.42	
Majority		2,920	13.16	
Turnout		22,184		
Conservative hold		Swing		

=== Elections 1940s ===
General election 1945: Birmingham, West
Party	Candidate	Votes	%	±%
Labour	Charles Simmons	12,639	63.54	
Conservative	Walter Higgs	7,253	36.46	
Majority		5,386	27.08	N/A
Turnout		19,892	66.94	
Labour gain from Conservative		Swing		

== See also ==
- List of former United Kingdom Parliament constituencies
