= 1937 Birmingham West by-election =

UK Parliamentary by-election

- 29 April 1937

Constituency of Birmingham West
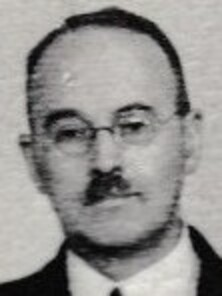

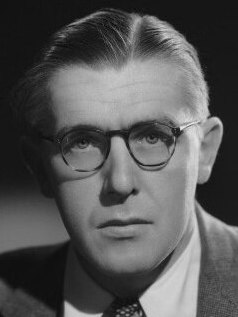
	First party	Second party
Candidate	Walter Higgs	Richard Crossman
Party	Conservative	Labour
Popular vote	12,552	9,632
Percentage	56.58%	43.42%
Swing	▼7.77%	▲7.77%
MP before election
Austen Chamberlain
Conservative
Subsequent MP
Walter Higgs
Conservative

The 1937 Birmingham West by-election was held on 29 April 1937. The by-election was held due to the death of the incumbent Conservative MP, Austen Chamberlain. It was won by the Conservative candidate Walter Higgs.

By Election 1937: Birmingham, West
Party	Candidate	Votes	%	±%
Conservative	Walter Higgs	12,552	56.6	+7.7
Labour	Richard Crossman	9,632	43.4	−7.8
Majority		2,920	13.2	−15.5
Turnout		22,184		
Conservative hold		Swing		
