= East Worcestershire =

Parliamentary constituency in the United Kingdom, 1885–1918

- Former county constituency for the House of Commons

1832–1918
- Seats: 1832–1885: Two; 1885–1918: One
- Replaced by: Kidderminster and Birmingham King's Norton

East Worcestershire was a county constituency in the county of Worcestershire, represented in the House of Commons of the Parliament of the United Kingdom.

It was created by the Reform Act 1832 for the 1832 general election, and elected two Members of Parliament (MPs), by the bloc vote system. Under the Redistribution of Seats Act 1885, its representation was reduced to one MP for the 1885 general election, elected by the first past the post voting system. The constituency was abolished for the 1918 general election.

== Boundaries ==
1832–1885: The Petty Sessional Divisions of Stourbridge, Dudley, Droitwich, Northfield, Blockley and Pershore, and the Borough of Evesham.

== Members of Parliament ==
=== MPs 1832–1885 ===
Election	First member	First party	Second member	Second party
1832	William Congreve Russell	Whig	Thomas Cookes	Whig
1835	Edward Holland	Whig	Thomas Cookes	Whig
1837	Sir Horace St Paul, Bt	Conservative	John Barneby	Conservative
1841	James Arthur Taylor	Conservative	John Barneby	Conservative
Jan. 1847 by-election	James Arthur Taylor	Conservative	George Rushout-Bowles	Conservative
Jul. 1847	John Hodgetts-Foley	Whig	George Rushout-Bowles	Conservative
Feb. 1859	John Hodgetts-Foley	Whig	Hon. Frederick Gough-Calthorpe	Whig
Apr. 1859	John Hodgetts-Foley	Liberal	Hon. Frederick Gough-Calthorpe	Liberal
1861 by-election	Harry Vernon	Liberal	Hon. Frederick Gough-Calthorpe	Liberal
Jun. 1868 by-election	Harry Vernon	Liberal	Hon. Charles Lyttelton	Liberal
Nov 1868	Richard Amphlett	Conservative	Hon. Charles Lyttelton	Liberal
1874	Henry Allsopp	Conservative	Thomas Eades Walker	Conservative
1880	William Henry Gladstone	Liberal	George Hastings	Liberal
1885	representation reduced to one member			

=== MPs 1885–1918 ===
Year	Member	Party
1885	George Hastings	Liberal
1886	George Hastings	Liberal Unionist
1892	Austen Chamberlain	Liberal Unionist
1912	Austen Chamberlain	Unionist
1914	Leverton Harris	Unionist
1918	constituency abolished	

== Elections ==
Decades:	1840s; 1850s; 1860s; 1870s; 1880s; 1890s; 1900s; 1910s

=== Elections in the 1830s ===
General election 1832: East Worcestershire (2 seats)
Party	Candidate	Votes	%
Whig	William Congreve Russell	2,576	36.8
Whig	Thomas Cookes	2,517	35.9
Tory	John Pakington	1,916	27.3
Majority		601	8.6
Turnout		4,348	84.2
Registered electors		5,161	
Whig win (new seat)			
Whig win (new seat)			

General election 1835: East Worcestershire (2 seats)
Party	Candidate	Votes	%	±%
Whig	Edward Holland	2,254	34.2	−2.6
Whig	Thomas Cookes	2,192	33.3	−2.6
Conservative	Horace St Paul	2,145	32.5	+5.2
Majority		47	0.7	−7.9
Turnout		c. 3,296	c. 63.8	c. −20.4
Registered electors		5,164		
Whig hold		Swing	−2.6	
Whig hold		Swing	−2.6	

General election 1837: East Worcestershire (2 seats)
Party	Candidate	Votes	%	±%
Conservative	Horace St Paul	2,595	27.4	+11.2
Conservative	John Barneby	2,528	26.7	+10.5
Whig	Edward Holland	2,175	23.0	−11.2
Whig	John Hodgetts-Foley	2,168	22.9	−10.4
Majority		427	4.5	N/A
Majority		353	3.7	N/A
Turnout		4,771	79.6	c. +15.8
Registered electors		5,995		
Conservative gain from Whig		Swing	+11.0	
Conservative gain from Whig		Swing	+10.7	

=== Elections in the 1840s ===
General election 1841: East Worcestershire (2 seats)
Party	Candidate	Votes	%	±%
Conservative	James Arthur Taylor	Unopposed		
Conservative	John Barneby	Unopposed		
Registered electors		6,367		
Conservative hold				
Conservative hold				

Barneby's death caused a by-election.

By-election, 11 January 1847: East Worcestershire (1 seat)
Party	Candidate	Votes	%	±%
Conservative	George Rushout	Unopposed		
Conservative hold				

General election 1847: East Worcestershire (2 seats)
Party	Candidate	Votes	%	±%
Whig	John Hodgetts-Foley	Unopposed		
Conservative	George Rushout	Unopposed		
Registered electors		6,269		
Whig hold				
Conservative hold				

=== Elections in the 1850s ===
General election 1852: East Worcestershire (2 seats)
Party	Candidate	Votes	%	±%
Whig	John Hodgetts-Foley	Unopposed		
Conservative	George Rushout	Unopposed		
Registered electors		6,515		
Whig hold				
Conservative hold				

General election 1857: East Worcestershire (2 seats)
Party	Candidate	Votes	%	±%
Whig	John Hodgetts-Foley	Unopposed		
Conservative	George Rushout	Unopposed		
Registered electors		6,065		
Whig hold				
Conservative hold				

Rushout succeeded to the peerage, becoming 3rd Baron Northwick and causing a by-election.

By-election, 24 February 1859: East Worcestershire
Party	Candidate	Votes	%	±%
Whig	Frederick Gough-Calthorpe	2,304	54.0	N/A
Conservative	Sir John Pakington, 2nd Baron Hampton	1,965	46.0	N/A
Majority		339	8.0	N/A
Turnout		4,269	71.4	N/A
Registered electors		5,983		
Whig gain from Conservative		Swing	N/A	

General election 1859: East Worcestershire (2 seats)
Party	Candidate	Votes	%	±%
Liberal	John Hodgetts-Foley	Unopposed		
Liberal	Frederick Gough-Calthorpe	Unopposed		
Registered electors		5,983		
Liberal hold				
Liberal gain from Conservative				

=== Elections in the 1860s ===
Hodgetts-Foley's death caused a by-election.

By-election, 20 December 1861: East Worcestershire
Party	Candidate	Votes	%	±%
Liberal	Harry Vernon	Unopposed		
Liberal hold				

General election 1865: East Worcestershire (2 seats)
Party	Candidate	Votes	%	±%
Liberal	Harry Vernon	Unopposed		
Liberal	Frederick Gough-Calthorpe	Unopposed		
Registered electors		6,875		
Liberal hold				
Liberal hold				

Gough-Calthorpe succeeded to the peerage, becoming 5th Baron Calthorpe and causing a by-election.

By-election, 1 June 1868: East Worcestershire
Party	Candidate	Votes	%	±%
Liberal	Charles Lyttelton	2,688	52.5	N/A
Conservative	William Laslett	2,429	47.5	New
Majority		259	5.0	N/A
Turnout		5,117	74.4	N/A
Registered electors		6,875		
Liberal hold		Swing	N/A	

General election 1868: East Worcestershire (2 seats)
Party	Candidate	Votes	%	±%
Conservative	Richard Amphlett	4,108	34.3	N/A
Liberal	Charles Lyttelton	4,093	34.1	N/A
Liberal	Richard Martin	3,789	31.6	N/A
Majority		319	2.7	N/A
Turnout		8,049 (est)	78.0 (est)	N/A
Registered electors		10,313		
Conservative gain from Liberal		Swing	N/A	
Liberal hold		Swing	N/A	

=== Elections in the 1870s ===
General election 1874: East Worcestershire (2 seats)
Party	Candidate	Votes	%	±%
Conservative	Henry Allsopp	4,421	29.5	+12.3
Conservative	Thomas Eades Walker	4,159	27.8	+10.6
Liberal	Charles Lyttelton	3,508	23.4	−10.7
Liberal	Arthur Albright	2,831	18.9	−12.7
Conservative	William Laslett	55	0.4	N/A
Majority		651	4.4	N/A
Turnout		7,487 (est)	67.8 (est)	−10.2
Registered electors		11,039		
Conservative hold		Swing	+12.0	
Conservative gain from Liberal		Swing	+11.2	

- Laslett withdrew from the race in order to contest Worcester.

=== Elections in the 1880s ===
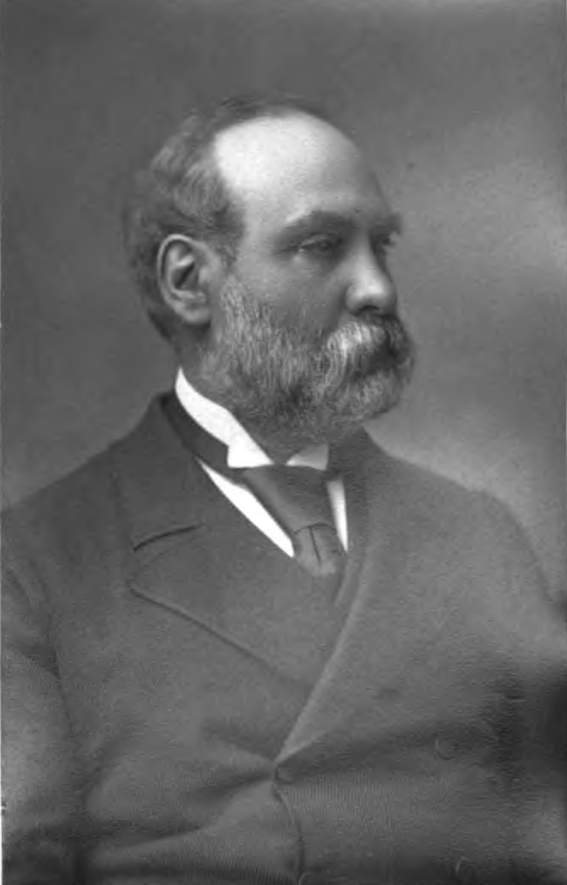
Hastings

General election 1880: East Worcestershire (2 seats)
Party	Candidate	Votes	%	±%
Liberal	William Henry Gladstone	4,879	26.5	+3.2
Liberal	George Hastings	4,833	26.3	+7.4
Conservative	Richard Temple	4,417	24.0	−3.8
Conservative	Henry Allsopp	4,258	23.2	−6.3
Majority		621	3.3	N/A
Majority		416	2.3	N/A
Turnout		9,194 (est)	76.6 (est)	+8.8
Registered electors		12,000		
Liberal gain from Conservative		Swing	+3.5	
Liberal gain from Conservative		Swing	+6.9	

General election 1885: East Worcestershire
Party	Candidate	Votes	%	±%
Liberal	George Hastings	3,685	53.6	+0.8
Conservative	Albert Bosanquet	3,194	46.4	−0.8
Majority		491	7.2	+4.9
Turnout		6,879	84.0	+7.4 (est)
Registered electors		8,187		
Liberal hold		Swing	+0.8	

General election 1886: East Worcestershire
Party	Candidate	Votes	%	±%
Liberal Unionist	George Hastings	Unopposed		
Liberal Unionist gain from Liberal				

=== Elections in the 1890s ===
Hastings was expelled from the House of Commons, causing a by-election.

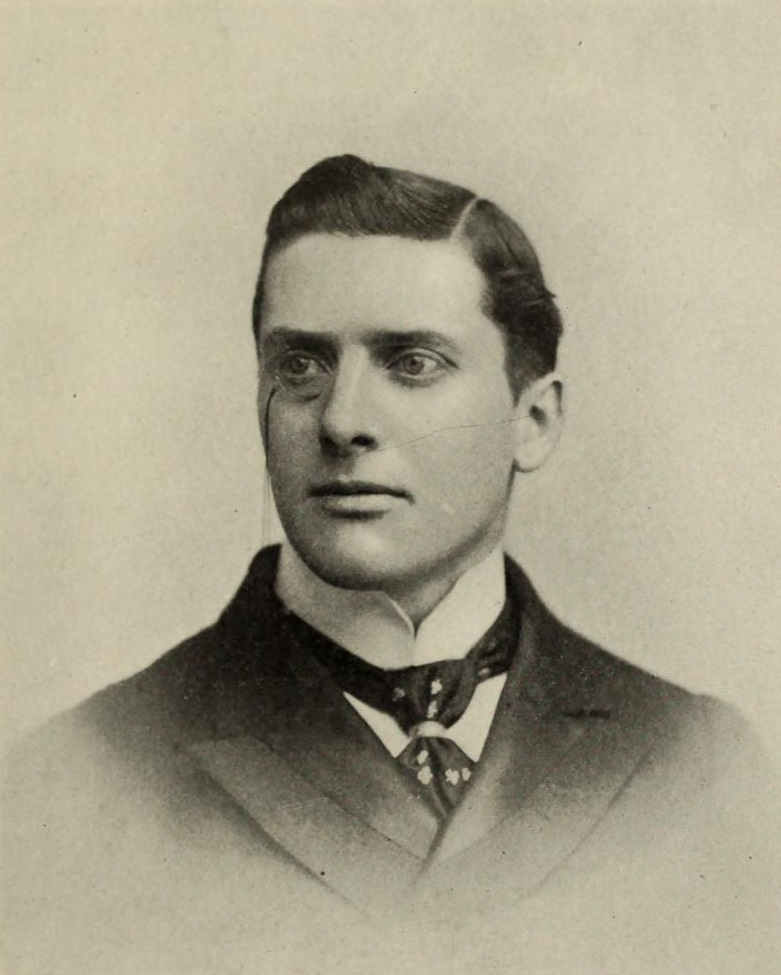
Chamberlain

By-election, 30 Mar 1892: East Worcestershire
Party	Candidate	Votes	%	±%
Liberal Unionist	Austen Chamberlain	Unopposed		
Liberal Unionist hold				

General election 1892: East Worcestershire
Party	Candidate	Votes	%	±%
Liberal Unionist	Austen Chamberlain	5,111	67.0	N/A
Liberal	Oscar Browning	2,517	33.0	New
Majority		2,594	34.0	N/A
Turnout		7,628	77.6	N/A
Registered electors		9,827		
Liberal Unionist hold				

General election 1895: East Worcestershire
Party	Candidate	Votes	%	±%
Liberal Unionist	Austen Chamberlain	Unopposed		
Liberal Unionist hold				

=== Elections in the 1900s ===
General election 1900: East Worcestershire
Party	Candidate	Votes	%	±%
Liberal Unionist	Austen Chamberlain	Unopposed		
Liberal Unionist hold				

1902 East Worcestershire by-election
Party	Candidate	Votes	%	±%
Liberal Unionist	Austen Chamberlain	Unopposed		
Liberal Unionist hold				

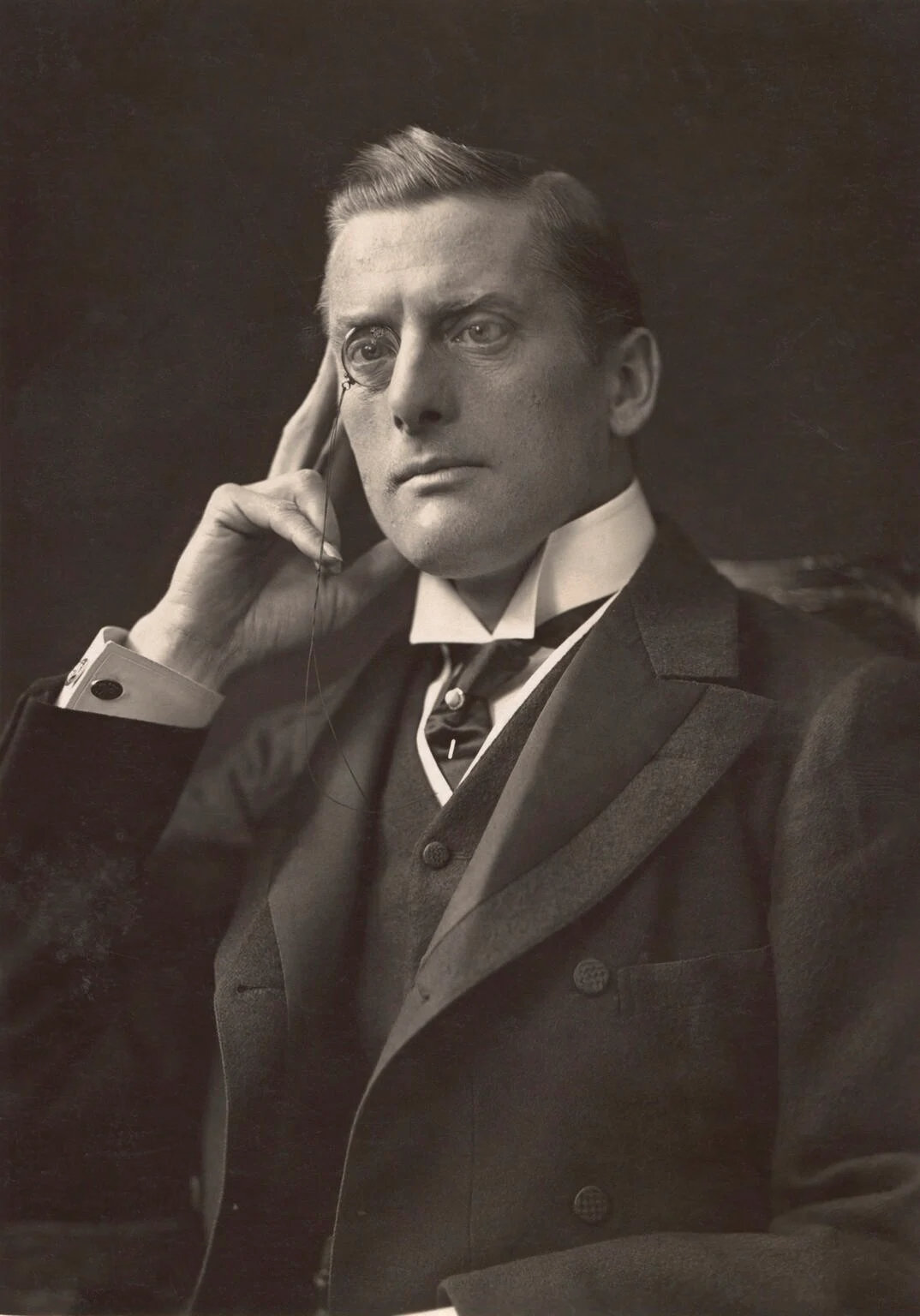
Chamberlain

General election 1906: East Worcestershire
Party	Candidate	Votes	%	±%
Liberal Unionist	Austen Chamberlain	10,129	63.7	N/A
Liberal	John Morgan	5,763	36.3	New
Majority		4,366	27.4	N/A
Turnout		15,892	84.7	N/A
Registered electors		18,769		
Liberal Unionist hold				

=== Elections in the 1910s ===
Young

General election January 1910: East Worcestershire
Party	Candidate	Votes	%	±%
Liberal Unionist	Austen Chamberlain	12,644	64.5	+0.8
Liberal	Hilton Young	6,955	35.5	−0.8
Majority		5,689	29.0	+1.6
Turnout		19,599	84.2	−0.5
Liberal Unionist hold		Swing	+0.8	

General election December 1910: East Worcestershire
Party	Candidate	Votes	%	±%
Liberal Unionist	Austen Chamberlain	Unopposed		
Liberal Unionist hold				

1914 East Worcestershire by-election
Party	Candidate	Votes	%	±%
Unionist	Leverton Harris	Unopposed		
Unionist hold				

General Election 1914–15:

Another General Election was required to take place before the end of 1915. The political parties had been making preparations for an election to take place and by July 1914, the following candidates had been selected;

- Unionist: Leverton Harris
- Liberal: Wilfrid Hill
