= John Hodgetts-Foley =

British MP

John Hodgetts Hodgetts-Foley (17 July 1797 – 13 November 1861), born John Hodgetts Foley, of Prestwood House (then in Kingswinford, and now in Kinver) in Staffordshire was a British MP.

He was the second son of the Hon. Edward Foley of Stoke Edith, Herefordshire and his wife Eliza Maria Foley Hodgetts. He inherited the Prestwood estate from his mother, whose mother Eliza Foley was a descendant of Philip Foley.

He represented the borough of Droitwich in Parliament from 1822 to 1835 as a Whig and East Worcestershire from 1847 to 1861 (initially as a Whig and from 1859 as a Liberal).

He married Charlotte Margaret Gage, daughter of John Gage and Mary Milbanke and granddaughter of General Thomas Gage and Margaret Kemble, on 20 October 1825. Their son was Henry John Wentworth Hodgetts-Foley

Parliament of the United Kingdom
Preceded by The Earl of Sefton; Thomas Foley	Member of Parliament for Droitwich; 1822–1835; With: The Earl of Sefton 1822–1831; Sir Thomas Winnington, Bt 1831–1832	Succeeded by John Barneby
Preceded by James Arthur Taylor; George Rushout-Bowes	Member of Parliament for East Worcestershire; 1847–1861; With: George Rushout-Bowes 1847–1859; Frederick Gough-Calthorpe 1859–1861	Succeeded by Frederick Gough-Calthorpe; Harry Vernon
