= Statement relating to Defence =

The Statement relating to Defence was a United Kingdom government white paper published 4 March 1935 that started the rearmament of the UK during the 1930s. The paper, released by the War Office noted that, despite the creation of the League of Nations, "adequate defences are still required".
