= Sir Horace St Paul, 2nd Baronet =

British landowner and politician

Sir Horace St Paul, 2nd Baronet (29 December 1812 – 1891) was a British landowner and politician, who represented East Worcestershire in Parliament between 1837 and 1841.

Horace St Paul was born on 29 December 1812, the only son of Horace St Paul, MP for Bridport, and Anna Maria, the illegitimate daughter of John Ward, 2nd Viscount Dudley and Ward. His father inherited a title as a count of the Austrian Empire that same year and was awarded the title of baronet in 1813. He was educated at Christ Church, Oxford.

St Paul contested East Worcestershire as a Conservative at the 1835 general election, when he was narrowly defeated by two Whig candidates, and again at the 1837 general election, when he was returned along with another Conservative. The 1837 election was said to have cost him around £16,000. He stood down at the 1841 general election due to ill health.

On his father's death in October 1840 he inherited an estate of over £100,000, together with the Austrian countship and the baronetcy. He owned property at Ellowes Hall near Dudley and Ewart Park near Wooler, Northumberland. He married Jane Eliza Grey in 1867, and had one daughter, Maria, born 1868. He died 28 May 1891, when the baronetcy became extinct.
