= Atkyns =

Atkyns is a surname. Notable people with the surname include:

- Charlotte Atkyns (1757–1836), English actor and agent
- Edward Atkyns (judge) (1587–1669), English judge and baron of the exchequer of the Commonwealth period
- Edward Atkyns (politician) (c. 1630–1698), his son, English lawyer and politician
- John Tracy Atkyns (died 1773), English barrister-at-law and compiler of the Atkyns' Reports
- Robert Atkyns (disambiguation), multiple people, including:
  - Robert Atkyns (judge) (1621–1707), English judge and baron of the Exchequer
  - Robert Atkyns (topographer) (1647–1711), English antiquary and historian
- Richard Atkyns (1615–1677), English writer on printing

== See also ==
- Atkins (disambiguation)
