= Thomas Biggs =

Thomas Biggs may refer to:

- Sir Thomas Biggs (politician, died 1613) (c. 1542–1613), English MP for Evesham, 1604–1611
- Sir Thomas Biggs, 1st Baronet (c. 1577–1621), his son, English politician, MP for Evesham, 1614–1622
- Thomas Biggs of Biggs Island
- Tom Biggs (born 1984), rugby union footballer

== See also ==
- Biggs (surname)
