= De la Bère baronets =

Extinct baronetcy in the Baronetage of the United Kingdom

The De la Bère Baronetcy, of Crowborough in the County of Sussex, was a title in the Baronetage of the United Kingdom. It was created on 18 November 1953 for Rupert De la Bère, Conservative Member of Parliament for Evesham and South Worcestershire and Lord Mayor of London. He was descended from the de La Bere family of Southam de la Bere in Gloucestershire. The baronetcy became extinct on the death of the 3rd baronet, who never proved his succession, on 10 February 2017.

== De la Bère baronets, of Crowborough (1953) ==
- Sir Rupert De la Bère, 1st Baronet (1893–1978)
- Sir Cameron De la Bère, 2nd Baronet (1933–2014)
- Sir Adrian De la Bère, 3rd Baronet (1939–2017)

Coat of arms of De la Bère baronets
Crest Issuant from an ancient crown Or a plume of five ostrich feathers Argent charged with a ladybird Proper. Escutcheon Argent on a fess between three crescent Sable a lizard of the field. Motto Prest Pour Le Roy (Ready for the King)
