= Sir Abraham Cullen, 1st Baronet =

English merchant and politician

Sir Abraham Cullen, 1st Baronet (c.1624–1668), of East Sheen Surrey, was an English merchant and politician who sat in the House of Commons from 1661 to 1668.

Cullen was the eldest son of Abraham Cullen, merchant, of Great St Helens, London and his first wife. Abigail Moonens, daughter of Martin Moonens, hosier, of Norwich, Norfolk. He married at St Dionis Backchurch on. 10 December 1650 Abigail Rushout, daughter of John Rushout, Fishmonger, of London and Marylords, Essex and his first wife Anne Godschalk, daughter of Joas Godschalk of London. He succeeded his father in 1658. He became a captain of the foot militia for Surrey in April 1660, and a Justice of the Peace in July 1660.

Cullen was returned unopposed as Member of Parliament for Evesham at the 1661 English general election to the Cavalier Parliament. On 17 June 1661, he was created baronet. He was a Commissioner for assessment for London and Surrey for the rest of his life from 1661 and a Commissioner for assessment for Evesham from 1663 to 1664.

In Parliament, Cullen was appointed to 22 committees, most of which were concerned with commerce or finance. He was one of the Members appointed to inspect the accounts of the disbandment commissioners. He was on the committee for the Wey Navigation bill promoted by his colleague William Sandys in 1664. His only recorded speech was on 6 March 1668, when he proposed a tax on coaches, but no one would second his proposal.

Cullen died intestate on 28 August 1668 and was buried on 2 September at Mortlake. He had three surviving sons and six daughters by his wife Abigail. She died in 1678 and was also buried at Mortlake. He was succeeded in the baronetcy by his eldest son John and then by his second son Rushout.

Parliament of England
| Preceded by John Egioke; Sir Thomas Rouse | Member of Parliament for Evesham; 1661–1668; With: William Sandys | Succeeded by William Sandys; Sir John Hanmer |
Baronetage of England
| New creation | Baronet (of East Sheen); 1661-1668 | Succeeded by John Cullen |
