= Cullen baronets =

Extinct baronetcy in the Baronetage of England

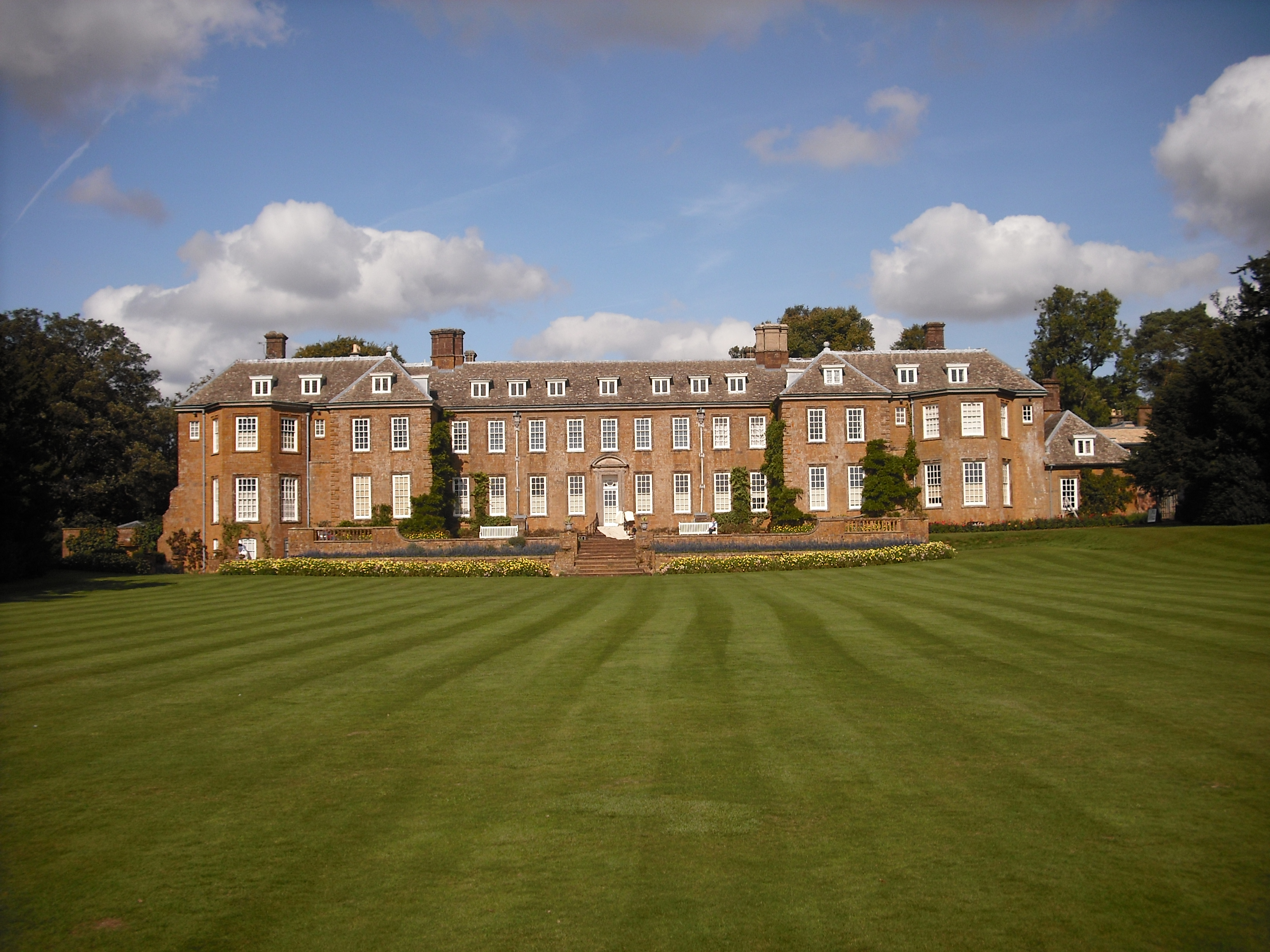
Upton House, pre-extension was commissioned by the 3rd Baronet, who having sold the largest estate at the time in East Sheen, bought its forerunner smaller property for £7,000 in 1688, in general spending power equivalent to £1,589,972 in 2023. It was further developed by nobility, is among the ten largest homes in Warwickshire and is run by the National Trust.

The Cullen Baronetcy, of East Sheen, was created in the Baronetage of England on 17 June 1661 for Abraham Cullen, Member of Parliament for Evesham 1661–1668.

His second son, the third baronet, Sir Rushout Cullen, Member of Parliament for Cambridge bought the manor in the hamlet of Upton, Warwickshire along with woodland, cultivated fields and pasture. He replaced its manor house with a surviving National Trust property, Upton House (1688–1695) and the baronetcy became extinct on his death in 1730.

== Cullen of East Sheen (1661) ==
- Sir Abraham Cullen, 1st Baronet (1624–1668)
- Sir John Cullen, 2nd Baronet (1652–1677)
- Sir Rushout Cullen, 3rd Baronet (1661–1730)
