= Theophilus Andrews =

English lawyer and politician

Theophilus Andrews (ca. 1623 – 1670) was an English lawyer and politician who sat in the House of Commons in 1659.

Andrews was possibly the son of Richard Andrews, Mayor of Evesham 1624. He was sometime of Barnard's Inn and was admitted to Gray's Inn on 7 November 1644. He was called to the bar on 11 February 1651. In 1656 he was appointed Commissioner for Assessment for Worcestershire. In 1659 he was an Alderman of Evesham and was elected Member of Parliament for Evesham in the Third Protectorate Parliament. He was re-elected MP for Evesham in 1660 for the Convention Parliament in a double return and was unseated on 12 July 1660. He became a J.P. for Worcestershire on 10 July 1660 and was residing at Offingham. He became recorder of Evesham, probably in 1661.

Andrews died in 1670 at the age of 47.

Parliament of England
Preceded by Not represented in Second Protectorate Parliament	Member of Parliament for Evesham; 1659; With: Robert Atkyns	Succeeded by Not represented in Restored Rump
