= Richard Cresheld =

English politician

Richard Cresheld (died 1652) was an English judge and politician who sat in the House of Commons variously between 1624 and 1648.

== Biography ==
Cresheld was the son of Edward Cresheld of Mattishall Norfolk. He was admitted to Lincoln's Inn on 18 June 1608 and called to the bar on 17 October 1615. He was recorder of Evesham in 1625.

In 1624, Cresheld was elected Member of Parliament for Evesham. He was re-elected MP for the town in 1625 and 1628 and sat until 1629 when King Charles decided to rule without parliament for eleven years. Cresheld spoke strongly in the wake of the Five Knights' case when King Charles had attempted to imprison five knights for refusal to pay loans. He and his fellow MPs believed that the King had broken the "fundamental laws and liberties" of England. He spoke of "the great care which the law hath ever taken of the liberty and safety of the bodies and persons of the subjects of this kingdom" and held "that the act of power in imprisoning and confining his Majesty's subjects in such manner without any declaration of the cause, is against the fundamental laws and liberties of this realm". He added that the "kings of England have a 'monarchical' state, not a 'seignoral'; the first makes freedom, the second slavery". This debate led on to the Petition of Right.

Cresheld was made a bencher of Lincoln's Inn in May 1633, Lent Reader in 1636 and sergeant-at-law in 1637. In March 1637, he was appointed a commissioner to compensate river proprietors for damage caused by improving navigation of the River Avon.

In November 1640, Cresheld was elected MP for Evesham in the Long Parliament. In February 1643 representatives of Parliament travelled to Oxford to treat with King Charles. Article eight of the Parliament's petition to Charles proposed Cresheld be appointed a Baron of the Exchequer, but the negotiations failed and the treaty of Oxford was still born. He was made Justice of the Common Pleas by parliament on 12 October 1648, but refused to be resworn after the execution of the King in January 1649. Cresheld died in Serjeant's Inn and was buried in St Andrew's Holborn in 1652.

== Family ==
Cresheld's daughter Mary married William Draper of Kent and was the mother of Cresheld Draper. She later married John Egioke MP for Evesham in 1660. His daughter Bridget married Sylvanus Wood MP for Gloucestershire in 1654.

== Notes ==
Parliament of England
Preceded by Sir Thomas Biggs, Bt; Anthony Langston	Member of Parliament for Evesham; 1624–1629; With: Sir Edward Conway 1624; Anthony Langston 1625–1626; Sir Robert Harley	Parliament suspended until 1640
Preceded by William Sandys; William Morton	Member of Parliament for Evesham; 1640–1648; With: William Sandys 1640–1641; John Coventry 1641–1642; Samuel Gardner 1645–1648	Succeeded by Samuel Gardner
