= Anthony Langston =

English politician

Anthony Langston was an English politician who sat in the House of Commons at various times between 1614 and 1626. He supported the Royalist cause in the English Civil War.

Langston was the son of Henry Langston of Sedgeberrow, Littleton. He was appointed with John Izod by Lord Cecil to be Steward of King's Norton in February 1604. In 1614, he was elected Member of Parliament for Evesham. He was re-elected MP for Evesham in 1621, 1625 and 1626.

Langston supported the King in the Civil War and was elected an Honorary Freeman of Worcester in 1643. He was taken prisoner at the end of the Siege of Worcester when the city surrendered on 19 July 1646. On 21 December 1646 he begged to compound on Oxford articles for delinquency, and for leave to attend and perfect his composition.

Parliament of England
Preceded by Thomas Biggs; Edward Salter	Member of Parliament for Evesham; 1614–1622; With: Sir Thomas Biggs	Succeeded by Sir Edward Conway; Richard Cresheld
Preceded by Sir Edward Conway; Richard Cresheld	Member of Parliament for Evesham; 1625–1626; With: Richard Cresheld 1625; Sir John Hare 1626	Succeeded by Sir Robert Harley; Richard Cresheld
