= Sir Henry Willoughby, 3rd Baronet =

British politician

Sir Henry Pollard Willoughby, 3rd Baronet (17 November 1796 – 23 March 1865) was a British Conservative Member of Parliament. He represented the constituencies of Newcastle-under-Lyme (12 December 1832 – 5 January 1835), Yarmouth (Isle of Wight) (3 May 1831 – 1832) and Evesham (29 July 1847 – 7 July 1852).

Parliament of the United Kingdom
Preceded by William Yates Peel; George Lowther Thompson	Member of Parliament for Yarmouth (Isle of Wight); 1831–1832; With: Charles Compton Cavendish	Constituency abolished
Preceded by William Henry Miller; Edmund Peel	Member of Parliament for Newcastle-under-Lyme; 1832–1835; With: William Henry Miller	Succeeded by William Henry Miller; Edmund Peel
Preceded by Lord Marcus Hill; Peter Borthwick	Member of Parliament for Evesham; 1847–1865; With: Lord Marcus Hill 1847–1852; Grenville Berkeley 1852–1855; Edward Holland 1855–1865	Succeeded by Edward Holland; James Bourne
Baronetage of Great Britain
Preceded by Christopher Willoughby	Baronet (of Baldon House); 1813–1865	Succeeded by John Willoughby
