= Philip Knightley =

Sir Philip Knightley (c. 1567 – 1605) was an English politician who sat in the House of Commons from 1604 to 1605.

Knightley was the son of Bartholomew Knightley of South Littleton and his wife Anne Tolley, daughter of Philip Tolley. He matriculated at Broadgates Hall, Oxford on 31 May 1583, aged 16. In October 1602 he was appointed a Teller of the Exchequer, which office he held until his death. He was knighted on 23 July 1603. He was granted the Receivership of the First Fruits and Tenths of the Clergy for life on 7 Feb. 1604. In 1604, he was elected Member of Parliament for Evesham. The hereditary rank of Alderman of Evesham was granted to him by express provision by the new charter of 3 April 1605. This honour survived until 1705.

Knightley died shortly before 16 April 1605.

Parliament of England
Preceded by Franchise in abbeyance	Member of Parliament for Evesham; 1604–1605; With: Thomas Biggs	Succeeded by Robert Bowyer; Thomas Biggs
