= Rupert De la Bère =

British businessman, soldier and Conservative Party politician

Sir Rupert De la Bère Bt KCVO KStJ

Lord Mayor of London
- In office 1952–1953

Member of Parliament for South Worcestershire
- In office 1950 – 26 May 1955
- Succeeded by: Peter Agnew

Member of Parliament for Evesham
- In office 14 November 1935 – 1950
- Preceded by: Sir Bolton Eyres-Monsell

Personal details
- Born: 16 June 1893
- Died: 25 February 1978 (aged 84)
- Party: Conservative

Sir Rupert De la Bère, 1st Baronet (16 June 1893 – 25 February 1978) was a British businessman, soldier, and Conservative Party politician. He was the 625th Lord Mayor of London.

== Biography ==
He was the son of Reginald De la Bère from Addlestone in Surrey, educated at Tonbridge School, and during World War I served overseas with the East Surrey Regiment and the Royal Air Force.

After the war he became a director of Hay's Wharf and an Alderman of the City of London for the Tower ward. He was elected a Sheriff of the City of London for 1941-42 and the Lord Mayor of London for 1952–53. He was the first member of the Skinners Company to hold the office of Lord Mayor since Sir Robert Kite in 1766, and no other Skinner has been Lord Mayor since.

He was elected at the 1935 general election as the Member of Parliament for Evesham, and held the seat until the constituency was abolished at the 1950 general election. He was then elected for the new South Worcestershire constituency, and held that seat until he stood down at the 1955 general election.

He was knighted in June 1952, appointed Knight Commander of the Royal Victorian Order in the Coronation Honours of June 1953, and a baronet (of Crowborough) in November 1953. He was appointed Knight of the Order of the Dannebrog (Denmark), Knight of the Order of St. John of Jerusalem, and Knight of the Order of the Polar Star (Sweden).

In 1919, he married Marguerite Humphery, daughter of Sir John Humphery. She died in 1969.

Coat of arms of Rupert De la Bère
Crest Issuant from an ancient crown Or a plume of five ostrich feathers Argent charged with a ladybird Proper. Escutcheon Argent on a fess between three crescent Sable a lizard of the field. Motto Prest Pour Le Roy (Ready For The King)

Parliament of the United Kingdom
Preceded by Bolton Eyres-Monsell	Member of Parliament for Evesham; 1935 – 1950	Constituency abolished
New constituency	Member of Parliament for South Worcestershire; 1950 – 1955	Succeeded by Peter Agnew
Civic offices
Preceded by Sir Leslie Boyce	Lord Mayor of London; 1952	Succeeded by Sir Noël Bowater
Baronetage of the United Kingdom
New creation	Baronet (of Crowborough); 1953 – 1978	Succeeded by Cameron De la Bère
