= Samuel Gardner (English politician) =

Samuel Gardner was an English politician who sat in the House of Commons from 1645 to 1648.

Gardner was the son or a kinsman of Philip Gardner who was mayor of Evesham in 1618. He was mayor of Evesham himself in 1625, 1633 and 1642. He was a wealthy man and on 16 January 1643 lent £1,000 without interest to Lord Brooke, the parliamentary commander. However he had considerable difficulty having the money repaid according to a series of parliamentary entries between April 1643 and May 1648. In 1645, he was elected Member of Parliament for Evesham until he was secluded under Pride's Purge in 1648. He was mayor of Evesham again in 1653. He was Lord of the Manor of Bewdley where courts were held in his name between 1670 and 1673, but he sold his title in the manor in 1674. .

Parliament of England
Preceded by John Coventry; Richard Cresheld	Member of Parliament for Evesham; 1645–1648; With: Richard Cresheld	Succeeded by Not represented in Rump Parliament
