= Charles Wigram Long =

British politician

Member of Parliament for Evesham
- In office 1895–1910
- Preceded by: Sir Edmund Lechmere, 3rd Baronet

Charles Wigram Long (1842 – 13 December 1911) was a British Conservative Party politician. He sat in the House of Commons from 1895 to 1910.

== Biography ==
Long was the son of Charles Long, who was Archdeacon of the East Riding of Yorkshire, and his wife Anna Maria, the daughter of Sir Robert Wigram, 1st Baronet. He entered the Royal Artillery in 1860, becoming a captain in 1874, a brevet major in 1881, and a lieutenant-colonel (retired) in 1886. He later became a justice of the peace and a deputy lieutenant of Worcestershire.

=== Political career and interests ===
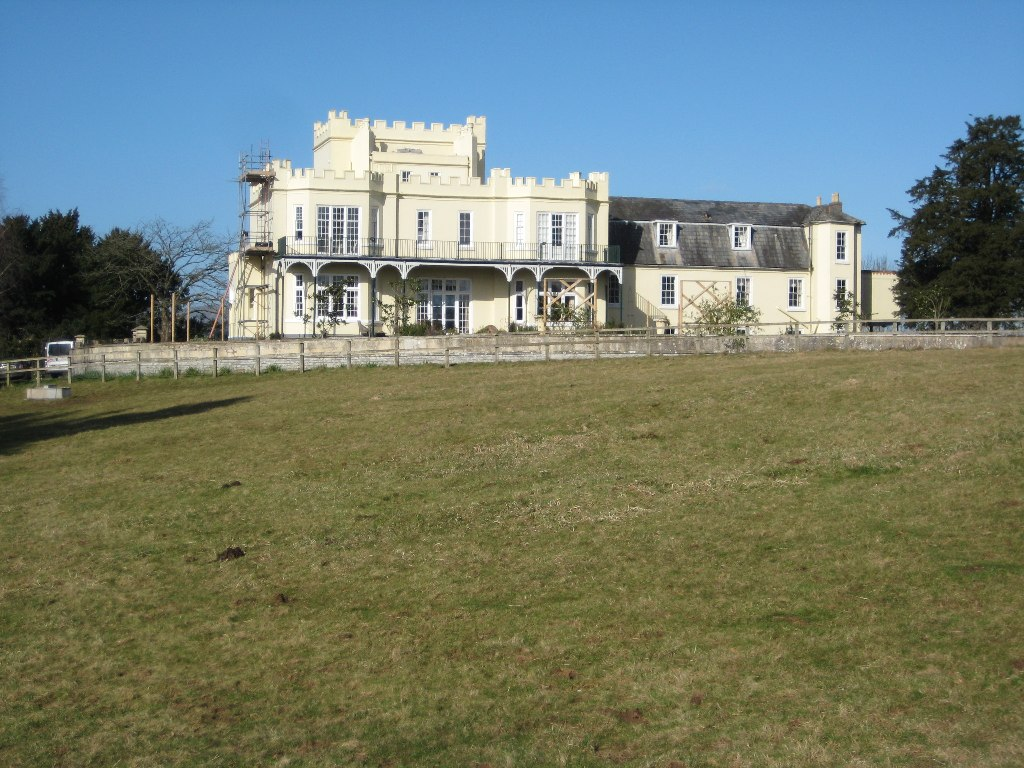
Long lived at Severn Bank House

Long was elected at the 1895 general election as the Member of Parliament (MP) for the Evesham division of Worcestershire, and held the seat until he stood down at the January 1910 general election. He had succeeded Sir Edmund Lechmere, 3rd Baronet, as Evesham's M.P.

== Family ==
In 1889 Long married Constance Vansittart, daughter of Lieutenant-Colonel Robert Vansittart of the Coldstream Guards.

Parliament of the United Kingdom
Preceded by Sir Edmund Lechmere, Bt	Member of Parliament for Evesham; 1895 – January 1910	Succeeded by Bolton Eyres-Monsell
