= Robert Atkyns =

Robert Atkyns may refer to:

- Sir Robert Atkyns (judge) (1620–1710), English judge and baron of the Exchequer
- Sir Robert Atkyns (topographer) (1647–1711), English antiquary and historian

== See also ==
- Robert Atkins (disambiguation)
