= Edward Salter =

English politician

Sir Edward Salter was an English politician who sat in the House of Commons in 1610 and from 1621 to 1622.

Salter was probably the son of Thomas Salter of Oswestry, Shropshire and was probably admitted to Gray's Inn in 1580. In 1610, he was elected Member of Parliament for Evesham. He was elected MP for Lostwithiel in 1621. He was knighted at Ampthill on 21 July 1621.

Parliament of England
Preceded by Thomas Biggs; Robert Bowyer	Member of Parliament for Evesham; 1610; With: Thomas Biggs	Succeeded by Sir Thomas Biggs, 1st Baronet; Anthony Langston
Preceded by Edward Leech; Sir Henry Vane	Member of Parliament for Lostwithiel; 1621–1622; With: George Chudleigh	Succeeded by Sir John Chichester; Sir John Hobart
