= Sir James Bourne, 1st Baronet =

British politician (1812–1882)

Sir James Bourne, 1st Baronet, CB, DL, JP (8 October 1812 – 14 March 1882) was an English Conservative Party politician who sat in the House of Commons from 1865 to 1880.

Bourne was the son of Peter Bourne of Hackinsall, Lancashire, and Heathfield, Liverpool, and his wife Margaret Drinkwater, daughter of James Drinkwater of Bent, Lancashire. He was educated at Shrewsbury School. He was a deputy lieutenant and justice of the peace for Lancashire. He was also Lieutenant-Colonel Commandant of the Royal Lancashire Militia Artillery, and Colonel of the 4th Brigade Lancashire Artillery Volunteers.

Bourne stood for parliament unsuccessfully at Wexford in 1841. At the 1865 general election Bourne was elected as a member of parliament (MP) for Evesham. He held the seat until 1880.

He was made a baronet, of Hackinsall Hall, in the parish of Stalmine, and of Heathfield, in the parish of Childwall, both in the County Palatine of Lancaster, on 10 May 1880. He was appointed Companion of the Order of the Bath (CB) in the 1881 Birthday Honours.

In 1841, Bourne married Sarah Harriet Dyson, daughter of Thomas Fournis Dyson of Willow Hall, Yorkshire, and of Everton, near Liverpool. They had children. He died at the age of 69, at his home of Heathfield House in Wavertree near Liverpool, and his son succeeded him briefly in the baronetcy.

Parliament of the United Kingdom
| Preceded by Sir Henry Willoughby, Bt; Edward Holland | Member of Parliament for Evesham; 1865 – 1880; With: Edward Holland to 1868 | Succeeded by Daniel Rowlinson Ratcliff |
Baronetage of the United Kingdom
| New creation | Baronet (of Hackinsall Hall and Heathfield ) 1880–1882 | Succeeded by James Dyson Bourne |
