= Robert Aldington =

British politician

Robert Aldington (1872 – 8 August 1956) was a British politician.

Born in North Littleton, in Worcestershire, Aldington received an elementary education, then at the age of ten began working as an agricultural labourer. He later worked on the railways, and joined the Amalgamated Society of Railway Servants (ASRS), becoming the secretary of its Worcester branch.

Through the ASRS, and its successor, the National Union of Railwaymen, Aldington became active in the Labour Party. He also became a smallholder, and served on many occasions as president of the Littleton & Badsey Growers. In 1919, he was elected to the Evesham Rural District Council, and also the Evesham Board of Guardians. He also served on Offenham Parish Council, becoming its chair.

Aldington stood in Evesham at the 1922, 1923, 1924 and 1929 UK general elections. In 1922, he took 40.1% of the vote against a single, Conservative, opponent, but at each of the other elections he also faced a Liberal Party opponent, and took less than 20% of the votes cast.

Aldington was later elected to Worcestershire County Council. In the 1949 Birthday Honours, he was made an Officer of the Order of the British Empire. He died in 1956, while still in office.
