= Grenville Berkeley =

British politician

Grenville Charles Lennox Berkeley (alternatively Charles Lennox Grenville Berkeley) (30 March 1806 – 25 September 1896), also known as C. L. Grenville Berkeley, was a British Liberal Party politician. He served as Parliamentary Secretary to the Board of Trade from 1853 to 1856.

== Background and early life ==
Berkeley was born in London, England, the younger son of Admiral the Honourable Sir George Cranfield Berkeley, third son of Augustus Berkeley, 4th Earl of Berkeley. His mother was Lady Emilia Charlotte Lennox, daughter of Lord George Lennox. Sir George Berkeley was his elder brother. He became a lieutenant in the 28th Foot in 1825, promoted to captain in 1826 but was placed on half-pay in 1827.

== Political career ==
Berkeley unsuccessfully contested Western Gloucestershire at the 1847 general election, and was elected as the Member of Parliament (MP) for Cheltenham at a by-election in September 1848, after the result of a by-election in June that year had been voided after an election petition. At the 1852 general election, Berkeley stepped aside in favour of Craven Fitzhardinge Berkeley, the winner of the 1848 by-election, but stood instead in Evesham, where he won the seat. In early 1853 he was appointed Parliamentary Secretary to the Poor Law Board by Lord Aberdeen, a post he held until 1856, the last year under the premiership of Lord Palmerston.

Craven Berkeley died in 1855 and Charles Berkeley resigned his Evesham seat on 6 July 1855 through appointment as Steward of the Chiltern Hundreds, to contest the resulting vacancy in Cheltenham. He won the Cheltenham by-election in July 1855, but held the seat for less than a year, until he resigned on 2 May 1856 (again through taking the Chiltern Hundreds), to become a Commissioner of Customs, and office he retained until November 1886.

== Family ==
Berkeley married Augusta Elizabeth Leigh, daughter of James Henry Leigh and sister of Chandos Leigh, 1st Baron Leigh, in 1827. They had two daughters Alice (24 June 1829 – 9 April 1919) and Georgina Louisa (4 January 1831 – 22 December 1919). Berkeley died in September 1896, aged 90.

Parliament of the United Kingdom
Preceded by Craven Berkeley	Member of Parliament for Cheltenham; 1848–1852	Succeeded by Craven Berkeley
Preceded by Lord Marcus Hill; Sir Henry Willoughby, Bt	Member of Parliament for Evesham; 1852 – 1855; With: Sir Henry Willoughby, Bt	Succeeded by Edward Holland; Sir Henry Willoughby, Bt
Preceded by Craven Berkeley	Member of Parliament for Cheltenham; 1855–1856	Succeeded by Francis Berkeley
Political offices
Preceded by Frederick Knight	Parliamentary Secretary to the Poor Law Board; 1853–1858	Succeeded by Ralph Grey
