= Robert Atkins =

Robert Atkins may refer to:

- Robert Atkins (physician) (1930–2003), American physician noted for the Atkins diet
- Robert Atkins (actor) (1886–1972), British film and theatre actor
- Robert Atkins (politician) (born 1946), British politician
- Robert Atkins (comics) (born 1979), American comics artist
- Bob Atkins (footballer) (born 1962), English footballer
- Bob Atkins (American football) (1946–2020), American football player

== See also ==
- Robert Atkyns (disambiguation)
