= European Documentation and Information Centre =

Former Spanish-based think tank

The European Documentation and Information Centre, abbreviated CEDI (French: Centre Européen de Documentation et d'Information), was a former think tank founded in 1952 on the occasion of an international congress held in Santander, Spain. The objective of the organization was to unite various European conservative and Christian Democratic political organizations which formed in several Western European states during postwar reconstruction, the emerging Cold War and the beginnings of what would later be called European integration. During the 1950s and the 1960s, the CEDI was an important contact pool for European politicians. During its early years the CEDI's ideology and program was dominated by its first president, Otto von Habsburg, son of the last emperor of Austria. It was dissolved in 1990 following the collapse of the Iron Curtain.

== Backgrounds ==
Francoist Spain made use of the CEDI to get in contact with high-ranking persons of the political, military, economic and cultural life from Western Europe and thus end its post-war international isolation. By preaching the necessity of cultural exchange and the religious unity of the occident, the CEDI aimed at a political, military and economic inclusion of Spain into the beginning process of European Integration.

== Organization and members ==
The annual congresses of the CEDI, which were nearly always held in Spain, brought together many office bearers and dignitaries of the conservative milieu. Besides the Spanish initiators – hereunder Franco's foreign minister Alberto Martín Artajo, the director of the Institute for Hispanic Culture Alfredo Sánchez Bella and José Ignacio Escobar Kirkpatrick Marqués de Valdeiglesias – there was a strong support for CEDI's activities in Germany, Austria and France. The expelled Austrian Heir Apparent Otto von Habsburg was the founding and, later on, honorary president of the organization. Germany was represented by high-ranking members of the Christian Democratic and Christian Social Union of Bavaria parties, as for example the ministers Hans-Joachim von Merkatz and Richard Jaeger. The French section of the Documentation Centre was led by the Count François de la Noë and Michel Habib-Deloncle.

Among the first British supporters were William Teeling, Sir Frederick Corfield MP and Sir John Rodgers MP, who even held CEDI's international presidency from 1965 to 1967. Over the years, the Austrian secretary general Georg von Gaupp-Berghausen turned more and more out to be the actual organizational and programmatic head of the Documentation Centre.

== Ambitions and ideology ==
Besides the proclaimed Catholic Christian heritage, the traditional connections of the European upper nobility, military contacts and common economic interests, it was above all a virulent anticommunism which was tying together the members of the Documentation Centre. The scientific lectures given at the annual meetings of the CEDI dealt with questions of principle concerning European Integration, the Cold War and other subjects of social and international relevance.

== National sections ==
Apart from Spain, Germany and France, national sections emerged in and Belgium and Austria, some years later also in Liechtenstein, Switzerland, Sweden and Portugal. In Britain, the conservative "March Club" fulfilled the tasks of a national section since the beginning of the 1960s. Among the most prominent members of this British section were apart from Teeling, Corfield and Rodgers, Peter Agnew and Geoffrey Rippon who both were to become international presidents of the CEDI later on. It seems quite likely that the contacts provided by the Documentation Centre played a not unimportant role in negotiating Britain's entry into the European Community, since Rippon was the head of the British government's delegation.

== Development ==
When the CEDI became a civil law association in 1957, its head office was officially moved to Munich, Madrid remaining nevertheless a central branch office of the organization. With General Charles de Gaulle returning to the political stage in 1958, his fellows transformed the CEDI into an international forum in order to diffuse their conceptions of European politics. The cooperation between French Gaullists and German Christian Democrats has also been prepared by CEDI's initiatives.

The Gaullist engagement weakening by the end of the 1960s, Spanish influence in the Documentation Centre increased again. CEDI evolved into an instrument of Spanish interests in Latin America, reached out for Africa and Asia, and finally turned toward the domain of development policies.

Nevertheless, the organization had transgressed the zenith of its diplomatic activities. The urgent necessity of recruiting new members was perceived, but the CEDI did not find any solution to solve these problems. The political transformation process in Spain by the middle of the 1970s deprived the CEDI of its last material and organizational basics.
