= Frederick Dixon-Hartland =

British politician

- Born: 1 May 1832; Charlton Kings, Gloucestershire, England
- Died: 15 November 1909 (aged 77); Glyndebourne, East Sussex, England

Sir Frederick Dixon Dixon-Hartland, 1st Baronet, DL, FRGS (1 May 1832 – 1909) was an antiquary, banker and a Conservative politician who sat in the House of Commons from 1881 to 1909.

== Life and work ==
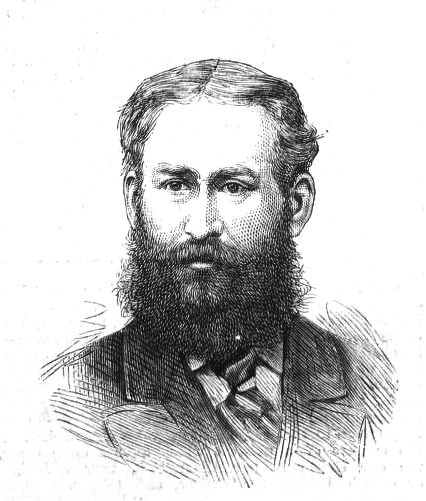
In 1881

Hartland was born in a small rural village, Charlton Kings, Gloucestershire, or close to Evesham, Worcestershire the son of Nathaniel Hartland and his wife Eliza Dixon of dissenting Christian sects, termed at the time nonconformists. He was educated at nearby Cheltenham College and in London at Clapham Grammar School.

Hartland was a traveller — he published Tapographia; or a collection of tombs of royal and distinguished families, collected during a tour of Europe. He was elected Fellow of the Society of Antiquaries and a Fellow of the Royal Geographical Society in 1854. He adopted the prefix of Dixon to his surname in 1861.

In 1875, he purchased land at Middleton-on-Sea and Felpham in Sussex in addition to his other home and agricultural holding at the time The Oaklands, Charlton Kings.

In business, he was a partner in Woodbridge Lace & Co and the Uxbridge Old Bank, a bank of a main historic market town in Middlesex for which town and its many nearby parishes he was MP – Middlesex centred on today's western and central London and for most purposes was abolished in 1965. In 1891, he sold the Smithfield Bank to Birmingham and Midland Bank

Dixon Hartland stood unsuccessfully at Hereford in 1880. He was elected as MP for Evesham the next year. He donated chancel gates and screens to St Mary's church also known as Cheltenham Minster at nearby Cheltenham. In 1885 he stood at Uxbridge with the same party and held the seat until his death in 1909. He was a Conservative.

Dixon Hartland was a County Alderman for Middlesex in 1889, a Deputy Lieutenant for the City of London, and a justice of the peace for Gloucestershire, Worcestershire and Middlesex. He was created a baronet on 3 October 1892.

Escutcheon of the Dixon-Hartland baronets of Middleton Manor

In 1895 he was appointed Chairman of the Thames Conservancy. Dixon-Hartland was the first president of Fulwell Golf club in 1904. He married his second wife, 28 years his junior, in 1895 Agnes Chichester Christie. His latter-life London home was at 14 Chesham Place, Belgravia/Knightsbridge, and he died on 15 November 1909 at Glyndebourne, East Sussex. His probate was resworn by his widow the next year at £176,584 (equivalent to about £18,000,000 in 2025).

Parliament of the United Kingdom
Preceded by Frederick Lehmann	Member of Parliament for Evesham; 1881–1885	Succeeded by Sir Richard Temple
New constituency	Member of Parliament for Uxbridge; 1885–1909	Succeeded by Charles Mills
Party political offices
Preceded by Sir Albert Rollit	Chairman of the National Union of Conservative and Constitutional Associations; 1890	Succeeded by Henry Byron Reed
Baronetage of the United Kingdom
New creation	Baronet (of Middleton Manor); 1892–1909	Extinct
Preceded by Carbutt baronets	Dixon-Hartland baronets of Middleton Manor; 3 October 1892	Succeeded by Lea baronets
