= Frederick Lehmann =

British businessman and politician (1826–1891)

(Augustus) Frederick Lehmann FRGS (1826 – 22 August 1891) was a British businessman and Liberal Party politician who sat in the House of Commons in 1880.

Born in Hamburg, the son of Leo Lehmann of Hamburg, he was the brother of Henri Lehmann and Rudolf Lehmann. Frederick Lehmann stood unsuccessfully for parliament at Middlesex in 1874 and Waterford in 1877. He was elected as the Member of Parliament (MP) for Evesham at a by-election in July 1880, by a majority of only two votes. A petition was lodged and the result voided. Scrutiny of the votes led to his opponent Frederick Dixon-Hartland being declared the winner in January 1881, with a majority of one vote.

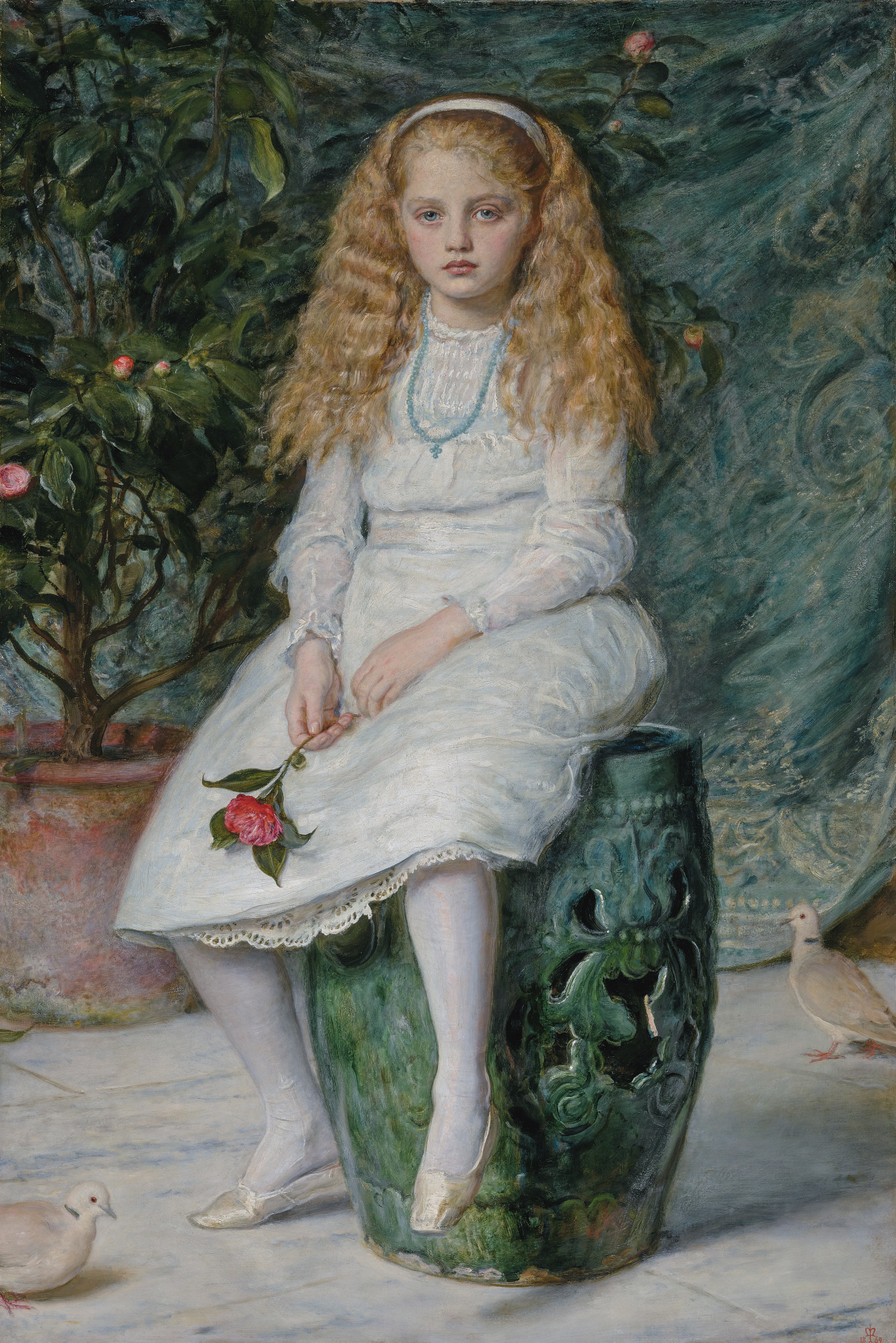
Nina, daughter of Frederick Lehmann (John Everett Millais, 1869)

Lehmann married Nina Chambers, daughter of Dr Robert Chambers of Edinburgh. Their social circle included Charles Dickens, George Eliot, Robert Browning, Lord Leighton, and other prominent figures. Their sons were Rudolf Chambers Lehmann (a Liberal politician), Frederick Hope Lehmann and Ernest Benzon Lehmann. They had one daughter, Nina, who married Sir Guy Theophilus Campbell, 3rd Baronet.

Parliament of the United Kingdom
Preceded by Daniel Rowlinson Ratcliff	Member of Parliament for Evesham; 1880 – 1881	Succeeded by Frederick Dixon-Hartland
