= Daniel Rowlinson Ratcliff =

Ratcliff in 1880

Daniel Rowlinson Ratcliff (2 October 1837 – 1923) was an English lock and safe manufacturer and a Liberal politician who sat in the House of Commons in 1880.

Ratcliff was born in Birmingham, the son of Joseph Ratcliff of Edgbaston, to a family of machinists and founders. He was a partner in the safe-making firm of Thomas Milner and Son. He was a J.P. for Worcestershire and Warwickshire.

At the 1880 general election Ratcliff was elected Member of Parliament for Evesham. His election was declared void in June 1880.

Ratcliff married Jane Milner, only daughter of Thomas Milner, in 1862, and was living at Mansion House, Great Alne, Warwickshire, with his wife and several children in 1881. In 1889 he established the company of Ratner Safe with his son William Milner Ratcliff and John Horner. He died at the age of 85 in 1923.

Parliament of the United Kingdom
Preceded by James Bourne	Member of Parliament for Evesham; April 1880 – July 1880	Succeeded by Frederick Lehmann
