= Peter Borthwick =

British politician and newspaper editor

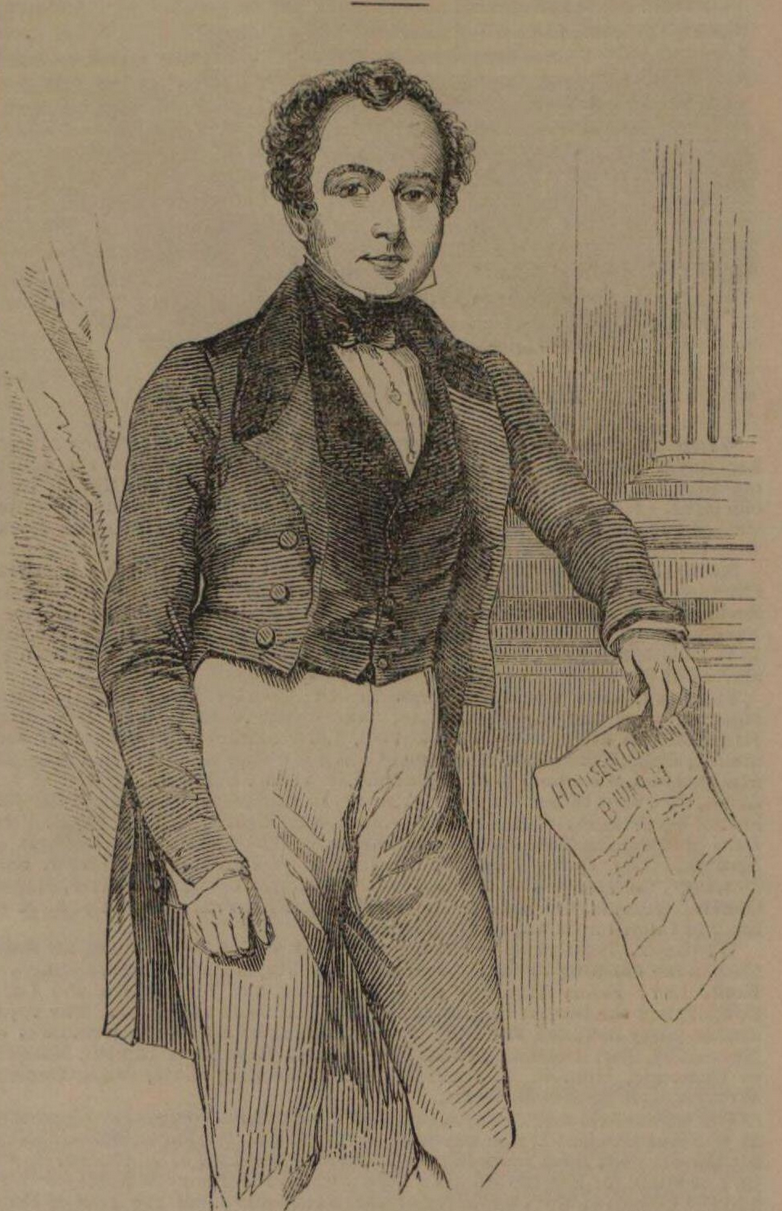

Member of Parliament for Evesham
- In office 1835–1838
- In office 1841–1847

Personal details
- Born: 13 September 1804 Borthwick, Midlothian, Scotland
- Died: 18 December 1852 (aged 48) London, England
- Resting place: Church of the Holy Trinity in Brompton
- Party: Conservative

Peter Borthwick (13 September 1804 – 18 December 1852) was a British Conservative politician and newspaper editor. He served as a member of the British Parliament for Evesham from 1835 to 1837, then again from 1841 to 1847.

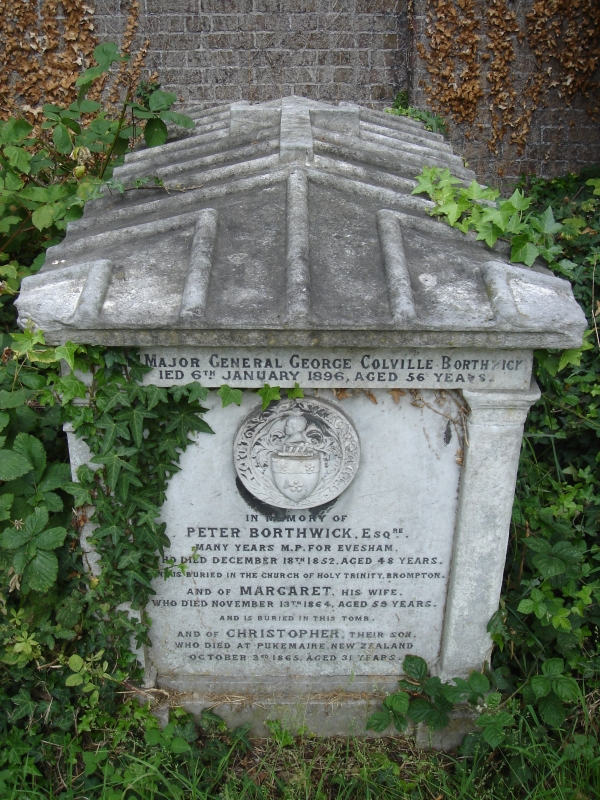
A funerary monument to Borthwick in Brompton Cemetery

== Early life ==
Peter Borthwick was born in Borthwick, Midlothian on 13 September 1804, the son of Thomas Borthwick. He was educated at school in Penicuik and at the University of Edinburgh, where he was the private pupil of the future Bishop of Edinburgh and Primus of the Scottish Episcopal Church, Professor James Walker. In 1828 he was admitted as a pensioner at Jesus College, Cambridge, whence he migrated to Downing College as a fellow-commoner two years later. He did not receive a degree.

== Political career ==
Borthwick first came to attention through his staunch opposition to the British abolitionist movement, which attracted the attention and thanks of various proslavery advocates and right-wing political associations. In 1833, he was appointed by the West India Committee to defend slavery in debates in Glasgow with English abolitionist George Thompson.

He was MP for Evesham from 1835 to 1837 and again from 1841 to 1847. In between, from 1837 to 1841, the MP for Evesham was Sir George Rushout (later Baron Northwick) of Northwick Park, Worcestershire. These two gentlemen fought one of the last duels in England on 8 May 1838 over the disputed election of 1837.

He was an outspoken defender of Don Carlos' Durango Decree, which excluded the British Auxiliary Legion from the terms of the Lord Eliot Convention, and also of British subjects who fought in the Carlist ranks.

== Publishing career ==
Borthwick was editor of The Morning Post from 1848 until his death in 1852. This paper was noted for its outspoken support of Lord Palmerston's foreign policy.

== Death and burial ==
Borthwick died on 18 December 1852 and is buried in the Church of the Holy Trinity in Brompton, but has a memorial on the tomb of his wife Margaret in Brompton Cemetery, London. The grave lies at the eastmost end of the main east–west path.

== Personal life ==
He married Margaret Colville, who died on 13 November 1864, aged 59 years.

Their son was Algernon Borthwick, 1st Baron Glenesk, who took over as editor of The Morning Post on the death of his father.

Parliament of the United Kingdom
Preceded by Thomas Hudson; Sir Charles Cockerell, Bt	Member of Parliament for Evesham; 1835 – 1838; With: Sir Charles Cockerell, Bt to 1837; George Rushout from 1837	Succeeded by Lord Marcus Hill; George Rushout
Preceded by George Rushout; Lord Marcus Hill	Member of Parliament for Evesham; 1841 – 1847; With: Lord Marcus Hill	Succeeded by Sir Henry Willoughby, Bt; Lord Marcus Hill
