= John Coventry (Royalist) =

English politician

John Coventry (died 1652) was an English politician who sat in the House of Commons from 1641 to 1642.

Coventry was the son of Thomas Coventry, 1st Baron Coventry by his second wife Elizabeth Aldersley, daughter of John Aldersley of Spurstow, Cheshire, and widow of William Pitchford. In 1641, he was elected Member of Parliament for Evesham in a by-election on 2 February after William Sandys was expelled from the House as a monopolist. He was disabled from sitting on 12 August 1642 for joining in the Commission of Array.

Coventry married Elizabeth Dodington, widow of Herbert Dodington and daughter of John Coles of Barton, Somerset. His son John was MP for Weymouth and Melcombe Regis whose assault in 1670, led to the passing of the "Coventry Act".

Parliament of England
Preceded by William Sandys; Richard Cresheld	Member of Parliament for Evesham; 1641–1642; With: Richard Cresheld	Succeeded by Richard Cresheld; Samuel Gardner
