= Bourne baronets =

Extinct baronetcy in the Baronetage of the United Kingdom

Escutcheon of the Bourne baronets of Hackinsall Hall and Heathfield

The Bourne Baronetcy, of Hackinsall Hall in the parish of Stalmine, and of Heathfield in the parish of Childwall, both in the County Palatine of Lancaster, was a title in the Baronetage of the United Kingdom. It was created on 10 May 1880 for the Conservative Party politician James Bourne.

The title became extinct on the death of his son, the 2nd Baronet, in 1883.

== Bourne baronets, of Hackinsall Hall and Heathfield (1880) ==
- Sir James Bourne, 1st Baronet (1812–1882)
- Sir James Dyson Bourne, 2nd Baronet (1842–1883)

== Extended family ==
Harriet Anne Dyson Bourne, daughter of the 1st Baronet, married in 1883 James William Seaburne May. In 1892 he assumed Bourne as additional surname, and took the arms of Bourne.

Baronetage of the United Kingdom
Preceded by Ripley baronets	Bourne baronets of Hackinsall Hall and Heathfield; 10 May 1880	Succeeded by Goldney baronets
