= Robert Bowyer (diarist) =

English politician and diarist (1560s–1621)

Robert Bowyer (c. 1560–1621) (Note: Various sources report other dates for Bowyer's death. Williams (1897) gives the year 1634. Hasler (1981) gives a date of 1622. Davidson, Oxford Dictionary of National Biography (2004) and Kyle (2010) both give the date as 1621; this is the date followed in this article.) was an English politician who sat in the House of Commons at various times between 1601 and 1610.

He served as Keeper of the Records in the Tower of London early in the reign of James I of England and was named to the office of Clerk of the Parliaments in 1610. He is notable for his Diary, which records much of the detailed proceedings of Parliament between 1605 and 1607.

He should not be confused with the Robert Bowyer who was granted the reversion of some minor Exchequer offices in 1604, (Note: Williams (1897) seems to have made this error.) or with his cousin Robert Bowyer (d. 1626) a London merchant whose memorial was in St Olave Jewry.

== Life and career ==
Bowyer was the second son of William Bowyer, Keeper of the Records in the Tower of London and his wife Agnes, daughter of Sir John Harcourt (d. 1566) of Oxfordshire and Staffordshire, the widow of John Knyvet of Ashwellthorpe, Norfolk. Robert had an elder brother William (who died young), a sister Judith, and an older half-brother Henry Knyvett.

His father died in 1569 or early 1570, and young Robert was placed with his uncle, Francis Bowyer, a wealthy alderman of London. He received his BA from Oxford in 1579 and continued his studies briefly at Clifford's Inn before entering the Middle Temple in 1580.

Bowyer attached himself to Thomas Sackville, Lord Buckhurst (later the Earl of Dorset). In 1594 and 1597 he pursued the position of Clerk of the Parliaments (that is, senior clerk of the House of Lords), without success. The role went to Thomas Smith, clerk of the Privy Council, who had written to the Queen's Secretary Robert Cecil "I think there is or will be one Bowyer, a suitor for the place by means of my Lord of Buckhurst, who may be well worthy, perhaps, of some other and greater preferment, but I may be bold to say (without any ill affection to the man), that he is not fit for this place, by reason of a great imperfection he hath in his speech." The role went to Smith, and Bowyer was given the reversion of the position (which he took up after Smith's death in December 1609).

In 1599 Buckhurst succeeded William Cecil as Lord Treasurer, and by that time Bowyer was in service as Buckhurst's secretary, a position he probably held until the Lord Treasurer's death in 1608. Under the Lord Treasurer's patronage Bowyer was elected Member of Parliament for Steyning in 1601. Near the end of his first term, it was recorded that he "swooned upon a sudden, and was again recovered within a quarter of an hour. It was said he had a spice of the falling sickness".

In 1604, he was appointed to his father's old position of Keeper of the Records in the Tower of London, jointly with his nephew-by-marriage Henry Elsynge. (Note: Henry Elsynge (bap. 1577–1635) married Bowyer's niece Blanche Highgate (or Hyett) in 1600. Elsynge's widowed mother Frances had married Bowyer's older half-brother Henry Knyvett in 1584.) On 31 October 1605 he was elected MP for Evesham in a by-election. "[A]s befitted his experience and office, Bowyer was often appointed to committees to search for precedents and to provide the House with official records." During this term he kept a diary of parliament and political activities, which has survived.

Like his father before him, Robert Bowyer was a collector of old manuscripts. He owned the Lindisfarne Gospels, which bear his signature on folio 2v (now visible only under ultraviolet light); their earlier provenance is obscure.

Thomas Smith died in December 1609, and Bowyer was sworn Clerk of the Parliaments on 30 January 1610, resigning his seat in Commons. He soon brought Elsynge on to assist him in the Lords. He and Elsynge continued to serve as joint Keepers of the Records in the Tower until 1612. Bowyer spent the remainder of his years organising and preserving the Parliamentary records which he had found in a sadly neglected state.

Bowyer died 15 March 1621 and was buried at St Dunstan-in-the-West on 16 March. He died unmarried, leaving his books and papers to Henry Elsynge who succeeded him as Clerk of the Parliaments. His will was proved 22 November 1622.

== Works ==
Bowyer's diary of his years in the Commons was published as The Parliamentary Diary of Robert Bowyer, 1606–1607, edited by David Harris Willson, University of Minnesota Press, 1931. It was reprinted by Ogden Press in 1971.

Bowyer and Elsynge's official notes as Clerks of the Parliaments were published as Notes of the Debates in the House of Lords Officially Taken by Robert Bowyer and Henry Elsing 1621, 1625, 1628, edited by Frances Helen Relf, Royal Historical Society, London, 1929.

== Notes ==
Parliament of England
Preceded by John Shurley; Thomas Shirley	Member of Parliament for Steyning; 1601; With: Sir Thomas Shirley	Succeeded by Sir Thomas Bishopp; Sir Thomas Shirley
Preceded by Sir Philip Knightley; Thomas Biggs	Member of Parliament for Evesham; 1605–1610; With: Thomas Biggs	Succeeded by Edward Salter; Thomas Biggs
