= Edward Atkyns (politician) =

English lawyer and politician

Sir Edward Atkyns (c. 1630 – October 1698) was an English lawyer and politician who sat in the House of Commons in 1660. He was the Chief Baron of the Exchequer from 1686 to 1689.

== Early life ==
Atkyns was the younger son of Sir Edward Atkyns of Hensington and Albury Hall, Hertfordshire and his first wife Ursula Dacres, daughter of Sir Thomas Dacres of Cheshunt, Hertfordshire. He was admitted at Sidney Sussex College, Cambridge in October 1646. He was admitted at Lincoln's Inn on 19 June 1647 and was called to the bar in 1653. In 1656 he became a J.P. for Woodstock and Hertfordshire.

== Career ==
In 1660, Atkyns was elected Member of Parliament for Woodstock in the Convention Parliament. He was commissioner for oyer and terminer for the London, Oxford and Midland circuits in July 1660 and commissioner for assessment for Oxfordshire from August 1660 to 1661. In November 1660 he was granted a 40-year monopoly in the publication of law books. He was commissioner for assessment for Hertfordshire from 1661 to 1680. He was recorder of Woodstock from 1661 to 1662. In 1669, he succeeded to the Albury estate on the death of his father.

In 1675, Atkyns was appointed autumn reader at his inn of court, and in Easter term 1679 was made a serjeant-at-law. Having secured some reputation for legal learning and for hospitality, he was raised to the bench as one of the Barons of the Exchequer on 22 June 1679. He was knighted on 26 June 1679. He took a prominent part in the trial of Fr Thomas Thwing and Mary Pressicks, who were charged on 29 July 1680, at the instigation of the anti-Catholic agitators of the day, with compassing the death of King Charles II and seeking the overthrow of the Protestant religion. On his summing up, Atkyns placed the case before the jury with becoming impartiality, and Mrs. Pressicks was acquitted, although Fr Thwing was found guilty. At the close of the same year, he was one of the judges appointed to try William Howard, 1st Viscount Stafford and other Roman Catholic peers on a charge of high treason, but he there supported his colleagues in their contention that the law, which demanded two witnesses to every overt act of treason, might on occasion be waived.

On 21 April 1686, when Lord Chief Baron Montagu was removed from the bench for refusing to certify to the legality of the dispensing power exercised by James II, Atkyns was promoted to his place. After the Revolution of 1688, he consistently refused to take the oaths of allegiance to William III, and consequently resigned his office. His elder brother Sir Robert Atkyns was immediately appointed in his place. Shortly afterwards, Atkyns retired from public life, and withdrew to his country seat at South Pickenham, Norfolk. Although he continued to hold Jacobite opinions, he showed no bitterness of spirit to those who differed from him, and earned the gratitude of all classes of his neighbours by his tact in settling their disputes.

== Personal life ==
Atkyns married Elizabeth Lucy, daughter of Francis Lucy of the Strand, Westminster on 9 December 1656. He had two sons and seven daughters.

Atkyns died in London at the age of about 68 as a result of a kidney stone.

Legal offices
Preceded by William Montagu	Lord Chief Baron of the Exchequer; 1686–1689	Succeeded by Robert Atkyns
