= Charlotte Atkyns =

British actress and spy (1757–1836)

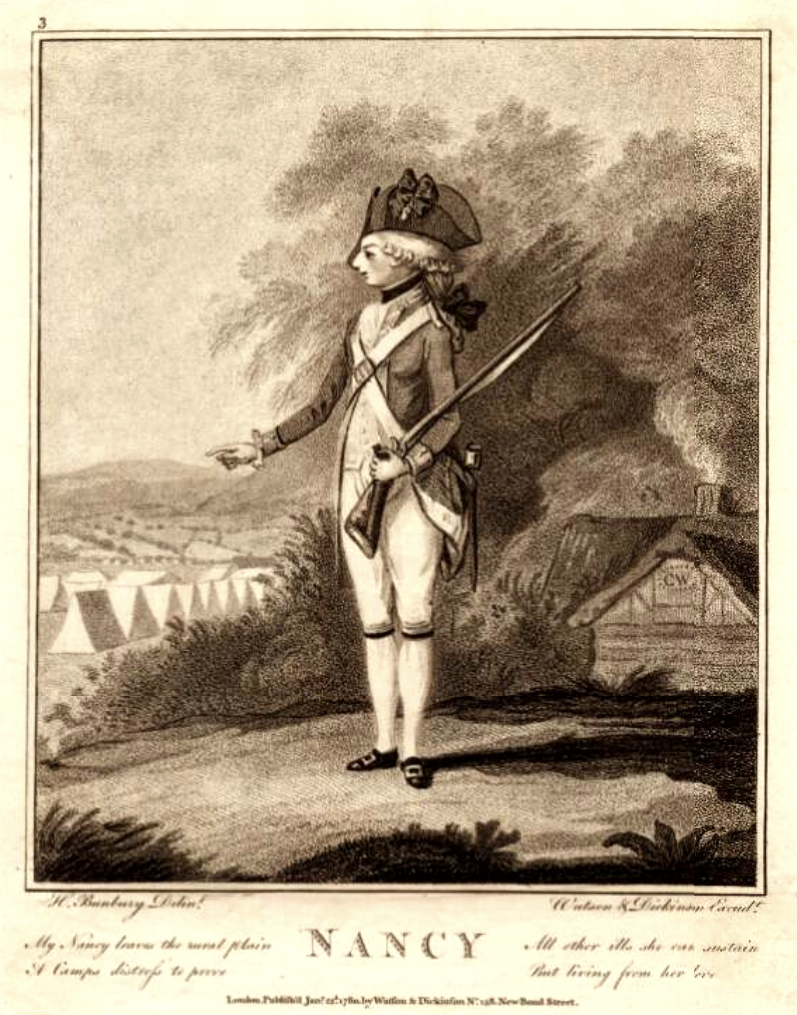

Personal information
- Birth name: Walpole
- Born: 1757
- Died: 1836 (aged 78–79)
- Occupation(s): Actor and English agent
- Years active: 1777–1779
- Spouse: Edwards Atkyns

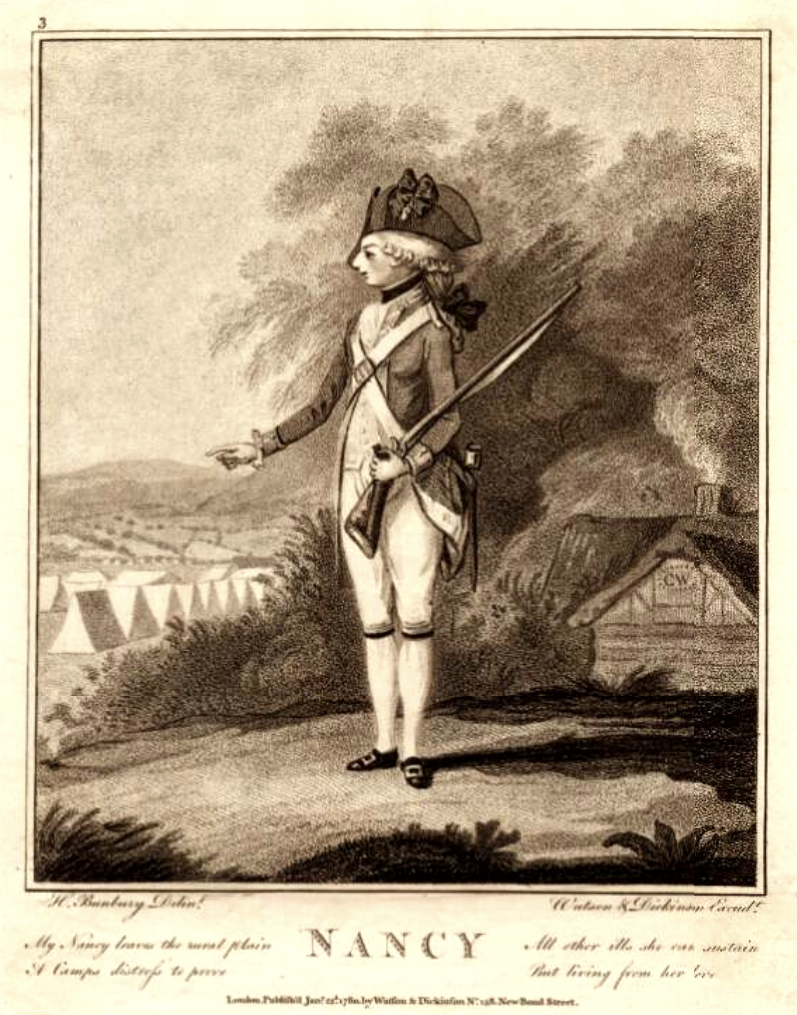
Charlotte Walpole in character as Nancy, in The Camp, 1778

Charlotte Atkyns (née Walpole) (1757–1836) was an English actress and agent, foremost known for her attempts in rescuing the members of the former royal family of France from imprisonment during the French Revolution.

== Life ==
She enjoyed a short career on the London stage as Charlotte Walpole in 1777–1779. She married in 1779 Edward Atkyns (1756–1794) of Ketteringham Hall, Norfolk. They moved to France by 1784.

After the outbreak of the French revolution, she was recruited as a spy and agent for the counterrevolutionary royalists by Louis de Frotté. Between 1791 and 1794, she was active as a spy in Paris. She became known for her attempts of trying to aid the members of the former royal family to escape from prison. In 1793, she made repeated attempts to try to help former queen Marie Antoinette on one occasion by visiting her in prison dressed as a national guard with the plan of changing clothes with her. She also tried to free the former royal children from the Temple.

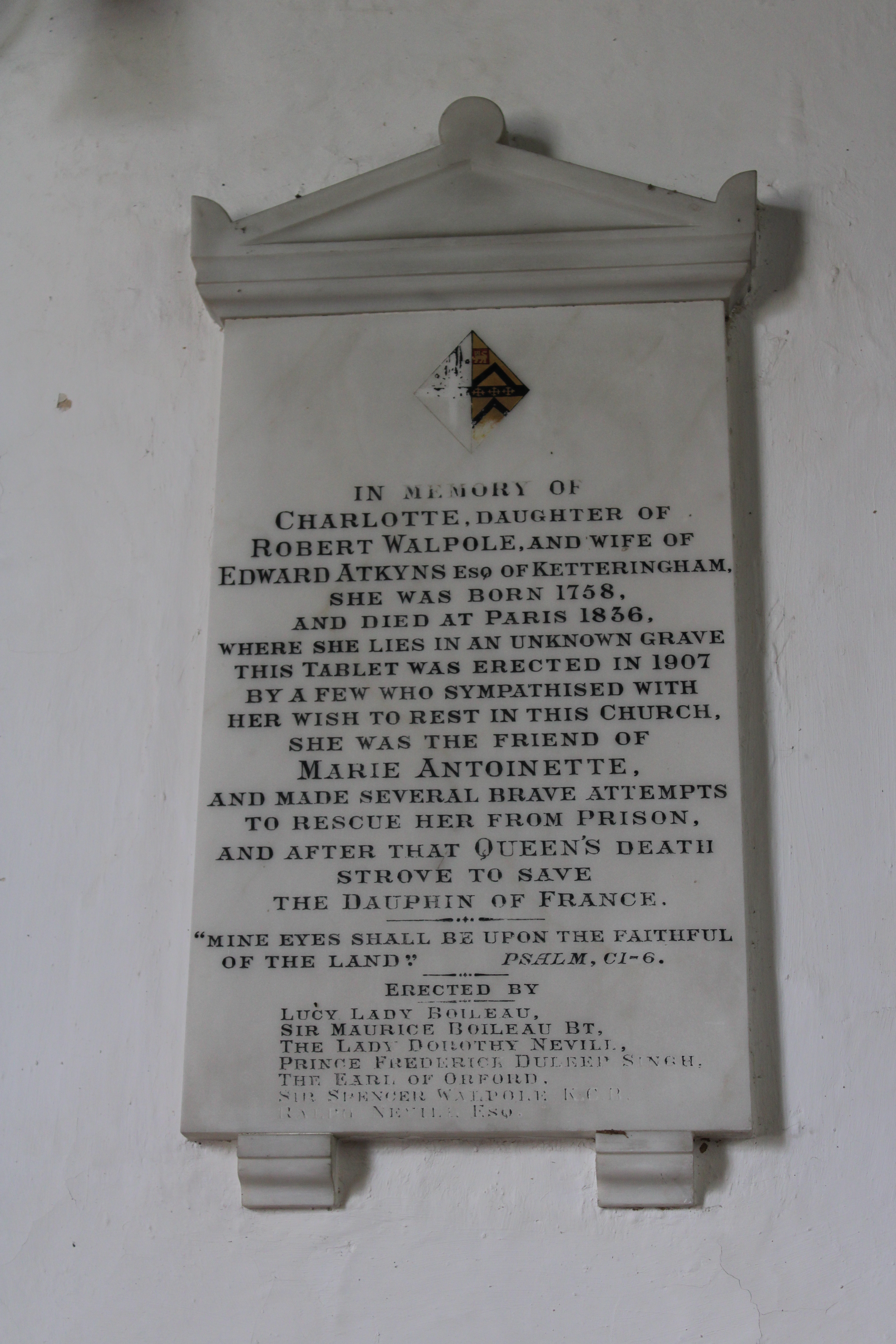
Commemorative plaque to Charlotte Atkyns in Ketteringham church
