= John Egioke =

Member of the Parliament of England

John Egioke (c 1616 - 22 December 1663) was an English politician who sat in the House of Commons in 1660.

Egioke was the eldest son of Sir Francis Egioke of Shernock Court. He was at Lincoln's Inn in 1635. In 1645 he was added to the Parliamentary Committee of Worcestershire and was appointed an assessment commissioner in 1656.

In 1660, Egioke was elected Member of Parliament for Evesham in the Convention Parliament. On 10 July 1660 he was appointed J.P for Worcestershire.

Egioke married Mary Draper, widow of William Draper and daughter of Richard Cresheld.
