= Edward Atkyns (judge) =

English judge

Sir Edward Atkyns SL (1587–1669) was an English judge, a baron of the exchequer of the Commonwealth period.

== Life ==
He was the third son of Richard Atkyns, and was born in 1587, apparently at Bensington in Oxfordshire. Admitted on 5 February 1601 as a student of Lincoln's Inn, where his father and grandfather had both attained legal honours, he was called to the bar 25 January 1614, became governor of the society in 1630, and was two years later nominated Autumn Reader.

On 7 February 1633 Atkyns appeared before the Star Chamber as counsel for William Prynne, charged with libelling the queen Henrietta Maria in his Histriomastix, and defended his client's character from his personal acquaintance with him. He may have given similar help to Henry Burton and John Bastwick when brought before the same tribunal in 1637; in 1640 Burton and Bastwick, while petitioning the Long Parliament to reconsider their sentence of imprisonment, requested permission to obtain Atkyns's legal assistance in stating their case.

Atkyns was promoted to a serjeanty by the king on 19 May 1640 (a fortnight after the dissolution of the Short Parliament). Atkyns accepted the honour, and made no change in his pro-Parliament conduct. But a royal patent, issued on 7 October 1640, appointing Atkyns a Baron of the Exchequer, did not take effect. In 1643, when the House of Commons entered into negotiations with Charles I, they demanded that ‘Mr. Serjeant Atkyns should be made justice of the King's Bench’, and on 28 October 1645, despairing of any settlement with the crown, they created him, by their own order, baron of the exchequer. This post Atkyns held till 4 August 1648, when, by an order of the Lords, he was removed to the Court of Common Pleas. Around 1650, he bought the manor of Hensington from Edward Shiere, but sold it on to Lewis Napier in 1661.

After the king's death, Atkyns, according to Foss, refused to accept a commission from the provisional council of state continuing him in his office, but on 9 December 1650 he was nominated, without protest on his part, one of the judges to try disturbers of the peace in the eastern counties, and was consulted by Oliver Cromwell on legal business. On 16 January 1654, he delivered before the protector and his council the opinion of the judges stating the liability of an alien, Don Pantaleone, the brother of the Portuguese ambassador, to be tried in an English court of law on a charge of murder alleged to have been committed during a riot in the New Exchange, London, and at Pantaleone's trial Atkyns was one of the presiding judges. The only instance in which Atkyns openly refused to act with the Commonwealth authorities was in June 1654 at the trial, by special commission, of John Gerard and others for conspiracy to murder Cromwell. An ordinance of the council had in the previous January brought the crime within the legal definition of treason, and before the trial commenced, Atkyns, with the other judges, was requested to bind himself by oath to give the ordinance effect. But this he declined to do: ‘By the law,’ he said, ‘no man indicted for treason but ought to be tried by a jury; by this ordinance it is otherwise; and therefore this oath [seems] contrary to the other oaths I have taken.’

This episode did not affect Atkyns's position. He was renominated a judge on the first return of the Long Parliament to Westminster in May 1659, but on its second return in the following year his name was omitted from the list of duly appointed judges. After the Restoration, in May 1660, Atkyns, however, was created anew (23 June) a baron of the exchequer and knighted. On 9 October following, he was one of the presiding judges at the trial of the regicides, but took no prominent part in the proceedings. On 9 March 1661 he fell seriously ill on the Midland circuit; on 20 April 1661 he arranged, with others, the procedure to be followed at the trial of Lord Morley for murder; and on 1 April 1668 he took part in an important trial of certain rioters charged with high treason. He died 9 October 1669, at Albury Hall, Hertfordshire, an estate that he had purchased in 1661.

== Family ==
Atkyns married (1) Ursula, daughter of Sir Thomas Dacres, by whom he had two sons, Robert and Edward, who both became judges of eminence, and three daughters; and (2) Frances, daughter of John Berry, of Lydd, Kent, by whom he had no issue. His first wife died 26 June 1644, and was buried in Cheshunt Church, Hertfordshire. His second wife, whom Atkyns married 16 September 1645, long survived him, and died 2 March 1704, at the reputed age of 100.
