= Sir Thomas Biggs, 1st Baronet =

English politician

Biggs baronets of Lenchwick
- Escutcheon of the Biggs baronets
- Creation date: 1620
- Status: extinct
- Extinction date: 1621

Sir Thomas Biggs, 1st Baronet (c. 1577 – 11 June 1621), was an English politician.

Biggs was the son of Sir Thomas Biggs, of Lenchwick, Worcestershire, by Ursula Throckmorton, daughter of Clement Throckmorton, of Haseley, Warwickshire. He was educated at Queen's College, Oxford.

He represented Evesham in Parliament in 1614 and again in 1621. In 1620 he was created a baronet, of Lenchwick in the County of Worcester. He sold the family estates at Lenchwick and Norton to Lord Craven.

Bigg married Anne Witham, daughter of William Witham, of Leadstone (Ledston), Yorkshire. They had no children. He died in June 1621 when the baronetcy became extinct. Lady Bigg married as her second husband Sir John Walter.

Parliament of England
Preceded by Thomas Biggs; Edward Salter	Member of Parliament for Evesham; 1614–1622; With: Anthony Langston	Succeeded by Sir Edward Conway; Richard Cresheld
Baronetage of England
New creation	Baronet (of Lenchwick); 1620–1621	Extinct
