= South Worcestershire =

Parliamentary constituency in the United Kingdom, 1950–1997

- Former county constituency for the House of Commons
- County: Worcestershire

1950–1997
- Seats: One
- Created from: Evesham and Bewdley
- Replaced by: West Worcestershire, Mid Worcestershire

South Worcestershire was a parliamentary constituency which returned one Member of Parliament (MP) to the House of Commons of the Parliament of the United Kingdom, elected by the first past the post voting system.

The constituency was created for the 1950 general election, and abolished for the 1997 general election.

== Boundaries ==
1950–1974: The Municipal Borough of Evesham, the Urban District of Malvern, and the Rural Districts of Evesham, Pershore, and Upton-on-Severn.

1974–1983: As prior but with redrawn boundaries.

1983–1997: The District of Wychavon wards of Badsey, Bredon, Bretforton and Offenham, Broadway, Eckington, Elmley Castle, Evesham East, Evesham Hampton, Evesham North, Evesham South, Evesham West, Fladbury, Harvington and Norton, Honeybourne and Pebworth, Pershore Holy Cross, Pershore St Andrew's, Somerville, South Bredon Hill, The Littletons, and Wickhamford, and the District of Malvern Hills wards of Chase, Kempsey, Langland, Link, Longdon, Morton, Powyke, Priory, Ripple, The Hanleys, Trinity, Upton-on-Severn, Wells, and West.

The main settlements in the seat were Great Malvern, Pershore, and the market town of Evesham. At the 1997 general election, Great Malvern and Pershore were transferred to the new seat of West Worcestershire and Evesham was transferred to the redrawn seat of Mid Worcestershire.

== Members of Parliament ==
| Election | Member | Party | Notes |
|---|---|---|---|
| 1950 | Rupert de la Bere | Conservative | Previously MP for Evesham from 1935 |
| 1955 | Peter Agnew | Conservative | |
| 1966 | Gerald Nabarro | Conservative | Died November 1973; no by-election held |
| Feb 1974 | Michael Spicer | Conservative | Subsequently, MP for West Worcestershire |
| 1997 | constituency abolished: see Mid Worcestershire & West Worcestershire | | |

== Election results ==
=== Elections in the 1950s ===
1950 general election: South Worcestershire
| Party | Candidate | Votes | % | ±% |
|---|---|---|---|---|
| Conservative | Rupert de la Bère | 26,948 | 63.23 | |
| Labour | Patrick Tennyson-Hopwood | 15,668 | 36.77 | |
| Majority | | 11,280 | 26.46 | |
| Turnout | | 42,616 | 80.18 | |
| Registered electors | | 53,148 | | |
| Conservative win (new seat) | | | | |

1951 general election: South Worcestershire
| Party | Candidate | Votes | % | ±% |
|---|---|---|---|---|
| Conservative | Rupert de la Bère | 27,229 | 65.36 | +2.13 |
| Labour | Patrick Tennyson-Hopwood | 14,434 | 34.64 | −2.13 |
| Majority | | 12,795 | 30.72 | +4.26 |
| Turnout | | 41,663 | 75.91 | −4.27 |
| Registered electors | | 54,883 | | |
| Conservative hold | | Swing | +2.13 | |

1955 general election: South Worcestershire
| Party | Candidate | Votes | % | ±% |
|---|---|---|---|---|
| Conservative | Peter Agnew | 26,811 | 65.97 | +0.61 |
| Labour | Eric LJ Thorne | 13,831 | 34.03 | −0.61 |
| Majority | | 12,980 | 31.94 | +1.22 |
| Turnout | | 40,642 | 72.93 | −2.98 |
| Registered electors | | 55,730 | | |
| Conservative hold | | Swing | +0.61 | |

1959 general election: South Worcestershire
| Party | Candidate | Votes | % | ±% |
|---|---|---|---|---|
| Conservative | Peter Agnew | 25,824 | 59.23 | −6.74 |
| Labour | David Young | 10,884 | 24.96 | −9.07 |
| Liberal | Emrys Hillary L Harries | 6,890 | 15.80 | New |
| Majority | | 14,940 | 34.27 | +2.33 |
| Turnout | | 43,598 | 75.62 | +2.59 |
| Registered electors | | 57,657 | | |
| Conservative hold | | Swing | −6.74 | |

=== Elections in the 1960s ===
1964 general election: South Worcestershire
| Party | Candidate | Votes | % | ±% |
|---|---|---|---|---|
| Conservative | Peter Agnew | 23,740 | 51.19 | −8.04 |
| Liberal | Anthony Batchelor | 11,503 | 24.80 | +9.00 |
| Labour | Stephen Drewer | 11,137 | 24.01 | −0.95 |
| Majority | | 12,237 | 26.39 | −7.88 |
| Turnout | | 46,380 | 77.26 | +1.64 |
| Registered electors | | 60,030 | | |
| Conservative hold | | Swing | −8.52 | |

1966 general election: South Worcestershire
| Party | Candidate | Votes | % | ±% |
|---|---|---|---|---|
| Conservative | Gerald Nabarro | 24,198 | 51.72 | +0.53 |
| Labour | Kenneth A Gulleford | 13,114 | 28.03 | +4.02 |
| Liberal | Robin G Otter | 9,476 | 20.25 | −4.55 |
| Majority | | 11,084 | 23.69 | −2.70 |
| Turnout | | 46,788 | 75.56 | −1.75 |
| Registered electors | | 61,918 | | |
| Conservative hold | | Swing | −8.52 | |

=== Elections in the 1970s ===
1970 general election: South Worcestershire
| Party | Candidate | Votes | % | ±% |
|---|---|---|---|---|
| Conservative | Gerald Nabarro | 30,648 | 60.4 | +8.7 |
| Labour | Adrian Bailey | 12,839 | 25.3 | −2.7 |
| Liberal | John Hall | 7,262 | 14.3 | −5.9 |
| Majority | | 17,809 | 35.1 | +11.4 |
| Turnout | | 50,749 | 72.1 | −3.47 |
| Registered electors | | 70,395 | | |
| Conservative hold | | Swing | +5.70 | |

February 1974 general election: South Worcestershire
| Party | Candidate | Votes | % | ±% |
|---|---|---|---|---|
| Conservative | Michael Spicer | 28,126 | 47.12 | −13.27 |
| Liberal | John Percy Birch | 20,961 | 35.11 | +20.80 |
| Labour | David Philip Pugsley | 9,757 | 16.35 | −8.95 |
| Ind. Conservative | Geoffrey Hunt | 850 | 1.42 | New |
| Majority | | 7,165 | 11.99 | −23.10 |
| Turnout | | 59,694 | 81.77 | +9.68 |
| Registered electors | | 72,998 | | |
| Conservative hold | | Swing | −14.19 | |

October 1974 general election: South Worcestershire
| Party | Candidate | Votes | % | ±% |
|---|---|---|---|---|
| Conservative | Michael Spicer | 26,790 | 48.39 | +1.27 |
| Liberal | John Percy Birch | 17,739 | 32.04 | −3.08 |
| Labour | Stuart Randall | 10,838 | 19.58 | +3.23 |
| Majority | | 9,052 | 16.35 | +4.35 |
| Turnout | | 55,366 | 75.15 | −6.62 |
| Registered electors | | 73,674 | | |
| Conservative hold | | Swing | +2.18 | |

1979 general election: South Worcestershire
| Party | Candidate | Votes | % | ±% |
|---|---|---|---|---|
| Conservative | Michael Spicer | 34,926 | 57.14 | +8.75 |
| Liberal | Ivor David Philips | 14,272 | 23.35 | −8.69 |
| Labour | Gareth Daniel | 10,206 | 16.70 | −2.88 |
| Ecology | Guy Woodford | 1,722 | 2.72 | New |
| Majority | | 20,654 | 33.79 | +17.24 |
| Turnout | | 61,126 | 77.34 | +2.19 |
| Registered electors | | 79,036 | | |
| Conservative hold | | Swing | +8.72 | |

=== Elections in the 1980s ===
1983 general election: South Worcestershire
| Party | Candidate | Votes | % | ±% |
|---|---|---|---|---|
| Conservative | Michael Spicer | 30,095 | 55.77 | −1.37 |
| Liberal | Ivor Philips | 18,706 | 34.66 | +11.32 |
| Labour | Peter Sandland-Nielson | 4,183 | 7.75 | −8.95 |
| Ecology | Guy Woodford | 866 | 1.60 | −1.12 |
| Independent | Graham Pass | 113 | 0.21 | New |
| Majority | | 11,389 | 21.11 | −12.68 |
| Turnout | | 53,963 | 73.64 | −3.70 |
| Registered electors | | 73,278 | | |
| Conservative hold | | Swing | −6.35 | |

1987 general election: South Worcestershire
| Party | Candidate | Votes | % | ±% |
|---|---|---|---|---|
| Conservative | Michael Spicer | 32,277 | 55.30 | −0.47 |
| Liberal | Paul Chandler | 18,632 | 31.92 | −2.75 |
| Labour | Robert Garnett | 6,374 | 10.92 | +3.17 |
| Green | Guy Woodford | 1,089 | 1.87 | +0.26 |
| Majority | | 13,645 | 23.38 | +2.27 |
| Turnout | | 58,372 | 75.58 | +1.94 |
| Registered electors | | 77,237 | | |
| Conservative hold | | Swing | +1.14 | |

=== Elections in the 1990s ===
1992 general election: South Worcestershire
| Party | Candidate | Votes | % | ±% |
|---|---|---|---|---|
| Conservative | Michael Spicer | 34,792 | 54.1 | −1.2 |
| Liberal Democrats | Paul Chandler | 18,641 | 29.0 | −3.0 |
| Labour | Nigel Knowles | 9,727 | 15.1 | +4.2 |
| Green | Guy Woodford | 1,178 | 1.8 | −0.0 |
| Majority | | 16,151 | 25.1 | +1.7 |
| Turnout | | 64,338 | 80.3 | +4.7 |
| Registered electors | | 80,157 | | |
| Conservative hold | | Swing | +0.9 | |
