= Thomas Biggs (politician, died 1613) =

English politician (c. 1542–1613)

Sir Thomas Biggs (c. 1542 – 4 May 1613) was an English politician who sat in the House of Commons from 1604.

Biggs was the son of Thomas Biggs and his wife Magdalene Hoby. He built a mansion at Lenchwick. In 1593 he was High Sheriff of Worcestershire. He became a J.P. in 1601. He was knighted on 23 July 1603. In 1604, he was appointed an alderman of Evesham by the charter on 2 March 1604 and was elected Member of Parliament for Evesham and sat until 1611. He was re-appointed on 3 April 1605.

Biggs died at the age of about 70 and was buried in Abbot's Norton Church.

Biggs married Ursula Throckmorton, daughter of Clement Throckmorton of Haseley Warwickshire. His son Thomas became a baronet.

Parliament of England
| Preceded by Franchise in abbeyance | Member of Parliament for Evesham; 1604; With: Sir Philip Knightley; Robert Bowyer; Edward Salter | Succeeded by Sir Thomas Biggs, 1st Baronet; Anthony Langston |
