= Robert Atkyns (judge) =

Sir Robert Atkyns
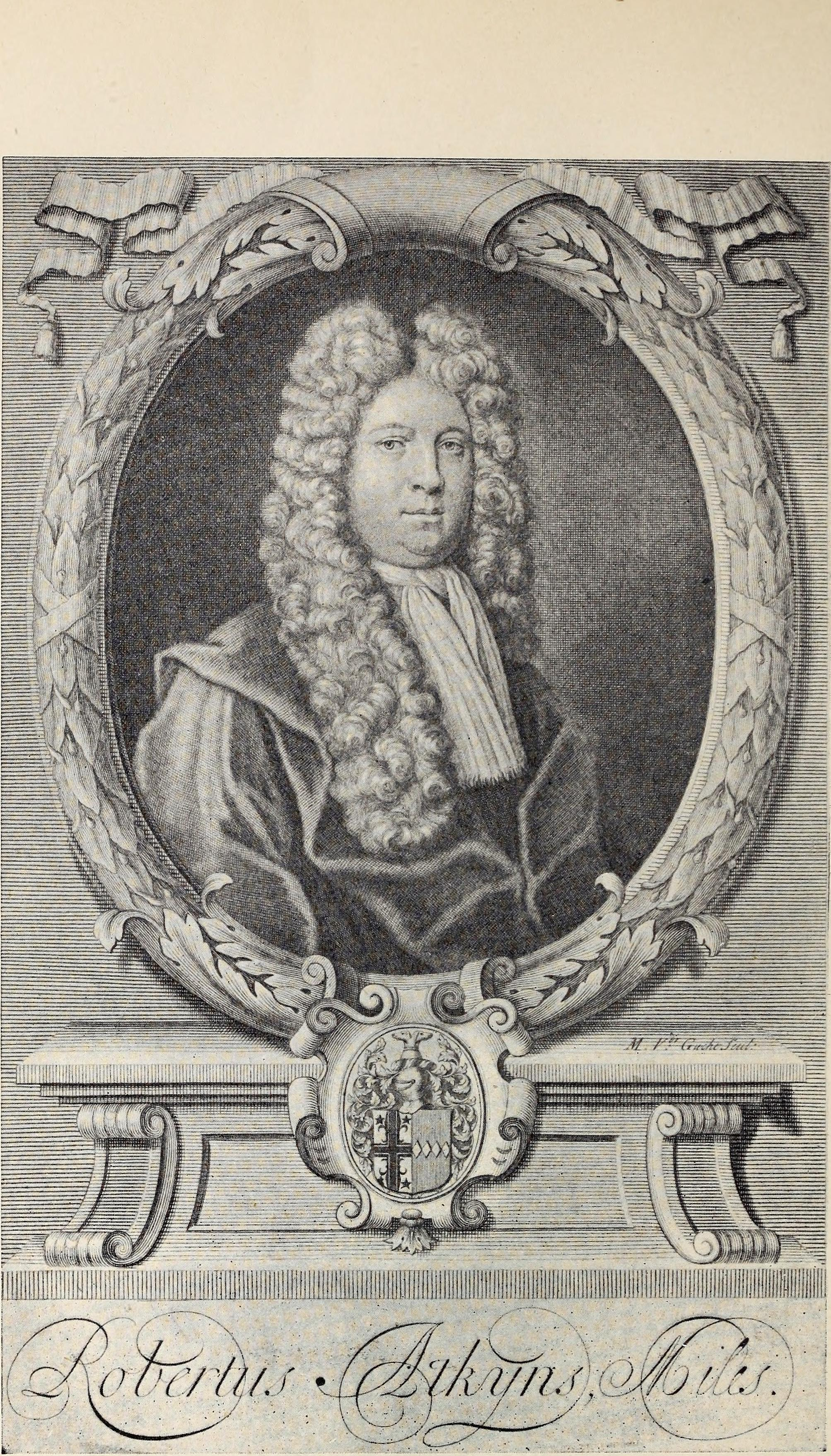
- Born: 1620
- Died: 18 February 1710 (aged 89); Sapperton, Gloucestershire
- Buried: Sapperton Church
- Wife: Mary Clarke; Anne Dacres
- Issue: Robert; Anne
- Father: Sir Edward Atkyns
- Occupation: barrister, MP and Judge
- Memorials: Sapperton Church, Gloucestershire

Sir Robert Atkyns (1620–1710) was an English Lord Chief Baron of the Exchequer, Member of parliament, and Speaker of the House of Lords.

== Early life ==
He was the eldest son of Sir Edward Atkyns, one of the Barons of the Exchequer during the Commonwealth, and the elder brother of Sir Edward Atkyns, who preceded him as Lord Chief Baron. There had been lawyers in the family for many generations: "He himself, and his three immediate ancestors, having been of the profession for near two hundred years, and in judicial places; and (through the blessing of Almighty God) have prospered by it." In The History of Gloucestershire written by his son Sir Robert Atkyns the record of the family is carried still further back, in an unbroken legal line, to a Richard Atkyns who lived at the beginning of the fifteenth century, and "followed the profession of the law in Monmouthshire". Robert Atkyns was born in Gloucestershire in 1620. It is not certain whether he went to Oxford or to Cambridge, Alexander Chalmers including him among the famous men of Balliol College, and George Dyer among those of Sidney Sussex College. Chalmers's statement may have originated in the fact that in 1663 Atkyns received from Oxford the degree of master of arts. In 1638 he was admitted to Lincoln's Inn, and was called to the bar in 1645. Mention of his name is made in some reported cases.

== Parliamentary and judicial career ==
In 1659, he entered Richard Cromwell's parliament as member for Evesham. Probably he was already known to sympathise with the king's party, for he was among the sixty-eight who were made knights of the Bath at Charles's coronation. His name does not appear in the list of members of Charles's first parliament, but in that of 1661, he sat for East Looe, speaking frequently upon legal questions, and, as appears from the record of the debates, with acknowledged authority. In 1661 he was made a bencher of his inn and a King's Serjeant, and about the same time was appointed recorder of Bristol. He served as one of the fire judges after the 1666 Great Fire of London. On the death of Sir Thomas Tyrrell in 1672 he became a judge of the court of Common Pleas.

Along with Sir William Scroggs, he was a judge in some of the trials arising from the Popish Plot, but there is little trace of the part which he took. According to Roger North, who was an eyewitness to the Plot trials, Scroggs entirely dominated the proceedings: the other judges, in his view "were passive and meddled little". Atkyns shared in the opinion that papists should be sternly dealt with; yet, to judge from his writings and his later life, it is inconceivable that he could have shared in the passion of the time. The chief civil case in which Atkyns took part during this period was that brought by Sir Samuel Barnardiston against Sir William Soame, the High Sheriff of Suffolk, which led ultimately to the passing of the act 7 & 8 Wm. III, c. 7, declaring it illegal for a sheriff to make a double return in the election of members of parliament. The points of the case are technical, but it excited keen political interest, and Atkyns's judgment, in which he differed from the majority of the court, marks the beginning of his separation from the party in power (reprinted in his Tracts, and in 6 St. Tr. 1074). In 1679 he retired from the bench in circumstances which lead one to believe that he was practically dismissed. Being questioned before a committee of the House of Commons in 1689, he mentioned several causes for his enforced retirement.

His judgment in Barnardiston v. Soame had given offence; he had declared against pensions to parliament men; he had quarrelled with Scroggs about the right to petition; and he had offended North by speaking against the sale of offices. "As to pensions, Lord Clifford took occasion to tell me 'that I had attended diligently in parliament, and was taken from my profession, therefore the king had thought fit to send me £500' I replied: 'I thank you. I will not accept anything for my attendance in parliament.' ... I did take occasion upon this to advise my countrymen 'that those who took pensions were not fit to be sent up to parliament again'". In fact, Atkyns was marked out as a disaffected man. He settled in Gloucestershire, with the intention of abandoning the law, but his political opinions again brought him into trouble. When the Oxford Parliament was summoned, he was persuaded, though unwillingly, to stand for Bristol, but was defeated by Sir Richard Hart and Thomas Earle, both Tories. A strong party in the city, not content with his defeat, sought to force him to resign the recordership. The occasion was found in an illegality of which Atkyns along with others was said to be guilty in proceeding to the election of an alderman in the absence of the mayor, who was the same Sir R. Hart. The prosecution failed, but "Sir Robert Atkyns, on the Lord Pemberton's and his brother's persuasion, resigned his recordership; which was all that the city of Bristol aimed at by their indictment". In the following year came the trial of Lord Russell; he could not appear by counsel, but his friends exerted themselves in the preparation of his defence, and applied to Atkyns, who wrote to them a statement of the law. "And the like assistance being afterwards desired from me, by many more persons of the best quality, who soon after fell into the same danger, I, living at some distance from London, did venture by letters, to find the best rules and directions I could, towards the making of their just defence, being heartily concerned with them". Five years afterwards he published the letters, together with A Defence of the late Lord Russel's Innocency, a spirited and eloquent reply to an anonymous pamphlet called An Antidote against Poyson. To a rejoinder from the same pen, The Magistracy and Government of England vindicated, he wrote in answer The Lord Russel's Innocency further defended, assailing his opponent with abuse and almost expressly naming him as Sir Bartholomew Shower. In point of legal criticism, Atkyns's letters and pamphlets are effective and still worth reading, but they do not shake the received opinion that the law of treason was not strained against Lord Russell. In 1684 we find his name associated with another great case, when Sir William Williams, the speaker of the House of Commons, was indicted for printing and publishing Dangerfield's narrative of the Popish Plot. Williams had acted under the orders of the House, so that the case raised the whole question of the powers and privileges of Parliament. Atkyns's argument in his defence is an elaborate review of the authorities, to show that the actions of Parliament, itself the highest court of the nation, were beyond the jurisdiction of inferior courts. Judgment was given against Williams, but in later cases, the decision has been described as disgraceful. The report in the State Trials says that Atkyns took part in the case, and even notices that he had to borrow a wig for the purpose; but in the other reports there is no mention of his name as counsel.

His steady attitude of resistance during these years of misgovernment met with recognition at the Revolution. In 1689 he succeeded his brother as chief baron, and in October of the same year, the great seal being in commission, he was appointed speaker of the House of Lords in the place of the Marquis of Halifax. He held the speakership until 1693, and for his services was recommended by the House to the king's favour. Towards the end of the following year he retired from the bench – through disappointment, it has been said, at not being chosen Master of the Rolls, but more likely owing to advancing age. Yet he still gave proof of continued vigour. In a pamphlet published in 1695, and "humbly submitted to the consideration of the House of Lords, to whom it belongeth to keep the inferior courts within their bounds," he renewed Edward Coke's protest against the insidious encroachments of the court of Chancery, tracing the growth of equitable jurisdiction, and suggesting how the common law might be restored. This was followed a few years afterwards by another tract, addressed as a petition to the House of Commons, in which, while repeating his complaint against the court of Chancery, and lamenting the uncertainty of the law, he argued from the history of Parliament that the exercise of judicial functions by the Lords was a usurpation. It should be read along with Skinner's case, in which the Lords failed in their attempt to exercise original jurisdiction, and Dr. Shirley's case, in which they maintained their right to an appellate jurisdiction. Atkyns had himself, while in parliament, taken a vigorous part in this struggle. After 1699 we hear nothing more of him till his death. He spent his later years at Sapperton Hall in Gloucestershire, and died on 18 February 1710, at age 89. Lord Campbell calls him a "virtuous judge," in what was an age of judicial scandals.

== Family ==
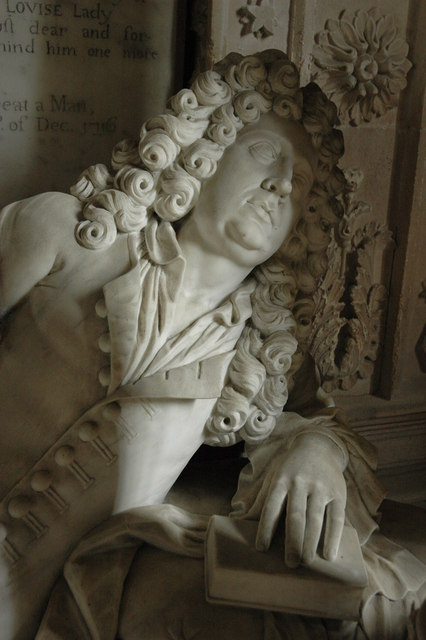
Monument to Sir Robert Atkyns, Sapperton Church

By his first wife Mary, he had an only son and heir, Sir Robert Atkyns the younger. Mary died in 1680. Sir Robert remarried in the following year Anne Dacres, who died in 1712. His son married in 1669 Louisa-Margaret (Louisonne) Carteret, daughter of Sir George Carteret, and died in 1741 without issue.

== Works ==
- Parliamentary and Political Tracts, collected 1734, 2nd ed. 1741. Besides those already mentioned it contains other tracts published in Atkyns's lifetime:
  - An Enquiry into the Power of dispensing with Penal Statutes, which sums up the whole history of dispensations and denies their antiquity
  - a reply to Chief Justice Herbert's review of the authorities in Hale's case, which raised the question of the dispensing power (see both tracts, 11 St. Tr. 1200)
  - a discourse on the ecclesiastical commission of 1686 (in 11 St. Tr. 1148)
  - a speech as chief baron to the lord mayor in 1693 (also in 2 St. Tr. 361), a word of warning as to Louis XIV's designs for a universal and arbitrary monarchy.
- An Enquiry into the Jurisdiction of the Chancery in Causes of Equity, 1695
- A Treatise of the True and Ancient Jurisdiction of the House of Peers, 1699. In many copies of this work is included the case of Tooke v. Atkyns, in which he was defendant, and which, as he allows, makes him write warmly on the subject of equitable jurisdiction.

Legal offices
Preceded by Edward Atkyns	Lord Chief Baron of the Exchequer; 1689–1695	Succeeded by Edward Ward
Parliament of England
Preceded by Not represented in the Second Protectorate Parliament	Member of Parliament for Evesham; 1659; With: Theophilus Andrews	Succeeded by Not represented in the restored Rump
Preceded by Henry Seymour; Jonathan Trelawny	Member of Parliament for East Looe; 1661–1673; With: Henry Seymour	Succeeded by Henry Seymour; Walter Langdon
