= Evesham (constituency) =

Parliamentary constituency in the United Kingdom, 1868–1950

- Former borough constituency for the House of Commons

1295, 1604–1885
- Seats: two until 1868, then one

Worcestershire, Evesham
- Former county constituency for the House of Commons

1885–1950
- Seats: one
- Replaced by: Worcester and South Worcestershire

Evesham was a parliamentary constituency in Worcestershire which was represented in the English and later British House of Commons. Originally a parliamentary borough consisting of the town of Evesham, it was first represented in 1295. After this its franchise lapsed for several centuries, but it then returned two Members of Parliament (MPs) from 1604 until 1868, when its representation was reduced to one member under the Representation of the People Act 1867.

From the 1885 general election, Evesham was abolished as a borough but the name was transferred to a larger county constituency electing one MP. This constituency was abolished for the 1950 general election, with the town of Evesham itself being transferred to the new seat of South Worcestershire. Between 1885 and 1918 the constituency had the full name of the Southern, or Evesham, Division of Worcestershire (not to be confused with the 1950 seat).

== Boundaries ==
- 1604–1885: The parishes of All Saints, Evesham, St Lawrence, Evesham and Bengeworth
- 1885–1918: The petty sessional divisions of Blockley, Evesham, Pershore and Upton-on-Severn, and parts of the petty sessional divisions of Malvern and Redditch
- 1918–1950: The municipal boroughs of Droitwich and Evesham, the rural districts of Droitwich, Evesham, Feckenham, Pershore and Shipston-on-Stour, the parishes of Bredon, Bredon's Norton, Conderton, Overbury and Teddington from the rural district of Tewkesbury and the parts of the rural districts of Stow on the Wold and Winchcombe within the administrative county of Worcestershire

== Members of Parliament ==
=== 1604-1640 ===
Parliament	First member	Second member
1604-1611	Thomas Biggs	Sir Philip Knightley, died and replaced 1605 by Robert Bowyer, appointed to crown office and replaced 1610 by Edward Salter
1614-1622	Sir Thomas Biggs	Anthony Langston
1621	Sir Thomas Biggs	Anthony Langston
1624	Sir Edward Conway	Richard Cresheld
1625	Richard Cresheld	Anthony Langston
1626	Sir John Hare	Anthony Langston
1628	Sir Robert Harley	Richard Cresheld
1629–1640	No Parliaments summoned	

=== 1640-1868 ===
Year	1st Member	1st Party	2nd Member	2nd Party
April 1640	William Sandys	Royalist	William Morton	
November 1640	William Sandys	Royalist	Richard Cresheld	Parliamentarian
1641	John Coventry	Royalist	Richard Cresheld	Parliamentarian
September 1642	Coventry disabled from sitting - seat vacant		Richard Cresheld	Parliamentarian
1645	Samuel Gardner		Richard Cresheld	Parliamentarian
December 1648	Samuel Gardner		Cresheld not recorded as sitting after Pride's Purge	
1653	Evesham was unrepresented in the Barebones Parliament and the First and Second Parliaments of the Protectorate			
January 1659	Theophilus Andrews		Robert Atkyns	
May 1659	Evesham was not represented in the restored Rump			
April 1660	John Egioke		Sir Thomas Rouse	
1661	William Sandys		Abraham Cullen	
1669	William Sandys		Sir John Hanmer	
1670	Sir James Rushout		Sir John Hanmer	
1679	Sir James Rushout		Henry Parker	
1681	Sir James Rushout		Edward Rudge	
1685	Henry Parker		Sir John Matthewes	
1690	Sir James Rushout		Edward Rudge	
1695	Sir James Rushout		Henry Parker	
1698	John Rudge	Whig	Henry Parker	
January 1701	John Rudge	Whig	Sir James Rushout	
November 1701	Hugh Parker		Sir James Rushout	
1702	Hugh Parker		John Rudge	Whig
1708	Sir Edward Goodere		John Rudge	Whig
1715	John Deacle		John Rudge	Whig
1722	Sir John Rushout	Whig	John Rudge	Whig
1734	Sir John Rushout	Whig	William Taylor	
1741	Sir John Rushout	Whig	Edward Rudge	
1754	Sir John Rushout	Whig	John Porter	
1756	Sir John Rushout	Whig	Edward Rudge	
1761	Sir John Rushout	Whig	John Rushout	
1768	George Durant		John Rushout	
1774	Henry Seymour		John Rushout	
1780	Charles Boughton		John Rushout	
1790	Thomas Thompson		John Rushout	
1796	Thomas Thompson		Charles Thellusson	
1802	Patrick Craufurd Bruce		Charles Thellusson	
1806	William Manning	Tory	Humphrey Howorth	Opposition Whig
1807	William Manning	Tory	Sir Manasseh Masseh Lopes	Tory
1808	William Manning	Tory	Humphrey Howorth	Whig
1818	William Rouse-Boughton	Whig	Humphrey Howorth	Whig
1819	Sir Charles Cockerell	Tory	Humphrey Howorth	Whig
1820	Sir Charles Cockerell	Tory	William Rouse-Boughton	Whig
1826	Sir Charles Cockerell	Tory	Edward Protheroe	Whig
1830	Sir Charles Cockerell	Tory	Lord Kennedy	Tory
1831	Sir Charles Cockerell	Tory	Thomas Hudson	Whig
1832	Sir Charles Cockerell	Whig	Thomas Hudson	Whig
1835	Sir Charles Cockerell	Whig	Peter Borthwick	Conservative
1837	George Rushout	Conservative	Peter Borthwick	Conservative
1838	George Rushout	Conservative	Lord Marcus Hill	Whig
1841	Peter Borthwick	Conservative	Lord Marcus Hill	Whig
1847	Sir Henry Willoughby, Bt	Conservative	Lord Marcus Hill	Whig
1852	Sir Henry Willoughby, Bt	Conservative	Grenville Berkeley	Whig
1855	Sir Henry Willoughby, Bt	Conservative	Edward Holland	Whig
1859	Sir Henry Willoughby, Bt	Conservative	Edward Holland	Liberal
1865	James Bourne	Conservative	Edward Holland	Liberal

=== 1868-1950 ===
Election	Member	Party
1868	James Bourne	Conservative
1880	Daniel Rowlinson Ratcliff	Liberal
July 1880	Frederick Lehmann	Liberal
1881	Frederick Dixon-Hartland	Conservative
1885	Sir Richard Temple	Conservative
1892	Sir Edmund Lechmere	Conservative
1895	Charles Wigram Long	Conservative
January 1910	Bolton Eyres-Monsell	Conservative
1935	Rupert de la Bere	Conservative
1950	constituency abolished	

== Elections ==
=== Elections in the 1830s ===
General election 1830: Evesham
Party	Candidate	Votes	%	±%
Tory	Charles Cockerell	231	47.2	
Tory	Archibald Kennedy	148	30.3	
Whig	Alexander Raphael	110	22.5	
Majority		38	7.8	N/A
Turnout		301	c. 70.5	
Registered electors		c. 427		
Tory gain from Whig		Swing		
Tory gain from Whig		Swing		

The 1830 election was declared void on 13 December 1830, but no new writ was issued before dissolution ahead of the 1831 election.

General election 1831: Evesham
Party	Candidate	Votes	%	±%
Tory	Charles Cockerell	208	41.5	−5.7
Whig	Thomas Hudson (MP)	157	31.3	+8.8
Tory	Archibald Kennedy	136	27.1	−3.2
Turnout		327	c. 76.6	c. +6.1
Registered electors		c. 427		
Majority		51	10.2	+2.4
Tory hold		Swing	−5.1	
Majority		21	4.2	N/A
Whig gain from Tory		Swing	+8.9	

General election 1832: Evesham
Party	Candidate	Votes	%	±%
Whig	Charles Cockerell	234	40.9	−0.6
Whig	Thomas Hudson (MP)	212	37.1	+5.8
Tory	Peter Borthwick	126	22.0	−5.1
Majority		86	15.1	+10.9
Turnout		332	92.5	c. +15.9
Registered electors		359		
Whig hold		Swing	+1.0	
Whig gain from Tory		Swing	+4.2	

General election 1835: Evesham
Party	Candidate	Votes	%
Whig	Charles Cockerell	Unopposed	
Conservative	Peter Borthwick	Unopposed	
Registered electors		338	
Whig hold			
Conservative gain from Whig			

Cockerell's death caused a by-election.

By-election, 4 February 1837: Evesham
Party	Candidate	Votes	%
Conservative	George Rushout	165	54.1
Whig	Marcus Hill	140	45.9
Majority		25	8.2
Turnout		305	86.2
Registered electors		354	
Conservative gain from Whig			

General election 1837: Evesham
Party	Candidate	Votes	%
Conservative	Charles Cockerell	168	34.3
Conservative	Peter Borthwick	166	33.9
Whig	Marcus Hill	156	31.8
Majority		10	2.1
Turnout		307	86.7
Registered electors		354	
Conservative hold			
Conservative gain from Whig			

On petition, Borthwick was unseated and Hill declared elected instead.

=== Elections in the 1840s ===
General election 1841: Evesham
Party	Candidate	Votes	%	±%
Whig	Marcus Hill	188	38.7	+6.9
Conservative	Peter Borthwick	161	33.1	−0.8
Conservative	George Rushout	137	28.2	−6.1
Majority		24	4.9	N/A
Turnout		335	87.7	+1.0
Registered electors		382		
Whig gain from Conservative		Swing	+6.9	
Conservative hold		Swing	−2.1	

Hill was appointed Comptroller of the Household, requiring a by-election.

By-election, 11 July 1846: Evesham
Party	Candidate	Votes	%	±%
Whig	Marcus Hill	Unopposed		
Whig hold				

General election 1847: Evesham
Party	Candidate	Votes	%	±%
Whig	Marcus Hill	195	39.2	+19.8
Conservative	Henry Willoughby	172	34.5	−26.8
Whig	Ralph Howard	131	26.3	+6.9
Turnout		249 (est)	70.1 (est)	−17.6
Registered electors		355		
Majority		23	4.7	−0.2
Whig hold		Swing	+16.6	
Majority		41	8.2	
Conservative hold		Swing	−26.8	

=== Elections in the 1850s ===
General election 1852: Evesham
Party	Candidate	Votes	%	±%
Conservative	Henry Willoughby	189	42.4	+7.9
Whig	Grenville Berkeley	170	38.1	−1.1
Radical	Charles Wilkins	87	19.5	−6.8
Turnout		223 (est)	63.9 (est)	−6.2
Registered electors		349		
Majority		19	4.3	−3.9
Conservative hold		Swing	+4.5	
Majority		83	18.6	+13.9
Whig hold		Swing	+1.2	

Berkeley resigned to contest the 1855 by-election in Cheltenham, causing a by-election.

By-election, 11 July 1855: Evesham
Party	Candidate	Votes	%	±%
Whig	Edward Holland	Unopposed		
Whig hold				

General election 1857: Evesham
Party	Candidate	Votes	%	±%
Conservative	Henry Willoughby	172	42.7	+0.3
Whig	Edward Holland	170	42.2	+4.1
Peelite	Henry Robert Addison	61	15.1	N/A
Turnout		202 (est)	61.1 (est)	−2.8
Registered electors		330		
Majority		2	0.5	−3.8
Conservative hold		Swing	−1.9	
Majority		109	27.1	+8.5
Whig hold		Swing	+1.9	

General election 1859: Evesham
Party	Candidate	Votes	%	±%
Conservative	Henry Willoughby	188	48.7	+6.0
Liberal	Edward Holland	149	38.6	−3.6
Independent Liberal	Edwin Chadwick	49	12.7	New
Turnout		193 (est)	57.1 (est)	−4.0
Registered electors		338		
Majority		39	10.1	+9.6
Conservative hold		Swing	+4.8	
Majority		100	25.9	−1.2
Liberal hold		Swing	−4.8	

=== Elections in the 1860s ===
Willoughby's death caused a by-election.

By-election, 4 April 1865: Evesham
Party	Candidate	Votes	%	±%
Conservative	James Bourne	Unopposed		
Conservative hold				

General election 1865: Evesham
Party	Candidate	Votes	%	±%
Conservative	James Bourne	175	53.4	+4.7
Liberal	Edward Holland	124	37.8	−0.8
Liberal	Josiah Harris	29	8.8	N/A
Majority		51	15.6	+5.5
Turnout		299 (est)	88.7 (est)	+31.6
Registered electors		337		
Conservative hold		Swing	+2.8	
Liberal hold		Swing	−2.8	

Seat reduced to one member

General election 1868: Evesham
Party	Candidate	Votes	%	±%
Conservative	James Bourne	347	53.4	0.0
Liberal	Thomas S Richardson	303	46.6	0.0
Majority		44	6.8	−8.8
Turnout		650	84.5	−4.2
Registered electors		769		
Conservative hold		Swing	0.0	

=== Elections in the 1870s ===
General election 1874: Evesham
Party	Candidate	Votes	%	±%
Conservative	James Bourne	346	53.6	+0.2
Liberal	Joseph Napier Higgins	299	46.4	−0.2
Majority		47	7.2	+0.4
Turnout		645	86.7	+2.2
Registered electors		744		
Conservative hold		Swing	+0.2	

=== Elections in the 1880s ===
General election 1880: Evesham
Party	Candidate	Votes	%	±%
Liberal	Daniel Rowlinson Ratcliff	382	50.6	+4.2
Conservative	Algernon Borthwick	373	49.4	−4.2
Majority		9	1.2	N/A
Turnout		755	91.3	+4.6
Registered electors		827		
Liberal gain from Conservative		Swing	+4.2	

The 1880 election was declared void on account of bribery of electors, causing a by-election.

Dixon-Hartland

By-election, 9 Jul 1880: Evesham
Party	Candidate	Votes	%	±%
Liberal	Frederick Lehmann	378	50.1	−0.5
Conservative	Frederick Dixon-Hartland	376	49.9	+0.5
Majority		2	0.3	−0.9
Turnout		754	91.2	−0.1
Registered electors		827		
Liberal hold		Swing	−0.5	

Lehmann's election was declared void, on account of bribery and corruption, and Hartland was then elected after scrutiny.

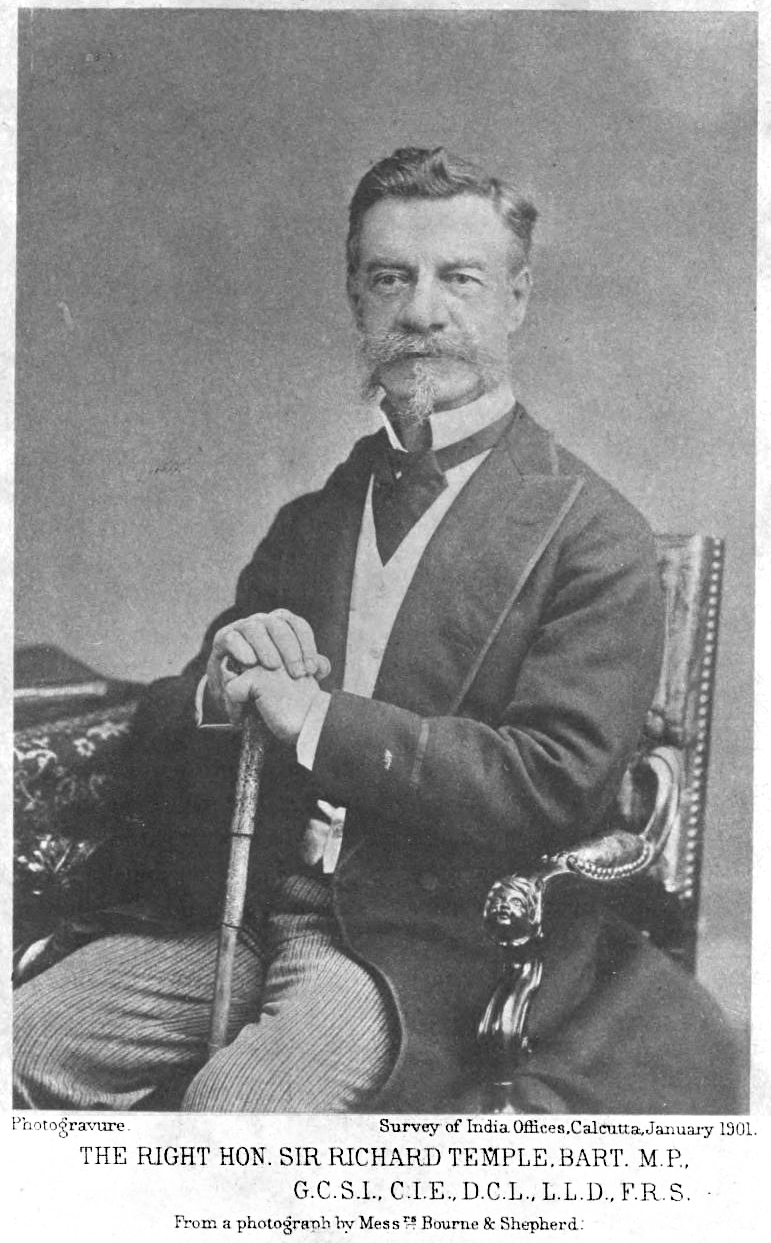
Temple

General election 1885: Evesham
Party	Candidate	Votes	%	±%
Conservative	Richard Temple	4,080	51.5	+2.1
Liberal	Arthur Chamberlain	3,848	48.5	−2.1
Majority		232	3.0	N/A
Turnout		7,928	83.3	−8.0
Registered electors		9,522		
Conservative gain from Liberal		Swing	+2.1	

General election 1886: Evesham
Party	Candidate	Votes	%	±%
Conservative	Richard Temple	4,127	63.3	+11.8
Liberal	Daniel Pidgeon	2,391	36.7	−11.8
Majority		1,736	26.6	+23.6
Turnout		6,518	68.5	−14.8
Registered electors		9,522		
Conservative hold		Swing	+11.8	

=== Elections in the 1890s ===
General election 1892: Evesham
Party	Candidate	Votes	%	±%
Conservative	Edmund Lechmere	4,170	53.7	−9.6
Liberal	Frederick Impey	3,590	46.3	+9.6
Majority		580	7.4	−19.2
Turnout		7,760	81.0	+12.5
Registered electors		9,586		
Conservative hold		Swing	−9.6	

Long

1895 Evesham by-election
Party	Candidate	Votes	%	±%
Conservative	Charles Long	4,760	57.0	+3.3
Liberal	Frederick Impey	3,585	43.0	−3.3
Majority		1,175	14.0	+6.6
Turnout		8,345	84.2	+3.2
Registered electors		9,914		
Conservative hold		Swing	+3.3	

General election 1895: Evesham
Party	Candidate	Votes	%	±%
Conservative	Charles Long	Unopposed		
Conservative hold				

=== Elections in the 1900s ===
General election 1900: Evesham
Party	Candidate	Votes	%	±%
Conservative	Charles Long	Unopposed		
Conservative hold				

General election 1906: Evesham
Party	Candidate	Votes	%	±%
Conservative	Charles Long	4,385	50.5	N/A
Liberal	Arthur Worthington Biggs	4,293	49.5	New
Majority		92	1.0	N/A
Turnout		8,678	89.0	N/A
Registered electors		9,756		
Conservative hold		Swing	N/A	

=== Elections in the 1910s ===
General election January 1910: Evesham
Party	Candidate	Votes	%	±%
Conservative	Bolton Eyres-Monsell	5,416	57.5	+7.0
Liberal	Walter John Burt	3,998	42.5	−7.0
Majority		1,418	15.0	+14.0
Turnout		9,414	90.4	+1.4
Registered electors		10,416		
Conservative hold		Swing	+7.0	

General election December 1910: Evesham
Party	Candidate	Votes	%	±%
Conservative	Bolton Eyres-Monsell	Unopposed		
Conservative hold				

General Election 1914–15:

Another General Election was required to take place before the end of 1915. The political parties had been making preparations for an election to take place and by July 1914, the following candidates had been selected;

- Unionist: Bolton Eyres-Monsell
- Liberal: William Pearce Ellis

General election 1918: Evesham
Party		Candidate	Votes	%	±%
C	Unionist	Bolton Eyres-Monsell	10,479	62.0	N/A
	Liberal	William Pearce Ellis	3,570	21.1	New
	Labour	Walter Metcalfe Fielding	2,863	16.9	New
Majority			6,909	40.9	N/A
Turnout			16,912	58.5	N/A
Registered electors			28,931		
	Unionist hold		Swing	N/A	
C indicates candidate endorsed by the coalition government.

=== Elections in the 1920s ===
General election 1922: Evesham
Party	Candidate	Votes	%	±%
Unionist	Bolton Eyres-Monsell	11,502	59.9	−2.1
Labour	Robert Aldington	7,715	40.1	+23.2
Majority		3,787	19.8	−21.1
Turnout		19,217	65.7	+7.2
Registered electors		29,230		
Unionist hold		Swing	−12.7	

General election 1923: Evesham
Party	Candidate	Votes	%	±%
Unionist	Bolton Eyres-Monsell	10,976	54.5	−5.4
Liberal	William Henry Collett	5,453	27.1	New
Labour	Robert Aldington	3,705	18.4	−21.7
Majority		5,523	27.4	+7.6
Turnout		20,134	67.7	+2.0
Registered electors		29,729		
Unionist hold		Swing	+8.2	

General election 1924: Evesham
Party	Candidate	Votes	%	±%
Unionist	Bolton Eyres-Monsell	13,176	65.5	+11.0
Labour	Robert Aldington	3,473	17.3	−1.1
Liberal	Benjamin Ryle Swift	3,454	17.2	−9.9
Majority		9,703	48.2	+20.8
Turnout		20,103	66.4	−1.3
Registered electors		30,270		
Unionist hold		Swing	+6.1	

General election 1929: Evesham
Party	Candidate	Votes	%	±%
Unionist	Bolton Eyres-Monsell	14,694	48.4	−17.1
Liberal	Selick Davies	11,519	38.0	+20.8
Labour	Robert Aldington	4,138	13.6	−3.7
Majority		3,175	10.4	−37.8
Turnout		30,351	76.4	+10.0
Registered electors		39,721		
Unionist hold		Swing	−19.0	

=== Elections in the 1930s ===
General election 1931: Evesham
Party	Candidate	Votes	%	±%
Conservative	Bolton Eyres-Monsell	Unopposed		
Liberal	Harry Briggs	Withdrew		
Registered electors				
Conservative hold				

- withdrew

General election 1935: Evesham
Party	Candidate	Votes	%	±%
Conservative	Rupert de la Bere	18,757	65.1	N/A
Labour	W E Warder	6,264	21.8	New
Liberal	Christopher a'Becket Williams	3,774	13.1	N/A
Majority		12,493	43.3	N/A
Turnout		28,795	66.4	N/A
Conservative hold		Swing	N/A	

General Election 1939–40:

Another General Election was required to take place before the end of 1940. The political parties had been making preparations for an election to take place and by the Autumn of 1939, the following candidates had been selected;

- Conservative: Rupert de la Bere
- Liberal: W F Newnes
- British Union: John Dowty

=== Elections in the 1940s ===
General election 1945: Evesham
Party	Candidate	Votes	%	±%
Conservative	Rupert de la Bere	17,835	53.4	−11.7
Liberal	Duncan McGuffie	7,849	23.5	+10.4
Common Wealth	Desmond Donnelly	7,727	23.1	New
Majority		9,986	29.9	−13.4
Turnout		33,411	63.3	−3.1
Conservative hold		Swing		
