= Crespigny =

Crespigny, often de Crespigny or Champion de Crespigny, is a surname of Huguenot French origin.

People with the surname include:

- Caroline de Crespigny (née Bathurst; 1797–1861), English poet and translator
- Charles Crespigny Vivian, 2nd Baron Vivian, (1808–1886), British peer and politician
- Sir Claude Champion de Crespigny, 3rd Baronet (1818–1868), English cricketer and army officer
- Sir Claude Champion de Crespigny, 4th Baronet (1847–1935), British adventurer, sportsman, military officer and explorer
- Claude Champion de Crespigny (1873–1910), British soldier and polo player
- Sir Constantine Trent Champion de Crespigny (1882–1952), Australian doctor
- Frederick Champion de Crespigny (1822–1887), English vicar and cricketer
- Hugh Vivian Champion de Crespigny (1897–1969), Australian-British pilot
- Hussey Crespigny Vivian, 3rd Baron Vivian (1834–1893), British diplomat
- Mary Champion de Crespigny (née Clarke; c. 1749–1812), English novelist and letter writer
- Nicholas Crespigny Laurence Vivian, 6th Baron Vivian (1935–2004), British peer and soldier
- Nick Champion de Crespigny (born 1996), Australian rugby player
- Philip Champion de Crespigny (1704–1765), British proctor of the Admiralty court
- Philip Champion de Crespigny (1738–1803), British politician
- Rafe de Crespigny (born 1936), Australian sinologist and historian
- Richard de Crespigny (born 1957), Australian pilot
- Robert Champion de Crespigny (born 1950), Australian mining magnate
- Rose Champion de Crespigny (née Key; 1859–1935), English artist and author
- Thomas Champion de Crespigny (c. 1763–1799), British politician
- Sir William Champion de Crespigny, 2nd Baronet (1765–1829), British politician

== See also ==
- Champion de Crespigny baronets
- Vivian family (baronets and barons)
