= Champion (surname) =

Champion is a surname. Notable people with the surname include:

- Albert Champion (cricketer) (1851–1909), Yorkshire cricketer
- Albert Champion (cyclist) (1878–1927), French road racing cyclist and spark plug manufacturer
- Andrew Champion (born 1970), stage name of Andrew Jennati Ataie, American punk rock singer
- Anthony Champion (1725–1801), English politician and poet
- Beau Champion (born 1986), Australian rugby league footballer
- Bill Champion (actor), British actor in Rockliffe's Babies
- Bill Champion (baseball) (1947–2017), American Major League Baseball player
- Bill Champion (racing driver) (1921–1991), American stock car racing driver
- Bob Champion (born 1948), English jump jockey and subject of the 1983 film Champions
- Bobby Joe Champion (born 1963), American politician
- Cari Champion (born 1978), American television journalist
- Charles Champion (born 1955), French engineer and Airbus executive
- Chris Champion (1961–2018), American professional wrestler
- Édouard Champion (1882–1938), French publisher and bookseller
- Epaphroditus Champion (1756–1834), American politician
- Étienne Marie Antoine Champion de Nansouty (1768–1815), French cavalry commander
- Francis Henry Champion (c. 1817–1902), soap manufacturer in South Australia
- Frederick Walter Champion (1893–1970), English forester and wildlife photographer, who pioneered camera trapping
- George Champion (disambiguation)
  - George Champion (cricketer) (1867–1933), English cricketer
  - George Champion (politician) (1713–1754), English MP
  - George Charles Champion (1851–1927), English entomologist
- Gower Champion (1919–1980), American dancer and choreographer, dance partner of wife Marge Champion
- Grady Champion (born 1969), American blues harmonicist, singer, guitarist and songwriter
- Greg Champion (born c. 1960), Australian songwriter, guitarist and radio personality
- Harry Champion (1866–1942), stage name of William Henry Crump, British music hall composer and performer
- Henry Champion (general) (1751–1836) American general in the Continental Army
- Henry Hyde Champion (1859–1928), Australian social reformer and journalist
- Ian Champion (born 1968), English actor
- Jack Champion (born 2004), American actor
- Jacques Champion de Chambonnières (c. 1601–1672), French Baroque composer also known as Jacques Champion
- Jeanne Champion (1931–2022), French painter and writer
- John C. Champion (1923–1994), American producer and screenwriter
- John George Champion (1815–1854), English soldier, botanist, and explorer
- Jon Champion (born 1965), English football commentator
- Malcolm Champion (1883–1939), New Zealand's first Olympic swimmer and gold medalist
- Marge Champion (1919–2020), American dancer and choreographer, dance partner of husband Gower Champion
- Mark Champion, American radio sportscaster, voice of the Detroit Pistons
- Matt Champion, American rapper, member of hip-hop collective Brockhampton
- Michael Champion, American singer
- Mike Champion (baseball) (born 1955), Major League Baseball player
- Mike Champion (basketball) (born 1964), American basketball player
- Nate Champion (1857–1892), American rancher murdered after being labeled a rustler
- Nick Champion (born 1972), Australian politician
- Nicolas Champion (c. 1475–1533), Franco-Flemish Renaissance composer in the Habsburg court
- Patricia Champion, known as Patricia C. Frist, American businesswoman and philanthropist
- Percy Champion (1887–1957), English footballer
- Philip Champion (born 1976), American basketball player
- Rafe Champion (born 1945), Australian writer
- Reed Champion (1910–1997), American artist
- Richard Champion (footballer) (born 1968), former Australian rules footballer
- Robert Champion, see also Bob Champion above
- Sam Champion (born 1961), American weather anchor
- Todd Champion (born 1960), American retired professional wrestler
- Tom Champion Thomas Matthew Champion (born 1986), English (soccer) footballer
- Tony Champion (born 1963), American football player
- William Champion (metallurgist), an early producer of zinc in the United Kingdom
- William Julius Champion Jr., inventor of board game Kalah
- Will Champion (born 1978), drummer/multi-instrumentalist for the English band Coldplay

People with the surname Champion de Crespigny include:

- Champion de Crespigny baronets, a line of English gentry
- Claude Champion de Crespigny (1873–1910), British soldier and polo player
- Constantine Trent Champion de Crespigny (1882–1952), Australian academic and hospital administrator
- Frederick Champion de Crespigny (1822–1887), English first-class cricketer
- Hugh Champion de Crespigny (1897–1969), senior Royal Air Force officer
- Richard Champion de Crespigny (born 1957), Australian airline pilot during the Qantas Flight 32 engine failure incident
- Richard Rafe Champion de Crespigny (born 1936), Australian academic and China specialist
- Robert Champion de Crespigny (born 1950), Australian mining magnate
- Rose Champion de Crespigny (c. 1859–1935), English artist and author
