= Champion de Crespigny baronets =

Extinct baronetcy in the Baronetage of the United Kingdom

Escutcheon of the Champion de Crespigny baronets

The Champion de Crespigny Baronetcy, of Champion Lodge, Camberwell, in the County of Surrey, was a title in the Baronetage of the United Kingdom, created on 31 October 1805 for Claude Champion de Crespigny.

== Background ==
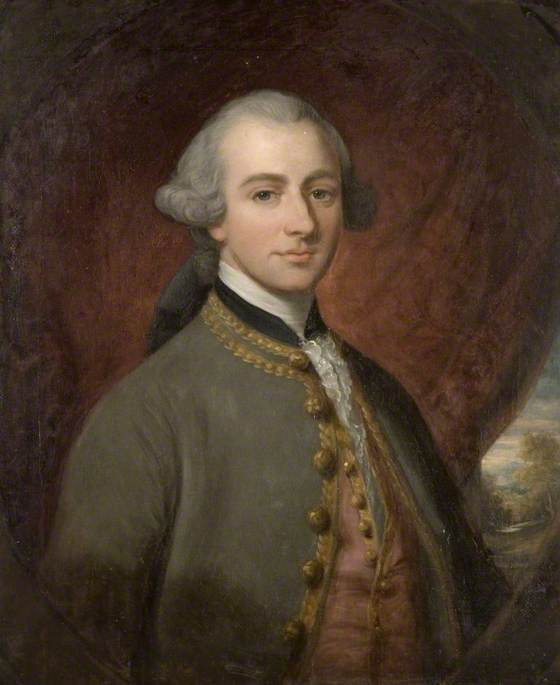
Sir Claude Champion de Crespigny, 1st Baronet

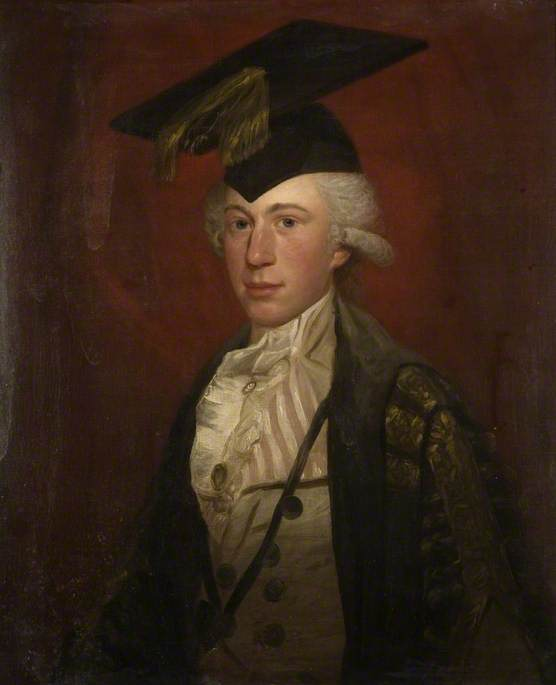
Sir William Champion de Crespigny, 2nd Baronet

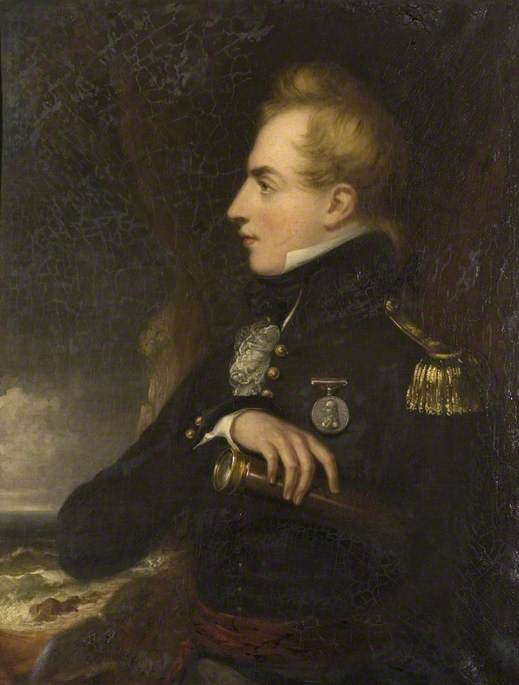
Augustus James Champion de Crespigny

The Champion de Crespigny family originated in Normandy, France. The name Crespigny is probably related to Saint Crispin. The second part of the placename, igny, is common in the northwest of France: there are four places called simply Igny and many which include it in their name. It may be derived from the Latin ignis "fire," with the extended meaning of a hearth-fire and hence a place of settlement. On this basis, Crespigny first acquired its name as a settlement containing a church, a chapel or some form of a shrine to Saint Crispin.

Claude Champion de Crespigny (1620–1697) settled in England after the revocation of the Edict of Nantes and his sons served in the British Army. His grandson Philip Champion de Crespigny (1704–1765) married Anne, daughter of Claude Fonnereau, and was the father of the first Baronet.

The second Baronet sat as the member of parliament for Southampton. The fourth Baronet was a well-known military adventurer and sportsman. He was eccentric enough to bribe hangman James Berry into accepting him as assistant executioner on the occasion of a triple hanging in Carlisle on 8 February 1886. The title became extinct on the death of the eighth Baronet in 1952.

The 8th and last member was Sir Vivian Tyrell de Crespigny, OBE (25 April 1907 – 3 March 1952), who married Helen in 1930 and had a daughter Fleur (later Horley) in 1937, divorced and married Monica Fleming; Helen married one Whitehead. Both couples divorced and De Crespigny and Helen Whitehead remarried in 1947. They divorced in 1951 and he died the following year of a self-inflicted gunshot wound.

In 1775, Crespigny House was built for the first Baronet in Aldeburgh, Suffolk, where his brother, Philip Champion de Crespigny (1738–1803), was the member of parliament from 1780 to 1790. The family also lived at Champion Lodge in Camberwell, London, which was built in 1715 and demolished in 1841, and later at Champion Lodge in Maldon, Essex.

== Champion de Crespigny baronets, of Champion Lodge (1805) ==
- Sir Claude Champion de Crespigny, 1st Baronet (1734–1818)
- Sir William Champion de Crespigny, 2nd Baronet (1765–1829)
  - Augustus James Champion de Crespigny RN (1791–1825), father of the 3rd Baronet.
- Sir Claude William Champion de Crespigny, 3rd Baronet (1818–1868)
- Sir Claude Champion de Crespigny, 4th Baronet (1847–1935)
- Sir Claude Raul Champion de Crespigny, 5th Baronet (1878–1941)
- Sir Henry Champion de Crespigny, 6th Baronet (1882–1946)
- Sir Frederick Philip Champion de Crespigny, 7th Baronet (1884–1947)
- Sir Vivian Tyrell Champion de Crespigny, 8th Baronet (1907–1952)

== Extended family ==
Notable members of the family include the soldier and polo player Claude Champion de Crespigny (1873–1910), who was the son of the fourth Baronet, and the artist and author Rose Champion de Crespigny (1859–1935), whose second son became the seventh Baronet. The poet Caroline de Crespigny was the daughter-in-law of the second Baronet.

In Australia, medical doctor C. T. C. de Crespigny was the great-grandnephew of the first Baronet. His grandson is sinologist and historian Rafe de Crespigny.

== See also ==
- Crespigny

Baronetage of the United Kingdom
Preceded by Wigram baronets	Champion de Crespigny baronets of Champion House; 31 October 1805	Succeeded by Lopes baronets
