= Herbert Pakington, 4th Baron Hampton =

The Right Honourable The Lord Hampton
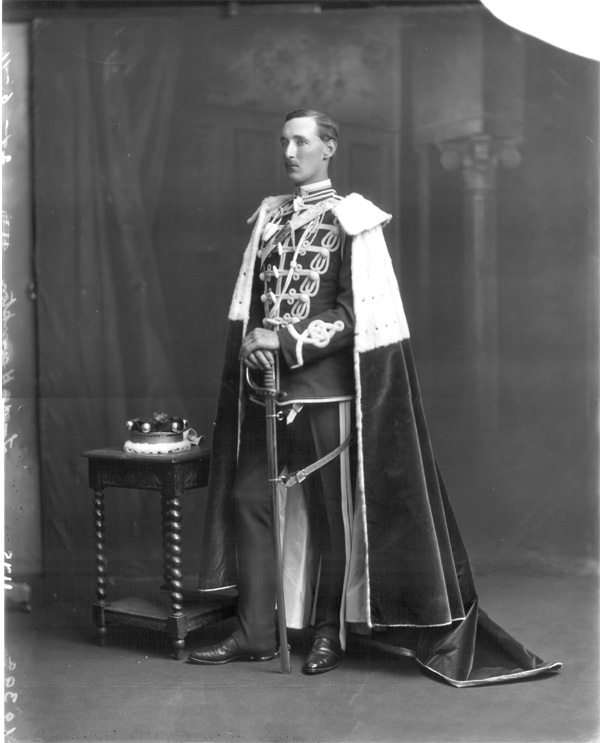
- Lord Hampton in coronation robes, 1911
- Born: Herbert Stuart Pakington; 15 May 1883
- Died: 30 October 1962 (aged 79)
- Education: Wellington College, Berkshire; Royal Military College, Sandhurst
- Occupation: Chief Commissioner of The Scout Association
- Awards: Boy Scouts of America Silver Buffalo Award (1931)

Herbert Stuart Pakington, 4th Baron Hampton (15 May 1883 – 30 October 1962), served as Chief Commissioner of The Scout Association.

He was educated at Wellington College, Berkshire, and the Royal Military College, Sandhurst. He became the 4th Baron Hampton on the death of his father, Herbert Pakington, 3rd Baron Hampton, in 1906. He was a 1931 recipient of the Silver Buffalo Award.

Pakington's sister Mary Pakington was an English dramatist.

== Published works ==
- Herbert Stuart Pakington (1925). Scouting Sketches: Being An Apology, a Prologue, and Ten Effusions in Praise of the Game. London: C. Arthur Pearson. "with a Foreword by B-P"

== See also ==
- Baron Hampton
- Pakington baronets
- Pakington family

Peerage of the United Kingdom
Preceded by Herbert Pakington	Baron Hampton; 1906–1962	Succeeded by Humphrey Pakington
Baronetage of the United Kingdom
Preceded by Herbert Pakington	Baron Hampton of Westwood Park; 1906–1962	Succeeded by Humphrey Pakington
