= Thomas Champion de Crespigny =

British lawyer and politician

Member of Parliament for Sudbury
- In office 1790–1796 Serving with John Hippisley
- Preceded by: William Smith; John Langston
- Succeeded by: William Smith; Sir James Marriott

Personal details
- Born: c. 1763
- Died: 2 August 1799 (aged 35–36)
- Spouse: Augusta Charlotte Thellusson (after 1798)
- Children: Augusta Anne Pakington, Baroness Hampton
- Parent(s): Philip Champion de Crespigny; Sarah Cocksedge
- Education: Trinity Hall, Cambridge

Thomas Champion de Crespigny (c. 1763 – 2 August 1799) was a British lawyer and politician who sat in the House of Commons between 1790 and 1796.

== Early life ==
He was the second son of Philip Champion de Crespigny and, his first wife, Sarah Cocksedge, a daughter of Thomas Cocksedge of Thetford, Norfolk and Lydia Burgess. After his mother's death, his father remarried three more times. From his father's other marriages, his half-siblings included Eliza Champion de Crespigny (wife of Hussey Vivian, 1st Baron Vivian). His paternal grandfather was Philip Champion de Crespigny, proctor of the Admiralty court and his uncle, Claude Champion de Crespigny, was made a baronet in 1805.

He attended Trinity Hall, Cambridge in 1779, obtaining an LLB in 1785 and an LLD in 1790.

== Career ==
Crespigny was a civil lawyer. In 1790, he revived his father's interest at Sudbury in alliance with William Windham. Crespigny and Windham's nominee, John Hippisley, defeated the ministerial candidates. He was a supporter of the repeal of the Test Act in Scotland in April 1791 and voted with the opposition on William Pitt's Russian policy in April 1791 and March 1792. He joined a Whig club in January 1792.

On 27 November 1792 he presented the Castle Baynard ward petition against Pitt's measures to curb sedition. He denied Hippisley's allegations that the measure "was obtained by misrepresentation and claimed that Hippisley had done all that he could to frustrate the petition."

He did not seek re-election in 1796 and the family interest at Sudbury ended.

== Personal life ==
On 26 March 1798, Champion de Crespigny was married to Augusta Charlotte Thellusson (d. 1853), a daughter of merchant Peter Thellusson and granddaughter of Genevan banker and diplomat Isaac de Thellusson. Among her siblings were Peter Isaac Thellusson, 1st Baron Rendlesham, George Woodford Thellusson, and Charles Thellusson, who all served as Members of Parliament. Her younger sister, Anne Thellusson, was the wife of Vice-Admiral William Lukin. Before his death, they were the parents of:

- Augusta Anne Champion de Crespigny (c. 1800–1892), who married Col. Thomas Henry Hastings Davies of Elmley Castle, MP for Worcester, who fought with the Duke of Wellington in the Peninsular and at Waterloo, before 1846. After his death she married Sir John Pakington, Bt, the Secretary of State for War who was a son of William Russell and Elizabeth Pakington, in 1851. In 1874 he was made Baron Hampton and Augusta became Baroness Hampton.

Champion de Crespigny died on 2 August 1799. His widow married Sir Joseph Whatley, KCH on 3 February 1827 before her death on 24 July 1853.

Parliament of Great Britain
| Preceded by William Smith; John Langston | Member of Parliament for Sudbury; 1790–1796; With: John Hippisley | Succeeded by William Smith; Sir James Marriott |
