= Pakington family =

Pakington is the name of an English Worcestershire family, now represented by the barony of Hampton.

Sir John Pakington (died 1551) was a successful lawyer. Henry VIII granted him the right to wear his hat in the royal presence in 1529, and enriched him with estates, including that of Westwood in Worcestershire. His grandnephew and heir, Sir John Pakington, was a prominent courtier, Queen Elizabeth's "lusty Pakington", famous for his magnificence of living.

His son John (1600–1624) was created a baronet in 1620. His son, Sir John, the second baronet (1620–1680), played an active part on the royalist side in the troubles of the Great Rebellion and the Commonwealth, and was taken prisoner at Worcester in 1651; Lady Dorothy, his wife (died 1679), daughter of the lord keeper Thomas Coventry, was famous for her learning, and was long credited with the authorship of The Whole Duty of Man (1658), more recently attributed to Richard Allestree. Their grandson, Sir John, the 4th baronet (1671–1727), was a pronounced high Tory and was very prominent in political life; for long he was regarded as the original of Joseph Addison's Sir Roger de Coverley, but the reasons for this supposition are now regarded as inadequate.

The baronetcy became extinct with the death of Sir John Pakington, the 8th baronet, in January 1830, but it was revived in 1846 for his maternal nephew and heir, John Somerset Pakington (1799–1880), whose name was originally Russell. Born on 20 February 1799 and educated at Eton College and at Oriel College, Oxford, Pakington had a long career as an active and industrious Conservative politician, being member of parliament for Droitwich from 1837 to 1874. He was secretary for war and the colonies in 1852; first Lord of the Admiralty in 1858-1859 and again in 1866-1867; and secretary of state for war in 1867–1868. In 1874, he was created Baron Hampton, and he died in London on 9 April 1880. From 1875 until his death, Hampton was chief civil service commissioner.

Mary Pakington, the daughter of Herbert Perrott Murray Pakington (1848–1906), the Third Baron Hampton, was an English dramatist. In 1906 Herbert Stuart (born 1883) became the 4th Baron Hampton.
