= Albert Champion =

Albert Champion may refer to:

- Albert Champion (cricketer) (1851–1909), Yorkshire cricketer
- Albert Champion (cyclist) (1878–1927), French road racing cyclist
