= Sir William Champion de Crespigny, 2nd Baronet =

British politician

Sir William Champion de Crespigny, Bt
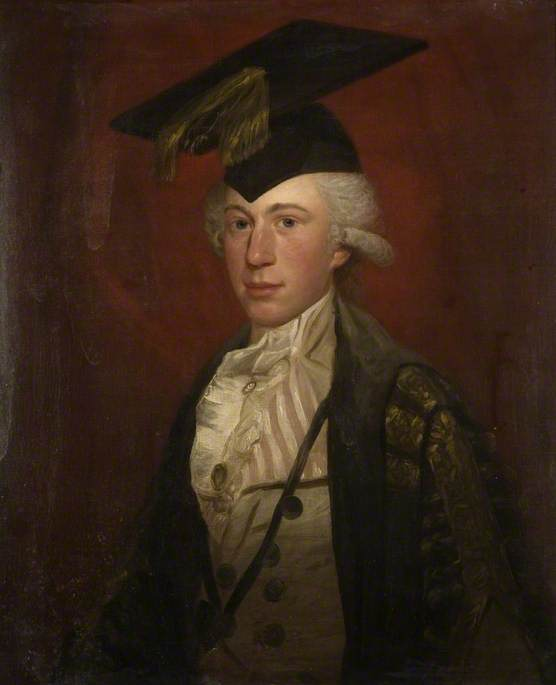

Member of Parliament for Southampton
- In office 1818–1826 Serving with William Chamberlayne
- Preceded by: William Chamberlayne; Arthur Atherley
- Succeeded by: William Chamberlayne; Abel Rous Dottin

Personal details
- Born: 1 January 1765
- Died: 28 December 1829 (aged 64)
- Party: Whig
- Spouse: Lady Sarah Windsor (m. 1786; died 1825)
- Relations: Philip Champion de Crespigny (uncle); Thomas Champion de Crespigny (cousin)
- Children: 10
- Parent(s): Sir Claude Champion de Crespigny, 1st Baronet; Mary Clarke
- Education: Eton College
- Alma mater: Trinity College, Cambridge

Sir William Champion de Crespigny, 2nd Baronet (1 January 1765 – 28 December 1829) was a British politician who sat in the House of Commons between 1818 and 1826.

== Early life ==
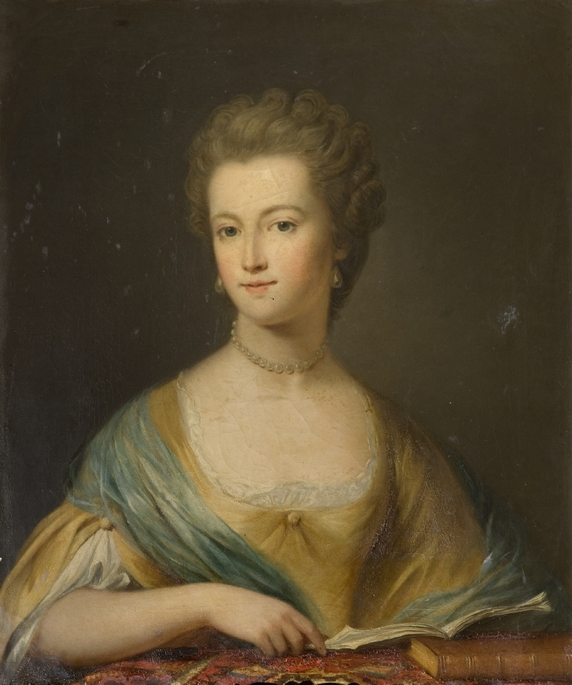
Portrait of his mother, Mary Clarke

Crespigny was born on 1 January 1765. He was the only son of Sir Claude Champion de Crespigny, 1st Baronet (1734–1818) and the former Mary Clarke, daughter and heiress of Joseph Clarke. His paternal grandfather was Philip Champion de Crespigny, proctor of the Admiralty court. The Champion de Crespigny family originated in Normandy, France. Among his extended family was uncle Philip Champion de Crespigny, and cousin, Thomas Champion de Crespigny, who both served in Parliament.

He educated at Eton College from 1777 to 1780 and at Trinity College, Cambridge from 1783 to 1786, when he received his LLB degree.

== Career ==
He succeeded his father as 2nd Baronet Champion de Crespigny, of Champion Lodge, Camberwell, Count of Surrey, on 28 January 1818.

=== Political career ===
Crespigny sat as a Whig Member of Parliament for Southampton from 1818 to 1826. While in the House, he "presented petitions urging government to address agricultural distress", "spoke in support of the enfranchisement of Leeds", "presented a London merchants' petition demanding better protection from foreign competition and attacking the East India Company's monopoly, the level of military expenditure and the corn laws", and "endorsed a petition against the 'obnoxious' Irish window tax and demanded its abolition both there and in England" in 1822. At the end of the 1826 term, De Crespigny, who had been widowed since December 1825, "retired on account of ill health, citing 'palsy and apoplexy' in his parting constituency address and likening himself to a dying swan on the hustings."

== Personal life ==
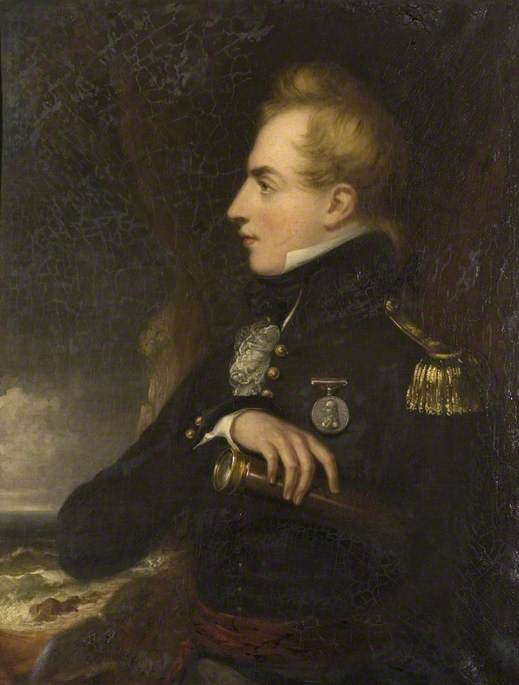
Portrait of his son, Augustus James Champion de Crespigny

On 5 August 1786, William was married to Lady Sarah Windsor, daughter of Other Windsor, 4th Earl of Plymouth and the former Hon. Catherine Archer (daughter of Thomas Archer, 1st Baron Archer). Together, they were the parents of five sons (three of whom died before him) and five daughters (two of whom died before him), including:

- Claude Champion de Crespigny (c. 1787–1813), a Lieutenant in the Royal Navy who died in Palermo, Sicily in 1813.
- William Other Robert Champion de Crespigny (1789–1816), an officer in the Royal Navy who died while on active service in 1816.
- Augustus James Champion de Crespigny (1791–1825), an officer in the Royal Navy who died from yellow fever on board the HMS Scylla in 1825; he married Caroline Smijth, daughter of Sir William Smijth, 7th Baronet, in 1817.
- Sarah Champion de Crespigny (1792–1805), who died in youth.
- Frances Champion de Crespigny (1793–c. 1794), who died in infancy.
- Heaton Champion de Crespigny (1796–1858), the vicar of Neatishead who married Caroline Bathurst, daughter of Rt. Rev. Dr. Henry Bathurst, in 1820.
- Mary Catherine Champion de Crespigny (1798–1858), who married Rev. John Brigstocke in 1830.
- Patience Anne Champion de Crespigny (c. 1800–1831), who married Rev. Hon. Paul Anthony Irby, son of Frederick Irby, 2nd Baron Boston, in 1814.
- Emma Honoria Dorothy Champion de Crespigny (1800–1883), who died unmarried.
- Herbert Joseph Champion de Crespigny (1806–1881), who married Caroline Smijth, his elder brother Augustus' widow, in 1831.

Lady Sarah died in December 1825. Sir William died on 28 December 1829. By his will, dated 27 February 1829, the proceeds from the sale of his leasehold estates and the residue of his personal estate, sworn under £14,000, was distributed among his surviving children. As his eldest surviving son predeceased him, baronetcy and entrusted family properties passed to his grandson, Claude.

=== Descendants ===
Through his son Augustus, he was a grandfather of Sir Claude Champion de Crespigny, 3rd Baronet and Frederick Champion de Crespigny, both first-class cricketers. His great grandson, Sir Claude Champion de Crespigny (1847-1935), the fourth Baronet, was a well-known military adventurer and sportsman, who was eccentric enough to bribe hangman James Berry into accepting him as assistant executioner on the occasion of a triple hanging in Carlisle on 8 February 1886.

Parliament of the United Kingdom
Preceded by William Chamberlayne; Arthur Atherley	Member of Parliament for Southampton; 1818–1826; With: William Chamberlayne	Succeeded by William Chamberlayne; Abel Rous Dottin
Peerage of the United Kingdom
Preceded by Claude Champion de Crespigny	Champion de Crespigny baronets (of Champion Lodge); 1818–1829	Succeeded by Claude Champion de Crespigny
