= Herbert Pakington =

Herbert Pakington may refer to:

- Sir Herbert Pakington, 5th Baronet, English politician
- Herbert Pakington, 4th Baron Hampton, chief commissioner of the Scout Association
