= Champion Lodge =

Large house in South London, England

Coordinates: 51.471°N 0.093°W

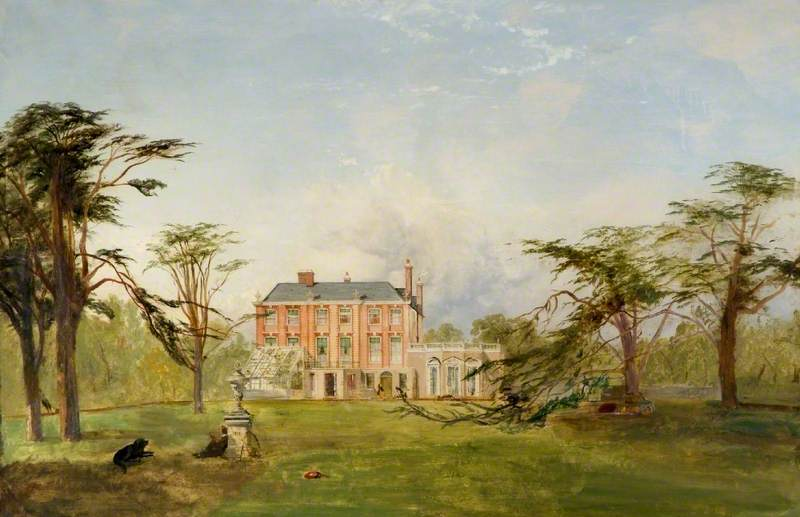
Champion Lodge

Champion Lodge was a large house at Camberwell in London.

== History ==
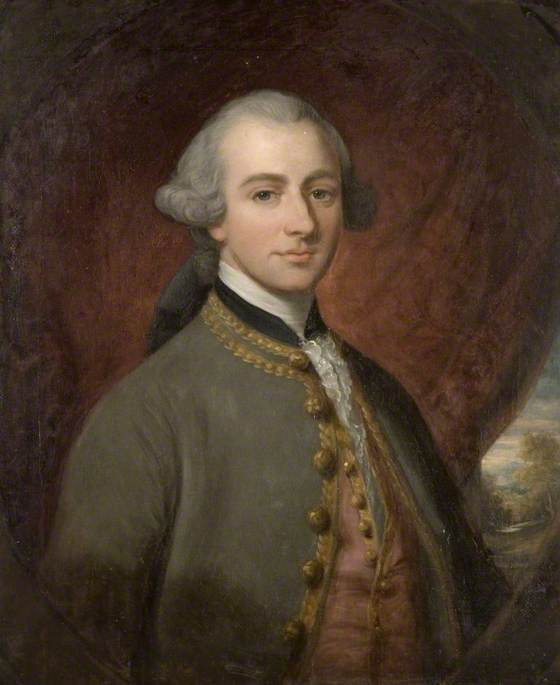
Portrait of Sir Claude Champion de Crespigny, 1st Baronet

Philip Champion de Crespigny (1704–1765), proctor of the Admiralty court, began leasing the house around 1741 and purchased it in 1755, renaming it Champion Lodge. The Prince of Wales (later to become George IV) visited the lodge in 1804 and Claude Champion de Crespigny (1734–1818), eldest son of Philip, the then owner of the house, was made a baronet in 1805.

=== Demolition ===
The lodge, which was originally surrounded by a 30-acre park, was demolished in 1841 while Sir Claude Champion de Crespigny was the 3rd Baronet. It was roughly at the junction of where Love Walk meets Denmark Hill today.

== See also ==
- Champion de Crespigny baronets
