= George Champion =

George Champion may refer to:

- George Champion (cricketer) (1867–1933), English cricketer
- George Champion (politician) (1713–1754), English MP
- George Charles Champion (1851–1927), English entomologist
