= Qantas Flight 32 =

2010 aviation accident over Indonesia

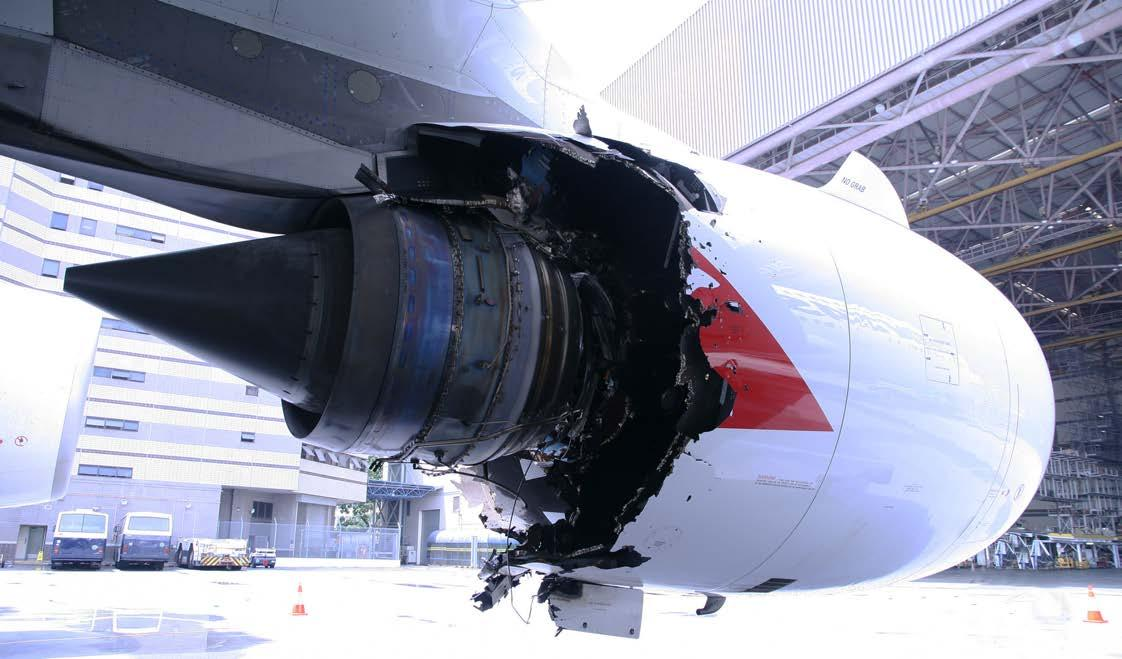
- The damage to the left inboard Rolls-Royce Trent 900 engine of the aircraft

Accident
- Date: 4 November 2010
- Summary: Uncontained engine failure
- Site: Over Batam Island, Indonesia; 1.11°N 104.04°E

Aircraft
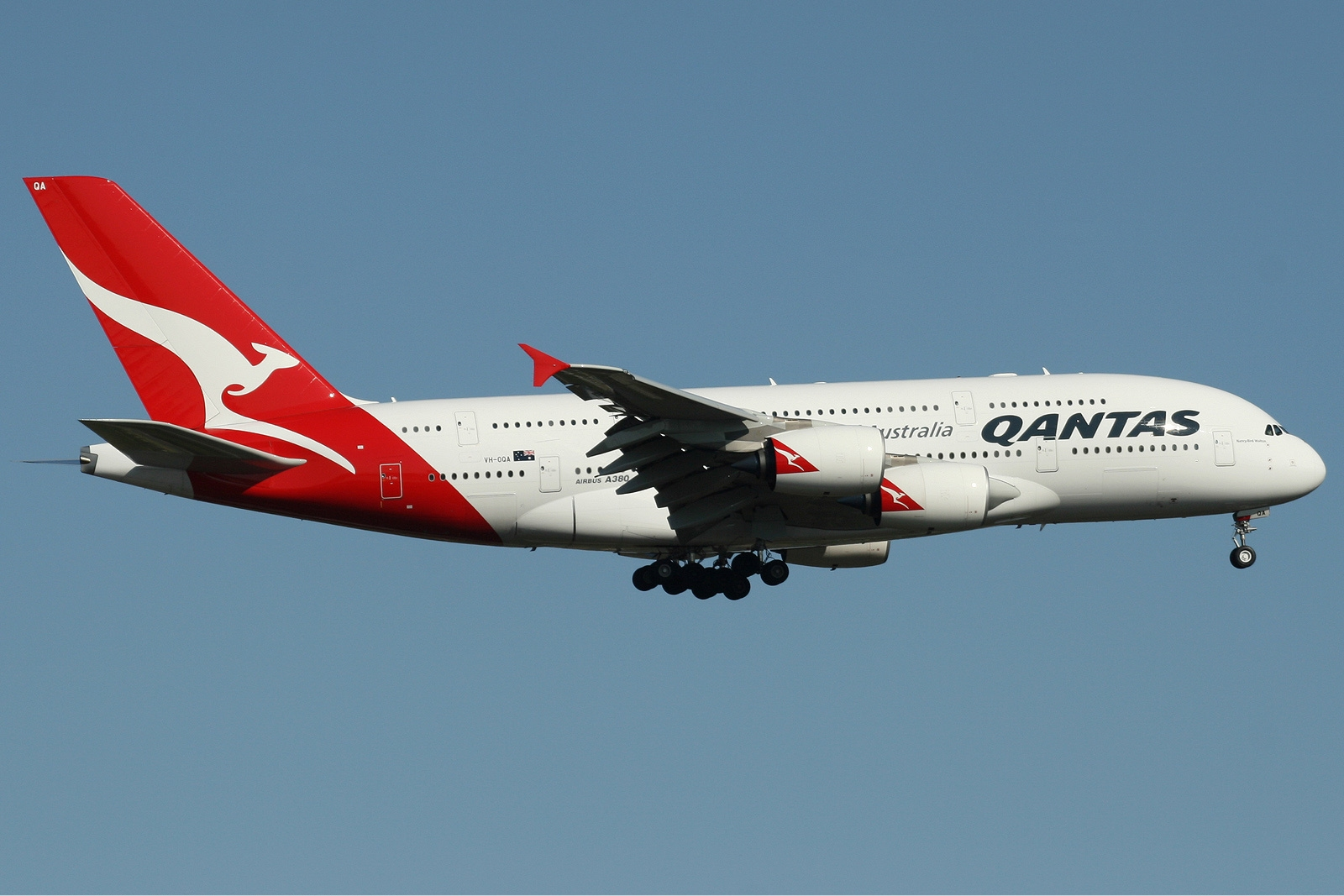
- VH-OQA, the aircraft involved in the accident, photographed in 2008
- Aircraft type: Airbus A380-842 (Note: 42 denotes it was equipped with Rolls-Royce Trent 972 engines.)
- Aircraft name: Nancy-Bird Walton
- Operator: Qantas
- IATA flight No.: QF32
- ICAO flight No.: QFA32
- Call sign: QANTAS 32
- Registration: VH-OQA
- Flight origin: Heathrow Airport, London, England
- Stopover: Changi Airport, Changi, Singapore
- Destination: Sydney Airport, Sydney, Australia
- Occupants: 469
- Passengers: 440
- Crew: 29
- Fatalities: 0
- Survivors: 469

Qantas Flight 32 was a regularly scheduled passenger flight from London to Sydney via Singapore. On 4 November 2010, the Airbus A380 operating the route suffered an uncontained failure in one of its four Rolls-Royce Trent 900 engines. The failure occurred over the Riau Islands, Indonesia, four minutes after takeoff from Singapore Changi Airport. After holding for almost two hours to assess the situation, the aircraft made a successful emergency landing at Changi. No injuries occurred to the passengers, crew, or people on the ground, despite debris from the aircraft falling onto houses in Batam.

On inspection, it was found that a turbine disc in the aircraft's number-two engine (on the port side nearer the fuselage) had disintegrated, causing extensive damage to the nacelle, wing, fuel system, landing gear, flight controls, and engine controls, and a fire in a fuel tank that self-extinguished. The subsequent investigation concluded that the failure had been caused by the breaking of a stub oil pipe which had been manufactured improperly.

The failure was the first of its kind for the A380, the world's largest passenger aircraft. At the time, 39 A380s were operating with five airlines: Qantas, Air France, Emirates, Lufthansa, and Singapore Airlines. The accident led to the temporary grounding of the rest of the six-plane Qantas A380 fleet. It also led to groundings, inspections, and engine replacements on some other Rolls-Royce-powered A380s in service with Lufthansa and Singapore Airlines, but not in the A380s of Air France or Emirates, which were powered by Engine Alliance engines.

== Accident ==
The accident, at 10:01 am Singapore Standard Time (02:01 UTC), was caused by an uncontained failure of the port inboard (number-two) engine, while en route over Batam Island, Indonesia.

Shrapnel from the engine punctured part of the wing and damaged the fuel system, causing leaks and a fuel-tank fire, disabled one hydraulic system and the anti-lock braking system, caused the number-one and number-four engines to go into a "degraded" mode, and damaged landing flaps and the controls for the outer left number-one engine. The crew, after finding the plane controllable, decided to fly a holding pattern close to Singapore Changi Airport, while assessing the status of the aircraft. Completing this initial assessment took 50 minutes. The first officer and supervising check captain (SCC) then put the plane's status into the landing distance performance application (LDPA) for a landing 50 tonnes over maximum landing weight at Changi. Based on these inputs, the LDPA could not calculate a landing distance. After discussion, the crew elected to remove inputs related to a wet runway, in the knowledge that the runway was dry. The LDPA then returned the information that the landing was feasible with 100 m (330 ft) of runway remaining. The flight then returned to Changi Airport, landing safely after the crew extended the landing gear by a gravity drop emergency extension system, at 11:45 am Singapore time. As a result of the aircraft landing 35 kn (65 km/h; 40 mph) faster than normal, four tyres were blown.

Upon landing, the crew was unable to shut down the number-one engine, which had to be doused by emergency crews until flameout was achieved. The pilots considered whether to evacuate the plane immediately after landing, as fuel was leaking from the left wing near to the brakes, which were assumed to be extremely hot from maximum braking. The SCC pilot, David Evans, noted in an interview,

We’ve got a situation where there is fuel, hot brakes, and an engine that we can’t shut down. And really the safest place was on board the aircraft until such time as things changed. So, we had the cabin crew with an alert phase the whole time through ready to evacuate, open doors, inflate slides at any moment. As time went by, that danger abated, and thankfully, we were lucky enough to get everybody off very calmly and very methodically through one set of stairs.

The plane was on battery power and had to contend with only one VHF radio to coordinate emergency procedure with the local fire crew.

No injuries were reported among the 440 passengers and 29 crew on board the plane. On Batam Island, some debris fell on a school, some houses, and a car.

== Aircraft ==
The aircraft involved was an Airbus A380-842, registration number VH-OQA, serial number 014. Having entered service in September 2008, it was the first A380 delivered to Qantas and had four Rolls-Royce Trent 900 engines; it was named Nancy-Bird Walton (Note: Also spelled Nancy Bird-Walton) in honour of an Australian aviation pioneer. After completing repairs in Singapore, estimated at about $139 million, the aircraft returned to Sydney in April 2012.

== Flight crew ==
The pilot in command of the aircraft, Captain Richard Champion de Crespigny, has been credited in the media as "having guided a heavily damaged double-decker jet to the safety of Singapore Changi Airport and averting what could have been a catastrophe". At the time of the accident, he had 35 years of flying experience. He was commended for debriefing the passengers in the passenger terminal after the flight, disclosing details of the flight and offering care for his passengers. In 2016, Champion de Crespigny was appointed a Member of the Order of Australia for significant service to the aviation industry, both nationally and internationally, particularly to flight safety, and to the community.

In 2010, Richard Woodward, a vice president of the Australian and International Pilots Association, reported that five pilots were in the cockpit of this flight. In addition to the normal crew of pilot-in-command and co-pilot, there was an experienced relief pilot and two additional check captains; one was being trained as a check captain (CC) and the supervising CC, who was training the CC. Captain Champion de Crespigny concentrated on flying and managing the aircraft while the co-pilot focused on monitoring and sifting through the 100 electronic centralised aircraft monitor (ECAM) checklists. The supernumerary pilots monitored all actions and assisted where necessary.

== Aftermath ==
=== Stock markets ===
Immediately after the accident, shares in the engine's manufacturer, Rolls-Royce Holdings, fell 5.5% on the London Stock Exchange, their sharpest fall in 18 months, and directly attributed to this occurrence. Shares in Airbus, then known as European Aeronautic Defence and Space Company (EADS), also fell. The Qantas share price fell 5% initially, falling further over the next few days.

By 8 November 2010, Rolls-Royce shares had fallen by more than 10% since the accident.

=== Grounding of aircraft and replacement of engines ===
Both Qantas and Singapore Airlines, which uses the same Rolls-Royce engine in its A380 aircraft, temporarily grounded their A380 fleets after the occurrence and performed further inspections. Singapore Airlines resumed operations the following day.

Investigation of all four other operational Qantas A380s revealed concerns with two engines. Those engines were to be replaced, after which operation was expected to be resumed. The problems with one of these engines "could have potentially led to a repeat of Thursday's incident on QF32". On 8 November 2010 the CEO of Qantas, Alan Joyce, stated that the A380 fleet would remain grounded because new issues in the engines appeared, including oil leaks within the engines, something Joyce said was "beyond normal tolerances". Singapore Airlines, which initially stated it "did not find any issues of concern" after inspecting the engines of its A380s, announced on 10 November it planned to replace three engines on three separate planes, grounding the aircraft in question until the issues were resolved. The airline allowed the planes to return to Singapore after discovery of the anomaly. On 10 November, Lufthansa announced the replacement of an engine on its first A380, which it termed "precautionary". On 3 December, Qantas announced that a total of 16 Trent 900 engines needed to have repairs made or be replaced entirely; at the time of the announcement, the airline said five had already been replaced.

On 23 November, Qantas announced that it would begin to partially return its fleet of A380s to service, beginning on 27 November. Initially, two of its six A380s were brought back into use, while the rest of the fleet stayed grounded pending inspections and engine changes. The two aircraft entered service on the Sydney–Singapore–London route, where the engines use less than maximum thrust. Qantas initially refrained from using the aircraft on routes between Los Angeles and Australia, the longest routes globally served by the A380, where highest engine performance was required on takeoff. After talks with the manufacturers and regulators indicated the aircraft was safe to use, Qantas resumed using the A380 on the Los Angeles routes in January 2011. By the end of January, Qantas operated all but one of its A380s. VH-OQA, the aircraft damaged in the accident, returned to service in April 2012.

=== Reactions regarding significance ===
Tom Ballantyne, a writer on Orient Aviation magazine, described the accident as "certainly the most serious incident that the A380 has experienced since it entered operations", and concerns have been voiced that this occurrence may be due to a "major problem", rather than being maintenance-related. Qantas CEO Alan Joyce stated on 5 November that Qantas considered the likely cause "some kind of material failure or a design issue".

The damage, described in the Sydney Morning Herald as "potentially life-threatening and extremely rare", caused aircraft engineer Peter Marosszeky, from the University of New South Wales, to state, "I rarely ever see a failure like this on any engine", while Paul Cousins, the federal president of the Australian Licensed Aircraft Engineers Association, stated, "fewer than 5% of engine failures involved debris leaving the casing of the engine", as was the case in this occurrence.

Carey Edwards, author, former Royal Air Force helicopter pilot, and human-factors expert, described the QF32 flight as "one of the finest examples of airmanship in the history of aviation". In 2011, Qantas stated that "the reputation of the airline has been enhanced in the eyes of other Qantas staff and the Australian public".

=== Operational history ===
This Airbus A380 occurrence followed two previous incidents involving Rolls-Royce Trent 900 engines. In September 2009, an engine malfunctioned on a Singapore Airlines flight from Paris to Singapore, and a Tokyo-Frankfurt Lufthansa flight in August 2010 had engine trouble that resulted in one engine being shut down due to low oil pressure. In September 2017, an Air France A380 powered by Engine Alliance turbofans (made by General Electric Aircraft Engines and Pratt & Whitney) suffered an engine failure on a flight from Paris to Los Angeles.

An airworthiness directive was issued by the European Aviation Safety Agency on 4 August 2010 that required inspection of the Rolls-Royce Trent 900 engine.

== Investigation ==
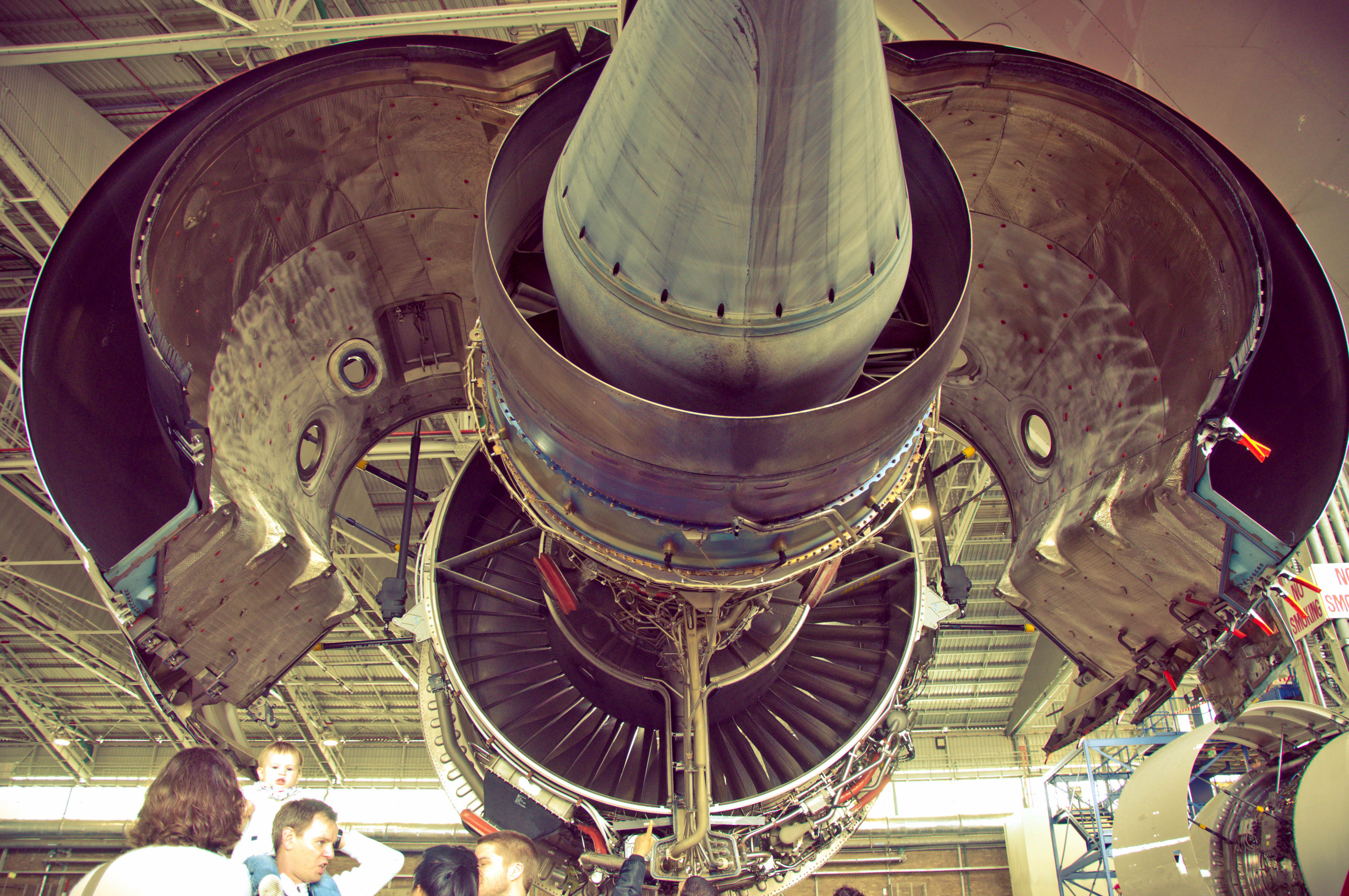
Engine nacelle of a Qantas A380 open for inspection, showing Rolls-Royce Trent 900 components

The investigation by the Australian Transport Safety Bureau (ATSB) indicated that "fatigue cracking" in a stub pipe within the engine resulted in oil leakage, followed by an oil fire in the engine. The fire led to the release of the intermediate-pressure turbine (IPT) disc. It also said the issue is specific to the Trent 900.

Rolls-Royce determined that the direct cause of the oil fire and resulting engine failure was a misaligned counter bore within a stub oil pipe, leading to a fatigue fracture. The ATSB's preliminary investigation report confirmed Rolls-Royce's findings.

Airbus determined that the IPT disc released three different high-energy fragments, resulting in structural and systems damage. It also concluded that segregated wiring routes were cut by two of the three individual pieces of disc debris and as a result, engine number one could not be shut down after landing.

On 10 November 2010, the European Aviation Safety Agency issued an emergency airworthiness directive, ordering airlines using the Trent 900 engine to conduct frequent and stringent tests – extended ground idle runs, low-pressure turbine (LPT) stage-one blade and case drain inspections, and high-pressure/intermediate-pressure (HP/IP) structure air-buffer cavity and oil-service tube inspections. However, on 22 November, the EASA eased its inspection guidelines, citing progress in the investigation. It dropped requirements for extended ground idle runs and requirements for repetitive inspections of the LPT stage-one blades and case drain. On 2 December 2010, the ATSB recommended a one-off inspection of the "relevant" Trent 900 engines within two flight cycles.

On 3 December 2010, the ATSB issued a preliminary report that contained a key finding of a manufacturing flaw: An area of fatigue cracking was found within a stub pipe that feeds oil to the engine HP/IP bearing structure. Bearing lubricating oil leaked from the crack, causing the subsequent engine fire and failure of the IPT disc. The fatigue fracture was a result of the misalignment of the stub pipe during the counter-boring process. That inaccurate alignment resulted in one side of the same stub pipe becoming too thin to resist fatigue fracturing. This "could lead to an elevated risk of fatigue crack initiation and growth, oil leakage, and potential catastrophic engine failure from a resulting oil fire," according to the agency.

The findings were determined to be a "critical safety issue", and the ATSB recommended immediate inspections of in-service Trent 900 engines. On 8 December, the ATSB reported that 45 Trent 900 engines had been inspected, and three of these engines had failed inspection and had been removed from service. On 18 May 2011, the ATSB released an interim factual report, which states that 53 Trent 900 engines were removed from service — 11 due to out-of-tolerance oil-feed stub pipes and 42 due to lack of measurement records relating to the oil-feed stub pipe.

The event highlighted the limitations of current alerting systems. The failure generated more than 80 ECAM alerts, whose treatment took over an hour to complete.

== Compensation and repairs ==
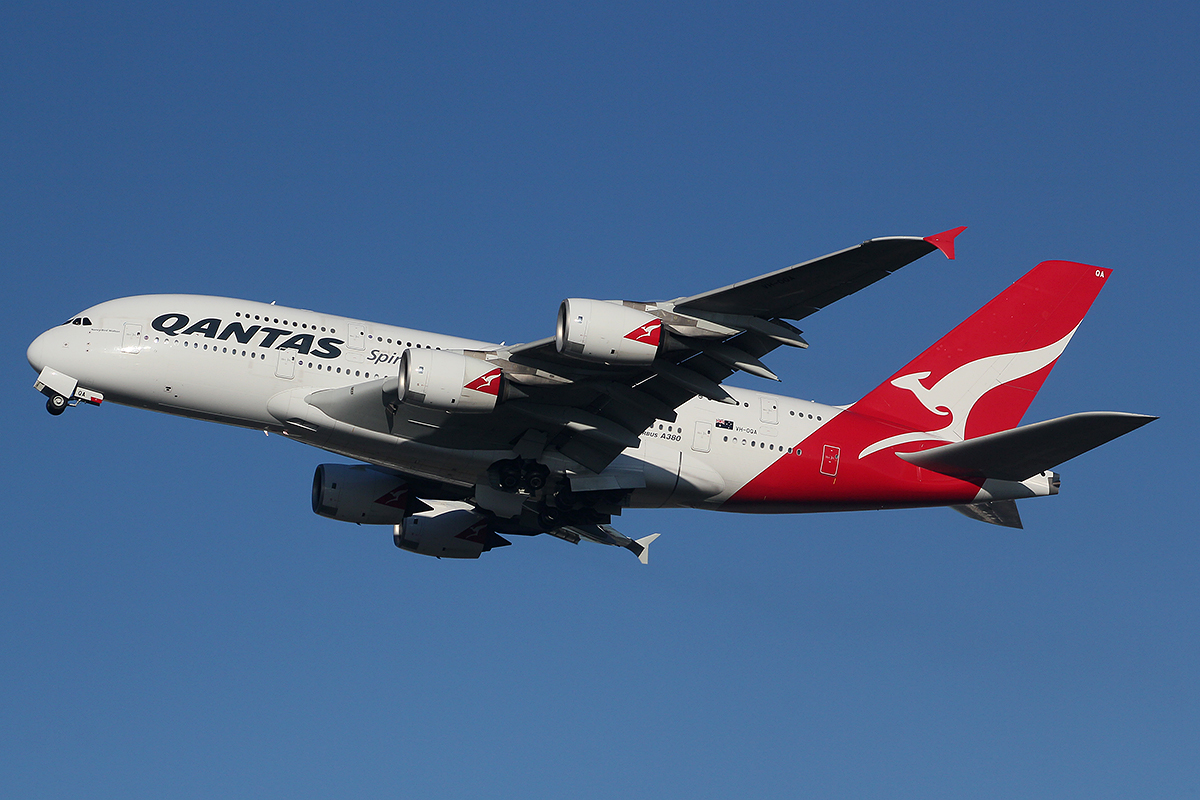
Airframe VH-OQA operating from London Heathrow in 2016

On 22 June 2011, Qantas announced that it had agreed to a compensation of AUD$95 million (£62 million/US$100 million) from Rolls-Royce. VH-OQA was repaired at an estimated cost of A$139 million (~US$145m). The aircraft has four new engines and a repaired left wing (including 6 km of wiring replaced), and had extensive on-ground testing and two test flights. It returned to Australia on 22 April, and returned to service on 28 April 2012. The repairs added roughly 94 kilograms (207 lb) to the gross weight of the aircraft.

=== Airworthiness directive ===
During repairs following the occurrence, cracks were discovered in the wings of the aircraft. As a result of the discovery, an airworthiness directive was issued affecting 20 A380-841, A380-842 and A380-861 aircraft that had accumulated over 1,300 hours flight. Those aircraft with under 1,800 hours flight were to be inspected within 6 weeks or 84 flights (whichever occurred first), while those with more than 1,800 hours flight were to be examined within four days or 14 flights. On 8 February 2012, the checks were extended to cover all 68 A380 aircraft in operation.

== Dramatisations and books ==
The events of Qantas 32 were featured in "Titanic in the Sky" (Season 13, Episode 10) in the Canadian TV series Mayday. Two books about the incident by Richard de Crespigny (captain of the flight) were published in 2012 and 2018. A drama documentary in the British TV series Terror at 30,000 Feet (Season 1, Episode 2), featuring interviews with the pilots, crew, and passengers, was made by Raw Cut Productions Ltd for Channel 5, produced by Fiona Turnlock, and aired on 26 July 2024 on Channel 5.

== See also ==
Other accidents involving engine failure:

- Air France Flight 66
- United Airlines Flight 232
- American Airlines Flight 383
- Southwest Airlines Flight 1380
- United Airlines Flight 328
