= Percy Champion =

English footballer

Personal information
- Full name: Percy Arthur Gordon Champion
- Date of birth: March 1887
- Place of birth: Lewes, England
- Date of death: 1957 (aged 69–70)
- Position: Outside left

Senior career*
Years	Team	Apps	(Gls)
- Woking
1912–1913	Fulham	2	(0)
- * Club domestic league appearances and goals

Percy Arthur Gordon Champion (March 1887 – 1957) was an English professional footballer who played as an outside left in the Football League for Fulham.

== Personal life ==
Champion served for 12 years in the East Lancashire Regiment prior to the First World War. Two years after the outbreak of the war, he re-enlisted in the Royal Army Service Corps in July 1916. He saw action in Salonika and was promoted to sergeant in August 1917. At the time malaria and gastritis led to Champion's discharge from the army in November 1919, he was holding the rank of company sergeant major.

== Career statistics ==
Appearances and goals by club, season and competition
Club	Season	League			FA Cup		Total	
Club	Season	Division	Apps	Goals	Apps	Goals	Apps	Goals
Fulham	1912–13	Second Division	1	0	0	0	1	0
Fulham	1913–14	Second Division	1	0	0	0	1	0
Career Total			1	0	0	0	1	0
