= Frederick Champion de Crespigny =

English clergyman and cricketer

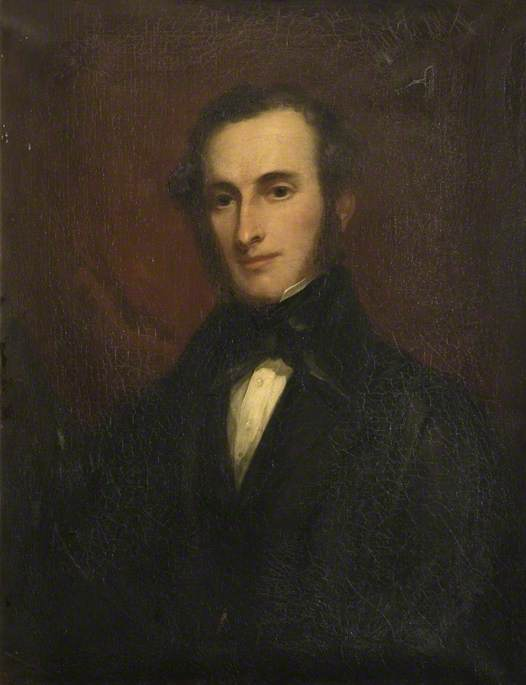
- Born: Frederick John Champion de Crespigny; 12 December 1822; Theydon Mount, Epping, Essex
- Died: 25 June 1887 (aged 64); London, England
- Education: Magdalene College, Cambridge
- Spouse: Rosabelle Tompson Wythe
- Parent(s): Augustus James Champion de Crespigny; Caroline Smijth
- Relatives: Sir Claude Champion de Crespigny, 3rd Baronet (brother)

Frederick John Champion de Crespigny (12 December 1822 – 25 June 1887) was a vicar of Hampton Wick and first-class cricketer who played between 1843 and 1851 for Nottinghamshire. His involvement in ecclesiastical and secular affairs has tremendously contributed to the flourishing of the village.

== Early life ==
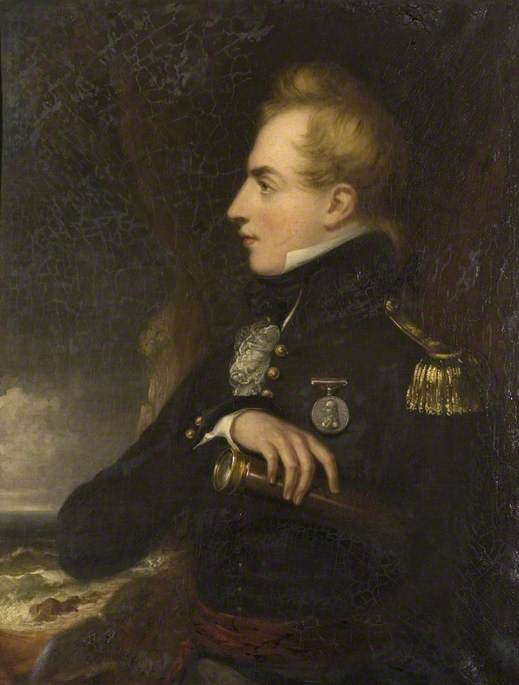
Portrait of his father, Augustus James Champion de Crespigny

Champion de Crespigny was born on 12 December 1822 at Hill Hall in Theydon Mount, near Epping, Essex. He was the third son of Augustus James Champion de Crespigny (1791–1825), and Caroline Smijth, daughter of Sir William Smijth, 7th Baronet. His father was an officer in the Royal Navy who died from yellow fever on board HMS Scylla in 1825. His grandfather was Sir William Champion de Crespigny, 2nd Baronet and his elder brother was Sir Claude Champion de Crespigny, 3rd Baronet.

He was educated at Magdalene College, Cambridge.

== Career ==
After graduating, de Crespigny became a Church of England priest and was perpetual curate at Emmanuel Church, Camberwell, from 1850 to 1858. He was then appointed vicar of Saint John the Baptist Church in Hampton Wick from 1858 until his death.

At the age of 40, de Crespigny was elected Clerk of the Hampton Wick Local Board shortly after its creation in 1863. He had been considered for the position of Chairman until Sir Thomas James Nelson JP, Solicitor to the Board, elected at his place Philip May, Proprietor of Houses, to avoid a conflict of interest with the Parish.

True to his passion for cricket, de Crespigny founded and presided the Hampton Wick Royal Cricket Club in Bushy Park in 1863. Incidentally, he was a supporter and chaplain of the local lodge of Freemasons and the Kingston Division of the Fifth Surrey Rifle Volunteers.

== Personal life ==
On 18 August 1857, he married Rosabelle Mary (née Tompson) Wythe in Boxted. The widow of Thomas Mallet Wythe, Esq., she was the only daughter of late E. Thompson, Esq., of Yarmouth. They had no children.

De Crespigny resided at a Gothic Revival Vicarage formerly located on Park Road, directly across from the Hampton Wick entrance to Bushy Park at Cobbler's Walk. It has since been demolished.

He died on 25 June 1887 in London at the age of 64.
