= Richard de Crespigny =

Retired Australian commercial airline pilot

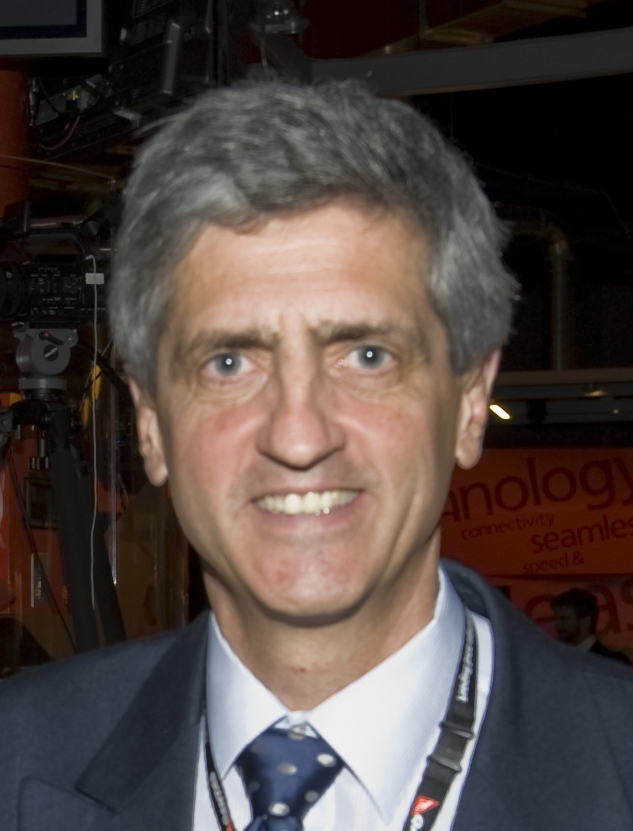
- De Crespigny in 2011
- Born: 31 May 1957 (age 69); Melbourne, Australia
- Occupation: Pilot
- Known for: Pilot-in-Command of Qantas Flight 32
- Family: Hugh Champion de Crespigny (great-uncle)
- Awards: Order of Australia
- Military career
- Allegiance: Australia
- Branch: RAAF
- Service years: 1975–1986
- Rank: Flight Lieutenant

Richard Champion de Crespigny AM (/ˈkrɛp.niː/ KREP-nee) (born 31 May 1957) is an Australian pilot, who was pilot-in-command of Qantas Flight 32 in November 2010 when the Airbus A380 suffered an uncontained engine failure shortly after taking off from Singapore. Despite the failure causing severe damage to the aircraft, triggering dozens of ECAM warnings, and puncturing the fuel tanks, the crew landed the plane at Changi Airport in Singapore.

Passengers, the media, and the Australian Transport Safety Bureau praised de Crespigny for his handling of the emergency, and in 2016 he was awarded the Order of Australia for his contributions to aviation safety. He wrote two books: QF32, detailing the flight and its aftermath, and FLY! – the Elements of Resilience.

== Family ==
De Crespigny's family includes great-uncles Air Vice Marshal Hugh Vivian Champion de Crespigny and his brother Air Commodore Claude Champion de Crespigny. His uncle was Squadron Leader Humphrey Champion de Crespigny of the Royal Australian Air Force. His father Peter Champion de Crespigny joined the RAAF, then Australian National Airways as an administrator. Peter later gained a pilot licence.

His cousin is mining magnate Robert Champion de Crespigny.

== Military career ==
De Crespigny decided he wanted to become a pilot after touring Point Cook Air Base in Victoria when he was 14. He went on to join the Royal Australian Air Force at age 17 in 1975. During his first training flight the instructor encouraged him to put the plane into a stall/spin, after which he left de Crespigny to stop the plane from plummeting to the ground alone. The incident left him terrified but heightened his awareness of the dangers of complacency and human error in flight. In 1982 he was posted to the Air Force VIP jets for a short time, but soon he became certified as a helicopter pilot and was deployed to El Gorah, Egypt. While he was accepted into training to fly the F-111, he never went on to become a fighter pilot.

== Civil aviation ==
Shortly after leaving the military for Qantas in 1986, he took a break from flying to establish Aeronaut Industries Pty Ltd (a computer software company) due to a recession in the aviation industry reducing the number of jobs available for pilots. During this period he did complete an annual flight check during the two-year break. Not long after returning to Qantas full time he converted to flying the Boeing 747-400, having previously been a pilot of the Boeing 747-200 and Boeing 747-300. In 2004 he switched to flying the Airbus A330, and in 2008 he was certified to fly the Airbus A380. He retired from commercial flying in 2020 due to the ongoing COVID-19 restrictions and low demand for international travel.

=== Qantas Flight 32 ===
On 4 November 2010 de Crespigny was serving as pilot-in-command of Qantas Flight 32 while also undergoing a route check. The Airbus A380 under his command suffered an uncontained engine failure several minutes after leaving Singapore Changi Airport. Despite facing over 50 ECAM warning checklists and having limited use of many critical systems on the aircraft, including brakes, hydraulics, and electronics, the crew managed to bring the plane back to the airport and make an emergency landing. After the landing engine number ''one'' had to be forcefully shut down by firefighting foam before passengers could disembark safely since it was not responding to inputs by the flight controls, and the pressurized water failed to shut it down. Once in the airport terminal, he reassured the passengers and answered questions. While a passenger on a 747 flight home, he experienced another engine failure, albeit much less severe, that forced the plane to turn around and left him in Singapore for a few more days.

== Books ==
- De Crespigny, Richard (2012). QF32. Sydney: Pan Macmillan. ISBN 9781742611174.
- De Crespigny, Richard (2018). Fly! – the Elements of Resilience. [Camberwell, Victoria]: Viking, an imprint of Penguin Books. ISBN 978-0670078738.

== See also ==
- Chesley Sullenberger
- Alfred Clair Haynes
- Tammie Jo Shults
