= Electronic centralised aircraft monitor =

Avionics system developed by Airbus

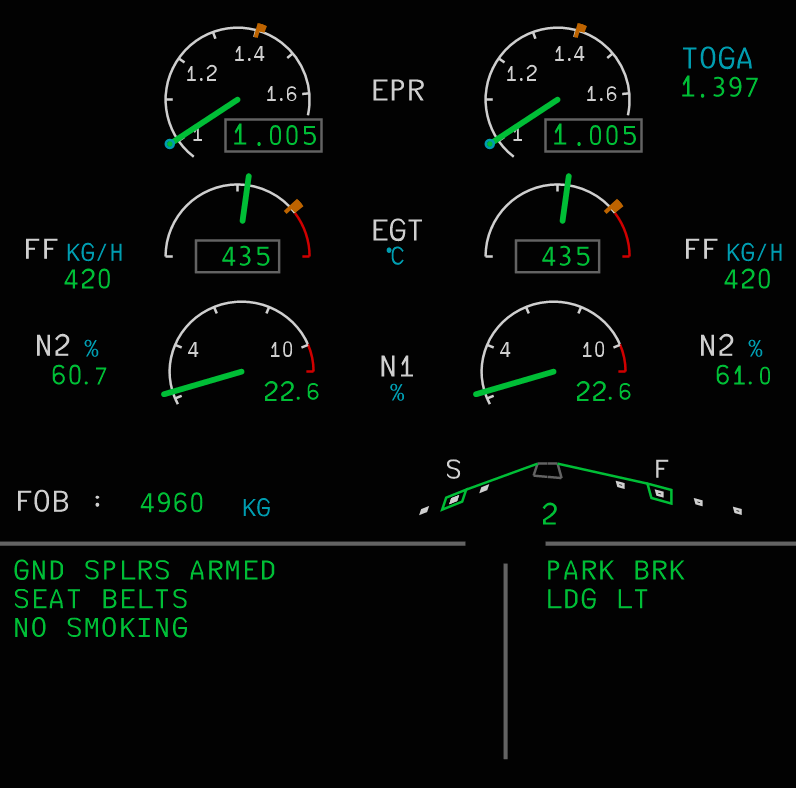
Upper ECAM on an Airbus A320, IAE V2500 version

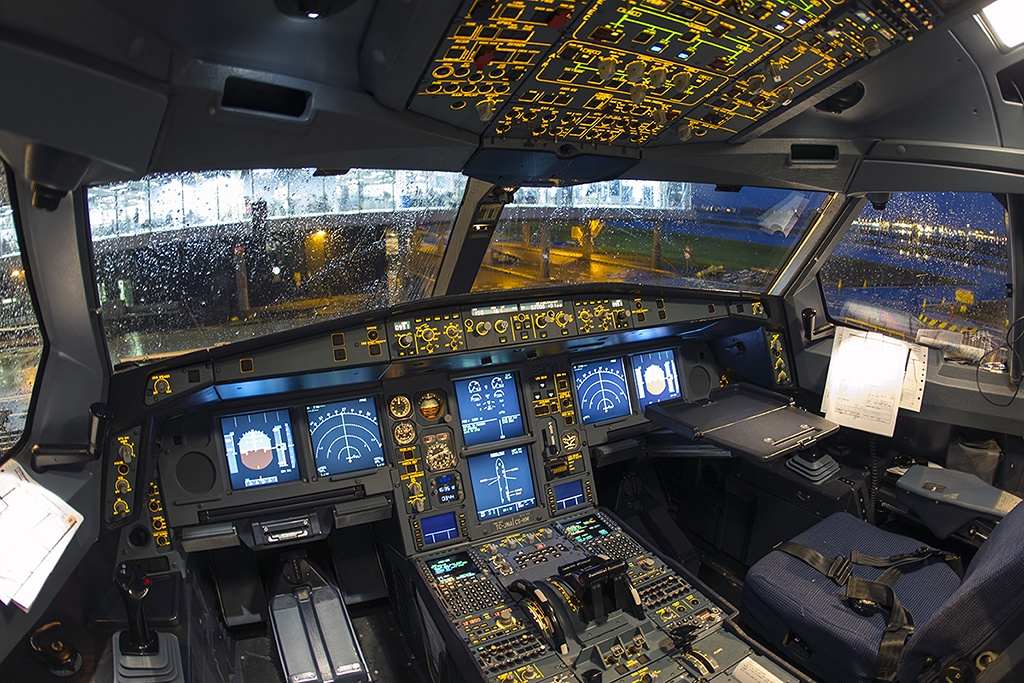
ECAM on an Airbus A330 at the center

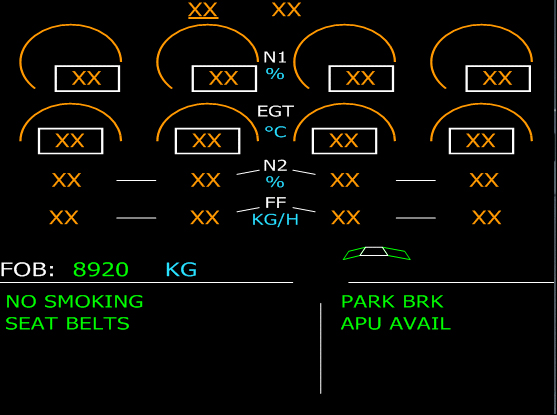
Upper ECAM on an Airbus A340.

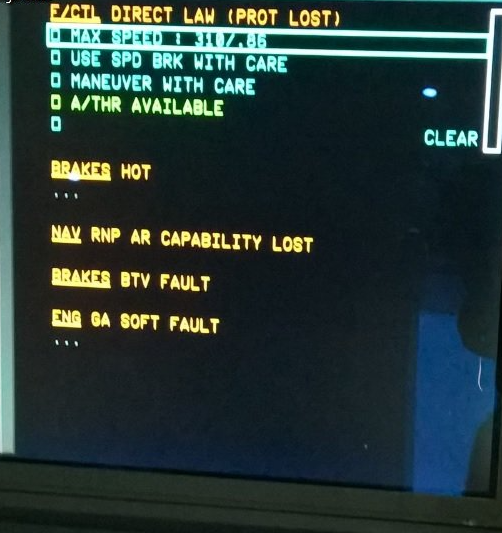
Airbus A350 Warning Display

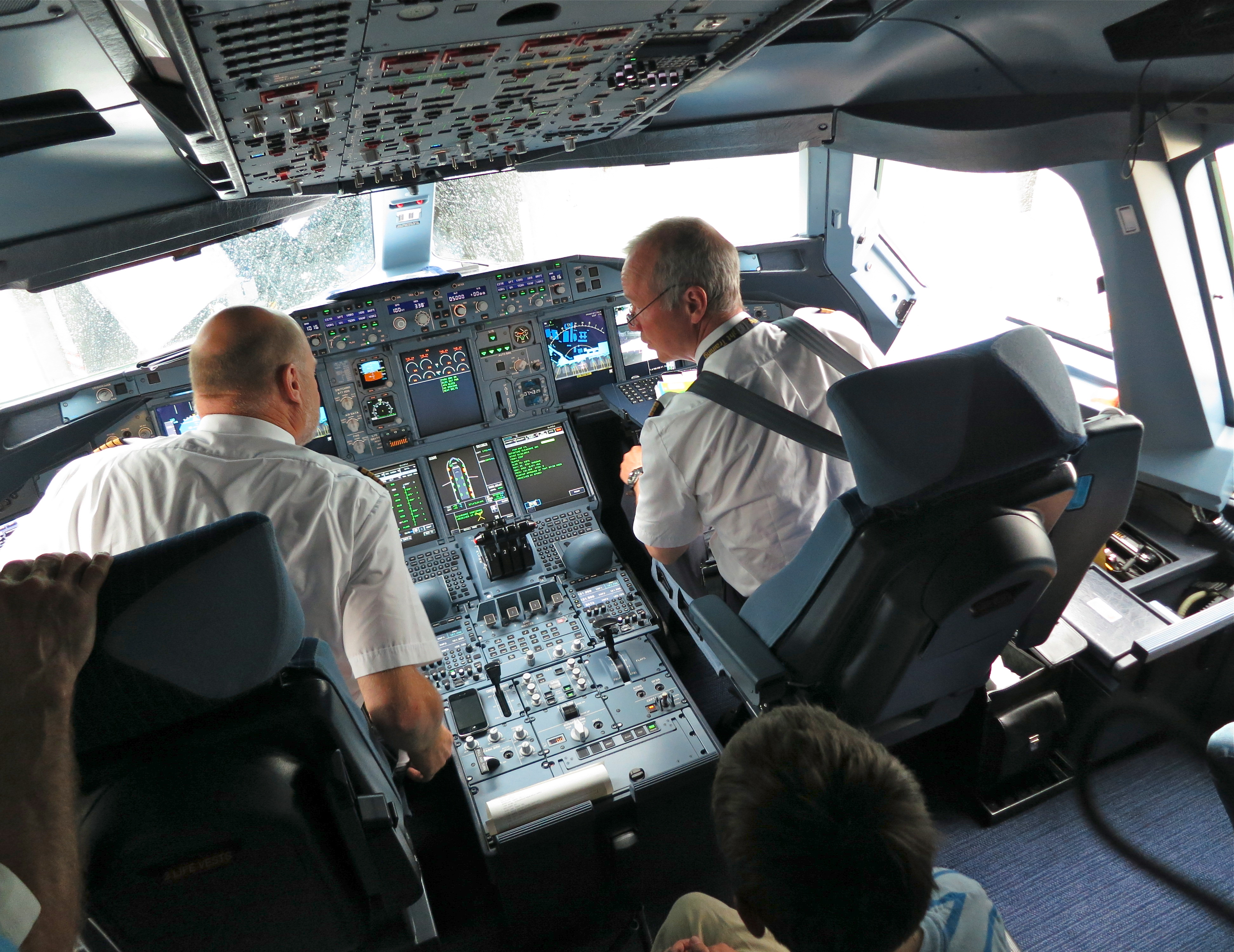
ECAM on an Airbus A380 at the center

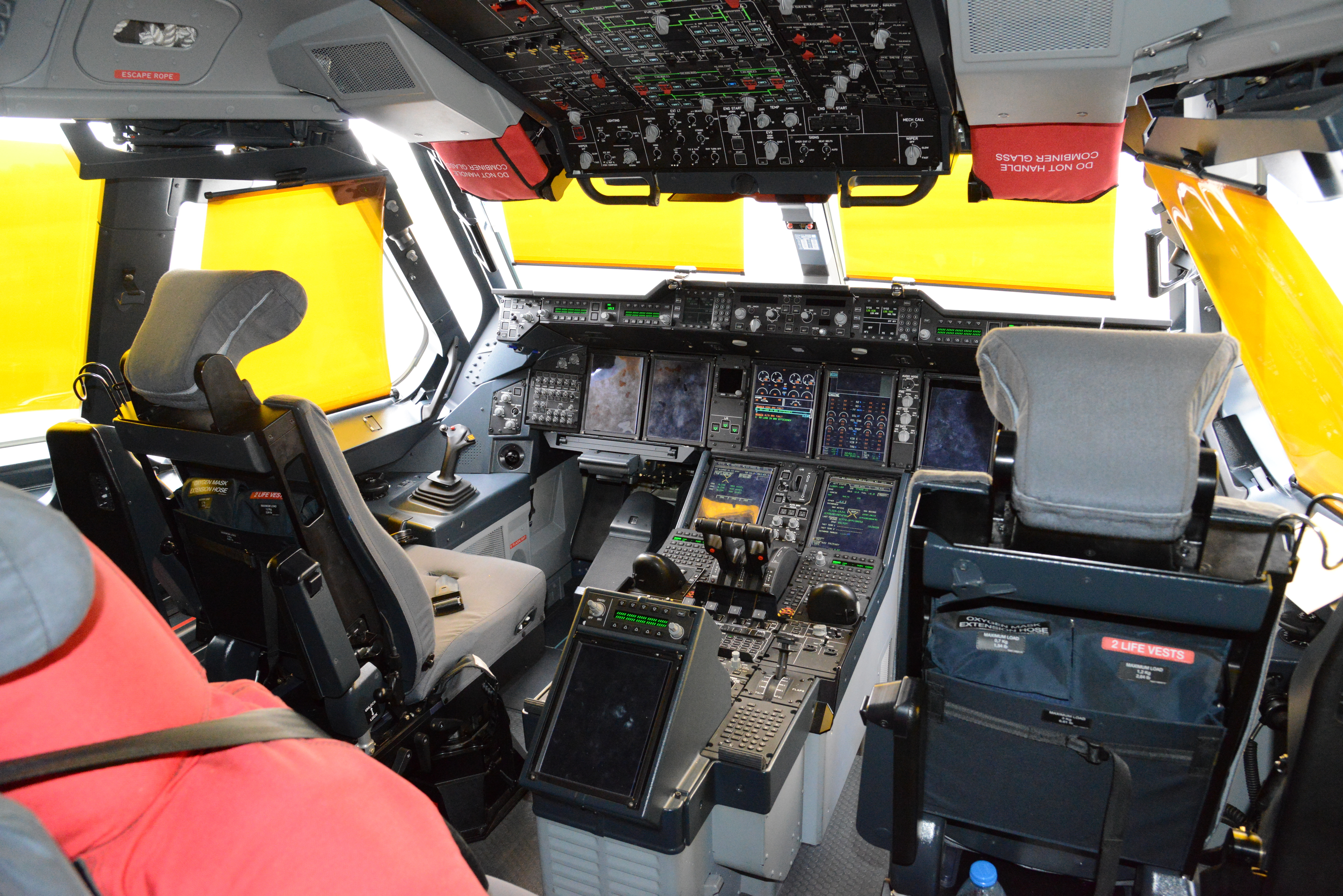
ECAM on an Airbus A400M at the center

An electronic centralized aircraft monitoring or (ECAM) is a system on Airbus aircraft that monitors aircraft functions and relays them to the pilots. It also produces messages detailing failures and in certain cases, lists procedures to undertake to correct the problem.

== History ==
ECAM is similar to other systems, known as Engine Indicating and Crew Alerting System (EICAS), used by Boeing, Bombardier, COMAC, Dornier, Embraer, Saab, and Xi'an, Centralized Fault Detection System (CFDS) on McDonnell Douglas, or Engine Warning Display (EWD) on ATR, which display data concerning aircraft systems and also failures. Airbus developed ECAM, such that it not only provided the features of EICAS, but also displayed corrective action to be taken by the pilot, as well as system limitations after the failures. Using a colour-coded scheme the pilots can instantly assess the situation and decide on the actions to be taken. It was designed to ease pilot stress in abnormal and emergency situations, by designing a paperless cockpit in which all the procedures are instantly available.

== System design ==
ECAM is a series of systems designed to work in unison to display information to the pilots in a quick and effective manner. Sensors placed throughout the aircraft, monitoring key parameters, feed their data into two System Data Acquisition Concentrator (SDACs) which in turn process the data and feed it to two Flight Warning Computers (FWCs). The FWCs check for discrepancies in the data and then display the data on the ECAM displays through the three Display Management Computers (DMCs). In the event of a fault the FWCs generate the appropriate warning messages and sounds. More vital systems are routed directly through the FWCs such that failures in them can still be detected even with the loss of both SDACs. The whole system can continue to operate even with a failure of one SDAC and one FWC.

Failures are classed by importance ranging from level 1 failures to level 3 failures. In the event of simultaneous failures the most critical failure is displayed first. The warning hierarchy is as follows:

- Level 3 Failures: red warnings, situations that require immediate crew action and that place the flight in danger. For example, an engine fire or loss of cabin pressure. They are enunciated with a red master warning light, a warning (red) ECAM message and a continuous repetitive chime or a specific sound or a synthetic voice. The chime can be silenced by pressing the master warning push button.
- Level 2 Failures: amber cautions, failures that require crew attention but not immediate action. For example, air bleed failure or fuel fault. They have no direct consequence to flight safety and are shown to the crew through an amber master caution light, a caution (amber) ECAM message and a single chime.
- Level 1 Failures: Cautions, failures and faults that lead to a loss of system redundancy, they require monitoring but present no hazard. Examples include the loss of DMC3 when not in use. Level 1 failures are enunciated by a caution (amber) ECAM message only (no aural warning).

In addition to the three failure levels are following status messages:

- Advisory: System parameters' monitoring. It causes an automatic call of the relevant system page on the system display (S/D). The affected parameter pulses green.
- MEMO: Information: Recalls normal or automatic selection of functions which are temporarily used. It causes a green, amber, or magenta message on engine warning display (E/WD).

== Alternative systems ==
Some alternatives are:

- Engine Indicating and Crew Alerting System (EICAS) on Boeing, Bombardier, Dornier, Embraer and Saab
- Centralized Fault Detection System (CFDS) on McDonnell Douglas
- Flight Warning System (FWS) on Fokker
- Engine Warning Display (EWD) on ATR
- Комплексная система экранной индикации и сигнализации (КСЭИС) (Integrated on-screen display and signaling system) on Antonov.

== Presence ==
Airbus-developed jetliners have ECAM since the A300-600 and A310.

The Airbus A220 has EICAS, as it was originally a Bombardier product.

== Limitations ==
The Qantas Flight 32 engine failure generated more than 80 ECAM alerts, whose treatment took over an hour to complete.

The A350 and A380 are the only Airbus-developed jetliners with fully integrated checklists.

== See also ==
- Glass cockpit
- Electronic flight instrument system
