= Mary Pakington =

English playwright and actor

The Honourable Mary Augusta Pakington MBE (1878 – 1949) was an English playwright and actress and daughter of the Third Baron Hampton.

== Early life ==
Pakington was born on 21 June 1878, the daughter of the Third Baron Hampton, Herbert Perrott Murray Pakington (1848–1906). She was the eldest sister of the Fourth Baron, Lord Hampton (Herbert Stuart Pakington), and Humphrey Arthur Pakington, an authority on architecture. The Hampton residence was at Waresley Court, Kidderminster.

== Career ==
Pakington wrote and acted in her 1913 comedy sketch The Old Clock on the Stairs. She wrote a number of one act plays. The House with Twisty Windows was set in Petrograd during the Red Terror. It was performed by the Lena Ashwell Players. Five of her one act plays were written as plays for Scout entertainment: One Good Turn Deserves Another, Jane or The Scout's Nightmare, The Laurel Crown, Mixed Pickles and The N'th Scout Law. She also wrote three act plays. The Tower was produced in London in 1929. In 1937 Pakington and Olive Walter wrote a three act play Wuthering Heights, based on Emily Brontë's novel, which was performed at The Strand by the 1930 Players. Pakington and Walter were both associated with the professional company the Greater London Players.

She wrote one historical pageant The Queen of Hearts in which Queen Elizabeth I visited Hartlebury Castle.

She was a judge of one act plays at the British Drama League's Community Drama Festival in Wolverhampton.

== Honours and awards ==
From 1915 to 1919 Pakington was a British Red Cross Society Volunteer in Worcestershire doing nursing and general hospital work. She was awarded an MBE in the 1920 New Years Honours list as the Honorary Secretary, Worcestershire Women's County Agricultural Committee. During World War II she served in the BBC and Civil Defence.

Pakington, who was unmarried, died on 25 September 1949.

== Selected works ==
=== Plays and Pageants ===
- A Doctor's Engagements (1903)
- Ready (1910)
- The Old Clock on the Stairs (1913)
- The Patriot (1914)
- Shakespeare for Merrie England (1915)
- Rosalind of the Farmyard (1920)
- One Good Turn Deserves Another (1920)
- Jane or The Scout's Nightmare (1920)
- The Laurel Crown (1920)
- Mixed Pickles (1920)
- The N'th Scout Law (1920)
- The Polar Post (1920)
- Two Christmas Plays (1923)
- The House with the Twisty Windows (1926)
- The Queen of Hearts (1926) - a pageant
- The True Likeness (1928)
- The Scarlett Mantle (1928)
- The Tower (1929)
- The Black Horseman (1929)
- All Camouflage: an episode of the war (1931)
- Tear up the Joker! (1931)
- Poet's Corner (1931)
- Experiment (1932)
- Wuthering Heights (1937)
- Nil Medium (1937)
- Blow, Bugle, Blow! (1941)
- Time and Mrs Podbury (1948)

=== Fiction ===
- The Village of Bentham, A Farewell Sermon and Caught by the Tide (1906)
- The Little Schoolmaster (1915)
