= John Pakington, 1st Baron Hampton =

British Conservative politician (1799–1880)

The Right Honourable The Lord Hampton GCB PC FRS
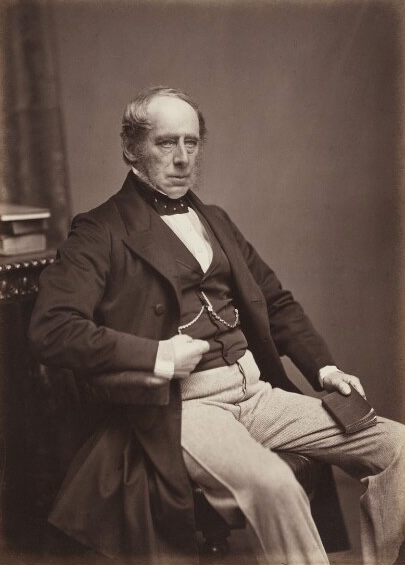
- The 1st Baron Hampton, c. 1867

Secretary of State for War and the Colonies
- In office 17 February 1852 – 17 December 1852
- Monarch: Queen Victoria
- Prime Minister: The Earl of Derby
- Preceded by: The Earl Grey
- Succeeded by: The Duke of Newcastle

Secretary of State for War
- In office 8 March 1867 – 1 December 1868
- Monarch: Queen Victoria
- Prime Minister: The Earl of Derby; Benjamin Disraeli
- Preceded by: Jonathan Peel
- Succeeded by: Edward Cardwell

Personal details
- Born: 20 February 1799
- Died: 9 April 1880 (aged 81) Eaton Square, London
- Party: Conservative
- Spouse(s): (1) Mary Slaney (d. 1843) (2) Augusta Murray (d. 1848) (3) Augusta de Crespigny
- Education: Oriel College, Oxford

John Somerset Pakington, 1st Baron Hampton, GCB, PC, FRS (20 February 1799 – 9 April 1880), known as Sir John Pakington, Bt, from 1846 to 1874, was a British Conservative politician.

== Background and education ==
Pakington was born John Somerset Russell, the son of William Russell (1750–1812) and Elizabeth Pakington, sister and heiress of Sir John Pakington, 8th Baronet. His birthplace was Slaughter's Court, Powick, Worcestershire. His father was a barrister and magistrate, the son of a surgeon of Worcester of the same name, and first cousin of William Oldnall Russell, and had first been married to Mary Cocks, with whom he had a daughter, Mary.

Pakington was left an orphan when his mother died in 1813: his half-sister Mary had married the Rev. Henry Barry Domvile in 1806 and, from 1811, Domvile had the living near Powick of Leigh with Bransford. Pakington was educated at Eton College and matriculated at Oriel College, Oxford in 1818.

Although a second son, John became the heir when his elder brother William Herbert Russell died in 1819, and he left Oxford without a degree. In 1827, he fought a duel over a matter concerning the Worcestershire Hunt. It took place at Kempsey, when he and John Parker, Master of the Hunt, fired at each other without injury.

In 1831, by royal licence, Russell assumed the surname of Pakington in lieu of his paternal surname, having inherited the estates of his maternal uncle, Sir John Pakington, in 1830. He held them jointly with the baronet's younger sister, Ann Pakington. The estate included Westwood House, Worcestershire, and Pakington moved there with his first wife, Mary, in 1832.

== Political career ==
Pakington had a family connection to Sir Compton Domvile, 1st Baronet, a Tory Member of Parliament in the 1820s and early 1830s, and the brother of Henry Barry Domvile who had married his half-sister Mary. He turned down the chance to stand as a reform candidate at the 1831 general election, instead speaking for the Tory Henry Beauchamp Lygon standing for Worcestershire. He was elected at the fourth attempt as the Tory Member of Parliament for Droitwich in 1837, a seat he held until 1874.

Pakington is considered a liberal conservative. He was first given office by Sir Robert Peel in 1841 and created in 1846 Baronet Pakington of the second creation, of Westwood in the County of Worcester.

=== 1850s and 1860s ===
Pakington served under Lord Derby's one-year administration, as Secretary of State for War and the Colonies in 1852. He announced the end of penal transportation to Van Diemen's Land, shortly to be known as Tasmania. He gave the green light to responsible government in New South Wales, which came about in 1855. Pressed by Charles Adderley, he granted New Zealand a constitution qualified by London's control of policy on indigenous peoples.

In opposition Pakington developed an interest in education reform. He was sworn of the Privy Council in 1852, and became a member of its Committee of Council on Education, which oversaw spending of public money on primary education. He introduced in 1855 an unsuccessful Education Bill which foreshadowed the Elementary Education Act 1870. As with Lord John Russell's previous effort, it foundered on the issue of Anglican schools that supposed nonconformist financial support.

With the Tories back in power, Pakington again held office under Lord Derby, as First Lord of the Admiralty from 1858 to 1859 and from 1866 to 1867. As First Lord he commissioned the first ironclad warship, HMS Warrior, launched in 1860. Following design work by John Scott Russell working with Baldwin Wake Walker, the time was ripe, given the French appointment of the naval architect Henri Dupuy de Lôme.

Under Derby and his successor, Benjamin Disraeli, Pakington was Secretary of State for War from 1867 to 1868. He was appointed a GCB in 1859. He chaired the Pakington Inquiry on education in 1865.

A butt of Derby's robust sense of humour, Pakington at a dinner in 1858 found himself being toasted by Derby who proposed "Sir John Pakington and the Wooden Spoons of Old England", the parliamentary wooden spoon being given to the Member who voted the fewest times in a session. Another anecdote had him late for a Cabinet meeting and excusing himself as having been "at Spithead", where naval reviews were held. Derby replied with a sarcastic pun on swell, meaning dandy as well as a form of wave.

=== 1870s ===
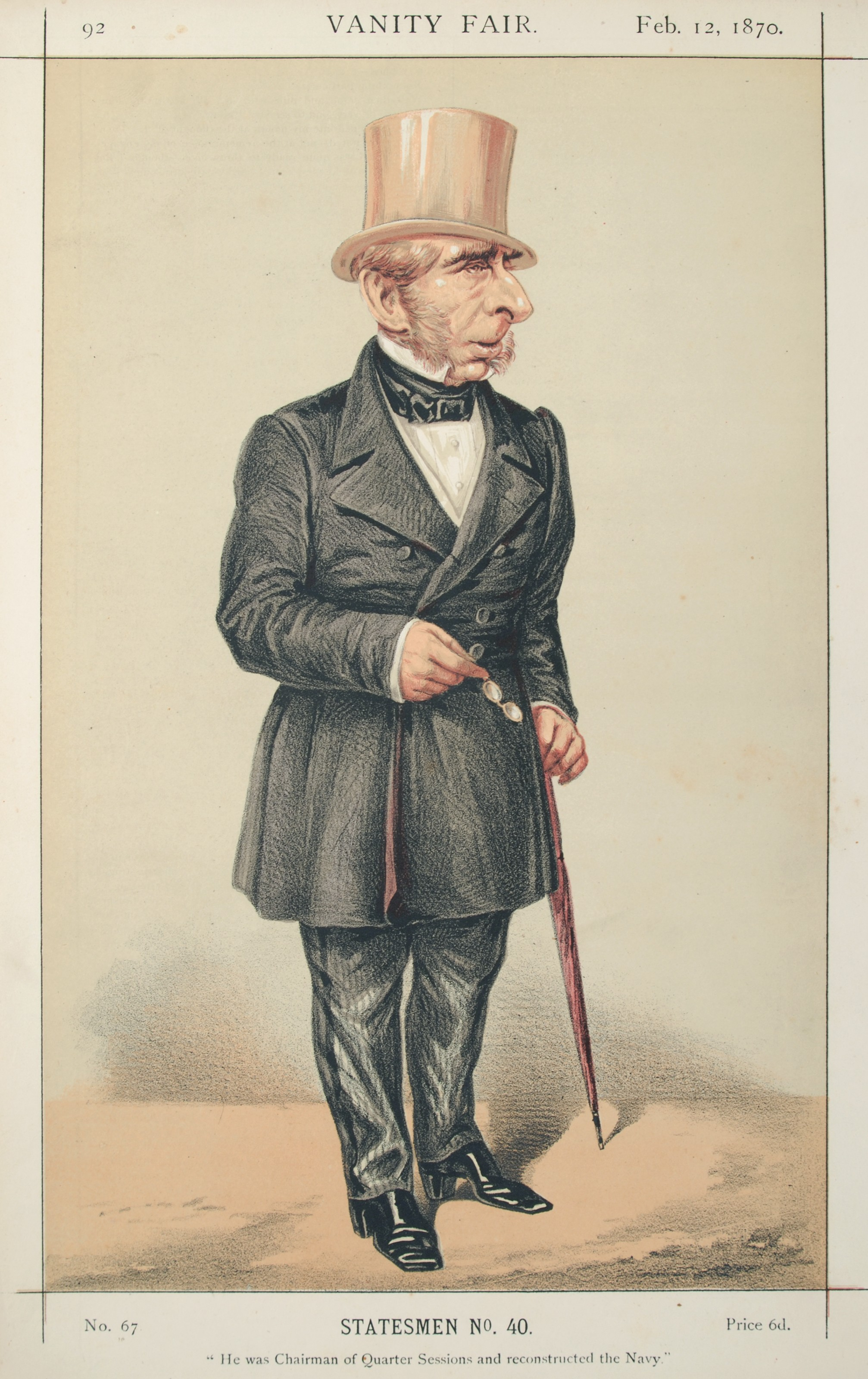
Pakington caricatured by "ATn" in Vanity Fair, 1870

In 1871 Pakington addressed the Social Science Congress, speaking on the "New Social Alliance", with which Disraeli was toying. The term referred to discussions being held between Conservative Party leaders and workers' representatives. They aroused hostility from Tory backbenchers; and George Charles Brodrick called it a "semi-communistic programme". Pakington had joined the ephemeral movement of John Scott Russell, signing with Stafford Northcote, Gathorne Hardy and some of the House of Lords a memorandum on social reform measures to be taken, the "seven points". In October, in an article "The New Social Movement", the Saturday Review commented:

The pompous announcement of an alliance between the aristocracy and the artisans bears traces of Mr. Disraeli's earlier manner; but a serious belief in the practicability in the present day of a limited and regulated socialism is only worthy of Sir John Pakington or of Lord John Manners. When Coningsby and Sybil were published, there had been no insurrection of a Paris Commune, nor had Mr. Mill and the Land and Labour League attacked directly or indirectly the right of property in land.

Pakington, by now unpopular with Tory leaders, lost his seat in the Commons in the 1874 general election, defeated on a large swing from 1868 by John Corbett, a local Liberal. He was raised to the peerage as Baron Hampton, of Hampton Lovett and of Westwood in the County of Worcester.

== Other public appointments ==
Hampton served for many years as chairman of the Worcestershire Quarter Sessions. He was elected a Fellow of the Royal Society in June 1858. He was also President of the Royal Statistical Society from 1861 to 1863 and Chief Civil Service Commissioner from 1875 until his death. He was also the president of the Institution of Naval Architects from its inception in 1860 until months before his death.

== Death ==
Lord Hampton died at his London home in April 1880, aged 81, and was succeeded by his son from his first marriage, John Slaney Pakington.

== Family ==
He was three times married:

- Firstly, in 1822 as John Somerset Russell, to Mary Slaney, daughter of Moreton Aglionby Slaney; she died in 1843.
- Secondly, in 1844, to Augusta, daughter of the Right Reverend George Murray; she died in 1848.
- Thirdly, in 1851, to Augusta Anne, daughter of Thomas Champion Crespigny MP, and widow of Thomas Henry Hastings Davies MP.

His son John Slaney Pakington (born 1826) by the first marriage became the 2nd Baron Hampton; he had a son Herbert Perrott Murray Pakington (born 1846) by the second marriage, who became the 3rd Baron Hampton, and was father of Herbert Stuart Pakington who on his death in 1906 became the 4th Baron. There were no children of the third marriage.

== Bibliography ==
- Obituary New York Times 10 April 1880
- The peerage of the British empire as at present existing. Page 31 Google Books

Parliament of the United Kingdom
Preceded by John Barneby	Member of Parliament for Droitwich; 1837–1874	Succeeded by John Corbett
Political offices
Preceded by The Earl Grey	Secretary of State for War and the Colonies; 1852	Succeeded by The Duke of Newcastle
Preceded by Sir Charles Wood, Bt	First Lord of the Admiralty; 1858–1859	Succeeded by The Duke of Somerset
Preceded by The Duke of Somerset	First Lord of the Admiralty; 1866–1867	Succeeded by Henry Lowry-Corry
Preceded by Jonathan Peel	Secretary of State for War; 1867–1868	Succeeded by Edward Cardwell
Government offices
Preceded by Sir Edward Ryan	First Civil Service Commissioner; 1875–1880	Succeeded by The Earl of Strafford
Peerage of the United Kingdom
New creation	Baron Hampton; 1874–1880	Succeeded by John Pakington
Baronetage of the United Kingdom
New creation	Baronet (of Westwood); 1846–1880	Succeeded by John Pakington
