= Thomas Wythe (cricketer) =

English cricketer

Thomas Mallett Wythe (1814 – 1854) was a Nineteenth-century cricketer from England. A batsman of unknown handedness, he played ten first-class cricket matches for the Marylebone Cricket Club between 1839 and 1841. He also spent time playing for invitational XIs in Cambridge and for Lincoln's Inn, one of the Inns of Court in London. He died aged 40, in Colchester, Essex.
