= George Champion (cricketer) =

English cricketer

Personal information
- Full name: George Ernest Champion
- Born: 15 July 1867; Stockbury, Kent
- Died: 30 September 1933 (aged 66); Linton, Kent
- Batting: Right-handed
- Bowling: Right-arm medium

Domestic team information
- Years: Team
- 1892: Kent
- Only FC: 20 June 1892 Kent v Somerset
- Source: CricInfo, 21 December 2020

George Ernest Champion (15 July 1867 – 30 September 1933) was an English amateur cricketer. He was a right-handed batsman who played one first-class cricket match for Kent County Cricket Club in 1892. He was born at Stockbury in Kent, the son of Joseph and Jane Champion, and educated at Southborough. His father was a farmer and land developer, and Champion followed him into business, farming at Linton, Kent.

Champion played in a minor Gentlemen of Kent v Players of Kent match in May 1892, scoring six runs and 29 runs when opening the batting in the first and second innings respectively. His only first-class appearance came the following month against Somerset at Catford in the 1892 County Championship. He failed to score a run in either innings. He played club cricket for The Mote and Linton Park in Kent.

Champion married Audrey Benning in 1902; the couple had two children. He died at Redwall Farm at Linton in 1933 aged 66.

== Bibliography ==
- Carlaw, Derek (2020). Kent County Cricketers, A to Z: Part One (1806–1914) (PDF). Cardiff: ACS.
