= Rose Champion de Crespigny =

English artist and author (1859–1935)

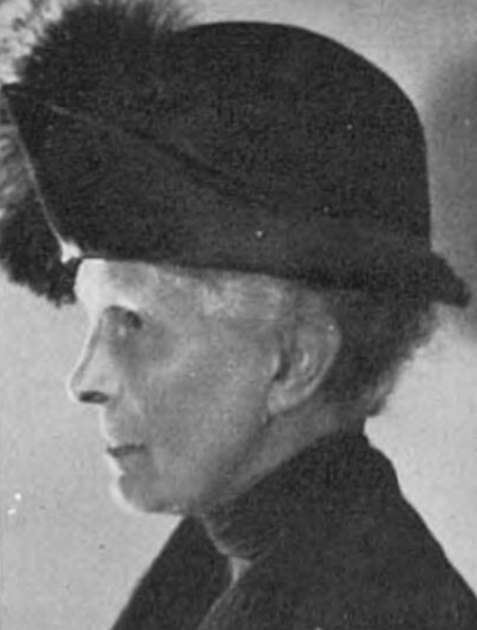
- Rose Champion de Crespigny, artist and spiritualist. From “Is there a Scientific Basis for Spiritualism?” ‘The Sphere’. 27 August 1927.
- Born: Annie Rose Charlotte Key; 9 November 1859
- Died: 10 February 1935 (aged 75)
- Known for: Painting, Writing
- Spouse: Philip Augustus Champion de Crespigny (m. 1878)

Rose Champion de Crespigny (born Annie Rose Charlotte Key; 9 November 1859 – 10 February 1935) was an English artist and author, who published many novels as Mrs Philip Champion de Crespigny.

== Career ==
Rose was the daughter of Admiral Sir Astley Cooper Key (who later changed the surname to Cooper-Key) and his wife, Lady Charlotte Lavinia (née McNeil). She was born 9 November 1859 in Kensington, and she was baptised 15 December 1859 at St John's, Notting Hill.

As an artist, her paintings tended toward landscape. Her writing, after early forays into genealogical and local history, soon settled into popular fiction. Her work was described in a contemporary review as having "a certain graceful facility". She was a leading member of the Ridley Art Club and the Lyceum Club in Piccadilly. She was honorary principal of the British College of Psychic Science and a spiritualist.

== Personal life ==
Rose married Philip Augustus Champion de Crespigny (1850-1912), a Royal Navy officer and son of Sir Claude William Champion de Crespigny, 3rd Baronet, on 1 October 1878 in Westminster. They had four children, including Frederick Philip Champion de Crespigny (1884–1947), who inherited the baronetcy, as the 7th Baronet, the year before his death.

== Selected publications ==
- Key to the Roll of the Huguenots Settled in the United Kingdom (1884)
- The Roll of the Highland Clans of Scotland (1889)
- The New Forest; its traditions, inhabitants and customs (1895)
- From Behind the Arras (1902)
- The Mischief of a Glove (1903)
- The Rose Brocade (1905)
- The Grey Domino (1906)
- The Spanish Prisoner (1907)
- My Cousin Cynthia, and Others (1908)
- The Coming of Aurora (1909)
- The Valley of Achor (1910)
- The Five of Spades (1912)
- The Mark (1912)
- Hester and I (1915)
- Stories of To-day and Yesterday (1917)
- The Moving Finger (1919)
- The Shears of Atropos (1919)
- The Villa on the Borderive Road (1919)
- The Witness in the Wood (1919)
- The Case of Mr. Fitzgordon (1919)
- The Voice (1919)
- The Mind of a Woman (1922)
- The Valley of Orchids (1923)
- Tangled Evidence (1924), filmed as Tangled Evidence (1934)
- The Missing Piece (1927)
- The Dark Sea (1927)
- Straws in the Wind (1928)
- The Eye of Nemesis (1931)
- Glimpses into Infinity (1931)
- A Case for the C.I.D. (1933)
- The Riddle of the Emeralds (1929)
- This World and Beyond (1934)
