= Claude Champion de Crespigny =

British soldier and polo player

Captain Claude Champion de Crespigny DSO
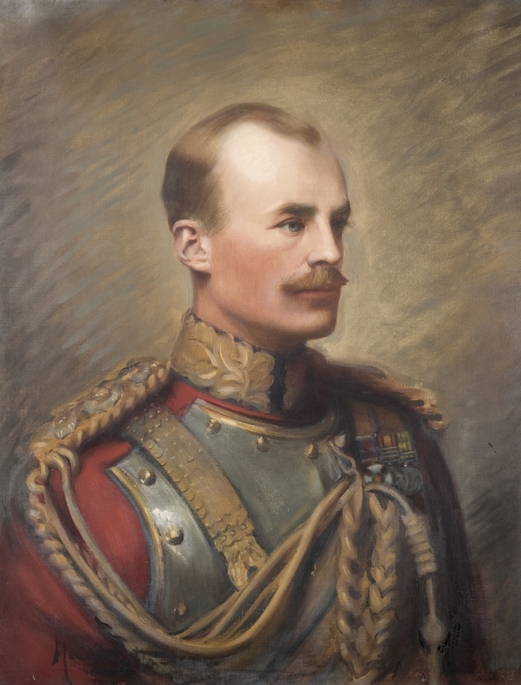
- Portrait of Capt Champion de Crespigny by Isobella M. Sutton
- Born: Claude Champion de Crespigny; 11 September 1873
- Died: 18 May 1910 (aged 36); King's Cliffe, Northamptonshire
- Education: Eton College
- Parent(s): Sir Claude Champion de Crespigny, 4th Baronet; Louisa Margaret McKerrall
- Relatives: Sir Claude Champion de Crespigny, 4th Baronet (father); Sir Claude Champion de Crespigny, 3rd Baronet (grandfather)

Captain Claude Champion de Crespigny, DSO (11 September 1873 – 18 May 1910) was a British soldier and polo player.

== Early life ==
He was the eldest, and heir apparent, of nine children born to the former Louisa Margaret McKerrall, and Sir Claude Champion de Crespigny, 4th Baronet (1847–1935), who went bankrupt in 1881.

His paternal grandparents were Sir Claude Champion de Crespigny, 3rd Baronet, the first-class cricketer and British Army officer, and the former Mary Tyrell (a daughter of Sir John Tyrell, 2nd Baronet). His paternal grandparents were Robert McKerrall, Emily Pauline Staveley.

Claude was educated at Eton.

== Career ==
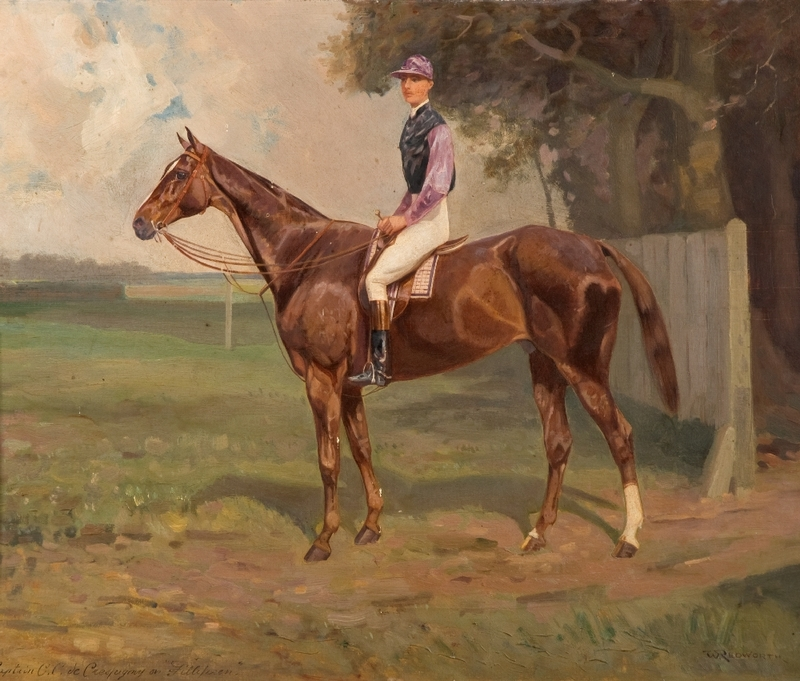
Captain Claude Champion de Crespigny on 'Fillipeen'.

He joined the British Army when he was commissioned a second lieutenant in the 2nd Life Guards on 3 July 1895, and was promoted to lieutenant on 5 August 1896.

He served in the Second Boer War in South Africa from 1899 to 1900, and was twice wounded in action and twice recommended for the Victoria Cross for acts of immense bravery. Though he never received this decoration, he was appointed a Companion of the Distinguished Service Order (DSO) for his services in South Africa in November 1900.

Following the war, he received the substantive rank of captain in his regiment on 12 January 1902, then was seconded in January 1903 to serve in West Africa with the Southern Nigeria Regiment.

He later became the aide-de-camp to the viceroy and governor-general of India George Curzon, 1st Marquess Curzon of Kedleston.

=== Sporting ===
Claude was a member of a very sporting family and was a successful polo player, he was selected for the Hurlingham Club team that traveled to compete in America in 1910. He won the Roehampton Cup in 1907 and 1908. It was said that he "can hunt like a hound, swim like a fish, run like a hare, and box like Jeffries."

== Personal life ==
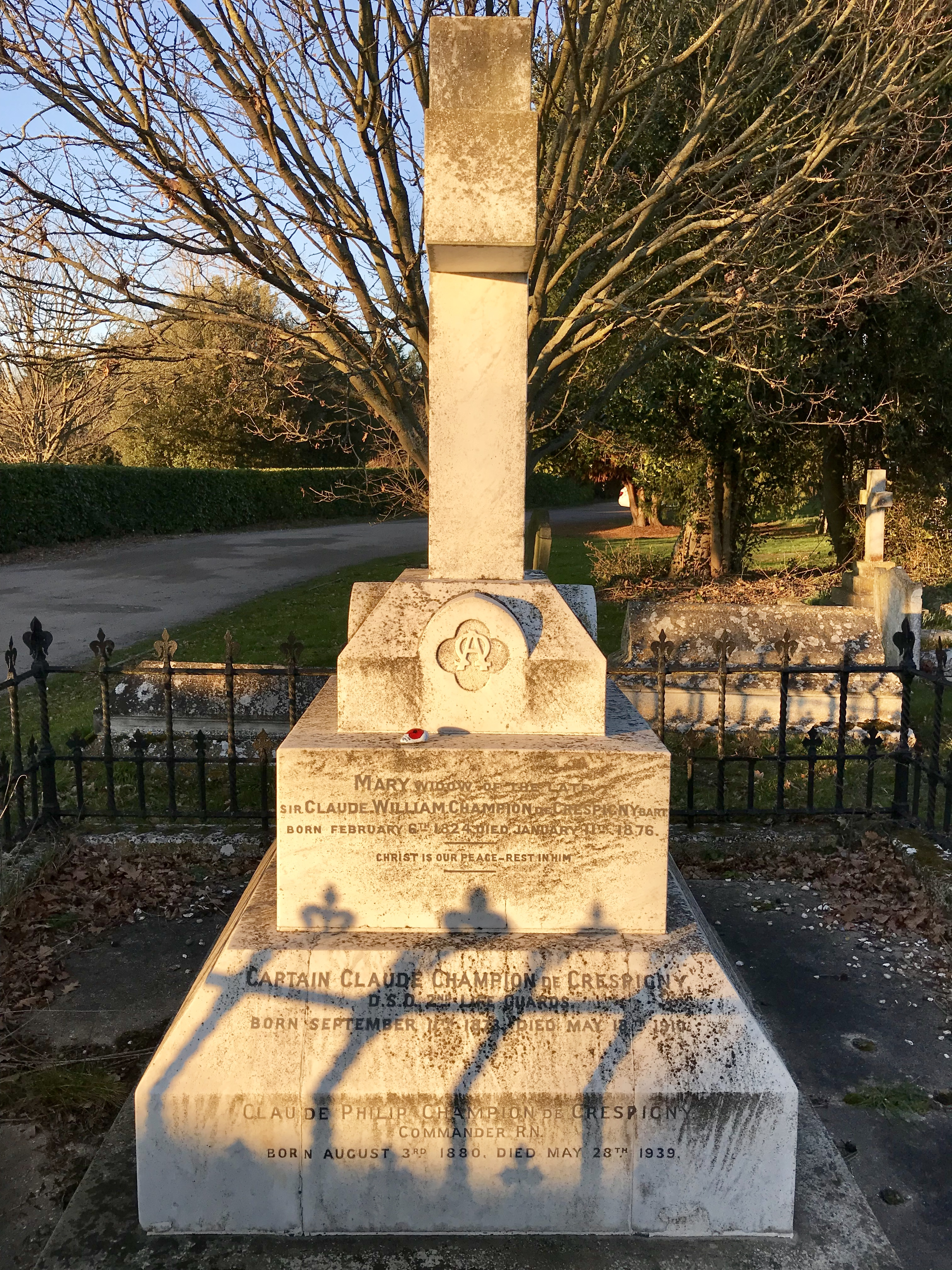
The grave of Claude Champion de Crespigny in the churchyard of St Andrew's, Hatfield Peverel, Essex

In 1904, Crespigny served as best man at the wedding of Herbert Spender-Clay (who attended Eton at the same time as Crespigny) to heiress Pauline Astor, the eldest daughter of William Waldorf Astor (later 1st Viscount Astor).

On 18 May 1910, he died by suicide age 37. He was found dead early in the morning by the roadside at King's Cliffe in Northamptonshire, with a gunshot wound to the head and a revolver with him. Claude had arrived at King's Cliffe from London the night before and upon his arrival, had "set out to walk in the direction of Apethorpe Hall, the residence of Leonard Brassey and Lady Violet Brassey, where he had been an occasional visitor." The physician and coroner concluded that a temporary madness may have been caused by recent case of severe influenza and concussions from repeated heavy falls whilst playing polo. His younger brother, Claude Raul, became the fifth Baronet upon their father's death in 1935. (Note: His youngest brother, Claude Philip Champion de Crespigny (1880–1939), was accused in 1929 of having used "undue influence" over the will and codicils of Princess Clara E. von Hatzfeldt-Wildenburg (née Clara Elizabeth Prentice), the adopted daughter of American financier Collis P. Huntington.)
