= Albert Champion (cricketer) =

English cricketer (1851–1909)

Personal information
- Full name: Albert Champion
- Born: 27 December 1851; Handsworth, Yorkshire, England
- Died: 26 June 1909 (aged 57); Wadsley Asylum, Yorkshire, England
- Batting: Left-handed
- Bowling: Right-arm medium

Domestic team information
- Years: Team
- 1876–1879: Yorkshire
- 1886: Lancashire

Career statistics
Competition	First-class
Matches	18
Runs scored	218
Batting average	8.07
100s/50s	–/–
Top score	29
Balls bowled	84
Wickets	1
Bowling average	17.00
5 wickets in innings	–
10 wickets in match	–
Best bowling	1/10
Catches/stumpings	9/–
- Source: ESPNcricinfo, 1 July 2020

Albert Champion (27 December 1851 – 30 June 1909) was an English first-class cricketer, who appeared for both Yorkshire and Lancashire over the course of fifteen years of sporadic appearances.

Born in Hollins End, Handsworth, Yorkshire, England, Champion played fourteen games for Yorkshire between 1876 and 1879, and reappeared for a single game for Lancashire against Nottinghamshire in 1886. He played three more first-class games for Liverpool and District in 1889 and 1890, two against his native county.

A left-handed batsman, he scored 218 runs at a lowly 8.07, with a best of 29 against Yorkshire. He took one wicket for Yorkshire, against Kent with his right arm medium pace, at a cost of 17 runs.

Champion died in Wortley, near Barnsley.
