= Caroline de Crespigny =

English poet and translator

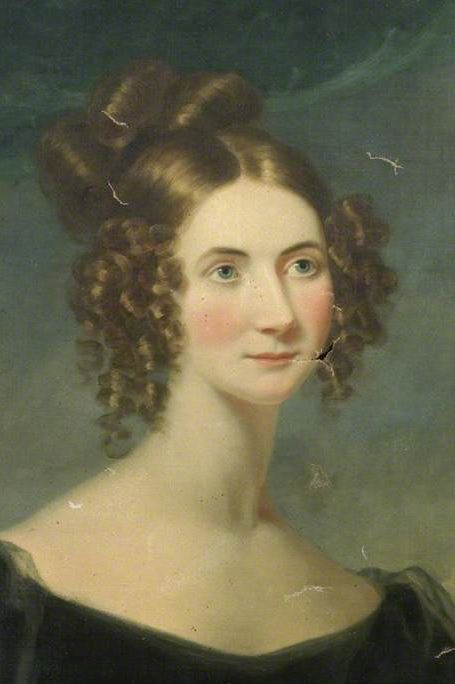
- de Crespigny 1826 by Philip August Gaugain
- Born: Caroline Bathurst; 14 September 1797; Durham, England
- Died: 26 December 1861 (aged 64); Heidelberg, Grand Duchy of Baden, Germany
- Occupations: Poet, translator
- Spouse: Rev Heaton Champion de Crespigny
- Partner: Thomas Medwin
- Children: Five
- Relatives: Henry Bathurst, Lord Bishop of Norwich, Allen Bathurst, 1st Earl Bathurst
- Writing career
- Genre: Poetry
- Notable works: My Souvenir (1844), Vision of Great Men (1848)
- Movement: Romanticism

Caroline Champion de Crespigny (née Bathurst; 14 September 1797 – 26 December 1861) was an English poet and translator. In the tradition of Romanticism, she published My Souvenir, or, Poems in 1844. Her translations, mainly from German into English, were often made in collaboration with Thomas Medwin, the cousin and biographer of Percy Bysshe Shelley.

== Early life ==
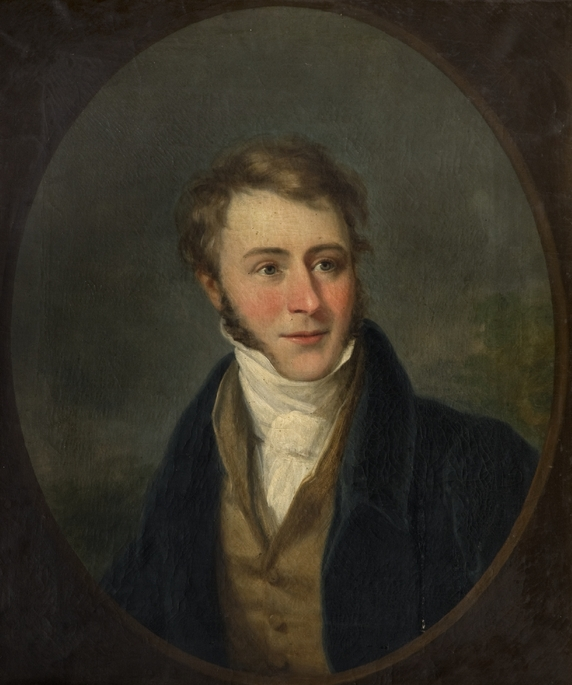
Portrait of her husband, the Rev. Heaton Champion de Crespigny, by Philip August Gaugain

Caroline Champion de Crespigny was born Caroline Bathurst at Durham in 1797 into a political and literary family. At the time of her birth, her father Rt Rev Dr Henry Bathurst (1744-1837) was prebendary canon at Durham Cathedral, later becoming Bishop of Norwich. His uncle, Allen Bathurst, 1st Earl Bathurst (1684-1775) was a Government minister and literary patron and friend of, amongst others, Laurence Sterne and William Congreve Her mother was Grace Coote, a sister of Sir Eyre Coote, a military governor of the Colony of Jamaica. One of her siblings Benjamin Bathurst gained notoriety during the Napoleonic Wars by his sudden, unexplained disappearance. In her early twenties she may have been a mistress of Lord Byron, as opined in letters by Julie Gmelin This is likely dubious speculation from Gmelin, who also records her as an accomplished harpist and harpsichord player. A number of watercolours also survive her.

In July 1820 Caroline Bathurst married Anglican clergyman Heaton Champion de Crespigny (son of William Champion de Crespigny, 2nd Baronet), later Vicar of Neatishead in Norfolk, settling in Vevey in Switzerland where their first child Eyre was born in May 1821. Her husband was profligate, and family letters written by Bishop Bathurst reveal that by 1828 Rev. Heaton de Crespigny was seriously in debt and unable to provide for his wife and children, who were living at Cheltenham. In 1833, Rev. Heaton was declared legally insolvent. The relationship between the spouses effectively ended in 1837, when Bishop Bathurst died and Caroline de Crespigny inherited enough of an income to live independently. They had five sons, the youngest remained with his father after the breakdown of their marriage.

== Heidelberg ==
A decision was made around 1840 to relocate the family to Heidelberg in Grand Duchy of Baden, Germany, where there was a small English literary community. It was in Heidelberg in 1841 that de Crespigny met the "friend", mentioned in the preface to her collection of poems, My Souvenir published in 1844. Thomas Medwin was the cousin and biographer of Percy Bysshe Shelley and Lord Byron. Their shared enthusiasm for Shelley may have been a catalyst for their lasting intimacy. In 1842 Medwin published a novel Lady Singleton where de Crespigny's verse appears at the head of some chapters and she is probably "the high-born and highly gifted lady" that Medwin thanks in his preface for the novel. Neither was financially secure enough to divorce their spouse, and the relationship was primarily intellectual. They spent the next twenty years until de Crespigny's death in 1861 participating in the literary life of this university city. Their mixed German and English friends included, amongst others, Fanny Brawne Lindon, the star-crossed fiancée and muse of poet John Keats, and Mary and William Howitt. When the 1848 Revolution swept through Germany and reached Heidelberg, de Crespigny and Medwin thought it more judicious to exit to more peaceable Weinsberg in the Kingdom of Württemberg, where they were hosted by poet, Justinus Kerner.

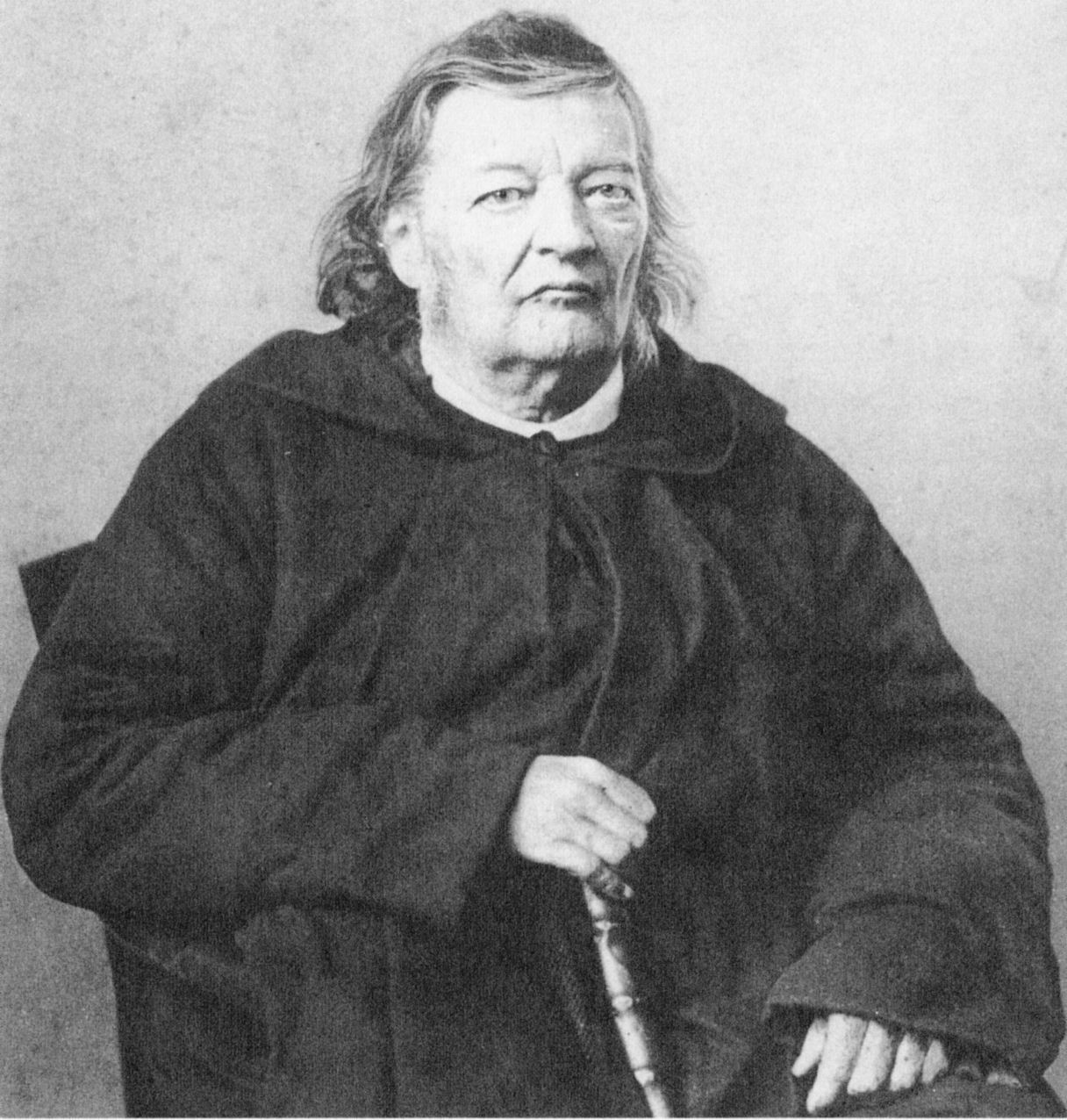
Justinus Kerner in old age

== My Souvenir, or, Poems (1844) ==
Her most significant publication, still in print, appeared in 1844. My Souvenir includes original poems, together with a number of translations, from Latin, Spanish, Portuguese, French and German poets. It is probable that Medwin, a skilled polyglot is responsible for some of these translations but he is not credited. Some of the original poems refer to subject matter related to her own family, such as Lines Written on Hearing of the Death of My Niece Rosa Bathurst, Drowned in The Tiber, Aged Seventeen or For My Mother's Tomb at Malvern. The style is late romantic.

An anonymous reviewer of My Souvenir referred to the original verses as distinguished by "elegance, sweetness, and tenderness rather than power or passion", adding that the translations "are selected with taste and feeling; and those from German are not the least attractive portion of the volume".

Two further volumes of translations and original poems appeared in quick succession: The Enchanted Rose: A Romant In Three Cantos, a translation from Ernst Schulze (Note: A Romant or Romaunt is a poetic term attributed to romantic verse often in epic form) and A Vision of Great Men, With Other Poems, and Translations From the Poetesses of Germany (1848) which concentrated on translating the poems of German women poets.

== Later years ==
Source material for de Crespigny's final years until her death in Heidelberg on 26 December 1861 is sparse, and knowledge is largely from the correspondence of her admirer Thomas Medwin. In 1858 he published, in The New Monthly Magazine, Renderings in Latin that contained the last contemporaneous translations of poems by Maciej Kazimierz Sarbiewski by Caroline de Crespigny.

Whilst De Crespigny's own work has remained hidden and largely ignored, her translations of poets such as Maciej Kazimierz Sarbiewski, Annette von Droste-Hülshoff and Justinus Kerner helped introduce these literary figures to the Anglosphere.

In 2016 The Bodleian Library, University of Oxford acquired an album of her verses and drawings providing scholars with access to her work.
