= Sir Claude Champion de Crespigny, 4th Baronet =

Claude Champion de Crespigny 4th Baronet
- Born: 20 April 1847; Chelsea, London, England
- Died: 26 June 1935 (aged 88); Maldon, Essex, England
- Occupations: Adventurer, sportsman, military officer and explorer

Wall monument - St Peter, Great Totham

Sir Claude Champion de Crespigny, 4th Baronet (20 April 1847 – 26 June 1935) was a British adventurer, sportsman, military officer and explorer.

== Biography ==
Champion de Crespigny was the son of Sir Claude William Champion de Crespigny, 3rd Baronet, and Mary de Crespigny. He was educated at Temple Grove in East Sheen until the age of thirteen, after which he joined the Royal Navy. He served as a midshipman aboard HMS Warrior in 1862. In 1866, he joined the army as an ensign in the King's Royal Rifle Corps (60th Regiment), serving in Ireland and India.

In the late 1860s, he explored northern Borneo and produced a report on the oil deposits of Sarawak.

After taking part in boxing matches and swimming through the Aswan rapids, in 1882 he took up hot air ballooning. The following year, he crossed the North Sea by balloon. He was awarded the Balloon Society's gold medal for the feat.

In 1883, the Sultan of Brunei, Sultan Abdul Momin, ceded the Baram region, including Miri, to Charles Brooke. The Fourth Division of Sarawak was immediately established, with Claude Champion de Crespigny appointed as its first resident.

He published his memoirs in 1896 and retired from steeplechasing, which he had taken up in 1867, in 1914.

He married Louisa Margaret McKerrall. They had nine children. His eldest child, Captain Claude Champion de Crespigny (1873–1910) died by suicide.

He was also a champion badminton player. He died at his home, Champion Lodge in Maldon, on 26 June 1935. He was succeeded in the baronetcy by his son Sir Claude Raul Champion de Crespigny, 5th Baronet (1878–1941).

== Bibliography ==
- He was featured on the cover of Tatler on 27 April 1927 (cover image).
- He provided an introduction to The Modern Fowler (Longmans, 1934), a sporting book by James Wentworth Day.
