= Sir Claude Champion de Crespigny, 3rd Baronet =

English cricketer and British Army officer

Personal information
- Full name: Sir Claude William Champion de Crespigny
- Born: 25 June 1818; Mayfair, London, England
- Died: 11 August 1868 (aged 50); Wivenhoe, Essex, England
- Batting: Unknown
- Relatives: Frederick Champion de Crespigny (brother)

Domestic team information
- Years: Team
- 1843: Marylebone Cricket Club

Career statistics
Competition	First-class
Matches	1
Runs scored	3
Batting average	1.50
100s/50s	–/–
Top score	3
Catches/stumpings	–/–
- Source: Cricinfo, 30 April 2021

Sir Claude William Champion de Crespigny, 3rd Baronet, DL (25 June 1818 – 11 August 1868) was an English first-class cricketer and British Army officer.

== Early life ==
The son of Augustus James Champion de Crespigny, he was born at Mayfair on 25 June 1818. His father died from yellow fever in 1825, with his grandfather Sir William Champion de Crespigny dying in 1829. Upon the death of his grandfather, he succeeded him as the 3rd Baronet of the Champion de Crespigny baronets. His younger brother was Frederick Champion de Crespigny.

He was educated at Winchester College, before going up to Trinity College, Cambridge. He later made a single appearance in first-class cricket for the Marylebone Cricket Club against Cambridge University at Cambridge in 1843. He made scores of 0 and 3 in the match, being dismissed by Richard Blaker and Thomas Fiott Hughes respectively; his brother, Frederick, was in the Cambridge side.

== Career ==
Champion de Crespigny was appointed a deputy lieutenant for Essex in August 1852. He was commissioned as a lieutenant the 1st Essex Volunteer Rifles in September 1859, formed in response to the French invasion scare in 1859. In January 1860, he was promoted to captain, before being made a lieutenant colonel in June of the same year.

== Personal life ==
In 1852 he married Mary Tyrell, daughter of Sir John Tyrell, 2nd Baronet.

Champion de Crespigny died at Wivenhoe Hall in Wivenhoe in August 1868. He was succeeded as the 4th Baronet by his son, Sir Claude Champion de Crespigny.

Peerage of the United Kingdom
Preceded by Sir William Champion de Crespigny	Champion de Crespigny baronets (of Champion Lodge); 1829–1868	Succeeded by Sir Claude Champion de Crespigny
