= Philip Champion de Crespigny (1704–1765) =

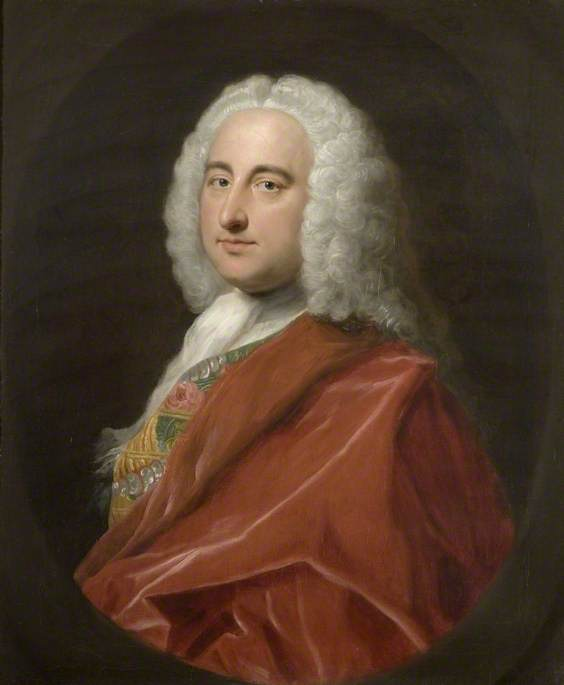
Portrait of Philip, by Jean-Baptiste van Loo

Philip Champion de Crespigny (1 April 1704 – 11 February 1765), was proctor of the Admiralty court.

== Early life ==
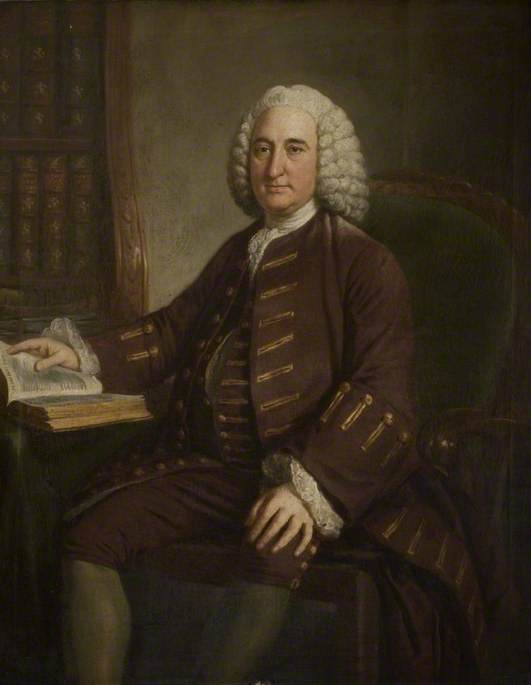
Portrait of Philip, by William Hoare, 1764

Champion de Crespigny was born in London on 1 April 1738. Of Huguenot descent, he was a son of Thomas Champion de Crespigny (1664–1712), an officer in the English Army, and Madeleine (née Granger) Champion de Crespigny. His younger brother, Claude Champion de Crespigny worked for the office of the South Sea Company and was a director of the French Hospital. His maternal grandparents were Israel Granger and Marie (née Billon) Granger. His paternal grandfather, Claude Champion de Crespigny, settled in England after the revocation of the Edict of Nantes. The Champion de Crespigny family originated in Normandy, France.

== Career ==
Champion de Crespigny served as proctor or legal practitioner of the Admiralty court.

== Personal life ==
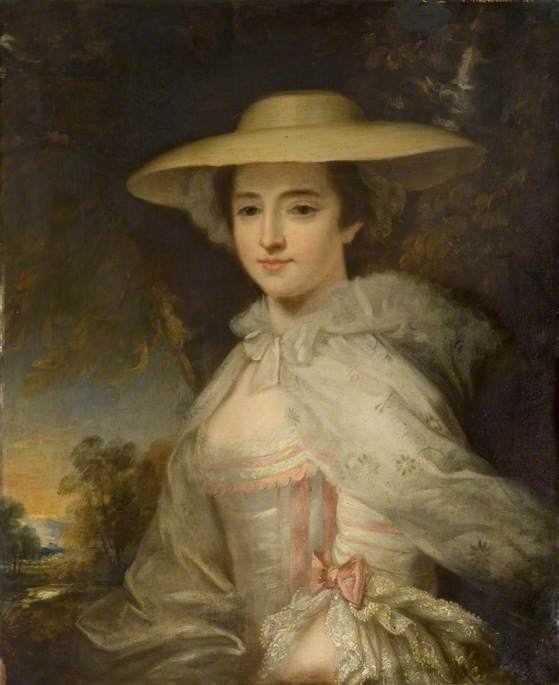
Portrait of his daughter, Susan, by George Romney (circle of)

On 5 February 1731 Champion de Crespigny was married to fellow Huguenot Anne Fonnereau in London. Anne was a daughter of Elizabeth (née Bureau) Fonnereau and Claude Fonnereau of Christchurch Mansion in Ipswich, Suffolk, a French Huguenot refugee who settled in England and became a prominent merchant. Together, they were the parents of:

- Sir Claude Champion de Crespigny, 1st Baronet (1734–1818), who married Mary Clarke, daughter of Joseph Clarke, in 1764.
- Susan Champion de Crespigny (1735–1766), who married Sir Richard Sutton, 1st Baronet, son of Sir Robert Sutton, the British Ambassador to France and Judith Tichborne (widow of Charles Spencer, 3rd Earl of Sunderland), in 1765. She died a year later.
- Philip Champion de Crespigny (1738–1803), who married four times. After his death, his widow married Sir John Keane, 1st Baronet in 1804.

Champion de Crespigny died in Camberwell, Surrey on 11 February 1765.

=== Descendants ===
Through his son Claude, he was a grandfather of Sir William Champion de Crespigny, 2nd Baronet, MP for Southampton who married Lady Sarah Windsor, a daughter of Other Windsor, 4th Earl of Plymouth.

Through his son Philip, he was a grandfather of Thomas Champion de Crespigny, MP for Sudbury who married Augusta Charlotte Thellusson, a daughter of merchant Peter Thellusson and granddaughter of Genevan banker and diplomat Isaac de Thellusson.
