= Baron Hampton =

Title in the Peerage of the United Kingdom

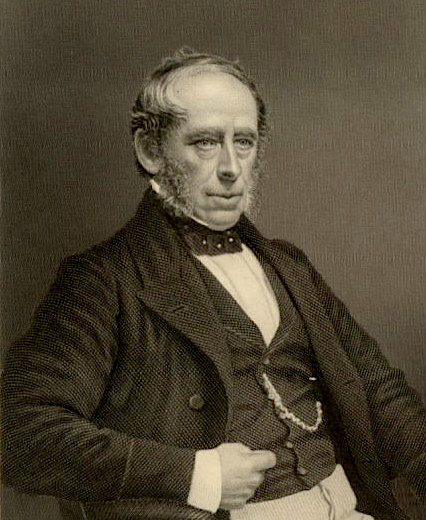
John Pakington, 1st Baron Hampton

Baron Hampton, of Hampton Lovett and of Westwood in the County of Worcester, is a title in the Peerage of the United Kingdom. It was created in 1874 for the Conservative politician Sir John Pakington, 1st Baronet.

== History ==
John Somerset Pakington (1799–1880) had previously represented Droitwich in the House of Commons, and had served as Secretary of State for War, and as First Lord of the Admiralty. He had been created a Baronet of Westwood Park in 1846. Born John Somerset Russell, he had assumed by royal licence the surname of Pakington in lieu in 1830, on inheriting the estates of his maternal uncle Sir John Pakington, 8th and last Baronet, of Ailesbury. He died aged 81.

The first Lord Hampton was succeeded in 1880 by his eldest son, John Slaney Pakington (1826–1893), the second Baron, then aged 53. Upon his death, aged 66 in 1893, the title passed to the second Baron's half-brother.

The third Baron was Herbert Perrott Murray Pakington (1848–1906), a half-brother to the second Baron, who succeeded to the title aged 45. Upon his death at 58 in 1906, the title passed to Herbert Stuart Pakington (1883–1962), the third Baron's second but eldest surviving son, then aged just 22. He served as Chief Commissioner of The Scout Association. Upon his death at 79, he was succeeded by 74-year-old Humphrey Arthur Pakington (1888–1974), the younger brother of the fourth Baron. Upon his death at 85, the title passed to 48-year-old Richard Humphrey Russell Pakington (1925–2003), the son of the fifth Baron. He sat as a Liberal member of the House of Lords, and was the party's Spokesman on Northern Ireland in the House of Lords from 1977 to 1987. On his death at 78 in 2003 his son succeeded him.

John Humphrey Arnott Pakington (b. 1964), son of the above, succeeded in 2003, aged 38.

As of December 2014, the current Lord Hampton had successfully proven his succession to the baronetcy and is therefore on the Official Roll of the Baronetage.

== Pakington baronets (1846) ==
- John Somerset Pakington, 1st Baronet (1799–1880) (created Baron Hampton in 1874)

=== Baron Hampton (1874) ===
Escutcheon of the Barons Hampton

- Sir John Somerset Pakington, 1st Baron Hampton (1799–1880)
- John Slaney Pakington, 2nd Baron Hampton (1826–1893)
- Herbert Perrott Murray Pakington, 3rd Baron Hampton (1848–1906)
- Herbert Stuart Pakington, 4th Baron Hampton (1883–1962)
- Humphrey Arthur Pakington, 5th Baron Hampton (1888–1974)
- Richard Humphrey Russell Pakington, 6th Baron Hampton (1925–2003)
- John Humphrey Arnott Pakington, 7th Baron Hampton (b. 1964)

The heir apparent is the present holder's son, the Hon. Charles Richard Caldato Pakington (b. 2005)

== Title succession chart ==
Title succession chart, Barons Hampton

John Pakington; 1st Baron Hampton; 1799–1880
John Pakington; 2nd Baron Hampton; 1826–1893	Herbert Pakington; 3rd Baron Hampton; 1848–1906
Hon. John Pakington; 1880–1897	Herbert Pakington; 4th Baron Hampton; 1883–1962	Hon. Hugh Pakington; 1887–1907	Humphrey Pakington; 5th Baron Hampton; 1888–1974
Richard Pakington; 6th Baron Hampton; 1925–2003
John Pakington; 7th Baron Hampton born 1964
Hon. Charles Pakington born 2005

== See also ==
- Pakington baronets of Ailesbury (*1620–1830, extinct)
