= Pakington =

Pakington is a surname, and may refer to:

- Dorothy Smith, Lady Pakington (died 1639)
- Dorothy, Lady Pakington (1623–1679), English writer of religious works
- Sir Herbert Pakington, 5th Baronet (c. 1701 – 1748), English politician
- Herbert Pakington, 4th Baron Hampton (1883–1962)
- John Pakington (MP and Sheriff) (c. 1477 – 1551)
- John Pakington (died 1625), English courtier
- Sir John Pakington, 1st Baronet (1600–1624), English politician
- Sir John Pakington, 2nd Baronet (1621–1680), English politician
- Sir John Pakington, 3rd Baronet (c. 1649 – 1688)
- Sir John Pakington, 4th Baronet (1671–1727), English politician
- John Pakington, 1st Baron Hampton (1799–1880)
- John Pakington, 7th Baron Hampton (born 1964)
- Robert Pakington (c. 1489 – 1536), London merchant and Member of Parliament.
- Thomas Pakington (c. 1530 – 1571), English knight

== See also ==
- Pakington family
- Pakington baronets
