= John Pakington =

John Pakington may refer to:

- Sir John Pakington (died 1551), Chirographer of the Court of Common Pleas
- Sir John Pakington (died 1625), English courtier
- Sir John Pakington, 1st Baronet (1600–1624), son of the above
- Sir John Pakington, 2nd Baronet (c. 1621 – 1680), English politician
- Sir John Pakington, 3rd Baronet (c. 1649 – 1688), English politician
- Sir John Pakington, 4th Baronet (1671–1727), English politician
- Sir John Pakington, 6th Baronet (c. 1722 – 1762) of the Pakington baronets
- Sir John Pakington, 8th Baronet (1760–1830) of the Pakington baronets
- John Pakington, 1st Baron Hampton (1799–1880), English politician

== See also ==
Pakington Baronets and Baron Hampton
