= Edmund Pytts =

Edmund Pytts may refer to:

- Edmund Pytts (died 1753), British politician, MP for Worcestershire
- Edmund Pytts (died 1781), British politician, MP for Worcestershire (son of the above)

== See also ==
- Edmund L. Pitts
