= All Saints' Church, Honington =

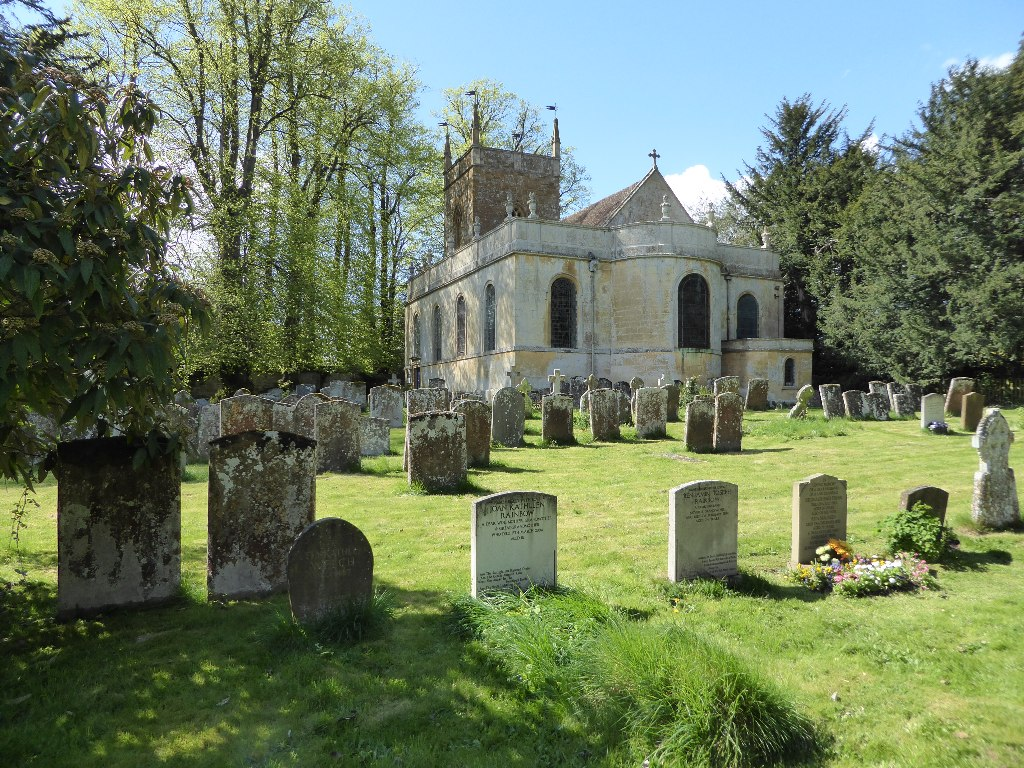
- All Saints' Church, Honington
- 52°04′54.48″N 1°37′12.11″W
- OS grid reference: SP 26135 42667
- Location: Honington, Warwickshire
- Country: England
- Denomination: Church of England

Administration
- Diocese: Diocese of Coventry

Listed Building – Grade I
- Official name: Church of All Saints
- Designated: 13 October 1966
- Reference no.: 1355483

All Saints' Church is an Anglican church in the village of Honington, in Warwickshire, England, and in the Diocese of Coventry. The building dates from the 1680s, and has a 13th-century tower. It is Grade I listed.

== Description ==
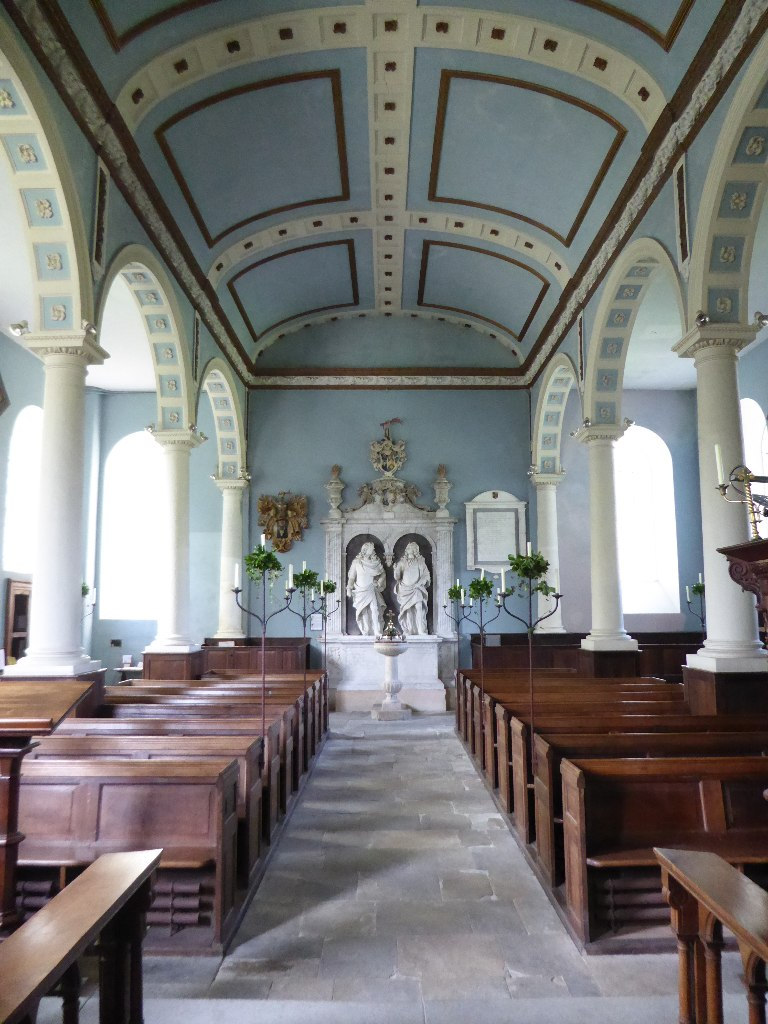
Interior, looking west: at the far end is the marble monument to Sir Henry Parker and his son Hugh

The west tower dates from the late 13th century; the rest of the church was rebuilt in the 1680s by Sir Henry Parker, who built Honington Hall, adjacent to the church, at the same time. The Victoria County History for the parish (1949) remarks that the building "is reminiscent of the plainer of the Wren churches in the City of London."

Externally, the walls of the church are of light yellow ashlar; there are four bays on the north and south sides, each with tall round-headed windows. There is a plain parapet, surmounted by carved urns between each bay. The tower has a parapet and corner pinnacles, probably of the late 17th century.

Inside, there is a nave with north and south aisles, and an apsidal chancel. The north and south arcades have four bays, corresponding to the exterior, with Tuscan columns, that have capitals with egg-and-dart ornaments, and the arches have panelled soffits. The nave has a coved ceiling that is plastered and divided into panels; the aisles have flat undecorated ceilings. The apse is semi-circular, with a diameter of about 12.5 feet (3.8 m), and has a single round-headed window.

=== Monuments ===
At the centre of the west end of the nave is a marble monument to Sir Henry Parker {died 1713) and his son Hugh (died 1712). It has pilasters on either side, and above are two carved urns flanking two shields of arms.

On the south wall is a marble monument to Joseph Townsend, who bought the Honington estate in 1737, and a wall tablet to his wife Judith. On the north wall there are monuments to 19th-century members of the Townsend family.

=== Bells ===
It is thought that there was originally a ring of five bells, by Matthew Bagley of Chacombe. There are now six bells, the five by Bagley, dated 1687 except one which was recast by Abraham Rudhall II of Gloucester and dated 1726; and one by John Rudhall of Gloucester, dated 1810.
