= Hugh Parker (politician) =

English Tory politician (1673–1713)

Member of Parliament for Evesham
- In office 1701–1708

Hugh Parker (baptized 16 December 1673 – 2 January 1713) was an English Tory politician who served as a Member of Parliament (MP) for Evesham from December 1701 until 1708.

He was the eldest son and heir of Sir Henry Parker, 2nd Baronet (1638–1713). He resided primarily at Honington Hall in Warwickshire, and also at Ormond Street, Holborn, London.

== Early life and education ==
Hugh Parker was born in 1673, the eldest son of Sir Henry Parker of Honington, Warwickshire. He was educated at Magdalen College, Oxford, matriculating on 10 January 1690 aged 16, and entered the Inner Temple later the same year. The Parker family seat was at Honington Hall, which had been rebuilt by his father in the later 17th century.

In adulthood Parker married Anne Smith, the eldest daughter of John Smith. Westminster Abbey's memorial inscription for Smith describes Anne as having married “Hugh Parker, Esquire, eldest son of Sir Henry Parker of Honnington in the county of Warwick, Baronet”.

== Parliamentary career ==
Parker was returned as a Tory MP for Evesham at the second general election of 1701, alongside Sir James Rushout. He was re-elected in 1702 and 1705, both times with John Rudge, and sat for the borough until 1708, when Sir Edward Goodere replaced him.
