= Hugh Parker =

Hugh Parker may refer to:

- Hugh Parker (footballer) (born 2006), Irish footballer
- Hugh Parker (politician) (1673–1713), British politician
