= William Caldwell (Royal Navy officer) =

Rear-Admiral William Caldwell
- Died: 1718
- Military career
- Branch: Royal Navy
- Service years: 1694 to 1718
- Rank: Rear-Admiral
- Commands: HMS Lizard; HMS Lyme; HMS Anglesea; HMS Crown; HMS Advice; HMS Swiftsure; HMS Torbay; Commander-in-Chief, The Thames
- Conflicts: War of the Spanish Succession

Rear-Admiral William Caldwell (died 1718) was a Royal Navy officer who briefly served as Commander-in-Chief, The Thames from 12 November 1717 to 1 December 1717.

== Naval career ==
Promoted to captain in January 1694, Caldwell commanded, successively, the sixth-rate HMS Lizard, the sixth-rate HMS Lyme, the fourth-rate HMS Anglesea, the fourth-rate HMS Crown, the fourth-rate HMS Advice, the third-rate HMS Swiftsure and the third-rate HMS Torbay. He saw action at the battle of Málaga in August 1704 and briefly served as Commander-in-Chief, The Thames from 12 November 1717 to 1 December 1717.

Caldwell married Catherine Nanfan, daughter of Bridges Nanfan of Birtsmorton Court in 1702. After his death in 1718, a memorial to Caldwell was erected in the church at Birtsmorton in Worcestershire.
