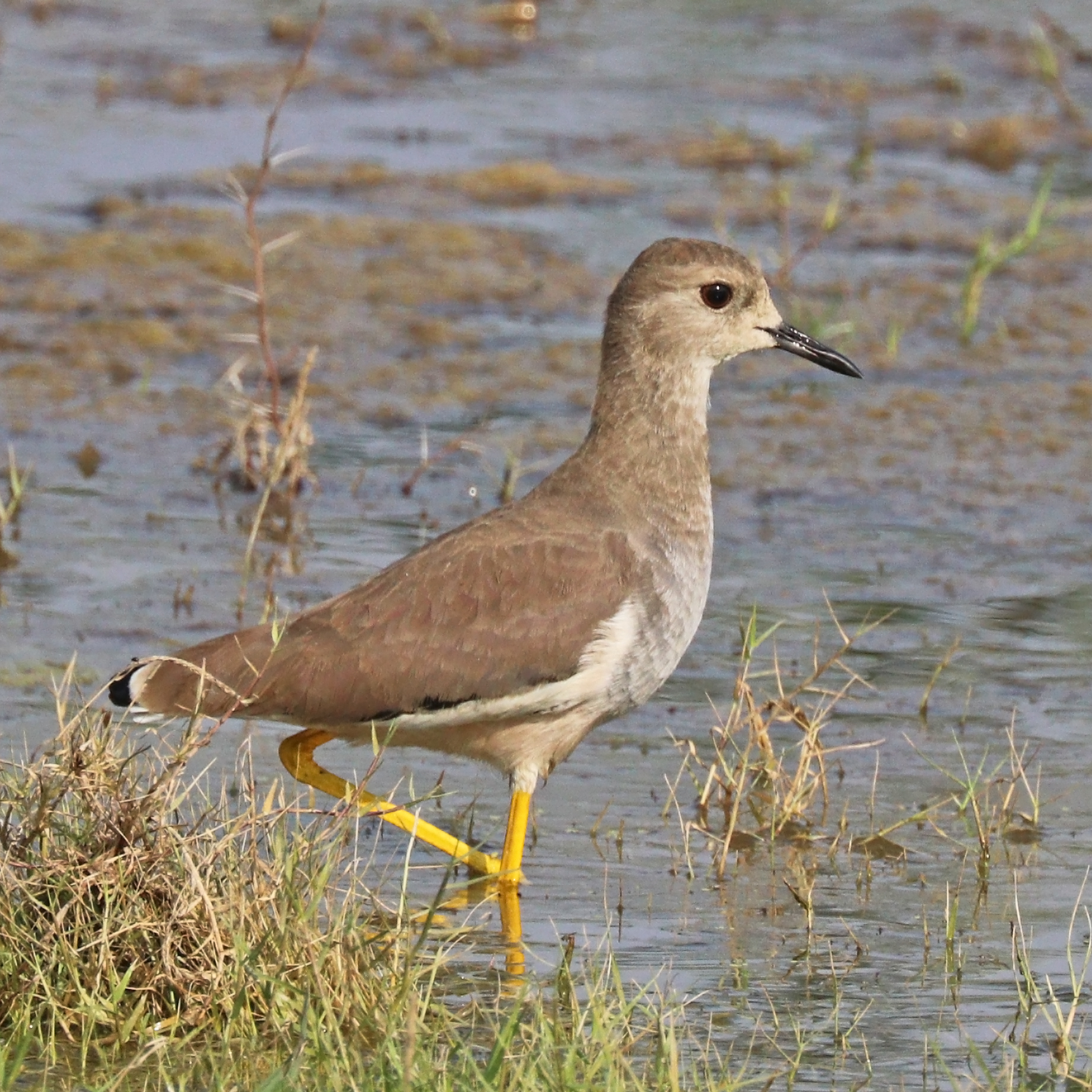
- Keoladeo National Park, Bharatpur, India

Conservation status
- Least Concern (IUCN 3.1)

Scientific classification
- Kingdom: Animalia
- Phylum: Chordata
- Class: Aves
- Order: Charadriiformes
- Family: Charadriidae
- Genus: Vanellus
- Species: V. leucurus

Binomial name
- Vanellus leucurus (Lichtenstein, MHC, 1823)

Synonyms
- Charadrius leucurus Lichtenstein, 1823; Chettusia leucura (Lichtenstein, 1823); Vanellochettusia leucura (Lichtenstein, 1823)

= White-tailed lapwing =

Species of bird

The white-tailed lapwing or white-tailed plover (Vanellus leucurus) is a wader in the lapwing genus. The genus name Vanellus is Medieval Latin for a lapwing and derives from vannus, which refers to a winnowing fan. The specific leucurus is from Ancient Greek leukouros, "white-tailed".

This medium-sized lapwing is long-legged and fairly long-billed. It is the only lapwing likely to be seen in other than very shallow water, where it picks insects and other small prey mainly from the surface.

Adults are slim erect birds with a brown back and foreneck, paler face and grey breast. Its long yellow legs, pure white tail and distinctive brown, white and black wings make this species unmistakable. Young birds have a scaly back, and may show some brown in the tail.

The breeding season call is a peewit, similar to northern lapwing.

It breeds semi-colonially on inland marshes in Iraq, Kuwait, Iran and southern Russia. Four eggs are laid in a ground nest. The Iraqi and Iranian breeders are mainly residents, but Russian birds migrate south in winter to the Indian subcontinent, the Middle East and north east Africa. It is a very rare vagrant in western Europe, the first example in Britain being found at Packington, Warwickshire on 12 July 1975.

In some parts of its distribution range the species faces threats related to habitat destruction and unintentional poaching.

The white-tailed lapwing is one of the species to which the Agreement on the Conservation of African-Eurasian Migratory Waterbirds (AEWA) applies.

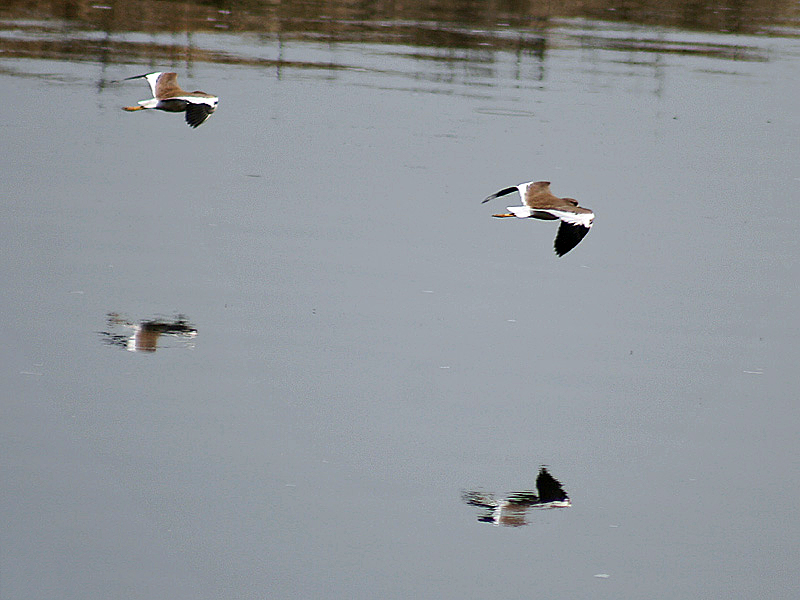
near Hodal in Faridabad District of Haryana, India
