= John Rudge (banker) =

English merchant, banker and politician

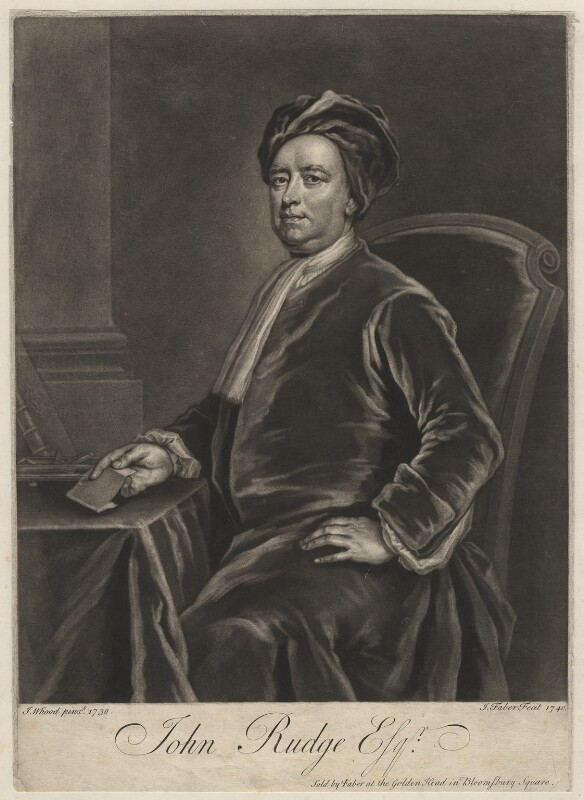
John Rudge

John Rudge (15 August 1669 – 22 March 1740), of Mark Lane, London and Evesham Abbey, Worcestershire, was a London merchant and financier, and Whig politician who sat in the House of Commons almost continuously between 1698 and 1734. He was a Governor of the Bank of England from 1713 to 1715.

== Early life and family ==
Rudge was the eldest surviving son of Edward Rudge, merchant of London, and his wife Susanna Dethick, daughter of Sir John Dethick of London. His father had purchased the manor of Evesham in 1664, and represented the borough in Parliament. Rudge was chosen Mayor of Evesham for 1691. On his father's death in 1696, he succeeded to the estate of Evesham Abbey. He married Susanna Letten, the daughter and heiress of John Letten of London on 10 January 1699.

== Business career ==
Rudge quickly took control of his father's trading interests after his father's death and became a leading figure in the City of London. He was active in the Mediterranean trade, and lent money to the consul at Alicante. In 1696 he was appointed an assistant in the Royal African Company (Slave Merchants) and to the committee of the East India Company.

In June 1698 he provided £2,000 towards the incorporation of the New East India Company. In 1700 he signed a petition of merchants trading to Portugal. He was a director of the Bank of England from 1699 to 1711. By 1702 he had sold his stock in the Old East India Company, preferring to invest in the New East India Company, of which he was a director from 1704 to 1708. He was elected Deputy Governor of the Bank of England for 1711 to 1713 and made Governor for 1713 to 1715. He subsequently resumed his directorship from 1715 to his death. He was also Deputy-Governor of the slaving South Sea Company from 1721 to 1730.

== Political career ==
Rudge was elected Member of Parliament for Evesham at a by-election 11 March 1698. He was returned again in a contest at the general election later in 1698. After being returned unopposed in January 1701 he was defeated in the ballot for commissioners of accounts, receiving only 20 votes. He lost his seat at the election of November 1701, when his interest was weakened by a money dispute with his relatives in the town, but he regained it at the 1702 English general election. He was not active on important committees, possibly because of his responsibility as a director of the Bank, and later the New East India Company. He voted on 13 February 1703 for agreeing the Lords’ amendments to the bill extending the time for taking the abjuration oath. On 23 February 1705 he acted as a teller for a clause to be added to the bill prohibiting all trade and commerce with France.

Rudge was returned again at Evesham at the 1705 English general election. He voted for the Court candidate for Speaker on 25 October 1705. He was not an active Member in this Parliament and his political stance remained in question. At the 1708 general election he was returned again for Evesham. He supported the naturalization of the Palatines in 1709, and voted for the impeachment of Dr Sacheverell in 1710. He was returned unopposed as a Whig at the 1710 British general election. By 1710 he was credited with £4,000 of stock in the Bank of England and his interest in its affairs led to his election as deputy-governor in May 1711 on the Whig ticket, which brought him into contact with the ministry of Robert Harley. In July 1712 he was representing the Bank at a meeting with the Treasury, and his brother Edward Rudge was appointed a lottery commissioner for 1712 to 1714. However, in the Commons he adopted a Whig stance. On 25 May 1711 he voted against an amendment on the South Sea bill and on 7 December he voted for the ‘No Peace Without Spain’ motion. On 9 June 1713 he acted as a teller on a bill relating to a historical omission on the proceedings of a treaty of commerce. On 18 June he voted against the French commerce bill. At the 1713 British general election, he was returned again. On 18 March, he voted against the expulsion of Richard Steele.

Rudge was returned as Whig MP for Evesham at the 1715 general election, but voted against the Administration in every recorded division during the reign of King George I. He was returned again at the 1722 British general election and at the 1727 British general election. In the reign of King George II his only recorded vote was against the repeal of the Septennial Act in 1734. He lost his seat at Evesham at the 1734 British general election.

== Death and legacy ==
Rudge died on 22 March 1740. He had a son Edward, and two daughters. He was buried in Wheatfield, Oxfordshire where his son was living. His tomb was sculpted by Peter Scheemakers.

== See also ==
- Chief Cashier of the Bank of England

Parliament of England
Preceded by Sir James Rushout, 1st Bt; Henry Parker	Member of Parliament for Evesham; 1698–1701; With: Henry Parker 1698-1701; Sir James Rushout, 2nd Bt 1701	Succeeded by Hugh Parker; Sir James Rushout, 2nd Bt
Preceded by Hugh Parker; Sir James Rushout, 2nd Bt	Member of Parliament for Evesham; 1702–1708; With: Hugh Parker	Succeeded by Parliament of Great Britain
Parliament of Great Britain
Preceded by Parliament of England	Member of Parliament for Evesham; 1708–1734; With: Sir Edward Goodere 1708-1715; John Deacle 1715-1722; Sir John Rushout, 4th Bt 1722-1734	Succeeded by Sir John Rushout, 4th Bt; William Taylor
Government offices
Preceded by Nathaniel Gould	Governor of the Bank of England; 1713 – 1715	Succeeded by Sir Peter Delmé
