= Honington =

Honington could refer to:

- Honington, Lincolnshire
- Honington, Suffolk
- Honington, Warwickshire
- RAF Honington in Suffolk
