= James Pytts =

English landowner and politician

James Pytts (c. 1627–1686) was an English landowner and politician who sat in the House of Commons at various times between 1660 and 1686.

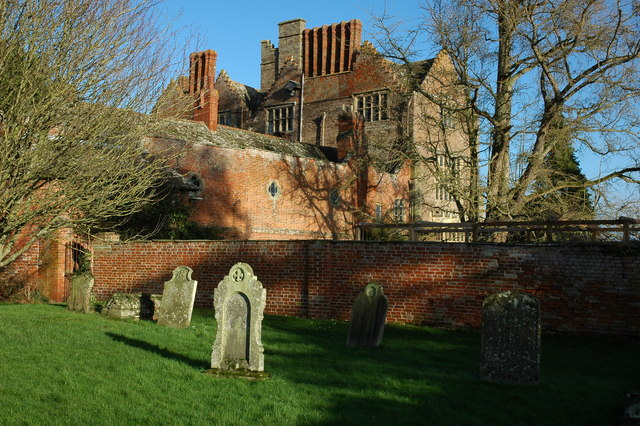
Kinnersley Castle, Herefordshire

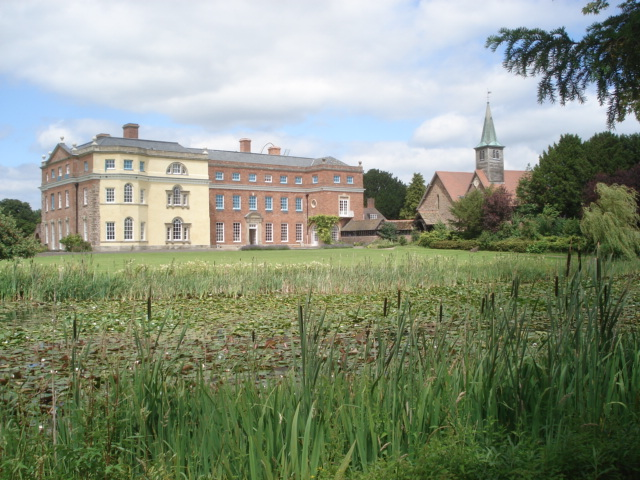
Kyre Park, Worcestershire

Pytts was the eldest son of Edward Pytts of Kyre Park, Worcestershire. He lived at Kinnersley Castle, five miles from Weobley, Herefordshire, which his first wife inherited during his father's lifetime. On his father's death in 1672 he inherited Kyre Park and in 1676 sold the Kinnersley estate.

He was a commissioner for assessment for Herefordshire in 1657 and from January 1660 to 1680. In April 1660, he was elected Member of Parliament for Weobley in the Convention Parliament but the election was declared void three months later. He was a J.P. for Herefordshire from July 1660 until his death. In 1673 became commissioner for assessment for Worcestershire until 1680 and J.P. for Worcestershire until his death. He was a commissioner for recusants for Worcestershire in 1675.

In March 1679 was elected MP for Leominster. He was Sheriff of Worcestershire from 1679 to 1680. He was commissioner for assessment for Leominster from 1679 to 1680. From 1685 he was Deputy Lieutenant and alderman of Bewdley. He was elected MP for Worcestershire in 1685.

Pytts died probably in 1686 at the age of about 58. He had married firstly Lucy Smallman, daughter and heiress of William Smallman of Kinnersley Castle. He married secondly Anne Fettiplace, daughter of Sir John Fettiplace, 1st Baronet, of Childrey, Berkshire. He had no children from either wife and was succeeded by his cousin Samuel Pytts, MP for Hereford and for Worcestershire, to whom Kyre Park passed.

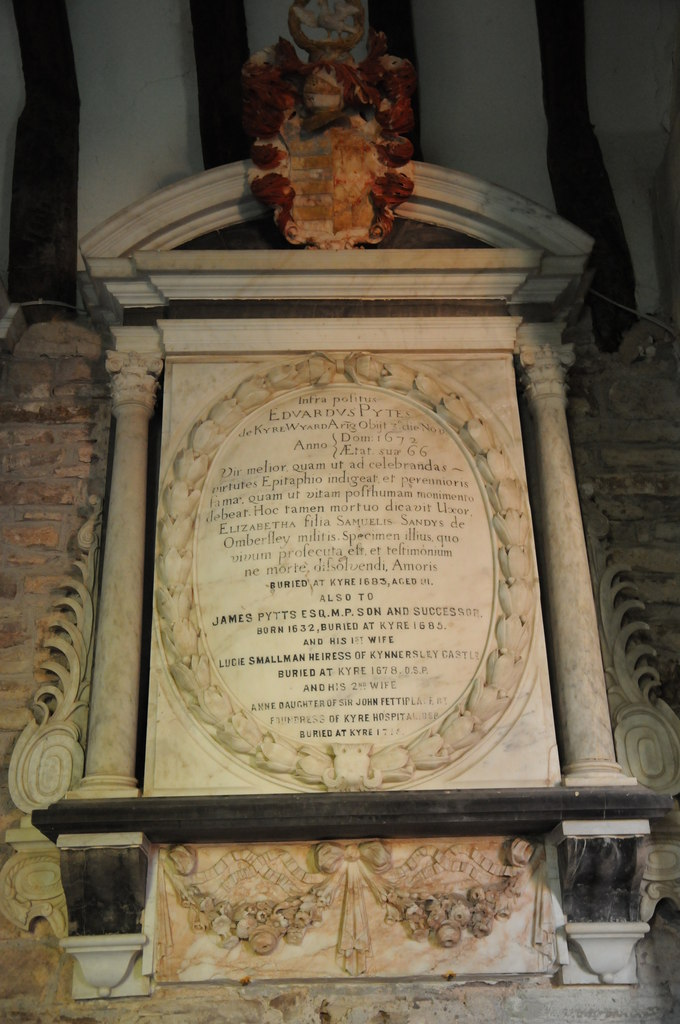
Pytts memorial in Kyre church naming James and both his wives

Parliament of England
Preceded by Herbert Perrott; Robert Andrews	Member of Parliament for Weobley; 1660; With: Richard Weston	Succeeded by Thomas Tomkyns; Herbert Perrott
Preceded by Ranald Grahme; Humphrey Cornewall	Member of Parliament for Leominster; 1679; With: John Dutton Colt	Succeeded by Thomas Coningsby; John Dutton Colt
Preceded by Thomas Foley; Bridges Nanfan	Member of Parliament for Worcestershire; 1685–1686; With: Sir John Pakington, Bt.	Succeeded by Sir James Rushout, Bt. Thomas Foley
