= Westwood, Worcestershire =

Civil parish in Worcestershire, England

Coordinates: 52.273°N 2.183°W

Westwood
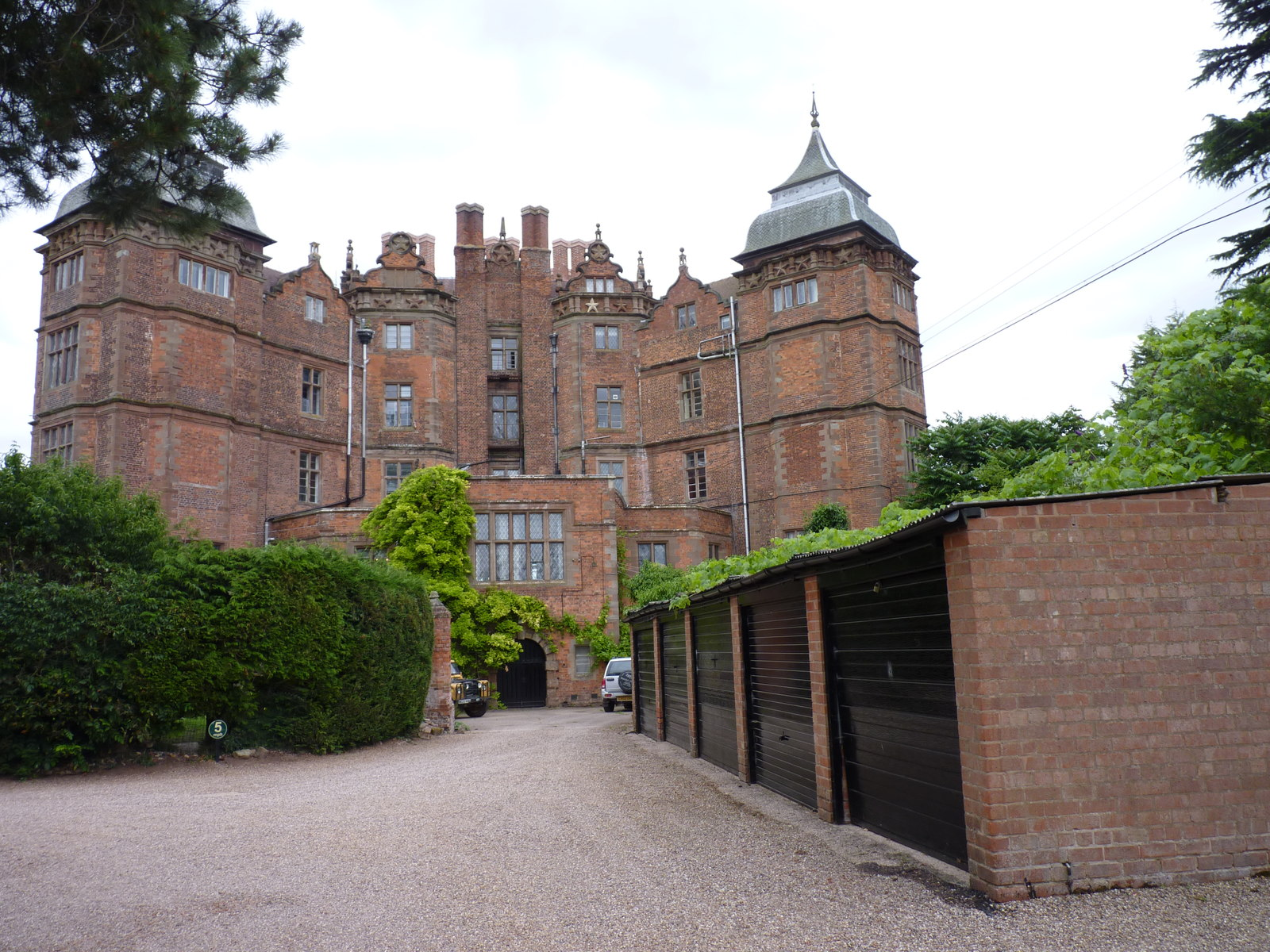
- Westwood House from the rear in 2015

- Location within Worcestershire
- Population: 78 (2021 census)
- OS grid reference: SO875640
- Civil parish: Westwood
- District: Wychavon
- Shire county: Worcestershire
- Region: West Midlands
- Country: England
- Sovereign state: United Kingdom
- Post town: DROITWICH
- Postcode district: WR9
- Police: West Mercia
- Fire: Hereford and Worcester
- Ambulance: West Midlands
- UK Parliament: Droitwich and Evesham

Westwood is a civil parish in Wychavon district, Worcestershire, England. The parish consists of Westwood Park, the grounds of Westwood House, near Droitwich Spa. In 2021 the parish had a population of 78. It shares a grouped parish council with the neighbouring village of Hampton Lovett.

== History ==
The parish contains the Grade I listed Westwood House and its former estate, the Grade II listed Westwood Park. Originally a nunnery, the house was granted to Sir John Pakington by Henry VIII during the dissolution of the monasteries and has undergone many expansions throughout its existence. The house was ultimately converted into twelve separate residencies has been sold to private owners.

In John Marius Wilson's Imperial Gazetteer of England and Wales of 1870–72, Westwood had a population of 22.

== Geography ==
The parish covers an area of around 1.16 square miles (3 square kilometres). It includes a large lake which holds Site of Special Scientific Interest classification. The adjacent villages include Hampton Lovett, Hadley and Doverdale. Westwood sits immediately west of the nearest town, Droitwich, and about 3.5 miles north of Worcester. The area is mostly rural and contains extensive farmland and wooded areas.

== Politics ==
The parish is part of the non-metropolitan district of Wychavon and the non-metropolitan and ceremonial county of Worcestershire, governed by Worcestershire County Council. Westwood falls under the Droitwich and Evesham parliament constituency, currently represented by the Conservative Party MP Nigel Huddleston in the House of Commons. Local events and meetings are held in the village hall in Hampton Lovett, adjacent to the Church of St Mary's and All Saints.
