= Birtsmorton Court =

Fortified manor house in Worcestershire, England

Coordinates: 52.0171°N 2.292°W

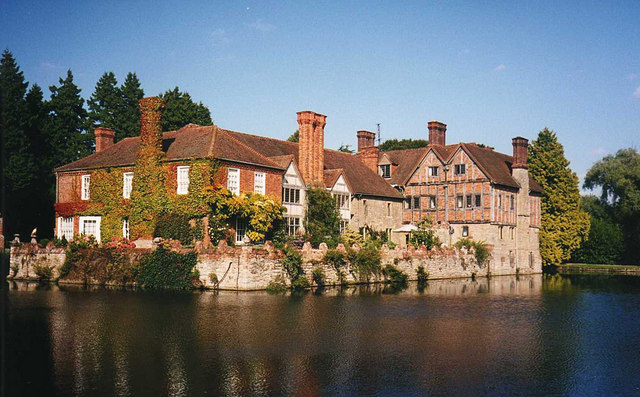
Birtsmorton Court.

Birtsmorton Court is a Grade I listed fortified medieval moated manor house near Malvern in Worcestershire, in the former woodlands of Malvern Chase.

It is located in Birtsmorton, a small agricultural parish 7 miles south-east of Malvern Wells, Worcestershire and 8 miles west of Tewkesbury, Gloucestershire.

== Etymology ==
The English place name element birt-, which often signifies the birches such as grow in this low-lying site, in this particular case may be a transformation of de Brute, holding the manor under Edward I.

== History ==
The manor is mentioned in the Domesday Book; the present house, partly half-timbered built on a courtyard plan, is in part of the 13th century. In 1424–25 Birtsmorton became the seat of John Nanfan, who had most of the earlier structure demolished before his death in about 1447. Cardinal Wolsey is an important historical figure, who is also reported to have frequently stayed at the court during his earlier days. The house was remodelled for Giles Nanfan in about 1572, as heraldry in the Great Hall suggests.

The Nanfan family retained the Manor until 1771. The last male heir, Bridges Nanfan, left the estate to his daughter Catherine in 1704. She married four times, including to Lord Coote, the Governor of New York, in 1680 and to Admiral William Caldwell in 1702. On the death of Catherine's granddaughter Judith in 1771, the manor passed to the Coote family who sold it in 1779.

The present aspect of the house is in part due to antiquarian restoration and emendation by Frederick S. Waller, 1871–72. The east range was destroyed by fire in the 18th century and rebuilt in 1929–30 by A. Hill Parker and Son, in what Brooks and Pevsner called a "successful pastiche".

William Huskisson was born at Birtsmorton Court on 11 March 1770 and spent his childhood here until he was 13. The house was a setting for William Samuel Symonds' historical novel Malvern Chase.

The house is now privately owned and available for special events.

== Owners ==
- Nigel and Rosalie Dawes (current owners for over 40 years)
- Francis Bradley Bradley-Birt (b. 1874), the husband (m. 1920) of Lady Norah Beatrice Henriette Spencer-Churchill (1875–1946)

== Sources ==
- Willis-Bund, J.W.; Page, W.H., eds. (1924). A History of the County of Worcester: Volume 4. Victoria County History. pp. 29–33.
