= Sir Herbert Pakington, 5th Baronet =

- Westwood House, Droitwich - seat of the Pakington family
- Born: Herbert Perrott Pakington c. 1701
- Died: 1748
- Spouse: Elizabeth Conyers
- Parent(s): Sir John Packington; Hester Perrott

Sir Herbert Perrott Pakington, 5th Baronet (c. 1701 – 24 September 1748), of Westwood, near Droitwich, Worcestershire, was an English Tory politician who sat in the House of Commons from 1727 to 1741.

== Early life ==
Pakington was the only surviving son of Sir John Packington and his second wife, Hester Perrott. He married Elizabeth Conyers, daughter of John Conyers, K.C., of Walthamstow, Essex on. 22 June 1721. On the death of his father in 1727, he succeeded to the baronetcy and Westwood House.

== Career ==
Pakington was returned as Tory Member of Parliament for Worcestershire at the 1727 British general election in succession to his father. He was returned unopposed at the 1734 British general election. He voted against the Administration in all known divisions except on the motion to remove Walpole in February 1741. He did not stand in 1741.

Pakington was one of the lovers of the courtesan Teresia Constantia Phillips. Packington was so obsessed with her that he twice attempted suicide to keep her attention.

== Death and legacy ==
Pakington died on 24 September 1748. He had two sons, John and Herbert Perrott, who became the sixth and seventh Pakington baronets, respectively.

Parliament of Great Britain
Preceded by Sir John Pakington, Bt; Sir Thomas Lyttelton, Bt	Member of Parliament for Worcestershire; 1727 – 1741; With: Sir Thomas Lyttelton, Bt 1727–34; Edmund Lechmere 1734–41	Succeeded by Edmund Pytts I Edmund Lechmere
Baronetage of England
Preceded by John Pakington	Baronet (of Ailesbury); 1725 – 1748	Succeeded by John Pakington
