= Bridges Nanfan =

English politician

Bridges Nanfan (baptised 25 March 1623 – 4 June 1704) was an English politician, MP for Worcester and Worcestershire.

== Biography ==
Nanfan was the son of John Nanfan MP of Birtsmorton, Worcestershire and his wife Mary, daughter of Edward Fleet alias Waldegrave of Worcester.

Bridges matriculated at Balliol College, Oxford in 1640, and became a student of the Inner Temple in 1648.

He served as a Commissioner for Assessment in Worcestershire 1664–80 and 1689, and a JP from 1678.

Bridges and Thomas Foley were elected unopposed for Worcestershire in 1681.

With court support, Bridges was elected MP for Worcester in 1685. The electoral agents of King James II recommended him for re-election, as a court candidate of "good character and interest". When Bridges' son-in-law Lord Coote joined the Prince of Orange in the Glorious Revolution, Nanfan disclaimed responsibility, claiming that his daughter's marriage had been made without his consent.

He died on 4 June 1704, and was buried at Birtsmorton.

== Family ==
On 15 November 1660, Nanfan married Catherine Hastings, daughter of Sir George Hastings MP. They had one daughter:

- Catherine Nanfan (1665–1738), married (1) Richard Coote, 1st Earl of Bellomont, (2) Admiral William Caldwell, (3) Samuel Pytts MP, (4) William Bridgen

Parliament of England
Preceded by Thomas Foley; Samuel Sandys	Member of Parliament for Worcestershire; 1681; With: Thomas Foley	Succeeded by Sir John Pakington, Bt; James Pytts
Preceded by Henry Herbert; Sir Francis Winnington	Member of Parliament for Worcester; 1685–1687; With: William Bromley	Succeeded by William Bromley; Sir John Somers
