= Thomas Foley (died 1701) =

English politician and industrialist

Thomas Foley Jr. (c. 1641 – 1 February 1701) was an English politician and industrialist involved in the iron industry.

== Early life ==
Foley was the eldest son of the ironmaster Thomas Foley. He succeeded his father to the Great Witley estate, including Witley Court, in 1677.

He was educated at Pembroke College, Cambridge, being admitted in 1657 aged 16, graduating B.A. 1660, and was admitted to the Inner Temple in 1657.

== Career ==
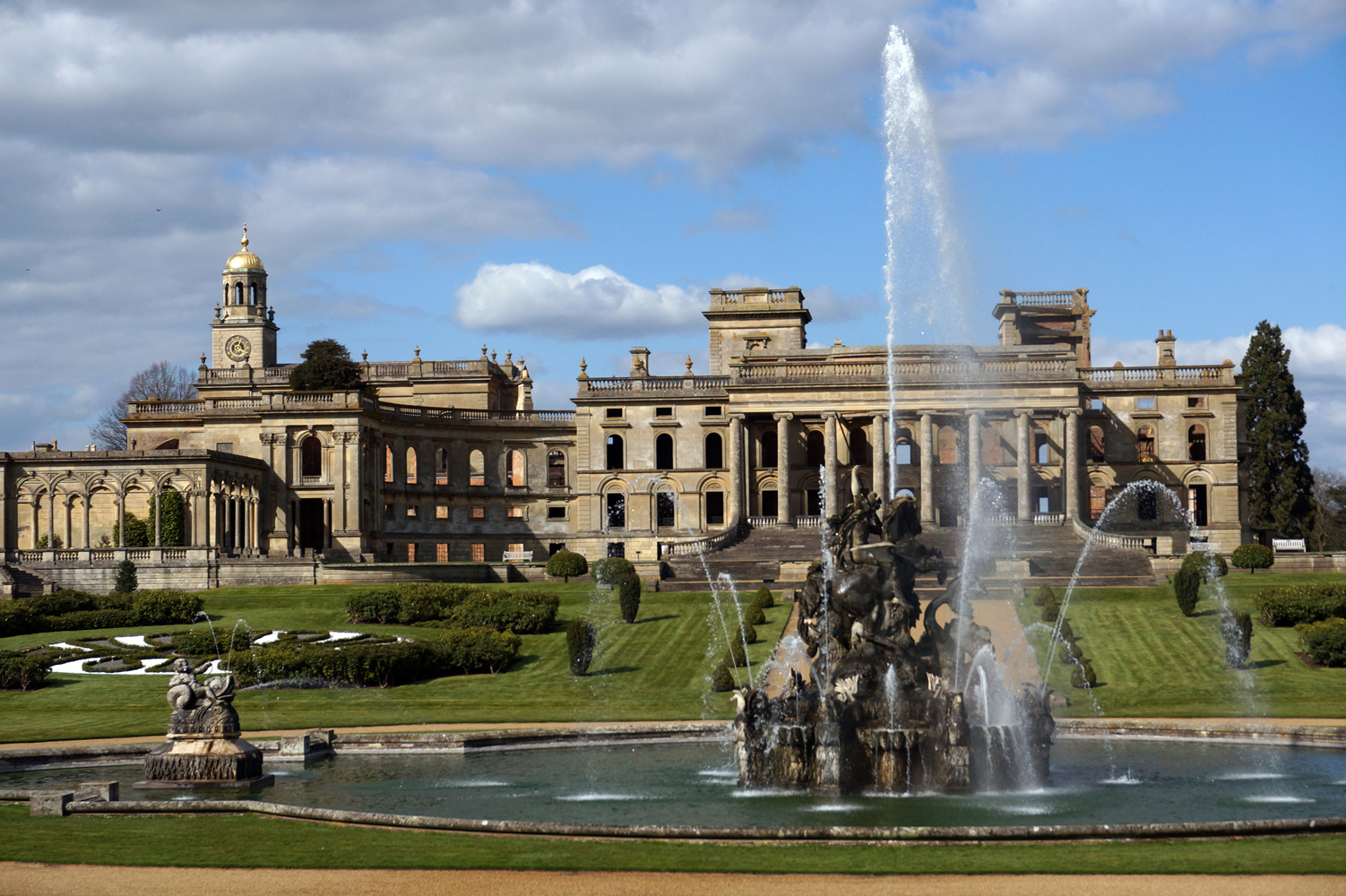
Witley Court

He was appointed High Sheriff of Worcestershire for 1673–74. He served as a Member of Parliament for Worcestershire from 1679 to 1685; again from 1689 to 1698 and then in 1699 and 1701 for Droitwich. He was an active member.

Like several members of his family, he was concerned in the iron industry, but only at Tintern.

== Personal life ==
He married Elizabeth Ashe, daughter of Edward Ashe of Heytesbury, Wiltshire; they had four sons and four daughters:

- Thomas Foley (1673–1733), who was created Baron Foley of Kidderminster in 1712.
- Edward Foley (1676–1747), twice MP for Droitwich
- Richard Foley (1681–1732), MP for Droitwich in 1711–1732
- John Foley (d. 1710), who drowned in 1710.
- Elizabeth Foley, sixth great-grandmother to Queen Elizabeth II, who married Robert Harley, later Lord Treasurer and Earl of Oxford
- Anne Foley who married Salwey Winnington
- Sarah Foley who married Robert Harley's brother, Edward Harley MP.
- Mary Foley who married Sir Blundel Charlton

Parliament of England
Preceded by Sir John Pakington, 2nd Bt; Samuel Sandys	Member of Parliament for Worcestershire; 1679–1685; With: Samuel Sandys 1679–1681; Bridges Nanfan 1681–1685	Succeeded by Sir John Pakington, 3rd Bt; James Pytts
Preceded by Sir John Pakington, 3rd Bt; James Pytts	Member of Parliament for Worcestershire; 1689–1698; With: Sir James Rushout, Bt 1689–1690; Sir John Pakington, 4th Bt 1690–1695; Edwin Sandys 1695–1698	Succeeded by Sir John Pakington, 4th Bt; William Walsh
Preceded by Charles Cocks; Thomas Foley	Member of Parliament for Droitwich; 1699–1701; With: Charles Cocks 1689–1690	Succeeded by Charles Cocks; Philip Foley
