= Teresia Constantia Phillips =

British courtesan and bigamist

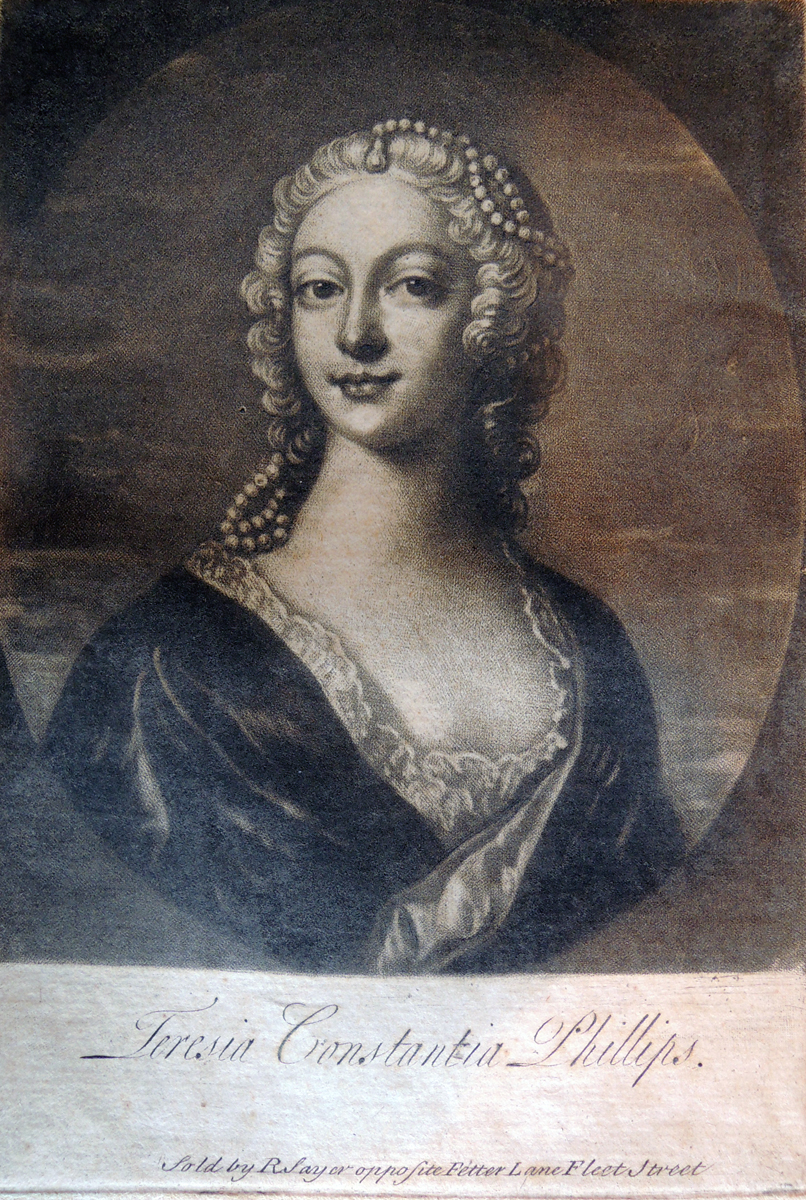
- Born: 1700/1703; Kensington, England
- Died: 2 February 1765; Kingston, Jamaica
- Other name: Con Phillips

Teresia Constantia Phillips or Con Phillips (1700/1703 – 2 February 1765) was a British courtesan and bigamist who married at least five times and published a scandalous autobiography. The case is described in Lawrence Stone's Uncertain Unions: Marriage in England 1660–1753 (1992).

== Life ==
Phillips was born in Kensington in 1700 or 1703. Her early life is not reliably known as the major source is her autobiography. Her mother died when she was two years old. Her education was said to have been paid for by her godmother, Catherine Powlett, the Duchess of Bolton. She attended Mrs Filler's boarding-school in Westminster until her father remarried to a servant. It has been suggested that the choice of step-mother may have led to her godmother removing the source of funding. She was raped at an early age by a character known as "Thomas Grimes". This was thought to be the assumed name of Philip Stanhope, 4th Earl of Chesterfield, but more recent research identifies her attacker as Thomas Lumley-Saunderson, 3rd Earl of Scarbrough. Phillips herself never realised who her attacker was and intriguingly her autobiography was dedicated to the man who attacked her, the 3rd Earl of Scarborough.

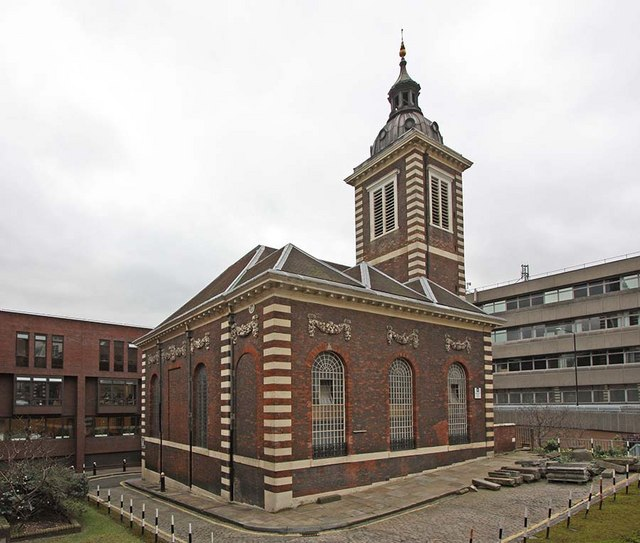
Phillips' first two marriages took place at St Benet's, Paul's Wharf in 1722 and 1724.

=== Courtesan ===
On 11 November 1722 she married Francis Devall, a bigamist at the Anglican church of St Benet's, Paul's Wharf. This man assumed responsibility for her debts. On 9 February 1724 she married at the same church a rich merchant/banker Henry Muilman (Amsterdam, 27 August 1698 – Marylebone, 4 May 1772) and an uncle of Trench Chiswell. The marriage did not last long; within a year she lived in Paris with Mr. B. Henceforth. On 6 November 1724 Henry Muilman began a lawsuit for nullity of marriage on grounds of a prior marriage. Muilman refused to pay her the money that had been agreed as part of the separation and a dispute began. During the long court case she was said to have had seven other affairs. The men involved included her surgeon and the Tory M.P. Sir Herbert Pakington, 5th Baronet. In 1727 she began a relationship with the gardener Philip Southcote.

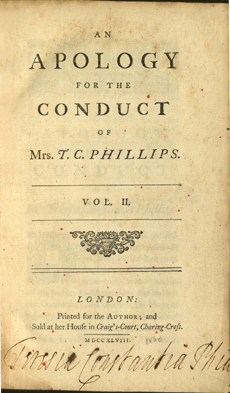
Published from 1748

For two years she traveled around with a child, who died at the age of eleven (1735). Phillips went abroad to France a number of times to avoid her creditors, but this was not always successful and she served time in the debtors' prison from 1742 to 1744. The long-running court case between her and Muilman was settled in 1748.

=== Memoirs ===
Phillips wrote scandalous memoirs which had thinly hidden descriptions of her liaisons. Her main work was An Apology which was published in eighteen parts making up three volumes from 1748 through to 1749. Michael Mascuch notes that the tone changes from a self-effacing apology to a proud justification for her victory over adversity and ill treatment. These potentially libellous works led to Henry Fielding casting "Mrs Fllps" as a whore in a puppet play he wrote and he later urged the full force of the law of libel to be used against people like her and Paul Whitehead. Whitehead was presumed to be her accomplice in her publications.

Phillips' descriptions were not always complimentary as she made out Philip Southcote to be self-obsessed and effeminate. The books themselves were so scandalous that the academic, Elizabeth Carter's, reading was described as so charitable that it would allow "her to read sympathetically even the scandalous memoirs of Teresia Constantia Phillips". It has been speculated that the books may have been published in serial form to encourage blackmail of her previous lovers. The book described her five marriages and affairs with seven well-known men and the double standards that applied to her own life and bigamy.

=== Jamaica ===
In 1751, Teresia Constantia Phillips settled in Jamaica with her lover, the wealthy Clarendon planter Henry Needham. Upon the instigation of Needham's friend, governor Henry Moore, she became singular as the only woman to be given an official government post when she was appointed by the governor with the office Mistress of the Revels, an office with the task to supervise and organize the official celebrations and entertainments in the colony, a task she performed and for which she was given a salary from the government.

Phillips died in Kingston in Jamaica. She was said to have made three additional marriages in Jamaica and she was said to have died without mourners.
