= John Bulkeley Coventry =

British politician

The Hon. John Bulkeley Coventry (21 March 1724 – 16 March 1801), called The Hon. John Bulkeley Coventry-Bulkeley after 1764, was a British politician, MP for Worcestershire 1751–1761.

Coventry was the third son of William Coventry, 5th Earl of Coventry.

Coventry was educated as a gentleman commoner at Winchester College from 1731, and matriculated at University College, Oxford in 1740, aged 16.

Coventry's oldest brother Thomas Henry predeceased their father, the 5th Earl. When the 5th Earl died in 1751, the second brother George therefore succeeded him as 6th Earl, vacating his seat as MP for Worcestershire. John was elected unopposed to succeed him in a by-election.

On succeeding to the estates of his cousin James Coventry Bulkeley, he adopted the additional name Bulkeley in 1764.

He died on 16 March 1801. His will was probated on 27 March 1801.

Parliament of Great Britain
Preceded by Edmund Pytts (I); Viscount Deerhurst	Member of Parliament for Worcestershire; 1751–1761; With: Edmund Pytts (I); Edmund Pytts (II)	Succeeded by John Ward; William Dowdeswell
