= Edmund Lechmere (Worcestershire MP) =

British politician

Edmund Lechmere (4 April 1710 – 29 March 1805) was a British politician, MP for Worcestershire 1734–1747.

Lechmere was the son of Anthony Lechmere MP (1710–1805), and the nephew of Nicholas Lechmere, 1st Baron Lechmere, Attorney General.

He was educated by Mr. Vaslett at Fulham, and matriculated at Trinity College, Cambridge in 1728.

He served as High Sheriff of Worcestershire in 1732–33.

Horace Walpole described Lechmere as "a great grazier and a mere country squire". Unlike his father and his uncle, he was a Tory, who consistently voted against the Whig government.

Lechmere and Sir Herbert Pakington, Bt were elected unopposed for Worcestershire in 1734; Lechmere and fellow Tory Edmund Pytts defeated two Whigs in 1741. Lechmere did not stand in 1747.

He died on 29 March 1805, a few days short of his 95th birthday, and was buried at Hanley on 5 April 1805.

== Family ==
Lechmere married firstly, on 12 October 1732, Elizabeth daughter of Sir Blunden Charlton, 3rd Bt. They had two sons:

- Nicholas Lechmere MP (1733–1807), adopted the additional surname Charlton in 1784
- Edmund Lechmere MP (1747–1798)

He married secondly, on 4 June 1765, Elizabeth daughter of Rev. John Whitmore. They had one son:

- Sir Anthony Lechmere, 1st Bt. (1766–1849), created a baronet in 1818

Parliament of Great Britain
Preceded by Sir Herbert Pakington, Bt; Sir Thomas Lyttelton, Bt	Member of Parliament for Worcestershire; 1734–1747; With: Sir Herbert Pakington, Bt; Edmund Pytts	Succeeded by Edmund Pytts; Viscount Deerhurst
