= HMS Lizard (1694) =

History

England
- Name: HMS Lizard
- Ordered: 21 July 1693
- Builder: Royal Dockyard, Chatham
- Launched: 19 March 1694
- Commissioned: 22 January 1694
- Fate: Lost with all hands 31 May 1696

General characteristics
- Type: 20-gun Sixth Rate
- Tons burthen: 250 36/94 bm
- Length: 94 ft 3 in (28.7 m) gundeck; 79 ft 6 in (24.2 m) keel for tonnage
- Beam: 24 ft 4 in (7.4 m) for tonnage
- Depth of hold: 10 ft 8 in (3.3 m)
- Armament: initially as ordered; 20 × sakers on wooden trucks (UD); 4 × 3-pdr on wooden trucks (QD); 1703 Establishment; 20 × 6-pdrs on wooden trucks (UD); 4 × 4-pdr on wooden trucks (QD)

HMS Lizard was a member of the standardized 20-gun sixth rates built at the end of the 17th century. She was commissioned for service in the Bristol Channel, followed by the Irish Sea. She went missinging in the Mediterranean when she was lost with all hands in May 1696.

Lizard was the fourth ship to bear this name since it was used for a 120 builder's measure ship listed from 1512 to 1522.

== Construction ==
She was ordered in the First Batch of four ships from Chatham Dockyard to be built under the guidance of their Master Shipwright, Robert Lee. She was launched on 19 March 1694.

== Commissioned service ==
She was commissioned on 22 January 1694 under the command of Captain William Caldwell, RN for service in the Bristol Channel. Just over a year later, Captain Joseph Welby, RN assumed command on 26 February 1695. She maintained her service in the Briston Channel before moving into the Irish Sea. In 1696 she was assigned to the Mediterranean. Shortly after arriving in the Mediterranean she went missing.

== Loss ==
HMS Lizard was lost with all hands off Toulon on 31 May 1696.
