= Packington (disambiguation) =

Packington is a village and civil parish in Leicestershire, England.

Packington may also refer to:

- Packington, Quebec
- HMS Packington (M1214)

== See also ==
- Pakington, a famous English Worcestershire family
- Little Packington, a hamlet in North Warwickshire
- Great Packington, a hamlet near Meriden, Warwickshire
- Packington Old Hall, 17th-century manor house situated at Great Packington
- Packington Hall, a 17th-century mansion situated at Great Packington
- Packington Hall, Staffordshire, a country mansion designed by James Wyatt in the 18th century
