= Edmund Pytts (died 1781) =

British Tory politician

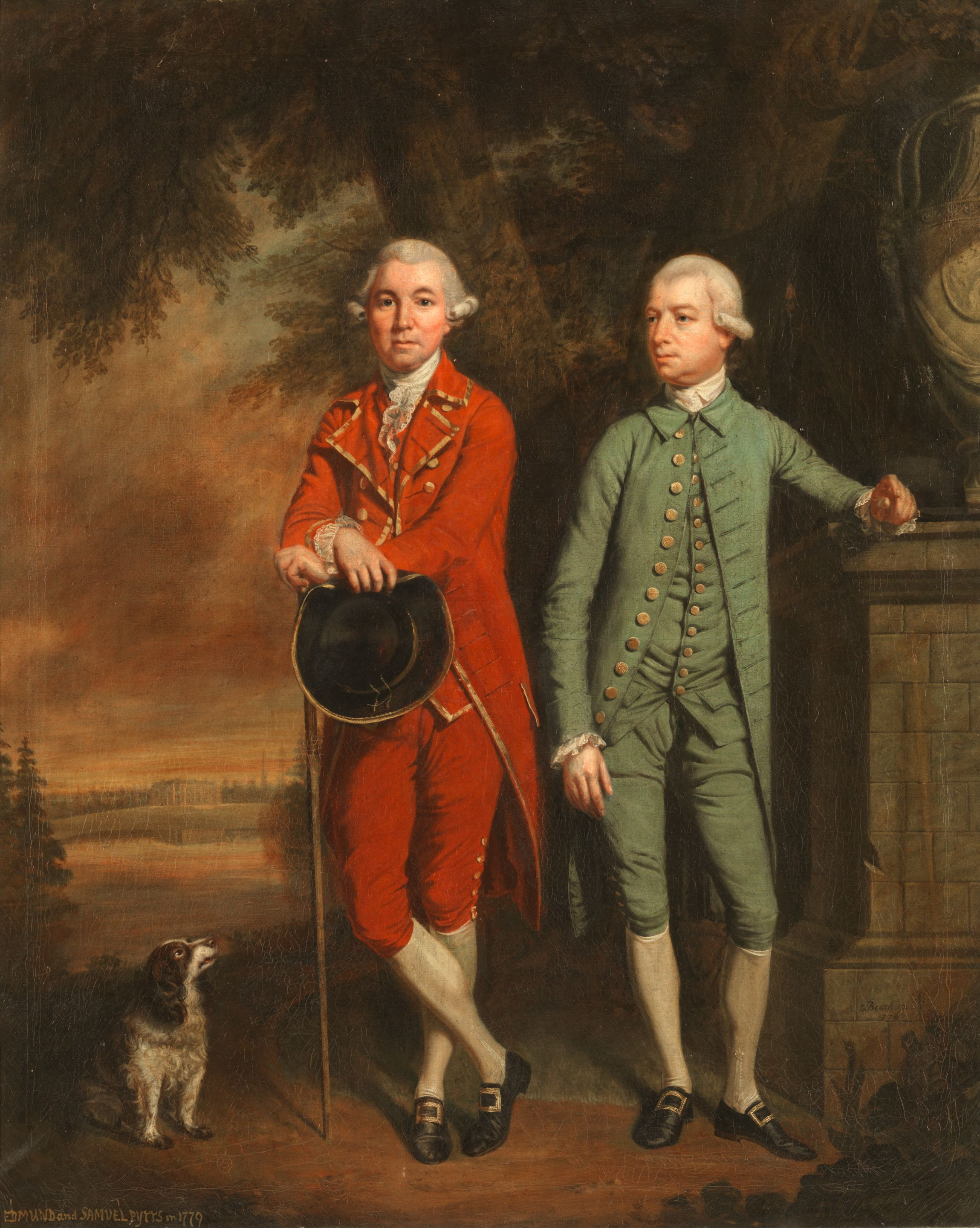
Edmund Pytts and his brother Samuel standing by a commemorative urn in parkland with a spaniel, a view of Kyre House beyond, painting by Thomas Beach, 1779.

Edmund Pytts (23 February 1729 – 13 December 1781) was a British Tory politician, MP for Worcestershire 1753–1761.

Pytts was the son of Edmund Pytts MP and Susanna Collet. He may have been educated at Eton College 1742–45, and entered Lincoln's Inn in 1745.

Pytts' grandfather Samuel Pytts and father Edmund Pytts had both served as MP for Worcestershire. Following his father's death in 1753, he was elected unopposed to succeed him in a by-election, and re-elected unopposed in 1754. He did not stand in 1761, nor in any subsequent election.

He served as the High Sheriff of Worcestershire 1771–72.

Pytts inherited the family manor at Kyre Park, Worcestershire, owned by the Pytts family since 1575. He conveyed the property to his brother Jonathan some time before his death.

He died on 13 December 1781.

Parliament of Great Britain
Preceded by Edmund Pytts (I); John Bulkeley Coventry	Member of Parliament for Worcestershire; 1753–1761; With: John Bulkeley Coventry	Succeeded by John Ward; William Dowdeswell
