= John Ward, 2nd Viscount Dudley and Ward =

British peer and politician

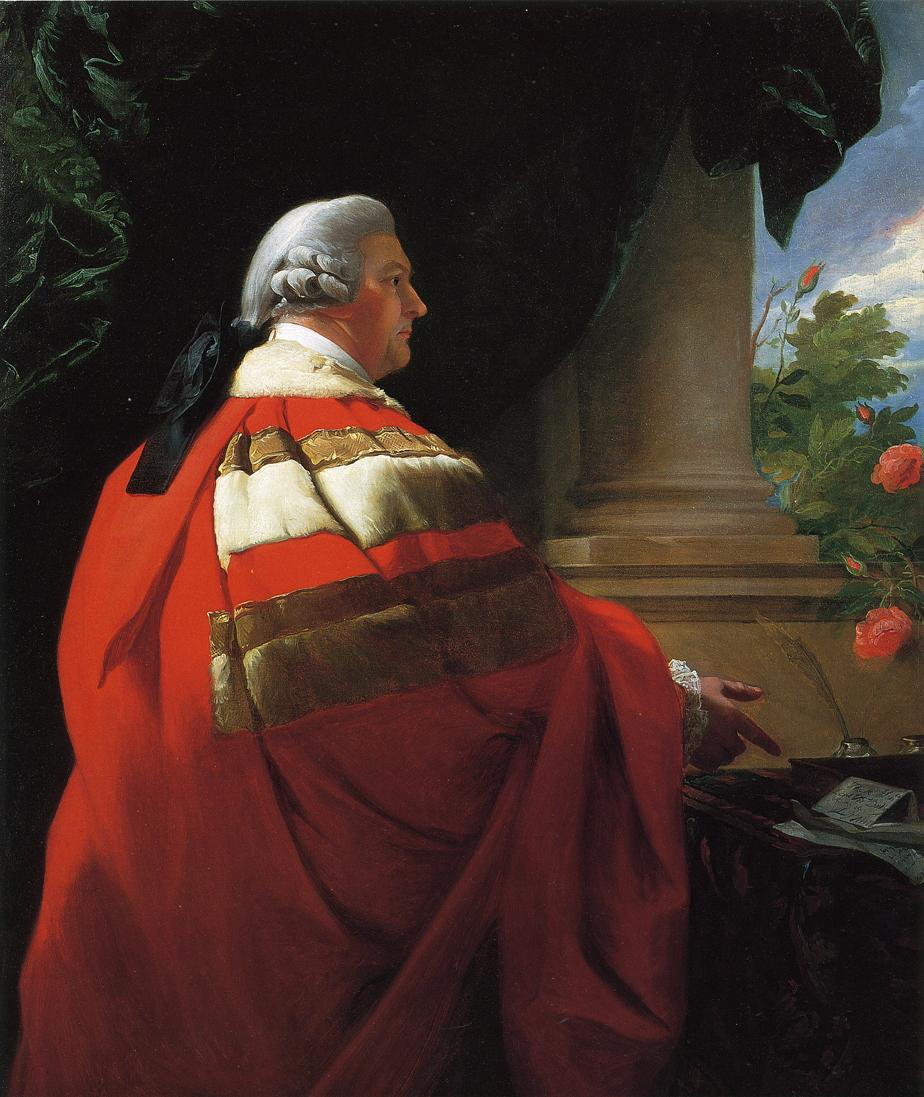
The Viscount Dudley and Ward.

John Ward, 2nd Viscount Dudley and Ward (22 February 1725 – 10 October 1788) was a British peer and politician.

He was the son of John Ward, 1st Viscount Dudley and Ward, and his first wife Anna Maria (née Bourchier) and educated at Oriel College, Oxford.

He was returned to Parliament as one of two representatives for Marlborough in 1754, a seat he held until 1761, and then represented Worcestershire until 1774. The latter year he succeeded his father in the viscountcy and entered the House of Lords. Ward married Mary Baker née Fair, daughter of Gamaliel Fair, gardener and seeds-man, who died on 17 December 1758, aged 69.

Ward died in October 1788, aged 63. As he had no sons he was succeeded in the viscountcy by his half-brother William.

== Family ==
He had a natural daughter Anna Maria Ward (1778–1837), by his Viscountess (when she was still Mrs. Mary Baker, whom he later married on 15 July 1788). Lord Dudley in his will made an ample provision for the girl and appointed his widow, who died in 1810, and Henry Jerome de Salis as her guardians. Anna Maria married Sir Horace St Paul, 1st Baronet, MP, on 14 May 1803. The widowed Viscountess married Captain James Smith R.N. on 9 December 1791.

== Notes ==
Parliament of Great Britain
Preceded by John Talbot; Sir John Hynde Cotton, Bt	Member of Parliament for Marlborough; 1754–1761; With: Sir John Hynde Cotton, Bt	Succeeded by Lord Brudenell; Robert Brudenell
Preceded by John Bulkeley Coventry; Edmund Pytts	Member of Parliament for Worcestershire; 1761–1774; With: William Dowdeswell	Succeeded by William Dowdeswell; Edward Foley
Peerage of Great Britain
Preceded by John Ward	Viscount Dudley and Ward; 1774–1788	Succeeded by William Ward
