= Sir John Pakington, 4th Baronet =

English Tory politician (1671–1727)

Sir John Pakington, 4th Baronet (1671–1727) of Westwood, near Droitwich, Worcestershire was an English Tory politician who sat in the English and British House of Commons between 1690 and 1727.

Westwood House, Worcestershire

Pakington was the only son of Sir John Pakington, 3rd Baronet and his wife Margaret Keyt, daughter of Sir John Keyt, 1st Baronet, of Ebrington, Gloucestershire. He matriculated at St John's College, Oxford in 1688. Also in 1688, he succeeded his father to the baronetcy and Westwood House. He married Frances Parker, the daughter of Sir Henry Parker, 2nd Baronet MP of Honington, Warwickshire by licence dated 28 August 1691.

Pakington was known for his Tory and High Church views. He was returned as member of parliament for Worcestershire at the 1690 general election, but did not stand in 1695. He was returned for Worcestershire in contests at the 1698 general election, the two general elections of 1701 and the 1702 English general election. Also in 1702 he was returned as MP for Aylesbury, but opted to sit for Worcestershire. He was returned for Worcestershire in a contest at the 1705 English general election and unopposed in 1708, 1710 and 1713.

Pakington was returned in a contest for Worcestershire at the 1715 British general election and unopposed at the 1722 British general election. He was appointed Recorder for Worcester in 1726, a year before to his death.

Pakington married as his second wife Hester Perrott, the daughter and heiress of Sir Herbert Perrott of Haroldston, Pembrokeshire. He died just after Parliament was dissolved on 13 August 1727. He had three daughters but no sons by his first marriage. He was succeeded as an MP and a baronet by his only son from his second marriage, Sir Herbert Pakington, 5th Baronet. In the latter part of the eighteenth century he was said to be the model for Roger de Coverley, the mildly satirical figure of the Tory gentry guyed in The Spectator, though there is little factual evidence to support this identification.

Parliament of England
Preceded by Sir James Rushout; Thomas Foley	Member of Parliament for Worcestershire; 1690–1695; With: Thomas Foley	Succeeded by Thomas Foley; Edwin Sandys
Preceded by Thomas Foley; Edwin Sandys	Member of Parliament for Worcestershire; 1698–1707; With: William Walsh 1698–1701, 1702–1705; William Bromley 1701–1702, 1705–1707	Succeeded by Parliament of Great Britain
Preceded by James Herbert; Sir Thomas Lee	Member of Parliament for Aylesbury; 1702; With: James Herbert	Succeeded by James Herbert; Simon Harcourt
Parliament of Great Britain
Preceded by Parliament of England	Member of Parliament for Worcestershire; 1707–1727; With: Sir Thomas Winford 1707–1710; Samuel Pytts 1710–1715; Thomas Vernon 1715–1720; Sir Thomas Lyttelton 1720–1727	Succeeded by Sir Thomas Lyttelton; Sir Herbert Pakington
Baronetage of England
Preceded by John Pakington	Baronet (of Ailesbury); 1688–1727	Succeeded by Herbert Pakington
