= Westwood House =

Grade I listed building in Westwood, United Kingdom

Coordinates: 52.2736°N 2.1837°W

"Westwood House consists of a square building, from each corner of which projects a wing in the form of a parallelogram, and turreted in the style of the Chateau de Madrid, Paris, or Holland House." —T.R. Nash History of Worcester.

Westwood House is a stately home in the civil parish of Westwood, near Droitwich, Worcestershire, England. It has been subdivided into twelve self-contained apartments. The house has origins as an Elizabethan banqueting hall with Caroline additions and is a Grade I listed building. It was for several centuries the seat of the Pakington family. Situated west of Droitwich, it lies in the centre of its former estate, Westwood Park, which is Grade II listed in the National Register of Historic Parks and Gardens.

With its four diagonal wings, added to the original, early-17th century house at some time later in the same century, the house's design was a precursor of the Butterfly plan which became popular in the 19th century.

== House ==
Situated on a rising ground, the house is built of red brick with stone quoins and parapets. The core of the house dates from about 1600 and is square and three storeys high; the saloon occupied the first floor, and was lighted by large bay windows. Wings project in a line from the centre of each corner of the house, and communicate, by doors on each floor, with the central building. At some distance from each wing are small square towers that were once connected by walls (since removed) to the main building.

The gatehouse is immediately in front of the house; the gate has a red brick lodge on each side of it with ornamental gables and pinnacles, and further ornamental timberwork over the gate itself. The gate between them is ornamented with the heraldic bearings of the family, the mullet or star of five points, and below them the garbs or wheat-sheaves. These bearings are also sculptured on the parapets, the wheatsheaves forming the pilasters and the mullets the balusters.

The stables and servants' offices were a short distance in the rear of the house, and the kitchen garden covers the site of the long-since-demolished convent.

== Park ==
Writing in 1891 Laura Valentine commented that the house was in the centre of a large and well-wooded park, with a lake of some size to the east, and a lovely avenues of grand old trees radiating from it. The front of the mansion commanded a view of the lake. From Windows in the library a grand view was obtained over "a most beautiful and undulating country". The lake (which occupies 60 acres (24 ha)), the radiating avenues, and the ancient oaks added to its beauty. "There is, indeed, all over Worcestershire a soft beauty of landscape that is very bewitching".

Although the house and large lake remain, the park is now a shadow of its former self. For example, the only remaining tree-lined avenue is a straight one that leads from Droitwich to the gatehouse.

== History ==
Eustachia de Say and her son Osbert FitzHugh gave the church located at Westwood to Fontevraud Abbey, in the Loire valley, where Henry II of England, his wife Queen Eleanor of Aquitaine and their son Richard I (the Lionheart) are buried. Soon afterwards, a small priory was erected at Westwood, dedicated to the Blessed Virgin Mary, for six Benedictine nuns. Over the centuries the convent grew until it ultimately numbered eighteen sisters. The last prioress, Joyce Acton, received at the dissolution an annual pension of ten pounds.

After the dissolution Henry VIII granted Westwood, with its demesne lands, to Sir John Pakington. The Pakington family seat was in the adjacent village of Hampton Lovett, but that house was burnt down during the English Civil War so they moved to Westwood. The house at Westwood was built in the reign of Elizabeth as a banqueting house by Sir John's nephew, also John Pakington (1549-1625). The house was enlarged and repaired and the park was improved.

During the latter part of the war and the Interregnum the house was the residence of Sir John Pakington (1621–1680), an ardent Royalist who was tried for his life by the Parliament; his estates were sequestered, and he was greatly plundered, but he ultimately compounded with the Parliamentary Committee for £5,000. His house was the refuge of learned men who support the King's cause: Dr. Henry Hammond found shelter with him, as did the Bishops Morley, Fell, Gunning.

There is a link between "Whole Duty of Man" (an influential and popular Anglican tract) and Westwood House, because while the author is unknown, the introduction was written by Henry Hammond, and this has led some to speculate that Sir John's wife, Dorothy, Lady Pakington, may have been the author.

During and after the Glorious Revolution the tried hospitality of Westwood House was extended to those who scrupled (ie. refused) to take the oath of allegiance to William of Orange, and Dean George Hickes wrote several of his important works at Westwood.

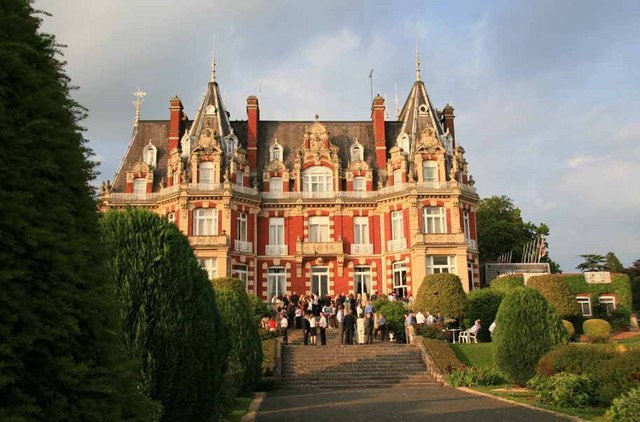
Chateau Impney, Droitwich.

In the 19th century the house was the residence of John Pakington, 1st Baron Hampton, a British Conservative politician, who before he lost his Droitwich seat in the Commons in 1874 and was raised to the peerage held a number of government posts. The man who defeated him in that election was the Liberal politician and industrialist John Corbett. He built a house in the style of a Louis XIII château. Known as Chateau Impney, it stands only about a mile away from Westwood and although it was said to be built in that style to please his Franco-Irish wife, "More relevant may have been his desire to cock a snook at his political rival, Sir John Pakington of Westwood House" (Sir Nikolaus Pevsner).

When Baron Hampton died in 1880, he would be the last of the Pakington family to live at Westwood. In 1902 his son Herbert Perrott Murray Pakington, the 3rd Baron Hampton, sold Westwood House to Edward Partington, a paper mill industrialist. Partington was created Baron Doverdale, of Westwood Park in the County of Worcester on 6 January 1917. The house and estate were divided and sold on the death of the third and last Baron Doverdale (grandson of the first baron) in 1949. All three Barons Doverdale are buried at the Parish Church of St Mary & All Saints, Hampton Lovett.

== Australian connection ==
On 23 May 1860, the first town gazetted in Queensland, Australia, by the Queensland Government was Westwood, named after Westwood House. Although the area had been shown as Prestone on the original survey plan, Queensland Governor George Bowen decided to name the town Westwood in honour of Lord John Pakington's role as Secretary of State for the Colonies in 1852.
