= Sir John Pakington, 3rd Baronet =

Westwood House, Worcestershire

Sir John Pakington, 3rd Baronet, (c. 1649 – March 1688) of Westwood House near Droitwich, Worcestershire was the only surviving son of Sir John Pakington, 2nd Baronet. Like most of his family he was a Tory and served as member of parliament for Worcestershire in James II's Parliament.

He spent a quiet life at Westwood, studying under the guidance of George Hickes, dean of Worcester, under whose tuition he became one of the finest Anglo-Saxon scholars of his time.

He died in March 1688. He had married Margaret, daughter of Sir John Keyt, 1st Baronet of Ebrington, Gloucestershire. and was succeeded by his only son, Sir John Pakington, 4th Baronet.

Parliament of England
Preceded by Thomas Foley; Bridges Nanfan	Member of Parliament for Worcestershire; 1685–1687; With: James Pytts	Succeeded by Sir James Rushout, Bt; Thomas Foley
Baronetage of England
Preceded by John Pakington	Baronet (of Ailesbury); 1680–1688	Succeeded by John Pakington
