= Hampton Lovett =

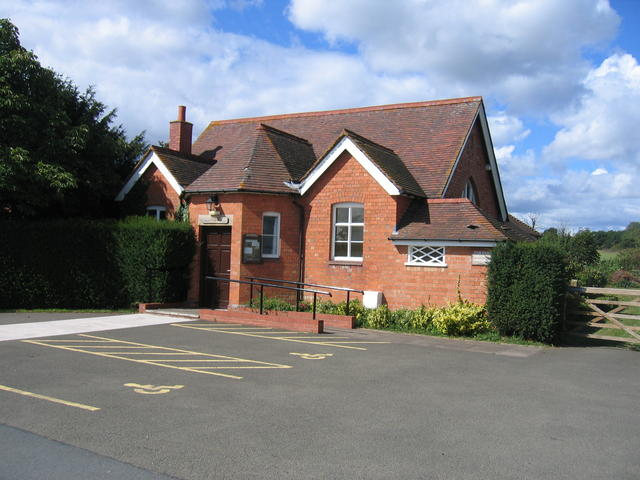
- Village hall

- Location within Worcestershire
- Population: 332 (2021)
- OS grid reference: SO887654
- District: Wychavon
- Shire county: Worcestershire
- Region: West Midlands
- Country: England
- Sovereign state: United Kingdom
- Post town: DROITWICH
- Postcode district: WR9
- Police: West Mercia
- Fire: Hereford and Worcester
- Ambulance: West Midlands
- UK Parliament: Droitwich and Evesham

Hampton Lovett is a village and civil parish in the Wychavon district of the county of Worcestershire, England. It is just north of Droitwich. The parish population was 332 in 2021. It shares a grouped parish council with the adjacent parish of Westwood.

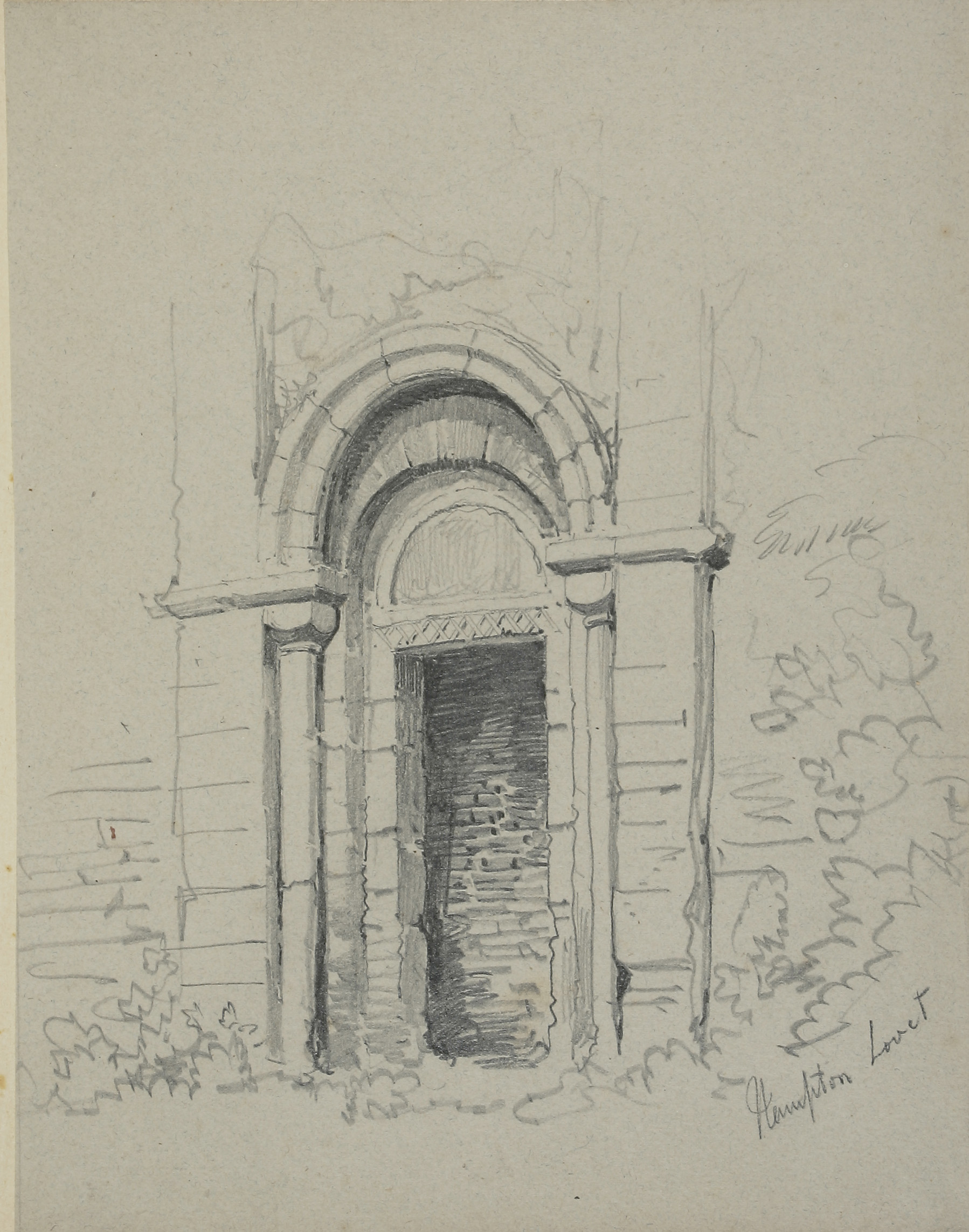
Romanesque (ie. Norman) door of the church, sketched in the nineteenth century

The church of St. Mary and All Saints is noted for its Norman features. English Heritage lists the church as a Grade I listed building.

The name Hampton derives from the Old English hāmtūn meaning 'home farm'. The affix Lovett derives from the Lovet family who held land in the village in the 13th century.

== People ==
People from Hampton Lovett include:

- Sir John Pakington (died 1551), an MP and High Sheriff.

== Burials ==
Burials at Hampton Lovett include:

- Oswald Partington, 2nd Baron Doverdale
