= Honington, Warwickshire =

Hamlet and civil parish in England

Coordinates: 52.080°N 1.615°W

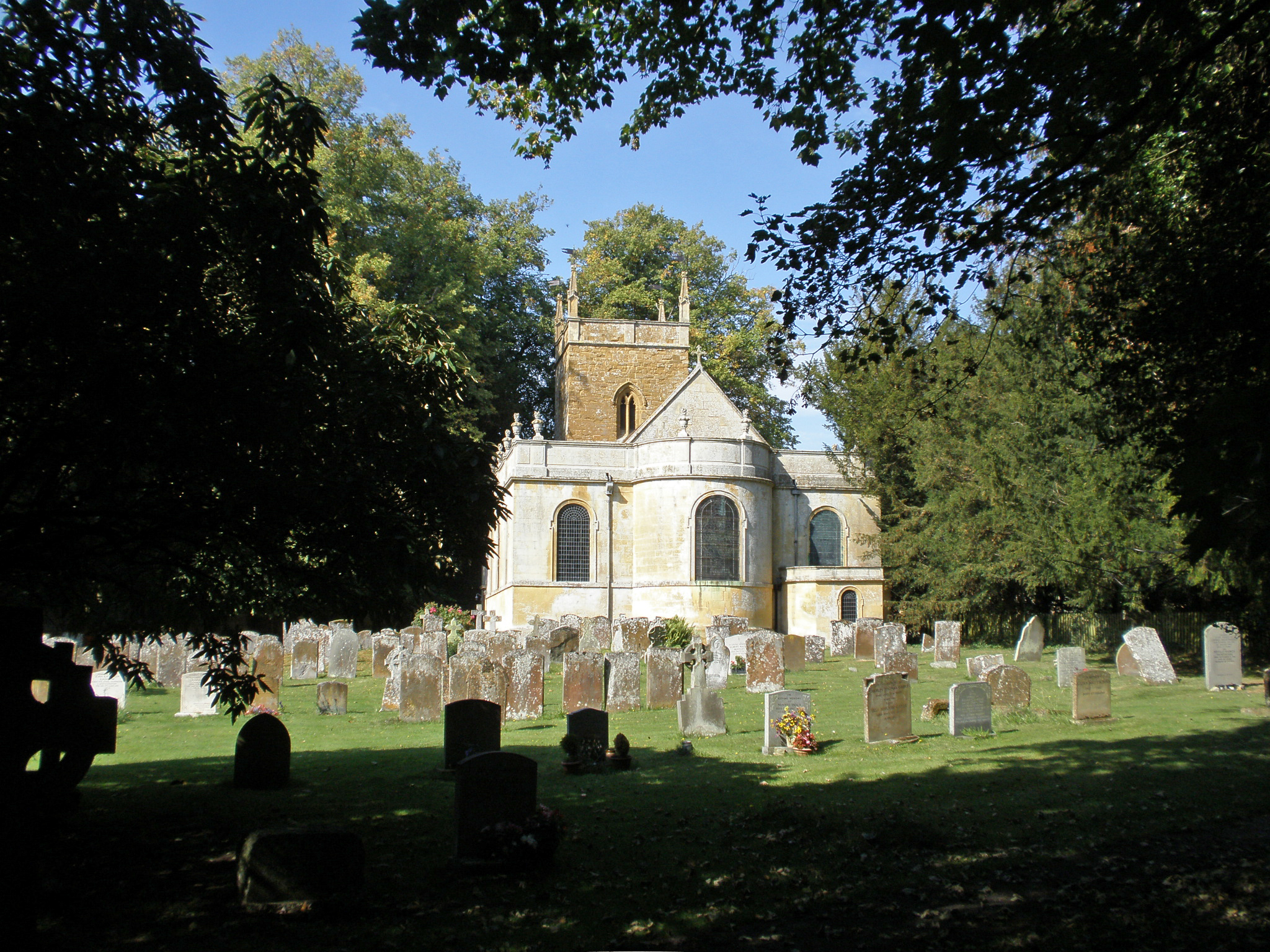
Honington All Saints churchyard

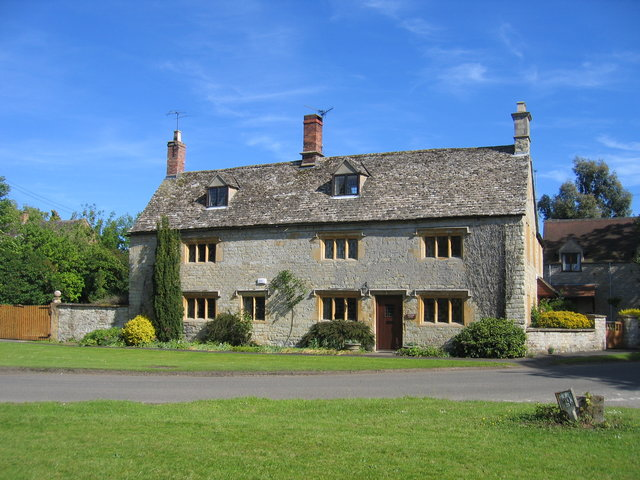
A typical house in Honington

Honington, Warwickshire is a hamlet and civil parish in the Stratford-on-Avon District of Warwickshire, England. It is in the Brailes division of the hundred of Kington, and approximately two miles north of Shipston-on-Stour. The population taken at the 2011 census was 250. The River Stour flows past the village on the western side and has a 5-arched 17th-century bridge crossing it. Honington contains approximately 60 houses within the parish boundary, including the half-timbered Magpie Cottage, and Shoemaker's Cottage situated on the Green opposite the gates and lodge entrance to Honington Hall which was built in 1682 by Sir Henry Parker. The Church of All Saints has been re-built, but retains a 13th-century tower.
