= Edmund Pytts (died 1753) =

British Tory politician

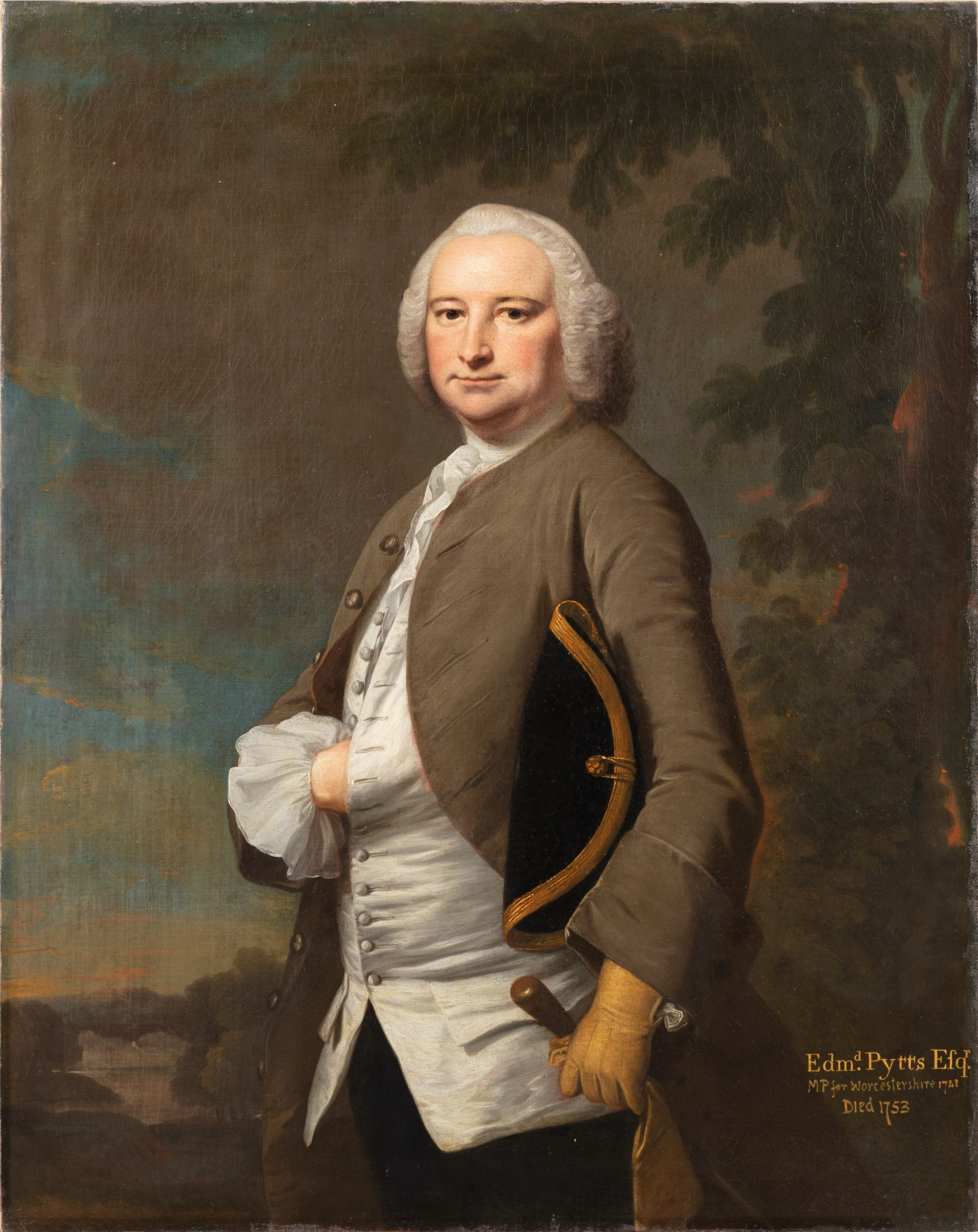
Portrait of Edmund Pytts Esq., 1741 (attributed to Joseph Highmore)

Edmund Pytts (c. 1696 – 24 November 1753) was a British Tory politician, MP for Worcestershire 1741–1753.

Pytts was the son of Samuel Pytts MP and Frances Sandys, the daughter of Samuel Sandys MP. He matriculated at Balliol College, Oxford in 1713, aged 16. Pytts stood unsuccessfully at Ludlow in 1727. He was elected MP for Worcestershire in 1741, and re-elected unopposed in 1747. A Tory, he voted against the government in all recorded votes.

== Personal life ==
On 24 January 1727, Pytts married Susanna, daughter of Jonathan Collet. She died on 2 April 1742. They had four sons and four daughters, including Edmund Pytts MP. On 12 December 1752, he married Anne, daughter of Sir Streynsham Master and widow of Gilbert Coventry, 4th Earl of Coventry.

== Death ==
He died on 24 November 1753.

Parliament of Great Britain
Preceded by Sir Herbert Pakington, Bt; Edmund Lechmere	Member of Parliament for Worcestershire; 1741–1753; With: Edmund Lechmere; Viscount Deerhurst; John Bulkeley Coventry	Succeeded by Edmund Pytts (II); John Bulkeley Coventry
