= Joseph Townsend (MP) =

English politician

Joseph Townsend (1704–1763) of Honington, Warwickshire was an English politician who sat in the House of Commons between 1740 and 1754.

== Family ==
Townsend was born in 1704, the first son (but not heir) of brewer Joseph Townsend (d. 1728) of Winchester Street, London, by his first wife, Mary Shipsey. His father left him only an annuity of £200 but on the death of his younger half-brother, Thomas Beacon Townsend (d. 1737), he was enabled to marry and buy Honington Hall. On 11 October 1737, he married Judith, daughter of John Gore (d. 1763), British MP for Great Grimsby of Bush Hill, Middlesex.

== Career ==
Townsend was elected as one of the two members of parliament for Wallingford on 22 December 1740. In 1741 he became one of the members for Westbury (a seat later held by his cousin Chauncy Townsend). In 1747 he was again returned from the Wallingford constituency, serving until 1754. He died on 8 July 1763.
