= Sir Henry Parker, 2nd Baronet =

English politician

Sir Henry Parker Bt
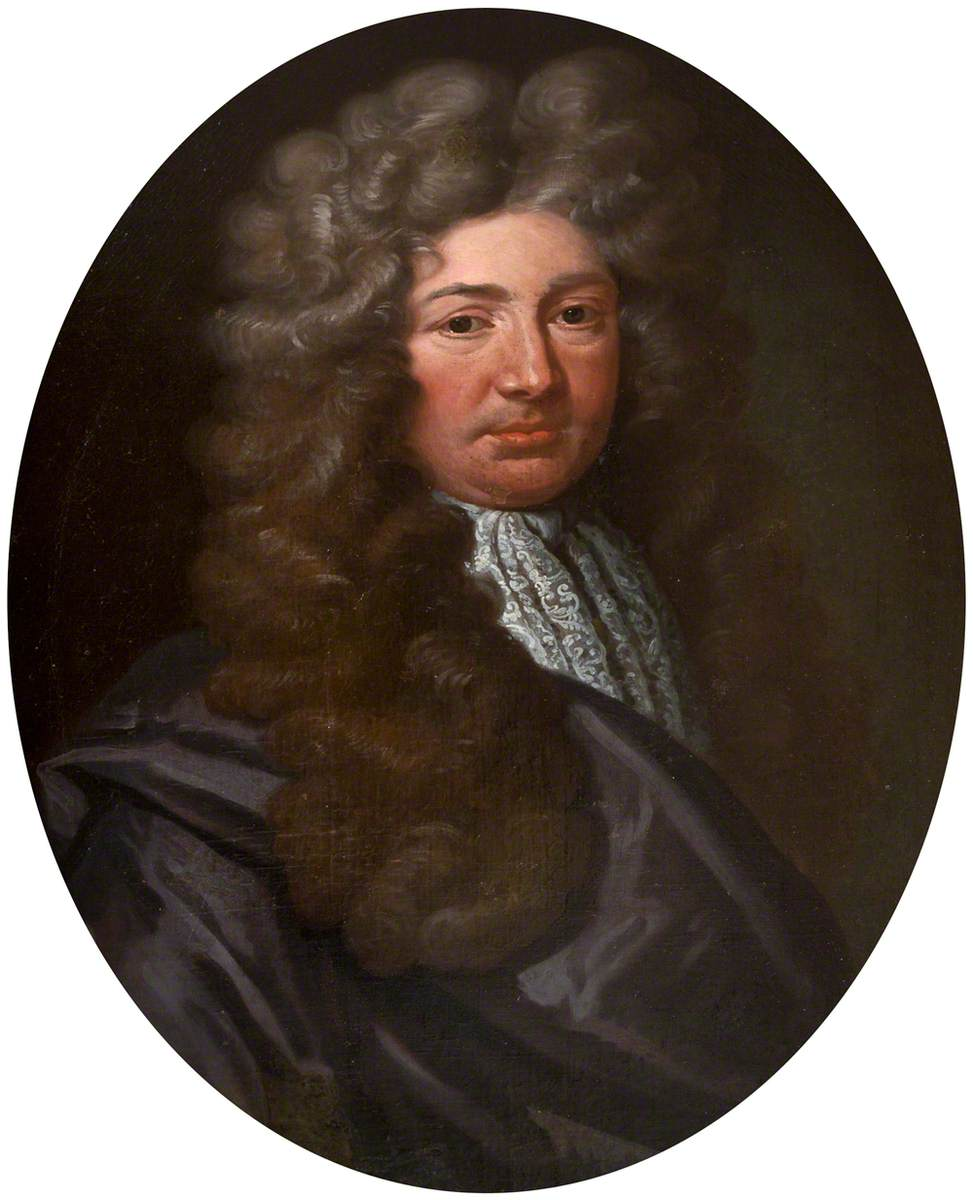
- Sir Henry Parker, 2nd Baronet

Member of Parliament for Evesham
- In office 1679–1681

Member of Parliament for Evesham
- In office 1685–1690

Member of Parliament for Evesham
- In office 1695–1701

Member of Parliament for Aylesbury
- In office 1704–1705

Personal details
- Born: 25 July 1638
- Died: 25 October 1713 (aged 75)

Sir Henry Parker, 2nd Baronet (25 July 1638 – 25 October 1713), of Honington, Warwickshire, was an English politician. He was a Member (MP) of the Parliament of England for Evesham in March 1679 – January 1681, 1685–1687, 1689–1690 and 1695–1700, and for Aylesbury in 24 November 1704 – 1705.

== Early life ==
Henry Parker was born on 25 July 1638, the eldest son of Henry Parker, a painter-stainer, and Margaret née White, who lived in Fleet Street and at Little Grove. He was educated at Merchant Taylors' School from 1650 and enrolled at Inner Temple in 1658 to become a lawyer. He became a clerk of assize on the Oxford Circuit in November 1660 and by 1663 had become successful enough to purchase property at Talton in Worcestershire and Honington in Warwickshire, where he began rebuilding a manor house. On 29 March 1665 he married Mary Hyde, the daughter of Alexander Hyde, the Bishop of Salisbury. The couple would go on to have five sons and five daughters. In the following year Parker was called to the bar, and he succeeded to his father's estates in 1670 upon his death. Parker was appointed recorder at Evesham in 1672 and relinquished his position as clerk of assize for Oxford in 1674.

== Political career ==
Parker was elected to the Exclusion Bill Parliament as the Member for Evesham in March 1679 and served until it was dissolved in January 1681. He was then re-elected in 1685 to serve in James II's Loyal Parliament and was returned for Evesham again in 1689 for the Convention Parliament. In 1690 the 2nd Parliament of King William III and Queen Mary II was called but Parker's campaign for a third re-election was unsuccessful and he removed himself from the contest a few days before the poll for Evesham was completed.

In his absence from parliament after this, Parker served as a Justice of the Peace for Worcestershire and Warwickshire, where his estates were located, and was also a deputy lieutenant. Through his wife Parker was related to Edward Hyde, 3rd Earl of Clarendon and in April 1691 he visited Clarendon who was at the time imprisoned for his support for Anne over William and Mary. Parker then went on to serve as the temporary steward to George Compton, 4th Earl of Northampton and may have begun a legal practice while out of parliamentary office as well.

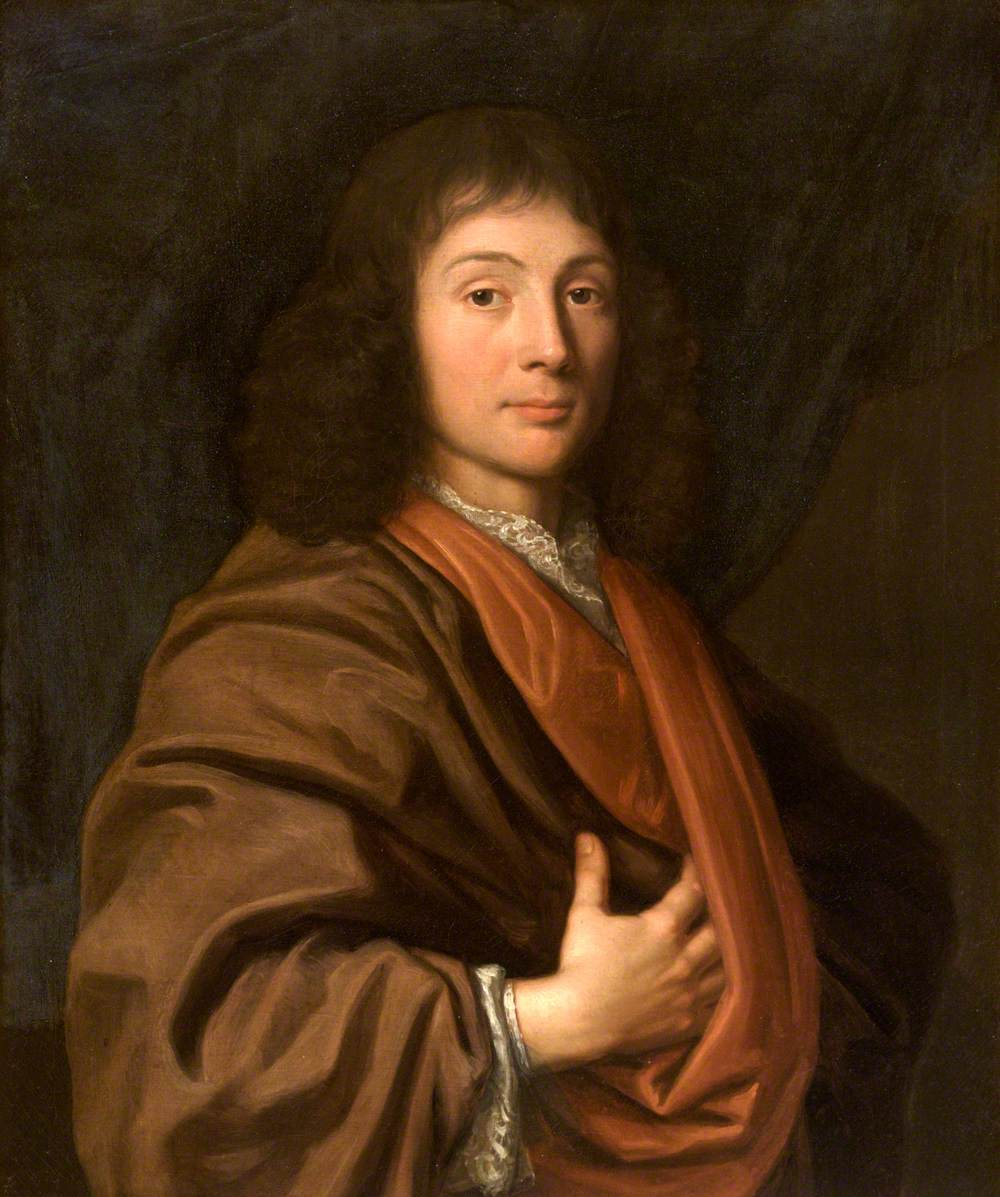
Parker in the late 1690s

The 3rd Parliament of King William III was called in 1695 and Parker found himself in a much stronger position in the voting at Evesham. Despite the constituents being able to vote for two candidates, Parker's supporters chose to vote only for him which gave him an advantage over his competitor, Sir Rushout Cullen, 3rd Baronet, who he subsequently emerged victorious over. Parker was not a very active member in the parliament, voting only occasionally, but he refused to sign the Association of 1696 in February of that year. He left London for a period of leave on 17 December after his daughter Frances, who had married Sir John Pakington, 4th Baronet, died. In March 1697 his uncle Sir Hugh Parker, 1st Baronet died and Parker inherited his baronetcy as well as a large proportion of his estates. He returned for the third session of the parliament in 1698 and worked on a committee considering a petition of the Worcestershire glass manufacturers, and then made an investigations into tax grievances in the Broadway hundred.

Parker's work on these issues made him popular with his constituents and he was re-elected for Evesham for the 4th Parliament of King William III later in the same year, described at the time as a "Country" supporter. When the 5th Parliament of King William III was called in 1701 Parker chose not to run for re-election again and concentrated on matters closer to home, being elected a deputy lieutenant for Warwickshire. In December the 6th Parliament of King William III was called but again Parker chose not to participate, and he instead supported the successful candidacy of his son Hugh for the Evesham seat. Parker became a deputy lieutenant for Warwickshire again in 1703.

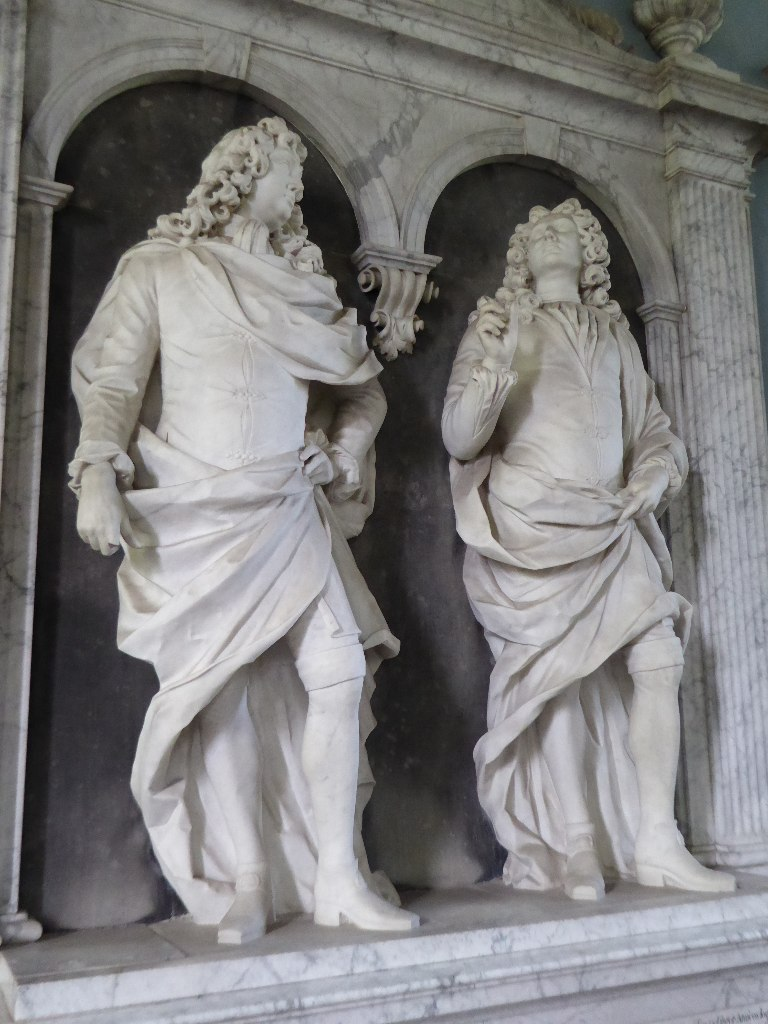
Monument to Parker and his son Hugh, in Honington Church, Warwickshire

Having placed his son in the Evesham seat, Parker could no longer rely on it for his own political role and instead relied on his son-in-law Pakington. In 1704 one of the members for the seat controlled by Pakington, Aylesbury (UK Parliament constituency), died, and a by election was called. Pakington supported Parker to be the replacement and was elected on 24 November, in time to vote in support of the Tack of the Occasional Conformity Bill four days later. The 1st Parliament of Queen Anne was Parker's last as he chose to not contest the 1705 general election. Despite this he continued to have a say in local politics; he supported the parliamentary candidacies of William Bromley in 1705 and Sir Thomas Cookes Winford, 2nd Baronet (another son-in-law) in 1707, and it was estimated that he controlled between 60 and 80 votes. In retirement Parker bought the manor of Tredington and also spent time at his house in Devonshire Street. He died on 25 October 1713 and was buried at Honington Church.

== Citations ==
Parliament of England
Preceded by Sir John Hanmer, Bt; Sir James Rushout, Bt	Member of Parliament for Evesham; 1679–1681; With: Sir James Rushout, Bt	Succeeded by Sir James Rushout, Bt; Edward Rudge
Preceded by Sir James Rushout, Bt; Edward Rudge	Member of Parliament for Evesham; 1685–1690; With: Sir John Matthewes	Succeeded by Sir James Rushout, Bt; Edward Rudge
Preceded by Edward Rudge; Sir James Rushout, Bt	Member of Parliament for Evesham; 1695–1701; With: Sir James Rushout, Bt; John Rudge	Succeeded by John Rudge; Sir James Rushout, Bt
Preceded by Simon Harcourt; James Herbert	Member of Parliament for Aylesbury; 1704–1705; With: Simon Harcourt	Succeeded by Simon Mayne; Sir John Wittewronge, Bt
Baronetage of England
Preceded by Hugh Parker	Baronet (of Melford Hall); 1697–1713	Succeeded by Henry Parker
