= Honington Hall =

Country house in Warwickshire, England

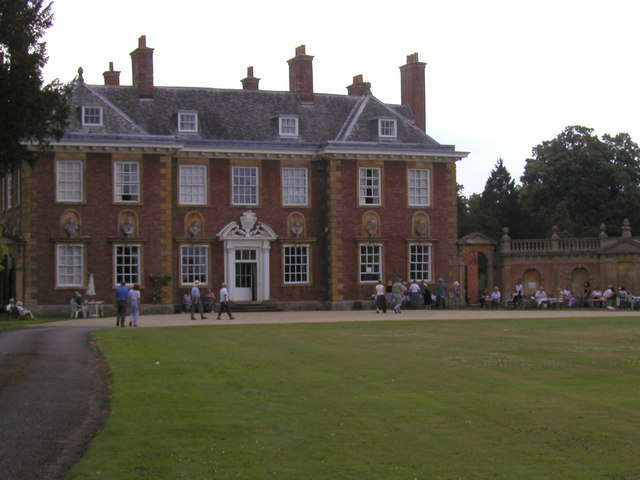
- Interactive map of Honington Hall
- 52.0820°N 1.6206°W
- Location: Honington, Warwickshire, England

Listed Building – Grade I
- Official name: Honington Hall and attached gateways, walls and temple
- Designated: 2 September 1952
- Reference no.: 1024327

Listed Building – Grade II
- Official name: Honington Hall, Dovecote approximately 200 metres north
- Designated: 2 September 1952
- Reference no.: 1024329

Listed Building – Grade II
- Official name: Honington Hall, Stables approximately 5 metres north
- Designated: 2 September 1952
- Reference no.: 1024335

Listed Building – Grade II
- Official name: Honington Hall, Stabling approximately 250 metres north
- Designated: 2 September 1952
- Reference no.: 1185839

National Register of Historic Parks and Gardens
- Official name: Honington Hall
- Type: Grade II*
- Designated: 1 February 1986
- Reference no.: 1001189

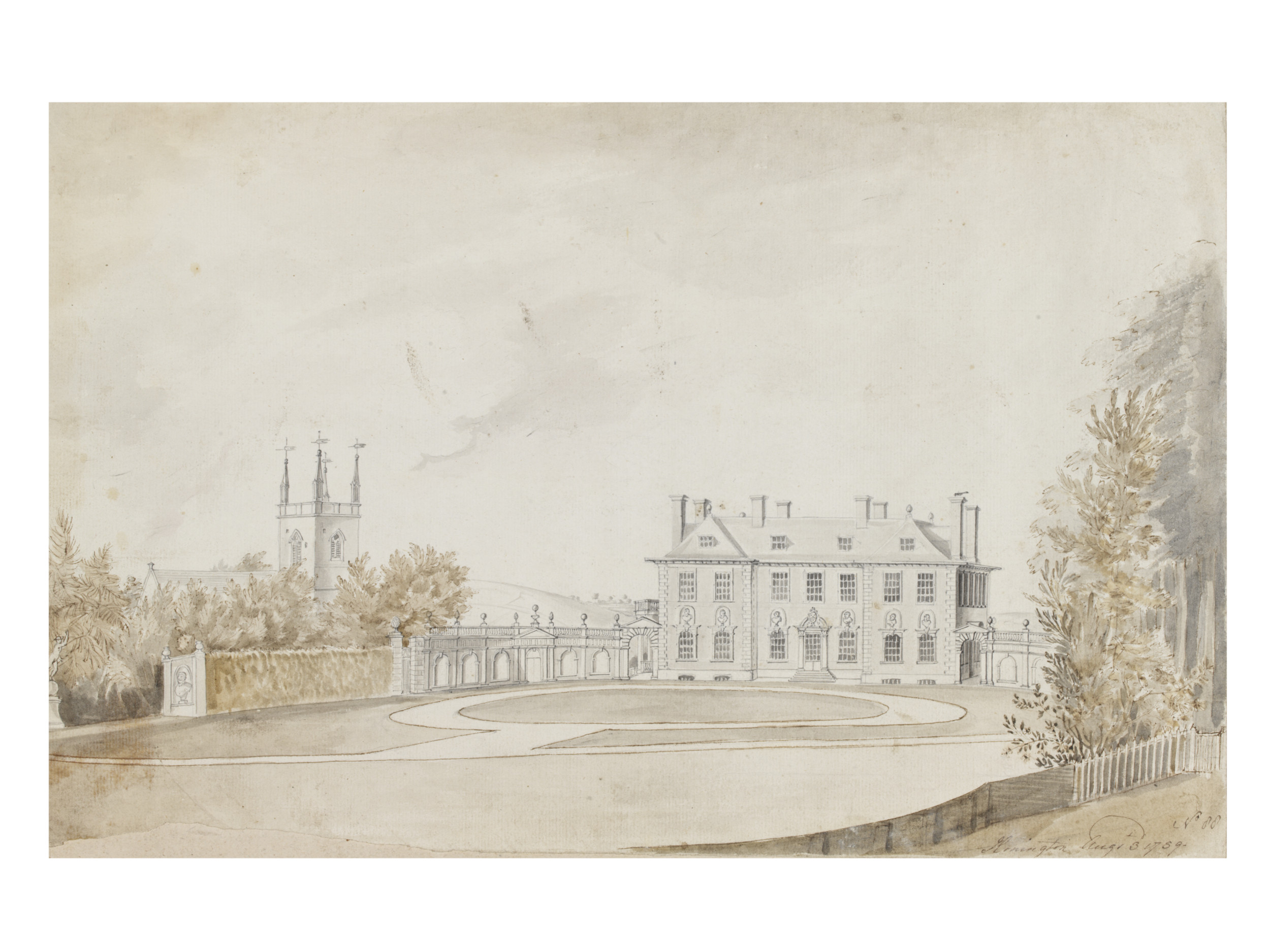
Honington Hall, Warwickshire, by Thomas Robins, c. 1748.

Honington Hall is a privately owned 17th century country house at Honington, near Stratford on Avon, Warwickshire. It has Grade I listed building status.

The Manor of Honington was in the ownership of the Priory of Coventry until the Dissolution of the Monasteries in the 16th century. In 1540 it was granted by the Crown to Robert Gibbes. The estate was sold by the Gibbes family in about 1670 to Henry Parker who in 1696 succeeded to the Parker Baronetcy and an estate at Melford Hall, Suffolk.

The present house was built by Parker in 1682 but was sold by Parker's grandson in 1737 to Joseph Townsend who carried out considerable alterations and extensions in the mid 18th century. The Georgian style house has a number of fine features including round headed niches over the ground floor windows of the east front which contain busts of Roman Emperors.

The Townsends held the estate until 1905 when it passed by marriage to Sir Grey Skipwith Bt (see Skipwith baronets). Later the estate became the seat of the Wiggin family.

The house is not generally open to the public but may be available for visitations by prior group arrangements.

== References and sources ==
Sources

- A History of the County of Warwick, Volume 5 (1949) pp. 92-95 from British History Online
- "Historic Houses Association".
