= Samuel Pytts =

English politician

Samuel Pytts (c. 1674 – 15 January 1729) was an English politician, MP for Hereford and Worcestershire.

Pytts was the son of James Pytts of Wick, Worcestershire and his wife Catherine Cliffe of Malvern. He matriculated at New College, Oxford in 1689, aged 15.

In December 1699, Pytts was elected MP for Hereford in a by-election following the death of Paul Foley MP. In January 1701, Pytts was defeated, Paul Foley's son Thomas Foley taking the seat. in November 1701 Pytts stood at Hereford again, but gave up after a disastrous first day.

He served as High Sheriff of Worcestershire 1704–5, and became a freeman of Worcester in 1714.

He was elected knight of the shire for Worcestershire in 1710, re-elected in 1713. He was appointed a Lord of Trade by the Earl of Oxford in September 1713, holding office until December 1714.

He lost his seat at Worcestershire to Thomas Vernon in 1715, and did not stand for parliament again.

He died on 15 January 1729.

== Family ==
Pytts married three times:

1. Frances Sandys, daughter of Samuel Sandys MP, married on 20 January 1690. They had two sons.
  - Edmund Pytts MP
  - a son, predeceased father
2. Catherine Rushout, daughter of Sir James Rushout Bt MP. They had one daughter.
  - Catherine Pytts, married William Lacon Childe MP
3. Catherine Nanfan, daughter of Bridges Nanfan MP, married on 24 November 1720. Catherine was the widow of Richard Coote, 1st Earl of Bellomont and Admiral William Caldwell.

Parliament of England
| Preceded by Hon. James Brydges; Paul Foley | Member of Parliament for Hereford; 1699–1701; With: Hon. James Brydges | Succeeded by Hon. James Brydges; Thomas Foley |
Parliament of Great Britain
| Preceded by Sir John Pakington, Bt; Sir Thomas Winford, Bt | Member of Parliament for Worcestershire; 1710–1715; With: Sir John Pakington, Bt | Succeeded by Sir John Pakington, Bt; Thomas Vernon |
