= Sir John Pakington, 2nd Baronet =

English politician

Sir John Pakington, 2nd Baronet (13 August 1621 – 1680) of Westwood House, near Droitwich, Worcestershire was an English politician who sat in the House of Commons at various times between 1640 and 1679. He supported the Royalist cause in the English Civil War.

== Biography ==
Westwood House, Worcestershire

He was the son of Sir John Pakington, 1st Baronet and his wife Frances Ferrers, the daughter of Sir John Ferrers of Tamworth. His father and grandfather died when he was very young and he became the ward of Thomas Coventry, later Lord Coventry. He succeeded his father to the baronetcy in 1624 and his grandfather to his Westwood estate in 1625.

In April 1640, Pakington was elected member of parliament for Worcestershire in the Short Parliament. He was elected MP for Aylesbury for the Long Parliament in November 1640. He was disabled from sitting on 20 August 1642 for executing a commission of array for Charles I. He served the King during the English Civil War but was captured and imprisoned in the Tower of London. He appeared at the muster before the Battle of Worcester, and was in consequence tried for treason, but no one would testify against him, probably because he had been captured by the Scots. He was nevertheless fined again.

After the Restoration Pakington was again a justice of the peace. In 1661, he was re-elected MP for Worcestershire in the Cavalier Parliament and sat until 1679. He was instrumental in opposing an alleged plot by Andrew Yarranton and other Presbyterians, though they claimed (apparently successfully) that the plot was fabricated.

Pakington died at the age of 58.

== Family ==
Pakington married Dorothy Coventry, daughter of his guardian Lord Coventry, with whom he had one son and two daughters. He was succeeded by his son Sir John Pakington, 3rd Baronet

Parliament of England
Parliament suspended since 1629	Member of Parliament for Worcestershire; With: Sir Thomas Lyttelton	Succeeded by John Wilde; Humphrey Salwey
Preceded by Clement Coke; Sir Edmund Verney	Member of Parliament for Aylesbury; With: Ralph Verney	Succeeded by Thomas Scot; Simon Mayne
Preceded by Henry Bromley; John Talbot	Member of Parliament for Worcestershire; 1661–1679; With: Samuel Sandys	Succeeded by Samuel Sandys; Thomas Foley
Baronetage of England
Preceded by John Pakington	Baronet (of Ailesbury); 1624–1680	Succeeded by John Pakington
