= Dorothy, Lady Pakington =

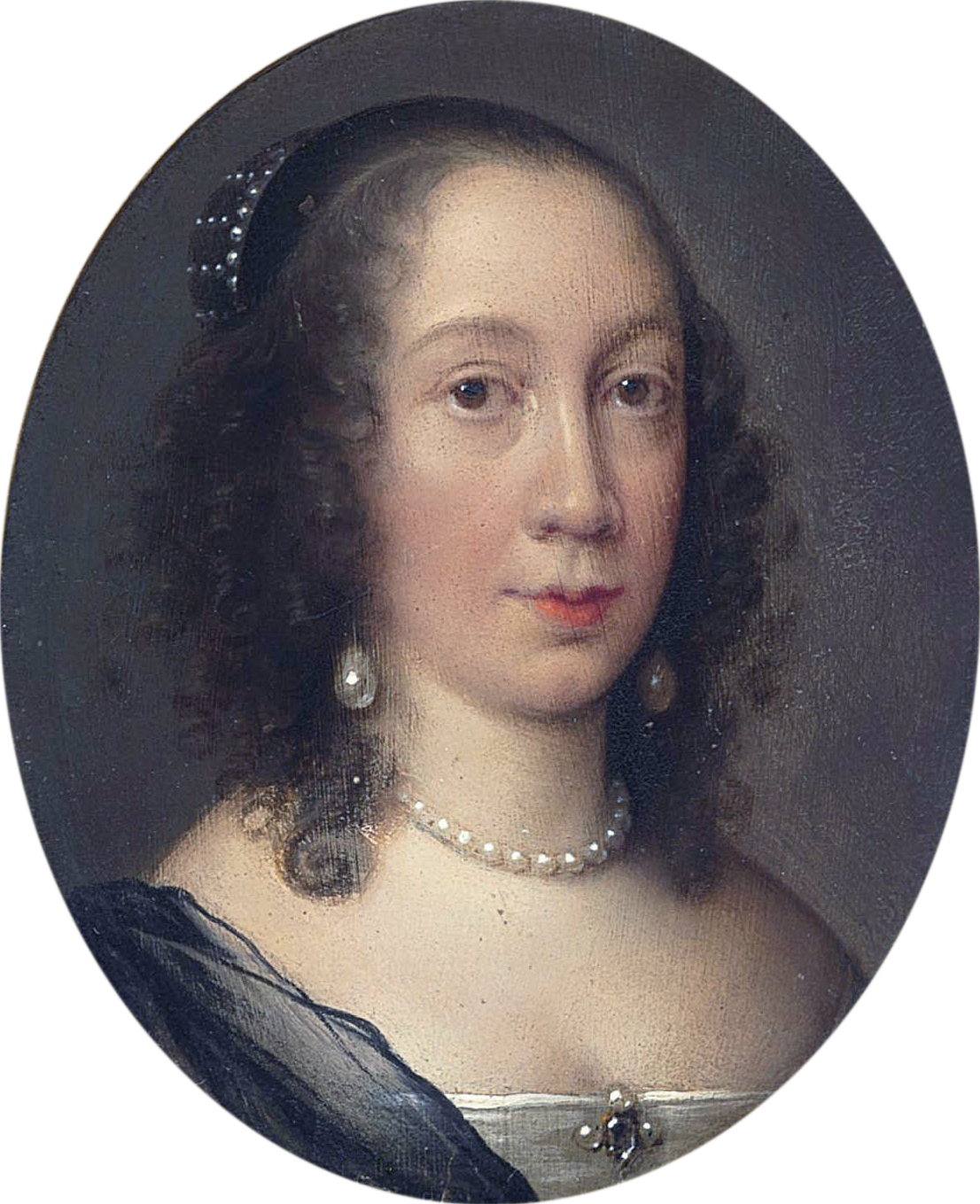
- painting by Cornelis Janssens van Ceulen
- Born: Dorothy Coventry; 1623 in or near London, England
- Died: 10 May 1679 (aged 55–56)
- Occupation: writer
- Spouse: Sir John Pakington, 2nd Baronet
- Relatives: Sir Thomas Coventry (father)
- Writing career
- Language: English
- Subject: religious works

Dorothy, Lady Pakington (1623 – 10 May 1679) was an English friend and supporter of learned clergymen, and a writer of religious works. She was for many years reputed to be the author of The Whole Duty of Man. She enjoyed the esteem and friendship of the most eminent divines of her time. Dr. Henry Hammond resided at her home for several years.

== Early years ==
Dorothy Coventry was born in or near London about the middle of the reign of James I. She was the daughter of Sir Thomas Coventry, the Lord Keeper, and his second wife, Elizabeth (1583–1653), daughter of John Aldersey of Spurstow, Cheshire, and widow of William Pitchford.

== Career ==
She married Sir John Pakington, 2nd Baronet (1621–1680), of Westwood, Worcestershire. The couple had at least three surviving children: one son and two daughters.

A fervent royalist, Dorothy Pakington wrote manuscript prayers, and shared in the circulation of religious and philosophical manuscripts in the group of clergymen around the king's chaplain, Henry Hammond. The extent of her reputation is shown by the fact that contemporaries believed her the author of The Whole Duty of Man. Although George Ballard defended this attribution, modern scholars instead follow two nineteenth-century writers — Richard Barham and C. E. Doble — who attributed the work to Hammond's friend Richard Allestree. She led a retired life, and devoted herself to learning, piety, and good works. She was the author of several religious books: The Gentleman’s Calling, The Lady’s Calling, The Government of the Tongue, The Christian’s Birthright, and The Causes of the Decay of Christian Piety.

Pakington died 10 May 1679.
