= Birtsmorton =

Coordinates: 52.01759°N 2.29108°W

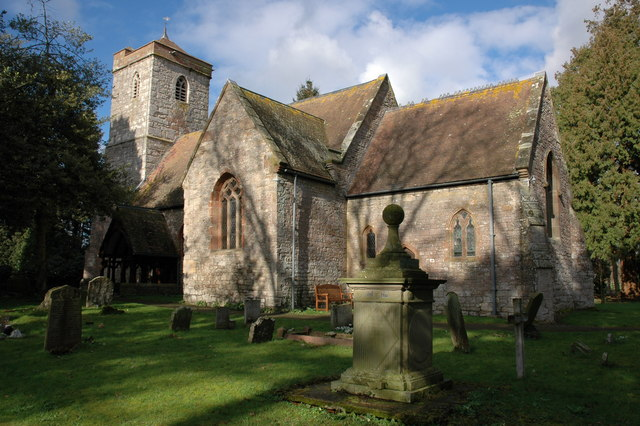
- Birtsmorton Church

- Location within Worcestershire
- Population: 257
- OS grid reference: SO799355
  - London: 100 miles (160 km)
- Civil parish: Birtsmorton
- District: Malvern Hills
- Shire county: Worcestershire
- Region: West Midlands
- Country: England
- Sovereign state: United Kingdom
- Post town: MALVERN
- Postcode district: WR13
- Dialling code: 01684
- Police: West Mercia
- Fire: Hereford and Worcester
- Ambulance: West Midlands
- UK Parliament: West Worcestershire

Birtsmorton is a village and civil parish in the Malvern Hills of Worcestershire, England, which at the 2021 census had a population of 257. It is in the south-west of the county, not far from the borders with Herefordshire and Gloucestershire.

== History ==
The church is dedicated to Saints Peter and Paul and dates from the 14th century. There is a large manor house, Birtsmorton Court, which is used today as a wedding venue. It was the home for many centuries of the Nanfan family, some of whose tombs are in the church.

In 1703, the Rev. Samuel Juice, a former rector, endowed a village school in Rye Street.

Birtsmorton was the birthplace of the chairmaker Philip Clissett who lived in the parish from his birth in 1817 until about 1842.

== Toponymy ==
The village belonged to the Le Bret family from the 12th century onwards. Bret means Breton. The same family name is associated with Westonbirt House near Tetbury, Gloucestershire. The name Morton derives from the Old English mōrtūn meaning 'settlement on the moor'.
