= James Rushout =

English landowner and politician

Sir James Rushout, 1st Baronet (22 March 1644 – 16 February 1698), of Northwick Park, Gloucestershire (formerly part of Worcestershire), was an English landowner and politician who sat in the House of Commons between 1670 and 1698.

== Early life ==
Rushout was the fifth but only surviving son of John Rushout, Fishmonger, of St Dionis Backchurch, London and Maylords and his first wife, Anne Godschalk, daughter of Joas Godschalk, merchant, of Fenchurch Street, London. He succeeded his father in 1653.

He matriculated at Christ Church, Oxford in 1660 and was awarded MA in 1661. He was made a Baronet at the young age of 17 on 17 June 1661.

== Career ==
Rushout was returned as Member of Parliament for Evesham at a by-election on 22 February 1670 and sat until 1685. He bought Northwick Park in 1683 and carried out extensive remodelling of the mansion house in 1686. At the 1689 English general election he was returned as MP for Worcestershire. He returned to Evesham at the 1690 English general election. In 1697 he was Lieutenant-Colonel of the Worcestershire Militia. In April 1697, he was nominated by the king to be ambassador at Constantinople, but died before he could take up the appointment.

== Personal life ==
In 1670, he married Alice Palmer, widow of Edward Palmer MP of the Middle Temple and daughter of Edmund Pitt of Sudbury Court, Harrow, Middlesex. Together, they had five sons and four daughters:

- William Rushout
- Alice Rushout, who married Edwin Sandys MP
- Catherine Rushout, who married Samuel Pytts MP
- Sir James Rushout Bt MP, who married Arabella Vernon, daughter of Sir Thomas Vernon.
- William Rushout
- Jane Rushout
- Elizabeth Rushout, who married firstly Sir George Thorold Bt, secondly George Compton, 4th Earl of Northampton
- Sir John Rushout Bt MP
- George Rushout

Rushout died on 16 February 1698, aged 53. He was succeeded in the baronetcy by his eldest son James, and subsequently by his fourth son John, both of whom in turn inherited Northwick Park.

Parliament of England
Preceded by William Sandys; Sir John Hanmer	Member of Parliament for Evesham; 1670–1685; With: Sir John Hanmer to 1679; Henry Parker 1679–1681; Edward Rudge 1681–1685	Succeeded by Henry Parker; John Matthewes
Preceded by Sir John Pakington, Bt; James Pytts	Member of Parliament for Worcestershire; 1689–1690; With: Thomas Foley	Succeeded by Sir John Pakington, Bt; Thomas Foley
Preceded by Henry Parker; John Matthewes	Member of Parliament for Evesham; 1690–1698; With: Edward Rudge to 1695; Henry Parker from 1695	Succeeded by John Rudge; Henry Parker
Baronetage of England
New creation	Baronet of Milnst, Essex; 1661–1698	Succeeded by James Rushout
