= Pakington baronets =

Baronetcy in the Baronetage of the United Kingdom

There have been two baronetcies created for persons with the surname Pakington, one in the Baronetage of England and one in the Baronetage of the United Kingdom. The latter is extant as of 2023.

The Pakington baronetcy, of Ailesbury in the County of Buckingham, was created in the Baronetage of England on 22 June 1620 for John Pakington, subsequently Member of Parliament for Aylesbury. The second Baronet represented Worcestershire and Aylesbury in the House of Commons. The third, fourth and fifth Baronets all sat as Members of Parliament for Worcestershire. The title became extinct on the death of the eighth Baronet in 1830. The Pakington estates were passed on to the late Baronet's nephew, John Russell, who assumed the surname of Pakington and was created a baronet in 1848 (see below).

The Pakington baronetcy, of Westwood in the County of Worcester, was created in the Baronetage of the United Kingdom on 13 July 1846 for John Pakington. Born John Russell, he was the son of William Russell and his wife Elizabeth, eldest daughter of the seventh Baronet of the 1620 creation, and assumed the surname of Pakington in lieu of his patronymic on succeeding to the Pakington estates in 1830. In 1874 he was elevated to the peerage as Baron Hampton. For more information on this creation, see this title.

== Ancestors ==
- Sir Robert Pakington, Member of Parliament for London in the time of Henry VIII, murdered 1537.
- Sir Thomas Pakington, High Sheriff of Worcestershire in 1561, died 1571.
- John Pakington (1549–1625)

== Pakington baronets, of Ailesbury (1620) ==
Escutcheon of the Pakington baronets of Ailesbury

- Sir John Pakington, 1st Baronet (c. 1600–1624)
- Sir John Pakington, 2nd Baronet (c. 1621–1680)
- Sir John Pakington, 3rd Baronet (c. 1649–1688)
- Sir John Pakington, 4th Baronet (1671–1727)
- Sir Herbert Perrott Pakington, 5th Baronet (c. 1701–1748)
- Sir John Pakington, 6th Baronet (c. 1722–1762)
- Sir Herbert Perrott Pakington, 7th Baronet (died 1795)
- Sir John Pakington, 8th Baronet (1760–1830)

== Pakington baronets, of Westwood (1846) ==
- see the Baron Hampton
