= Sir John Pakington, 1st Baronet =

English baronet and MP (1600–1624)

Sir John Pakington, 1st Baronet (1600–1624) was an English baronet and M.P. for Aylesbury in 1623–24.

== Biography ==
John was the only son of John Pakington (died 1625). He was created a baronet in June 1620, and sat in Parliament for Aylesbury in 1623–1624. Pakington died in October 1624, and was buried at Aylesbury. He predeceased his father by some months, and so on the death of his father, his father's estates were inherited by the 1st Baronet's son Sir John Pakington, 2nd Baronet.

== Family ==
Sir John married Frances, daughter of Sir John Ferrers of Tamworth, with whom he had two children, a son John (1620–1680), who succeeded to the title, and one daughter (Elizabeth), who married, first, Colonel Henry Washington, and, secondly, Samuel Sandys of Ombersley in Worcestershire.

His widow, Frances, married at St. Antholin, Budge Row, London, on 29 December 1626, "Mr. Robert Leasly, gent." The similarity of name may account for the incorrect statement sometimes made that she became the second wife of Alexander Leslie, 1st Earl of Leven. However, the bridegroom in question was in fact Robert Leslie, son of Patrick Leslie, 1st Lord Lindores.

== Notes ==
Parliament of England
Preceded by John Dormer; Henry Borlase	Member of Parliament for Aylesbury; 1624; With: Sir Thomas Crewe	Succeeded by Sir Robert Kerr; Sir Thomas Crewe
Political offices
Preceded by Sir John Pakington	Custos Rotulorum of Worcestershire; 1623–1624	Succeeded by Sir Thomas Coventry
Baronetage of England
New creation	Baronet (of Ailesbury); 1620–1624	Succeeded by John Pakington
