= John Pakington (MP and Sheriff) =

Sir John Pakington
- Born: c.1477
- Died: 21 August 1551; Hampton Lovett, Worcestershire
- Occupations: MP and Sheriff of Herefordshire and Worcestershire
- Spouse: Anne Dacres
- Children: Bridget Pakington; Ursula Pakington
- Parent(s): John Pakington, Elizabeth Washborne

Sir John Pakington (c.1477 – 21 August 1551), was Chirographer of the Court of Common Pleas, a Member of Parliament for Gloucester, and Sheriff of Herefordshire and Worcestershire. In 1529 he received an extraordinary grant from Henry VIII permitting him to wear his hat in the King's presence.

== Biography ==
Although the Pakington family is of great antiquity, being recorded at the time of the foundation of St Mary's Abbey, Kenilworth, in the reign of Henry I, according to Burke the 'founder of the fortunes of the house of Pakington' was the lawyer Sir John Pakington in the reign of Henry VIII.

Born about 1477, he was the eldest son of John Pakington of Stanford-on-Teme, Worcestershire, and Elizabeth Washbourne, the daughter and heiress of Thomas Washbourne. He had three brothers, Humphrey, Robert and Augustine, and three sisters: Joyce married firstly a husband surnamed Blount, and secondly John Corbet of Leigh, Shropshire; Eleanor married a husband surnamed Gravener, of Shropshire; and Margery married a husband surnamed Neve.

Pakington began his legal career in about 1498 as an attorney in the Court of Common Pleas. He entered the Inner Temple shortly before 1505, and in 1507 was acting as counsel in the Court of Requests. He may have secured patronage at court, which could account for his appointment in 1508 as Chirographer of the Court of Common Pleas, (Note: Chirographer: "The officer appointed to 'engross fines' (chirographs), in the Court of Common Pleas" ("chirographer, n.", Oxford English Dictionary (online ed.), Oxford University Press, March 2013, (subscription, Wikipedia Library access or UK public library membership required)).) an office in the gift of the Crown. In 1512 he was appointed solicitor for the Mercers' Company. In the following year he was a justice of the peace in Gloucestershire, and in 1515 was elected to represent Gloucester in Parliament. He became a Bencher of the Inner Temple in 1517, was Lent Reader in 1520 and again in 1528.

Pakington's place at the Common Pleas was re-granted to himself and his brother Austin (or Augustine) on 12 October 1525. On 5 April 1529 he had an extraordinary grant by letters patent from Henry VIII permitting him:

to wear his hat in [the King's] presence, and his successors, or of any other persons whatsoever, and not to be uncovered on any occasion or cause whatsoever against his will and good liking; also that he shall not be appointed, called or compelled to take the order of knighthood, or degree, state or order of a Baron of the Exchequer, Serjeant-at-law, or any office or encumbrance thereto relating.

In 1531 he was offered the position of serjeant-at-law, and declined it.

Pakington's name appears many times in the records of the Inner Temple, and at a Parliament on 5 February 1534, in recognition of his contributions, the new Inner Temple chambers which had been built between the library and Barrington's Rents were named Pakington's Rents.

In 1532 he was made a justice of North Wales, and was recorder of Worcester by 1539, and a judge on the Brecon circuit in Wales in 1541.

In 1535 he was appointed a commissioner to compound for all forfeitures, fines and other sums due to Henry VIII or his father, Henry VII. In 1538 he served as Sheriff of Herefordshire, and in 1540 as Sheriff of Worcestershire. In 1539 he was Knight of the Shire (MP) for Worcestershire, and on 31 August 1540 made Custos Rotulorum for Worcestershire. On 29 September 1540 he was commissioner to inquire what jewels had been embezzled from the shrine of St. David's. For the rest of his life he worked in Wales, but lived chiefly at Hampton Lovett in Worcestershire.

Henry VIII enriched Pakington with many grants, and knighted him in 1545. He was from time to time in the commission of the peace for various counties. Under Edward VI he was nominated a member of the council for the Welsh Marches in 1551.

Pakington is said to have owned thirty-one manors at the time of his death. Henry VIII had given him Westwood, Worcestershire, and other estates, and he had trafficked in abbey lands to some extent, but the account must have been exaggerated. In the subsidy roll, in which the valuations were always unduly low, he was rated at no more than £50 a year.

Pakington made his last will on 16 August 1551, and died five days later. He was buried at Hampton Lovett in the chapel of St Anne in the parish church. As he had no male issue, he was succeeded by Sir Thomas Pakington (died 2 June 1571), the eldest son of his brother, Robert Pakington (died 1536).

== Family ==
Pakington married, by 1530, Anne (d. 22 August 1563), the daughter of Henry Dacres of Mayfield, Staffordshire, Alderman of London in 1526 and Sheriff in 1528, a descendant of 'the ancient family of the Dacres in Westmorland', by his first wife, Elizabeth (d. 26 April 1530). She had a brother, Robert Dacres (d. 20 November 1543), Privy Councillor and Master of Requests to Henry VIII, who married Elizabeth Monoux (widow of Sir Thomas Denny (d.1527), elder brother of Sir Anthony Denny, and daughter of Sir George Monoux (died 1544), Lord Mayor of London), and two sisters, Eleanor Dacres, who married George Rolle (died 1552); and Alice Dacres, who married Robert Cheeseman (d. 24 July 1547).

At the time of the marriage, Anne was the widow of Robert Fairthwaite (d.1521), citizen and Merchant Taylor of London, by whom she had a daughter, Elizabeth Fairthwaite, who married Nicholas Tichborne of Roydon, Essex, as well as two sons, Martin Fairthwaite and Geoffrey Fairthwaite, who died without issue.

By his wife Anne, Pakington is said to have had two daughters, Ursula (d.1558), who married William Scudamore (d.1560), by whom she was the mother of Sir John Scudamore (1542–1623), and Bridget, who married Sir John Littleton of Frankley, Worcestershire, and after his death three other husbands.

There is a memorial to Pakington's widow, Anne, in the church of St Botolph, Aldersgate which depicts Anne, a knight in armour, and a daughter. The inscription reads:

Here under this tombe lyeth ye bodye of Dame Anne Packington, Widdow, late wife Sr John Packington, Kt: late Chirographer in the court of ye comon Please wch. Dame Anne deceassed the 22nd. day of August in the yeare of our Lord God 1563.
