= John Rushout =

John Rushout may refer to:

- Sir John Rushout, 4th Baronet (1685–1775), British politician
- John Rushout, 1st Baron Northwick (1738–1800), British politician, MP for Evesham
- John Rushout, 2nd Baron Northwick (1770–1859), English peer, landowner and collector of art works
