= Dearie (disambiguation) =

"Dearie" is a popular song.

Dearie may also refer to:

- Dearie (surname), an American surname
- Dearie Mulvey (20th century), American baseball executive
- Dearie (film), a 1927 silent film starring Irene Rich

== See also ==
- Deary (disambiguation)
