= Rushout =

Rushout is a surname. Notable people with the surname include:

- Anne Rushout (c. 1767–1849), English watercolorist and diarist
- John Rushout (disambiguation), multiple people
- Sir James Rushout, 1st Baronet (1644–1698), English landowner and politician
- Rushout baronets
- George Rushout, 3rd Baron Northwick (1811–1887), British politician
