= Peter Matthias Van Gelder =

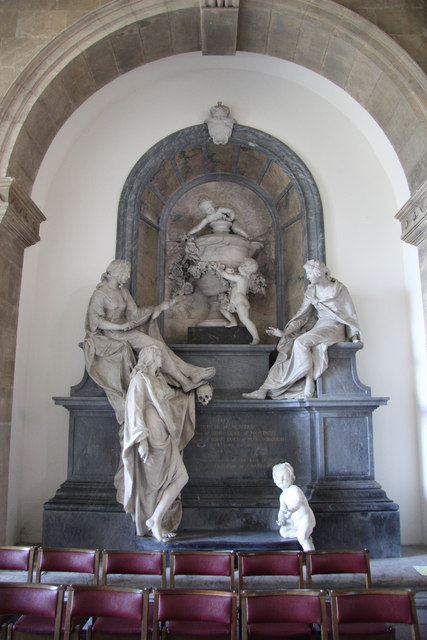
Monument to Mary, Duchess of Montagu in Warkton Parish Church

Peter Matthias Van Gelder or Vangelder (1739–1809) was an 18th-century British sculptor, architect and builder of Dutch descent.

== Life ==
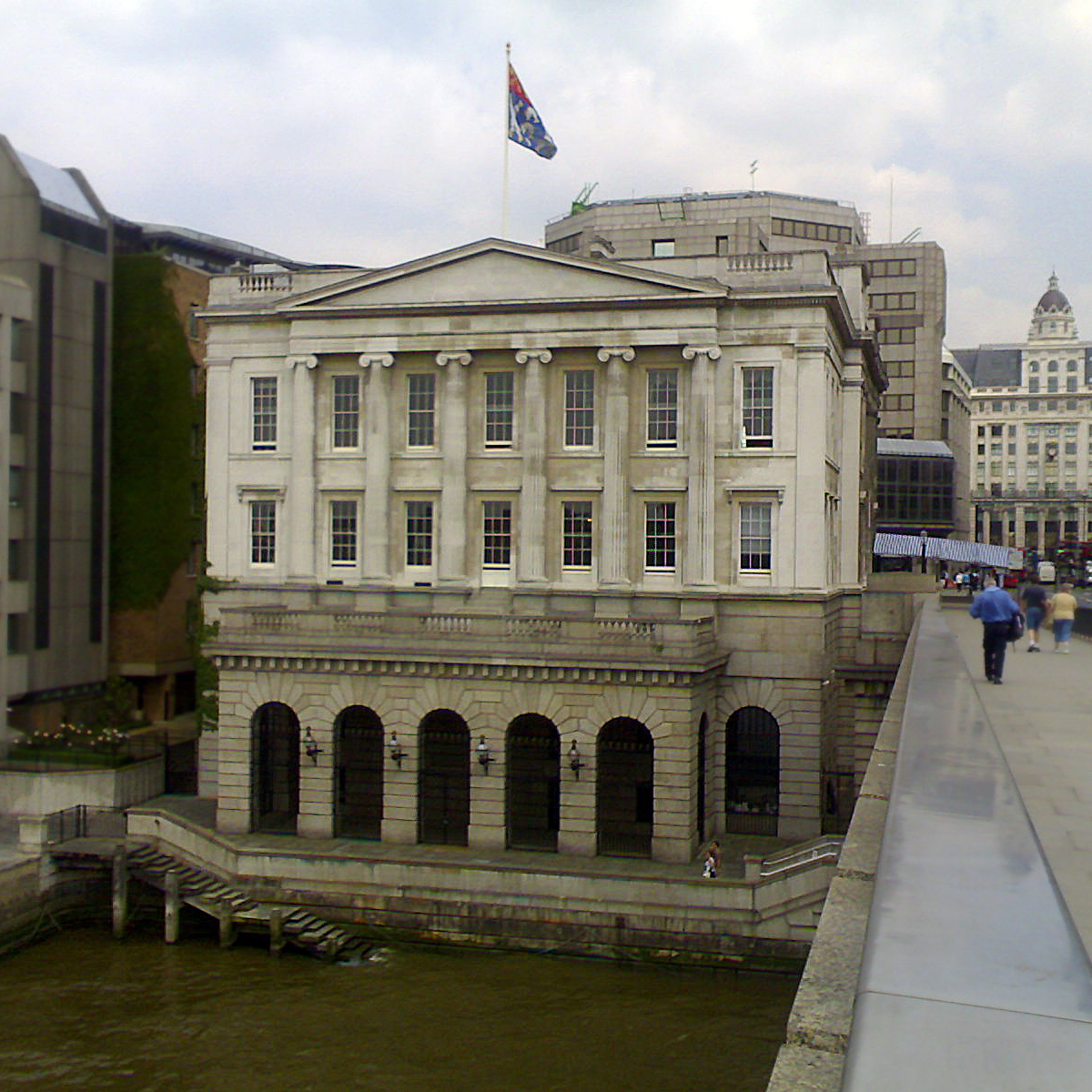
Vangelders frontage at Fishmongers' Hall

He was born in Amsterdam in Holland in 1739 and came to England in the 1750s. He moved to London and joined the premises of Thomas Carter the Elder as an apprentice stonemason and sculptor. Other contemporary apprentices in the yard included John Deare. He was paid two guineas a week in this period.

Not until 1769 did he attend the Royal Academy Schools but quickly impressed, gaining a Silver Medal from the Royal Academy in his first year and the Gold Medal for 1771 for his bas-relief "The Choice of Hercules".

By 1780 his company had expanded into a high quality building company and had started to undertake prestigious projects in London.

He died on 3 September 1809 at his home at Upper Norton Street in London. His will was settled on 19 December 1809 and is held at the National Archives in Kew.

== Family ==
His widow died in 1814.

== Works ==
- Memorial to Mary, Duchess of Montagu at Warkton (1771) commissioned by Robert Adam his finest work
- Chimneypiece for the Drapers' Hall in London (1778)
- Monument to Rev John Fulham at Compton, Surrey (1781)
- Terrace of houses on north side of Bedford Square in London (1781)
- Monument styled as a pyramid to Robert Child at Heston (1782)
- Houses in Riding House Lane (1786)
- Monument to Henry Read at Ramsbury (1786)
- Monument to Mrs Newland at Havant (1786)
- Ornamentation at Fishmongers Hall for the Worshipful Company of Fishmongers (1789-1792) - frontage and interior
- Two chimneypieces for Northwick Park for Sir John Rushout (c.1790)
- Terrace of houses at Devonshire Place in London (1793)
- Plaque in library at Audley End in Essex (1794)
- Monument to Margaret Emma Stephens Lady Orde at Hanwell (1796)
- Monument to Henry Southby at Buckland, Berkshire (1796)
- Monument to Alexander Hume at Wormley, Hertfordshire (1800)
- Chimneypieces for Grocers Hall for the Worshipful Company of Grocers (1800)
- Monument to John Rushout, 1st Baron Northwick at Blockley (1800)
- Monument to Frances Read at Ramsbury (1801)
- Monument to John Fleming at North Stoneham (1802)
- Monument to Robert Davies at Wrexham (1802)
- Monument to Richard Puleston at Wrexham (1804)
- Monument to Newton Barton at Broadwater, Sussex (1808)
- Chimneypieces for Mr Coutts for his house on Stratton Street in Piccadilly (1809)
- Memorial to Mrs Frampton in Moreton, Dorset (dnk)
- Monument to Major John Andre in Westminster Abbey (dnk)

== Restoration ==
The Montagu monuments in Warkton were restored in 2014.

=== Gallery ===
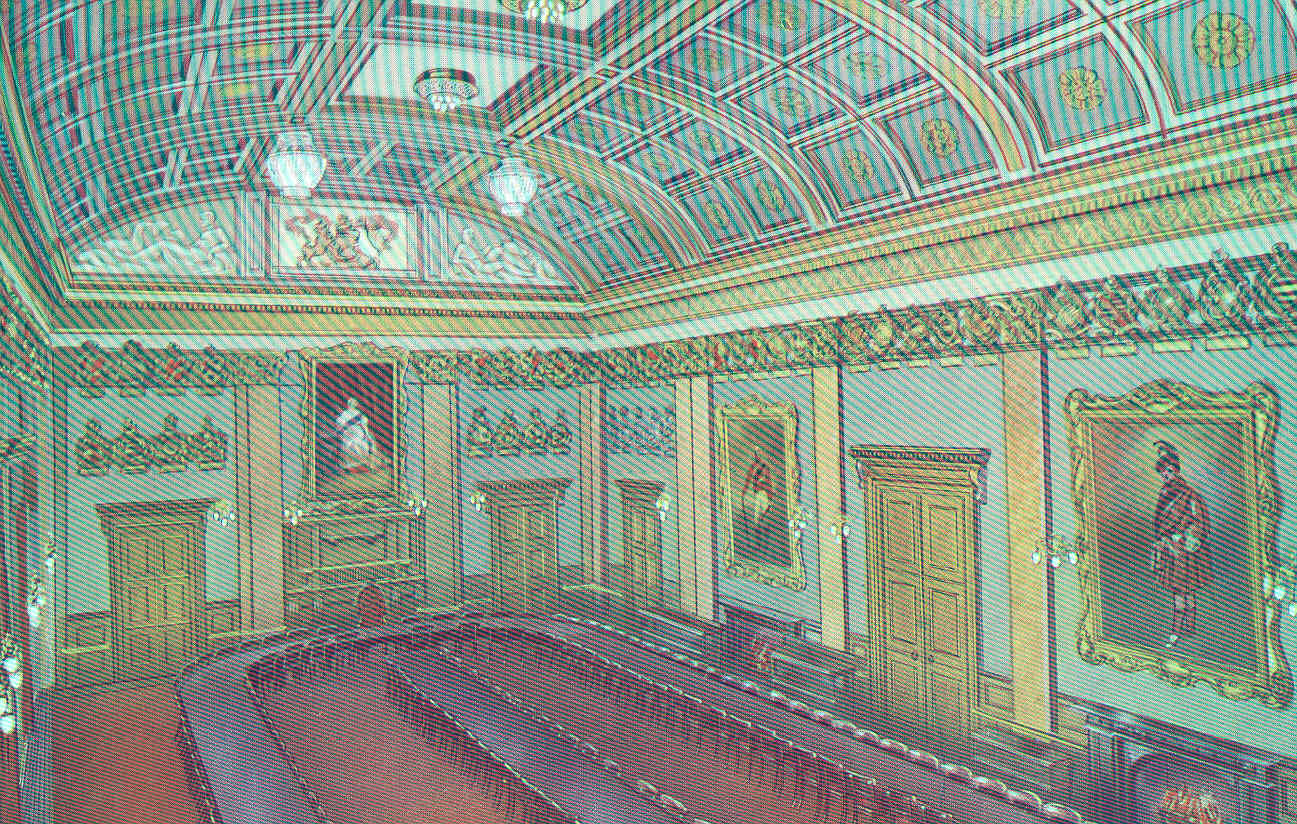
Vangelders interior at Fishmongers Hall

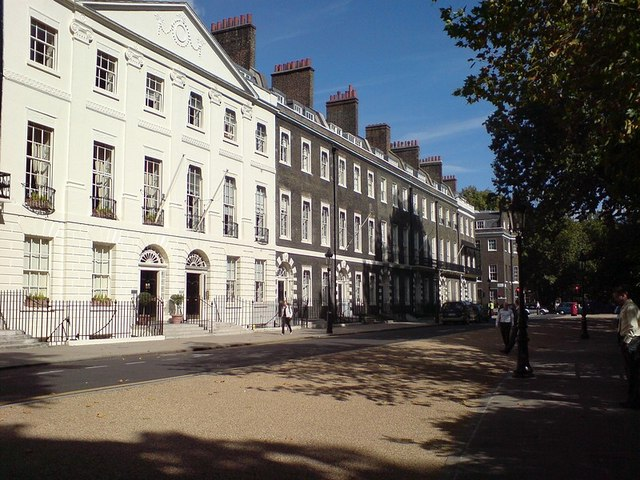
North Side of Bedford Square by Peter Van Gelder
