= Deare =

Deare is a surname. Notable people with the surname include:

- Aloyce Beth DuVal Deare (died 2011), known professionally as Beth Deare, American film producer and educator
- C. R. Deare (1852–1921), South African cricket umpire
- John Deare (1759–1798), English sculptor
- Morgan Deare (born 1945), American actor

== See also ==
- Dare (name)
- Deer (disambiguation)
- Deere (disambiguation)
- Dearie (surname)
