= Thomas Carter (sculptor) =

British artist (1702–1756)

Thomas Carter (1702–1756) was an 18th-century British sculptor. His nephew, also Thomas Carter (died 1795), was a sculptor who worked with him, and it is hard to separate some sections of their work. They specialised in ornate marble fireplaces for English country mansions.

== Life ==
His was born in London in 1702. He had a stone yard in Shepherd Market in London. He mainly made chimneypieces but also did some statuary. Around 1729 he received a loan of £100 from Charles Jervas who had met him through a business connection. This permitted him to get an assistant and buy some better quality marbles. Through this action he employed Roubiliac, but the latter quickly found his own clients and left the business. Carter later moved to premises in the Parish of St George's near Hanover Square, Westminster.

Apprentices in his yard included John Deare and Peter Matthias Van Gelder.

He died in 1795 and John Cheere was executor of his will.

He was married to Mary and had two daughters: Elizabeth and Ann. The latter was wife of Thomas Carter the Younger (her first cousin).

== Works ==
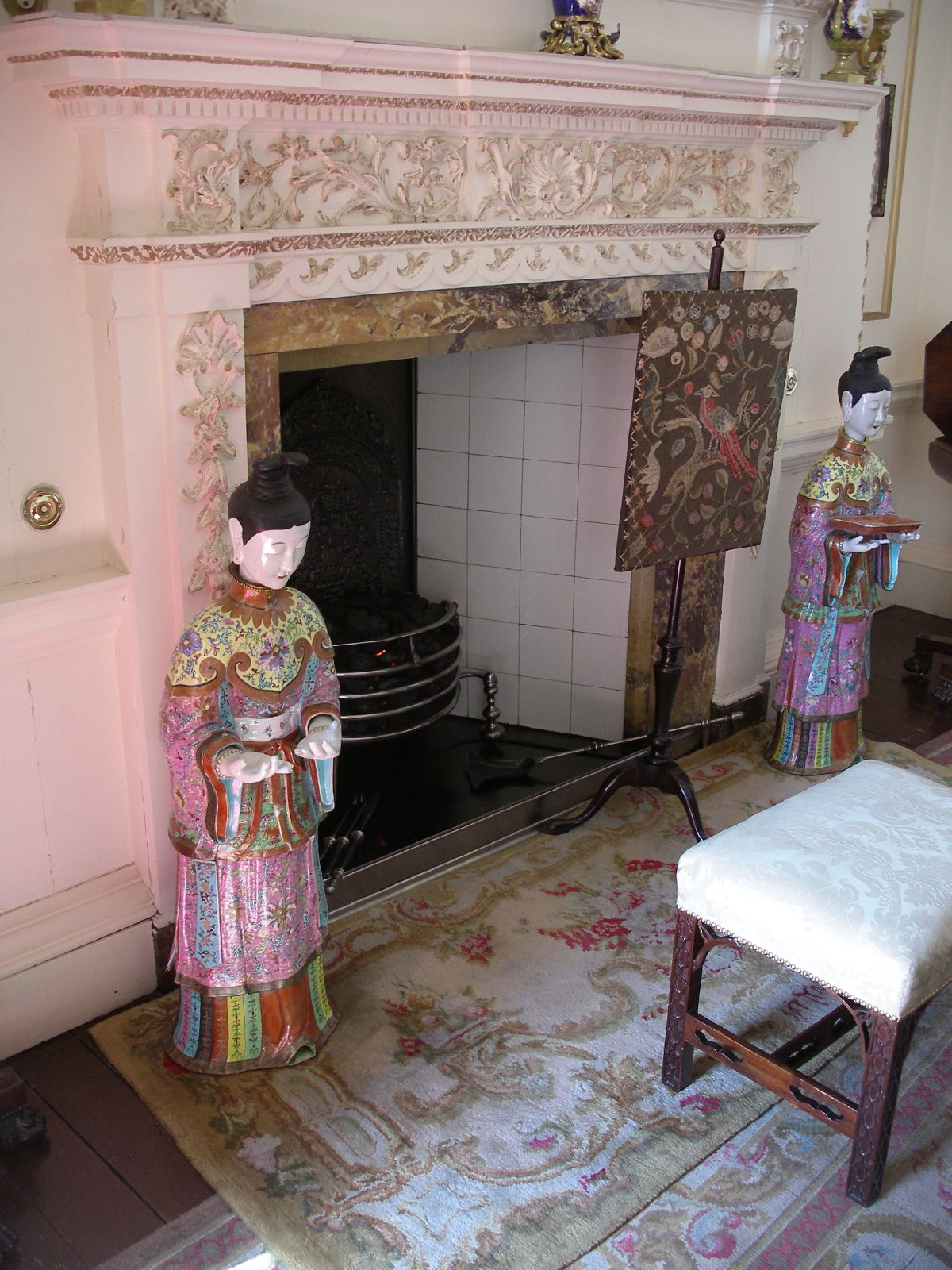
Chimneypiece at Blair Castle by Thomas Carter the Elder

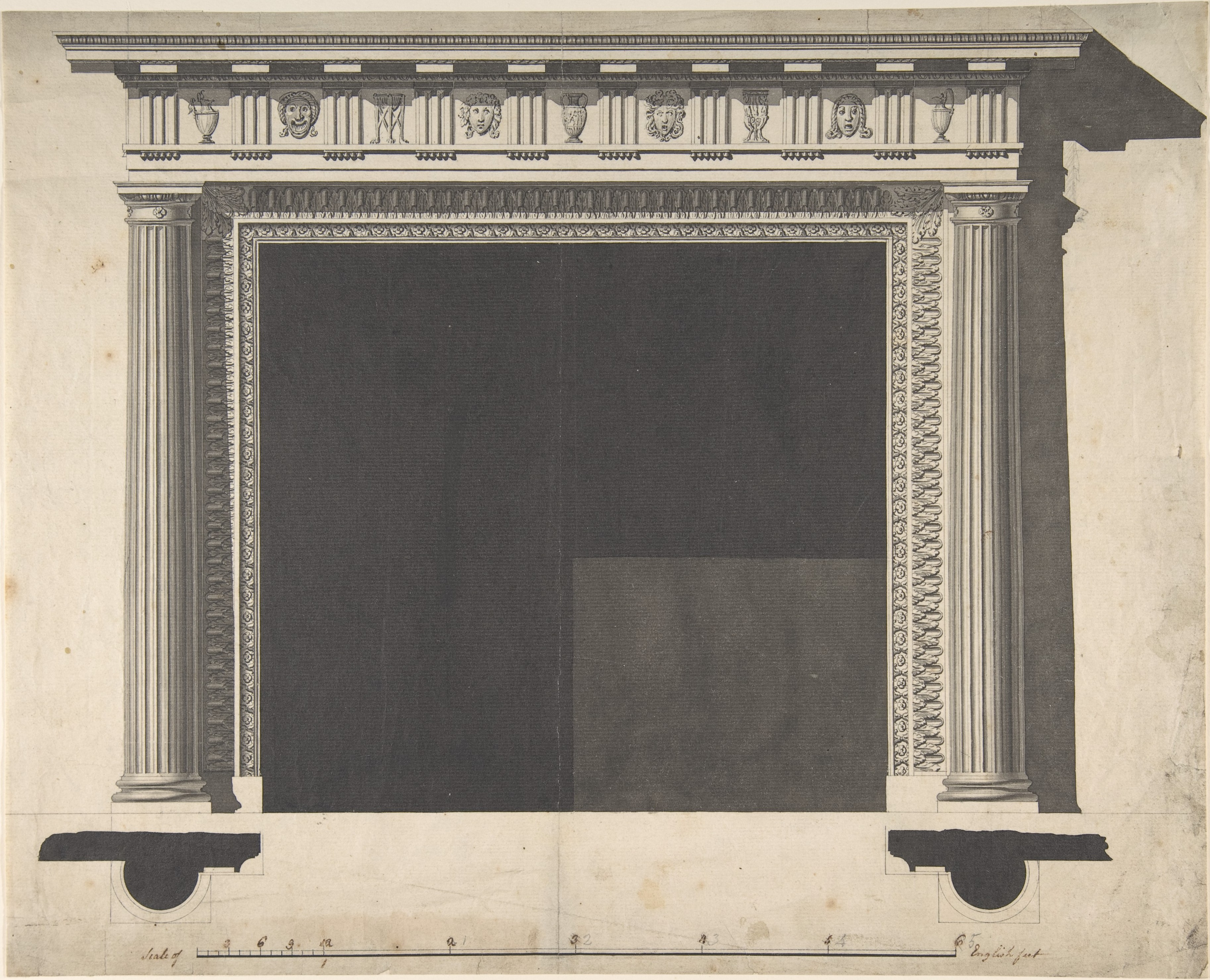
Chimney-piece, for the Saloon, Milton Park, designed by Sir William Chambers carved by Thomas Carter

- Tomb of Sir Henry Every at Newton Solney (c.1712)
- Mausoleum to Speaker Conolly (1730) in Celbridge in Ireland (contains two recumbent figures inside)
- Tomb of Mary Carew at Antony, Cornwall (1731)
- Tomb of Lord and Lady Cecil Wray at Branston, Lincolnshire (1736)
- Tomb of Col Thomas Moore at Great Bookham (1740)
- Chimneypieces for Rousham Park (1737) for General Dormer-Cottrell
- Chimneypieces for Longford Castle (1739)
- Chimneypieces at Holkham Hall in Norfolk (1740)
- Chimneypieces for the house of Mr James West at Lincoln's Inn Fields (1745)
- Memorial to Carew Hervy Mildmay in Sherborne Abbey (1746)
- Chimneypieces for Welbeck Abbey (1746)
- Chimneypieces for Moulsham Park in Essex (1746)
- Chimneypieces at Oakover Hall (1747)
- Multiple chimneypieces at Uppark in Sussex for Sir Matthew Fetherstonhaugh
- Chimneypieces for Milton Hall (1750) executing the designs of Sir William Chambers
- Multiple chimneypieces for Blair Castle (1748-1756)
- Chimneypieces at Belhus, Essex (1752)
- Two figures for Blair Castle
- Chimneypieces for Charles Townsend, Lord Townsend's London house (1756)

== Thomas Carter the Younger ==
Nephew and son-in-law of Thomas Younger the Elder, he was probably apprenticed to him. On the Elder'd death in 1756 he bequeathed his stock to Benjamin Carter, his brother, who also specialised in chimneypieces. But Thomas the Younger appears to have gone into business with Benjamin and together they opened a new yard at Piccadilly. They had a considerable workforce and persons who worked there included John Eckstein. They continued to specialise in chimneypieces.

Carter the Younger appears to have been the craftsman who worked with Robert Adam creating the world-famous Adam fireplaces. His commissions were largely from the British aristocracy and rose as high as working for the Prince Regent.

He died in Knightsbridge on 5 January 1795.

== Works ==
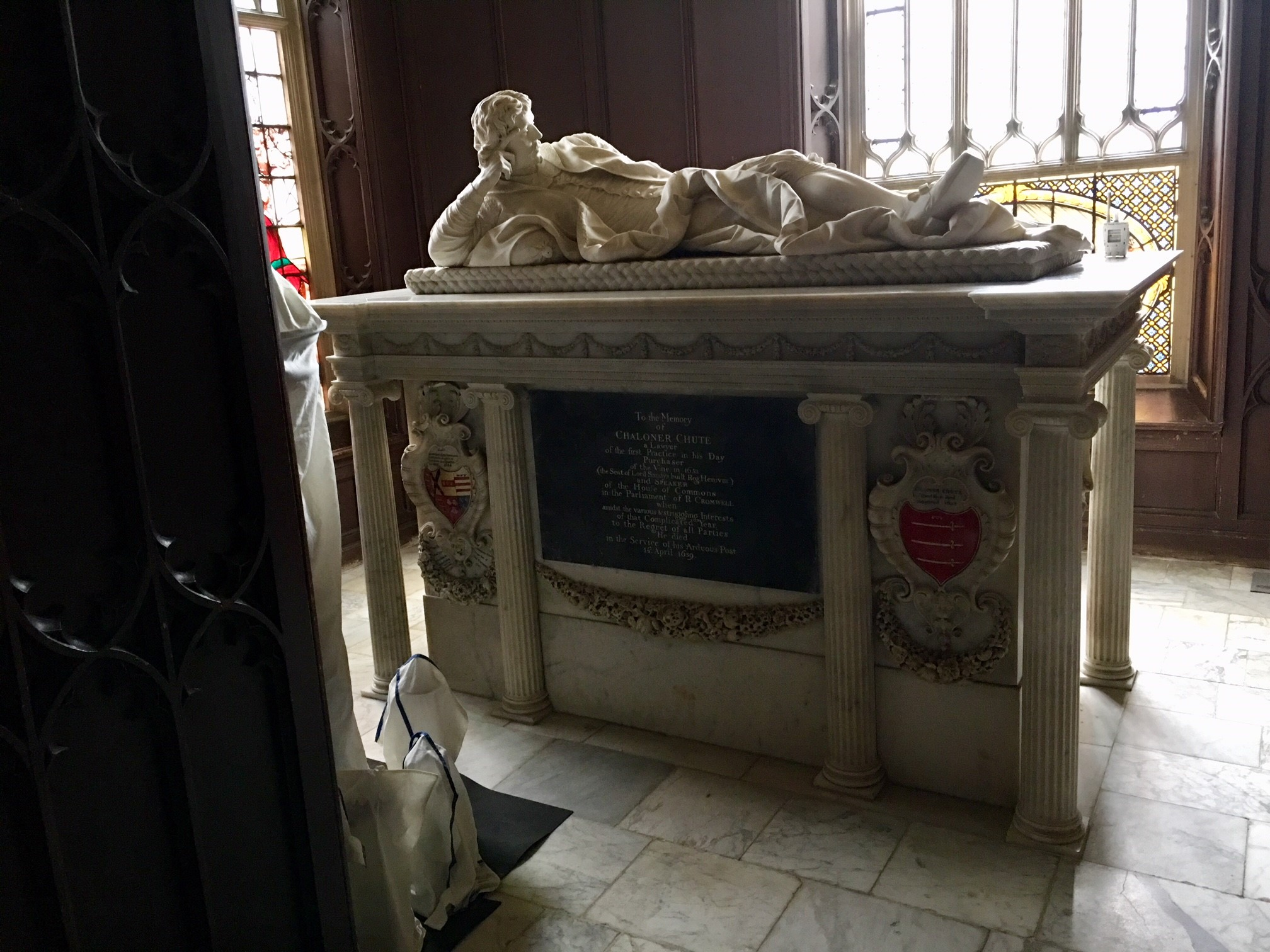
Monument to Chaloner Chute in the chapel of The Vyne

- Chimneypieces for Saltram House (1760)
- Chimneypieces for Shardeloes (1761)
- "Marbles" for the Gallery at Strawberry Hill House (1763) for Horace Walpole
- Chimneypieces at Bowood House to the designs of both Robert Adam and James Stuart (1763 to 1774)
- Chimneypieces for the house of Sir Richard Lyttleton's house in Piccadilly (1764)
- Chimneypieces for Croome Court (1765)
- Chimneypieces for Mersham Hall in Kent (1766 to 1768) for Sir Edward Knatchbull, 7th Baronet
- Chimneypieces for Lansdowne House at Berkeley Square (1768) to the designs of Robert Adam
- Multiple chimneypieces for Milton Abbey (1774 to 1776)
- Memorial to Chaloner Chute at The Vyne in Hampshire (1775-1780) commissioned by Sir John Chute
- Chimneypieces for the Museum at Busbridge (1777) commissioned by Henry Holland and paid for by Sir Thomas Marker
- Chimneypieces for General Richard Smith MP of Chilton Lodge in Hungerford (1777)
- Chimneypieces for the house of Nicholas Henny in St James Street, London (1777)
- Chimneypieces for Lord Delavel on Hanover Square, London (1782) to the designs of Sir John Soane
- Royal Commission for chimneypieces at Carlton House (1785) for the Prince Regent
- Ornamentation in dining-room of Holkham Hall (1777)
- Chimneypieces for the offices of Ransome, Morland and Hammersley of Pall Mall (1791) to the designs of Sir John Soane
- Chimneypieces for Woburn Abbey (1791) for the Duke of Bedford

== Survival ==
Most of the Carters' work still survive in-situ. Some examples of their work such as the "Aesop's Fables" Fireplace of 1755, have sold for sums over £60,000.
