= Midland Motor Company =

Defunct American motor vehicle manufacturer

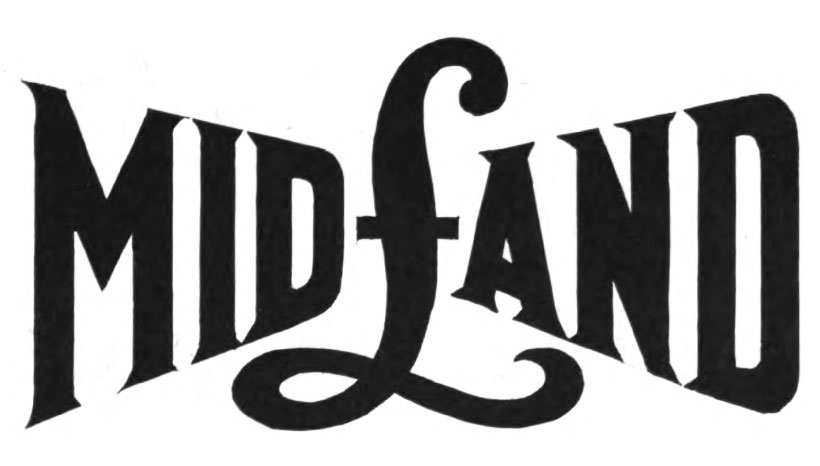
- Unusual Cars at Common Prices
- Industry: Automobile manufacturer
- Predecessor: Deere-Clarke Motor Car Co.
- Founded: 1908; 118 years ago
- Founder: Charles H. Pope, President
- Defunct: 1913; 113 years ago
- Fate: Bankrupt
- Headquarters: Moline, Illinois, United States
- Products: Automobiles
- Production output: 2,954 (1909-1913)

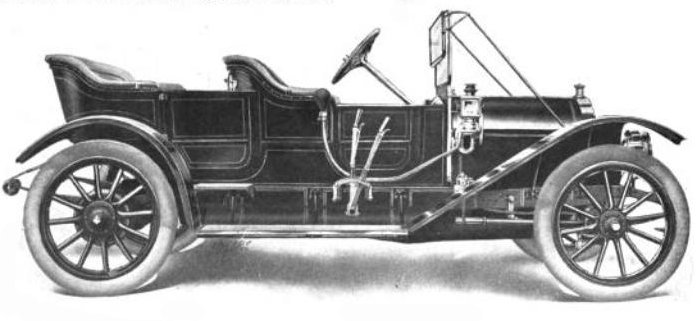
1911 Midland Model L2

Midland Motor Company was an American brass era automobile manufacturer in Moline, Illinois from 1908 to 1913.

== History ==
Midland Motor Company formed from the remnants of the Deere-Clark Motor Car Company after the John Deere company pulled out of the venture.

In 1910, Midland produced two models. The Model L was a touring car with a 318in^{3} (5213cc) (4 1/2×5-inch, 114×127 mm) four-cylinder engine of 40 hp (30 kW) built by Milwaukee. It had a wheelbase of 115 in (2921 mm), 34×4-inch (86×10-cm) spoke wheels, and the choice of partial tonneau or roadster with trunk. In 1911 this was mid-priced at $2,100 (equivalent to $72,562 in 2025).

The Model K was a touring car with a 390in^{3} (6389cc) (4 3/4×5 1/2-inch, 120×140 mm) four of 50 hp (37 kW). It had a wheelbase of 118 in (2997 mm), 36×4-inch (91×10-cm) spoke wheels, and the choice of touring or demi-tonneau bodies. In 1911 this was higher mid-priced at $2,250

Midland had progressive engineering, with an in-unit engine and transmission. The drive-line from the engine to the differential was enclosed. A six-cylinder car was introduced in 1912.

In 1911 Charles Pope retired and died the next year. The company entered bankruptcy in 1913 due to mismanagement.

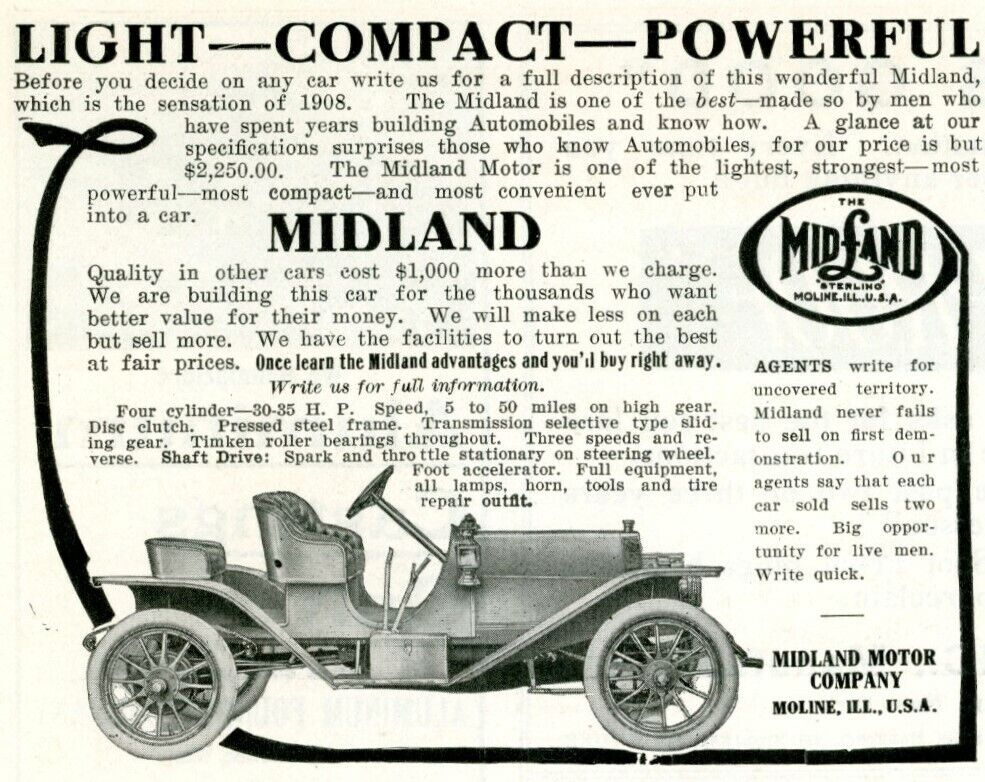
1908 Midland Advertisement in Cycle and Automobile Trade Journal

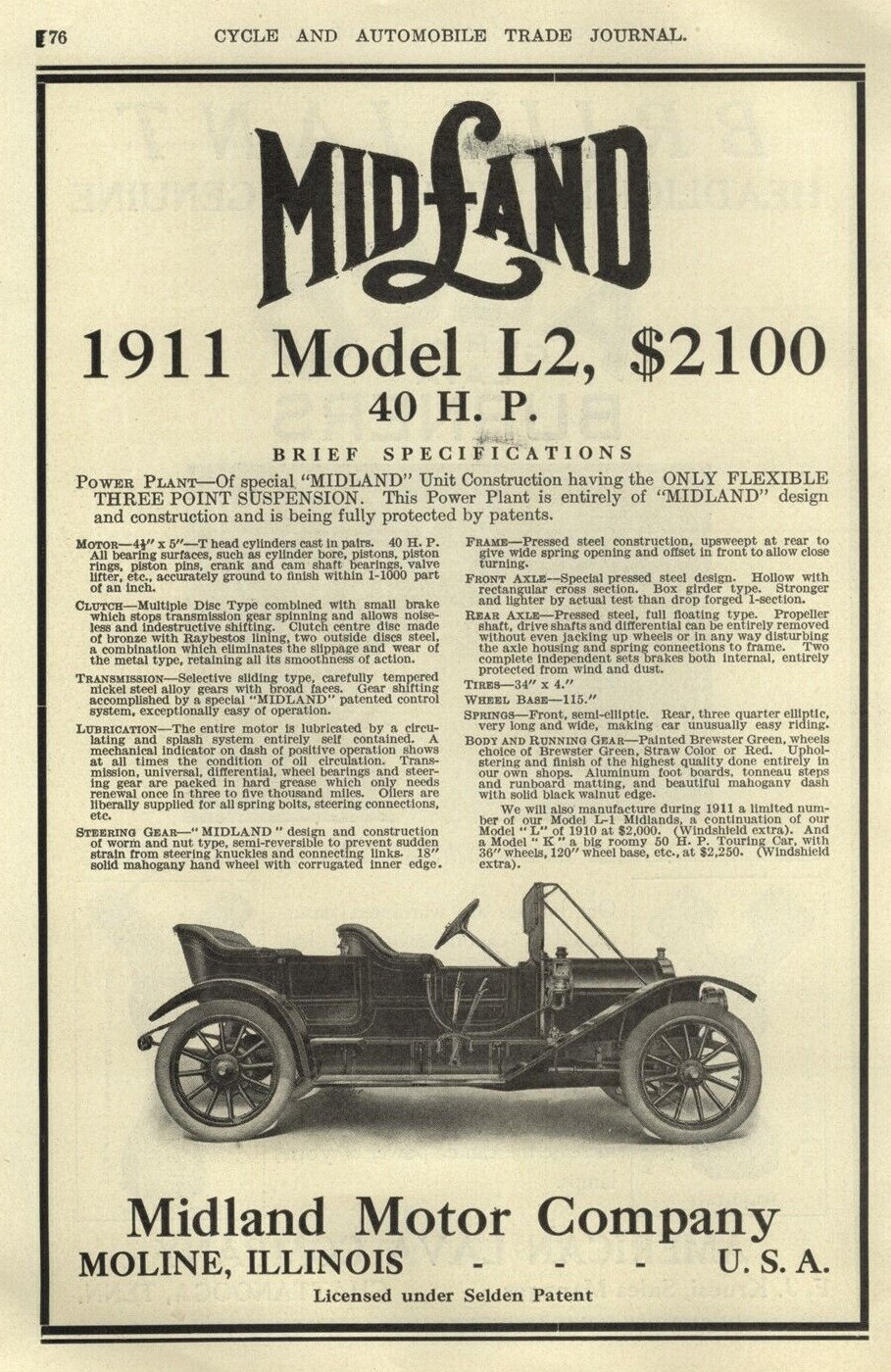
1911 Midland Advertisement in Cycle and Automobile Trade Journal

== See also ==
- List of defunct United States automobile manufacturers
- Velie and Moline, are other early automobile manufacturers from Moline, Illinois.
- 1911 Midland Model L-1 at Conceptcarz
