= Dearie (surname) =

Dearie is a surname. Notable people with the surname include:

- Blossom Dearie (1924–2009), American jazz singer and pianist
- John Dearie, American novelist
- John C. Dearie (born 1940), American lawyer and politician
- Raymond J. Dearie (born 1944), United States judge

== See also ==
- Deare
