= John Rushout, 1st Baron Northwick =

British politician (1738–1800)

John Rushout, 1st Baron Northwick (23 July 1738 – 20 October 1800) was a British politician and Member of Parliament (MP) for Evesham.

Rushout was the son of Sir John Rushout, 4th Baronet and Lady Anne Compton, and was educated at Eton and Christ Church, Oxford, which he entered in 1756. In 1761 he was elected as Member of Parliament (MP) for Evesham and held the seat until 1796. Politically, he was Whig until about 1789 when he went over to William Pitt the Younger and hence sat as a Tory.

He succeeded to the Rushout Baronetcy of Milnst, Essex, in 1775 and became 1st Baron Northwick of Northwick Park in the county of Worcester in 1797. He became a Fellow of the Society of Antiquaries (F.S.A.) in 1799.

== Marriage and issue ==
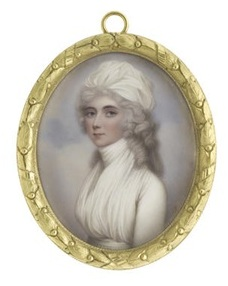
Rebecca Bowles, portrait miniature by Henry Bone, 1810

He married Rebecca Bowles (b.1740) on 3 June 1766 at Wanstead, Essex.

They had five children:

- Hon. Harriet Rushout (d.30 Oct 1851) m. Sir Charles Cockerell
- Hon. Anne Rushout (d.4 Apr 1849)
- John Rushout, 2nd Baron Northwick (b.16 Feb 1770, d. 20 Jan 1859)
- Reverend Hon. George Rushout-Bowles (b.30 Jul 1772, d.Oct 1842) m. Lady Caroline Stewart, daughter of John Stewart, 7th Earl of Galloway. Their son George became the 3rd Baron Northwick.
- Hon. Elizabeth Rushout (b.1774, d.15 Jan 1862).

He died in 1800 aged sixty-two and was buried at Blockley, Worcestershire. His tomb was designed and built by Peter Matthias Van Gelder.

Lady Northwick died on 3 October 1818 at Northwick Park.

Coat of arms of John Rushout, 1st Baron Northwick
Crest A Lion passant guardant Or Escutcheon Sable two Lions passant guardant within a Bordure engrailed Or Supporters On either side an Angel proper winged and crined Or habited Argent semy of Fleur-de-lis and Mullets Gold around the waist a Sash Azure and holding in the exterior hands Palm Branches Vert Motto Par Ternis Suppar

Parliament of Great Britain
Preceded by Edward Rudge; Sir John Rushout	Member of Parliament for Evesham; 1761–1796; With: Sir John Rushout to 1768; George Durant 1768–1774; Henry Seymour 1774–1780; Charles Boughton 1780–1790; Thomas Thompson from 1790	Succeeded by Charles Thellusson; Thomas Thompson
Baronetage of England
Preceded by John Rushout	Baronet (of Milnst); 1775–1800	Succeeded by John Rushout
Peerage of Great Britain
New creation	Baron Northwick; 1797–1800	Succeeded by John Rushout
