= John Rushout, 2nd Baron Northwick =

English peer, landowner and collector of art works

The Right Honourable The Lord Northwick FSA
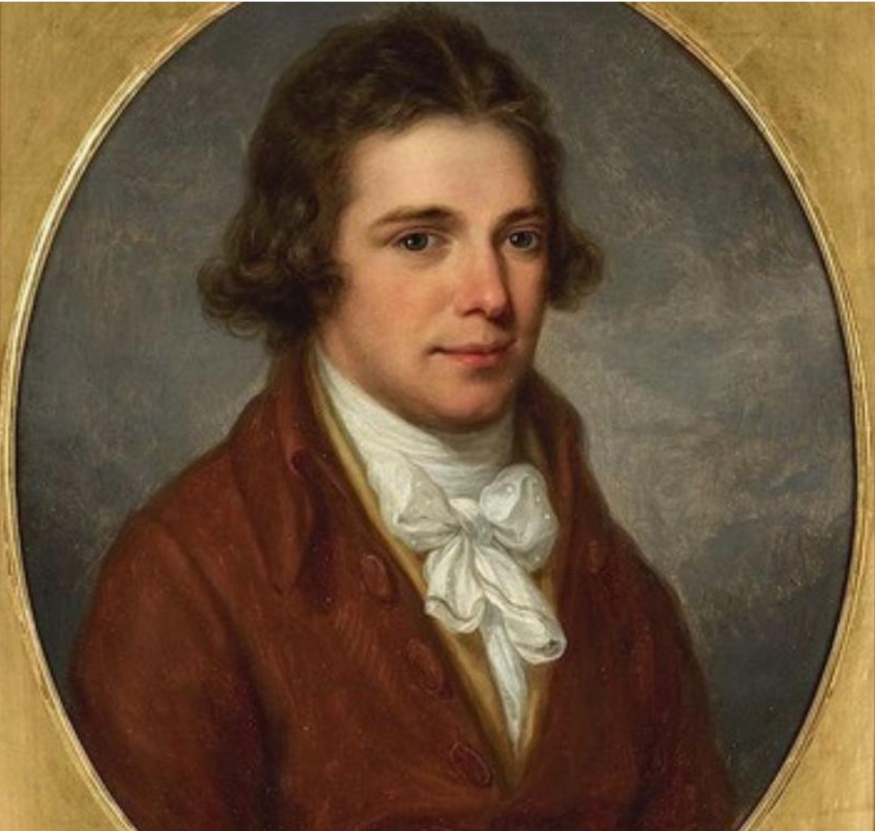
- portrait by Angelika Kauffmann
- Born: 16 February 1770
- Died: 20 January 1859 (aged 88)
- Occupation: Art collector, politician
- Parent(s): John Rushout, 1st Baron Northwick; Rebecca Rushout, Lady Northwick

John Rushout, 2nd Baron Northwick, FSA (16 February 1770 – 20 January 1859) was an English peer, landowner and collector of art works.

Rushout was the son of John Rushout, 1st Baron Northwick and his wife Rebecca Bowles. He was born at St James', Westminster, London and was educated at Newcome's School at Hackney (rather than Eton like his father) and did not then go to an English university. Instead he was sent to Neuchâtel in Switzerland. In 1790 he visited Italy and while touring the continent became friends with many eminent men including Edward Gibbon, Horatio Nelson, Sir William Hamilton (diplomat) and his wife Emma Hamilton, Richard Payne Knight, and the Italian artists Antonio Canova, and Vincenzo Camuccini. While he was living at the Bay of Palermo HMS Vanguard was stranded there, and as a result he was the first man in Europe to receive the news of the victory of the Battle of the Nile, hearing it from Nelson himself. He was also party to a less glorious incident of Nelson's career, as he was at Nelson's table in the flagship when a gun announced the execution of Prince Francesco Caracciolo.

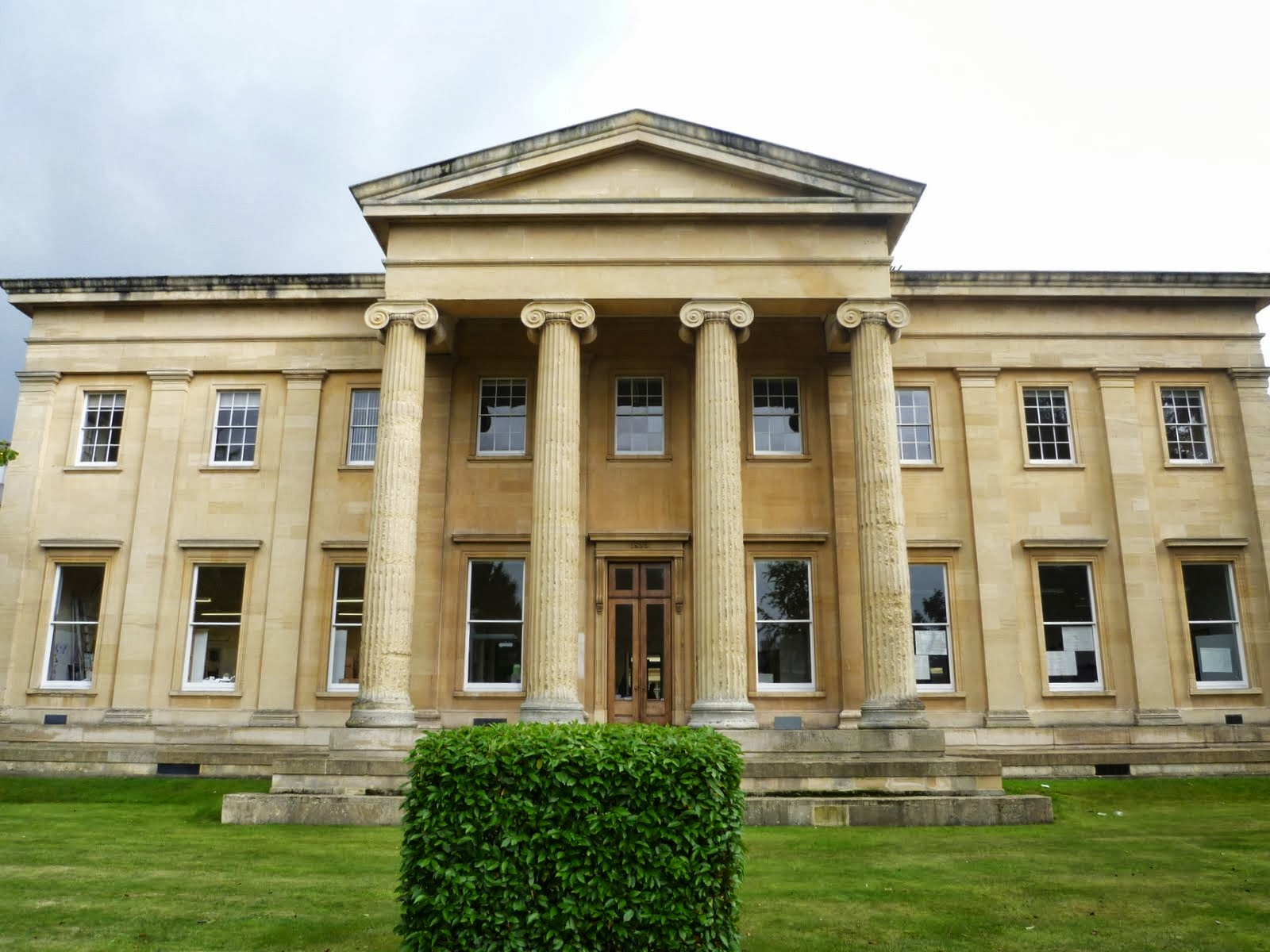
Thirlestaine House

Rushout developed a love of antique art from Sir William Hamilton and with Hamilton and Payne Knight purchased several collections of coins and other works of art. His art collection was to include paintings by contemporary artists as well as Old Masters, miniatures, enamels prints, coins and other collectible items. He returned from Italy in 1800 when, on the death of his father, he succeeded to the titles of 6th Baronet Rushout, of Milnst and 2nd Baron Northwick. He became a Fellow of the Society of Antiquaries (F.S.A.) in 1800. In 1832 he built a gallery for his collection at Northwick Park, near Moreton-in-Marsh, Gloucestershire, but this became too small. Northwick was a landowner behind many property developments in Cheltenham and purchased Thirlestaine House there to allow access to any art lovers who wanted to admire his collection. He also had a gallery at Connaught Place in London, which he sold in 1838, having transferred its pictures to Thirlestaine.

Northwick appears in the accounts of Anthony Trollope the author whose father had rented a poor farm from him at Harrow. As the farm failed, Trollope senior referred to Northwick as a 'cormorant who was eating us up' and fled to Belgium in 1834 to escape arrest for his debts.

Northwick died at Northwick Park in 1859 aged eighty-eight, intestate and childless. As a result, his collection was sold off and items from it appear in many major art collections around the world. The barony and Northwick Park passed to his nephew, George Rushout. Thirlestaine House was bought in 1863 by Sir Thomas Phillipps, Bt. to house his own huge book collection.

Parliament of Great Britain
| Preceded by John Rushout | Baron Northwick; 1800–1859 | Succeeded by George Rushout |
