= Deere (disambiguation) =

Deere is an English surname.

Deere may also refer to:

- Deere (automobile), American automobile manufacturer from 1906 to 1907
- Chamberlain John Deere, brand of tractors of Australia
- John Deere, brand name of Deere & Company
