= Thirlestaine House =

Grade I listed building in Cheltenham, Gloucestershire, England

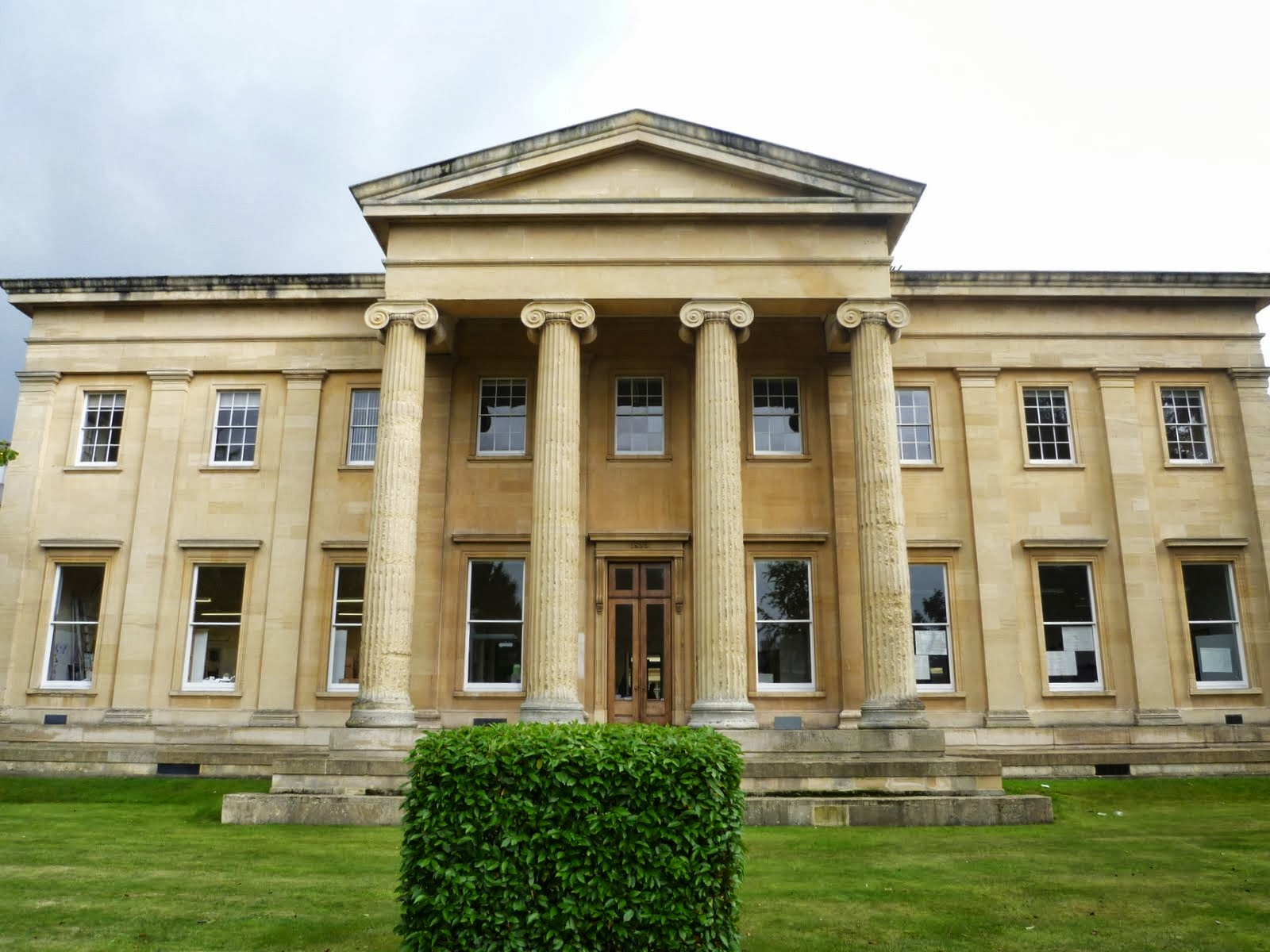
- View of Thirlestaine House from Bath Road
- Interactive map of the Thirlestaine House area

General information
- Architectural style: Neo-Greek
- Coordinates: 51.8906°N 2.0770°W
- Construction started: 1820
- Cost: £70,000-£80,000
- Owner: Cheltenham College

Thirlestaine House is a Grade I listed building in Cheltenham, Gloucestershire, England.

== History ==
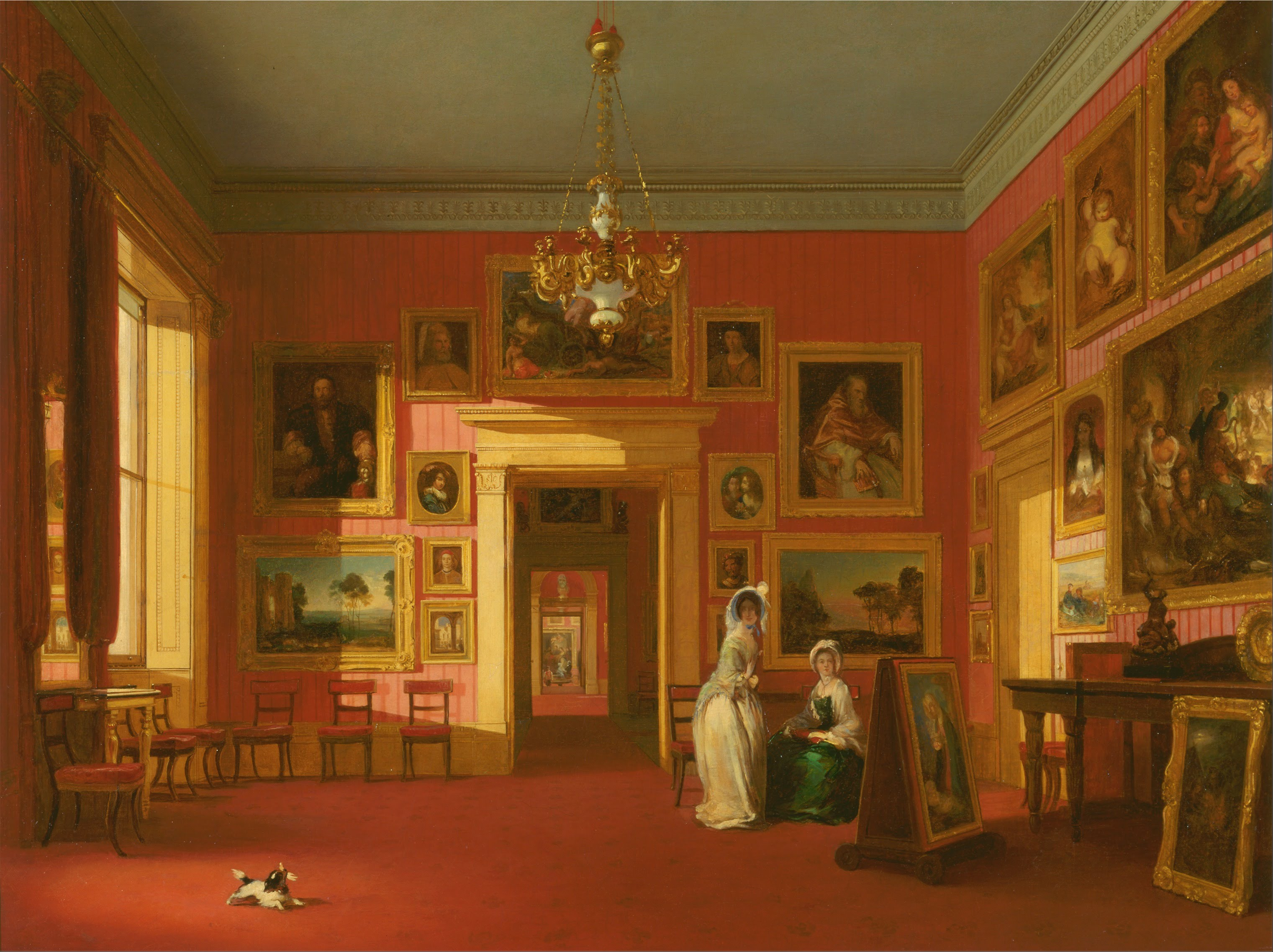
Lord Northwick's pictures illustrated in 1846-1847

Thirlestaine House was started in 1820 by J.R. Scott (an amateur architect) for his own use. In 1838 the unfinished building was bought by Lord Northwick and extended by the addition of an extra wing to house his art collection. His whole collection, including pictures still at Northwick, was sold on his death, intestate and childless, in 1859.

The house itself was bought by Sir Thomas Phillipps, Bt and used to house his huge book collection, which he transferred from his seat at Middlehill. The house was afterwards inherited by his family.

The building is currently owned by Cheltenham College who bought it in 1947 for £31,326.
