= John Eckstein =

German painter

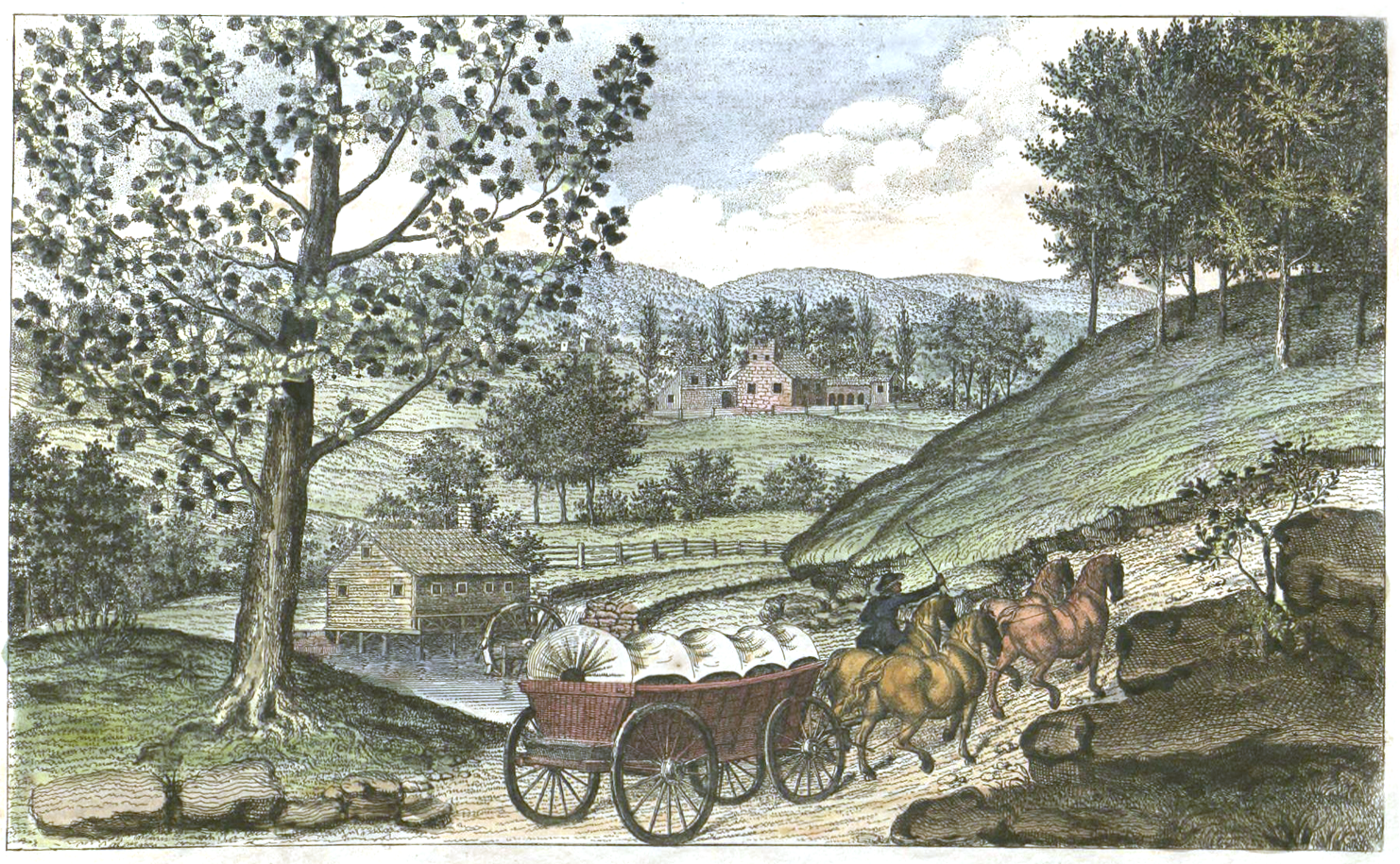
A rural scene with a wagon, from John Eckstein's American Drawing Magazine, 1805

Johann or John Eckstein (1735–1817), was a German-born sculptor, engraver and painter who worked briefly in London before establishing himself in his homeland and then in America. He is not to be confused with his son, also known as John, a painter who worked in England and the West Indies.

== Life ==
He was born at Poppenreuth near Nuremberg on 25 November 1735, the son of Conrad Eckstein, a woodcarver and cabinet-maker, and was the elder brother of George Paul Eckstein (1739–1828) who was also a sculptor in England. He studied under Preissler, at the Nuremberg Academy of Arts before moving to England.

== London ==
He was in London from 1758 to 1765.

Something is known of Eckstein's early career in London from the fact that he signed the relief on the monument to Roger Townshend in Westminster Abbey (erected 1761), made in the workshop of Benjamin and Thomas Carter at hanover Square in London. However, he did not design the relief himself, but worked from a terracotta model by Luc-François Breton. In April 1762 the Society of Arts awarded him a premium for a Portland stone relief, which he exhibited the next year at the Society of Artists. Another premium followed in 1764.

== Return to Germany ==
In 1765 Eckstein accepted an invitation from Frederick the Great to work at the Prussian court, where he became the king's principal sculptor, executing numerous works at Potsdam and Sans Souci. In 1769 another invitation took him to the court of the Grand Duke of Mecklenburg at Ludwigslust, who sent him a mission to England the next year. In London he met with an enthusiastic reception and exhibited wax portraits at the Royal Academy. After a year he returned to the Grand Ducal court, where he worked on the sculpture of the Hofkirche and made wax reliefs, including a surviving portrait of Friedrich Franz I. After four years at Ludwigslust he moved back to Berlin at the invitation of the king. In 1775–6 he modelled for the porcelain factory there, and exhibited at the academy. In 1786 he took the death mask of Frederick, from which he made the heads for wax busts. He continued to receive royal patronage from Frederick's successor, Frederick William, and may have carved metopes from models by Johann Gottfried Schadow for the Brandenburg Gate in Berlin in 1792.

== Philadelphia ==
In 1793 Eckstein wrote to George Washington from Potsdam, requesting money to pay for his passage to the United States, as he intended to settle in Philadelphia. It is not known if Washington responded, but Eckstein was in America by November of the same year, when he and his son Frederick advertised an exhibition of paintings, sculpture, and wax models at their house at 323 Market Street, Philadelphia. Eckstein became a founder member of the Philadelphia Academy and between 1810 and 1814 also showed work at the Society of Artists, where his exhibits included an equestrian figure of Washington, apparently intended for a monument to be erected in the city.

In 1805 he published the first part of The American Drawing Magazine, or, A Complete System of Drawing, described in a subtitle as "adapted to the use of all persons who would become accomplished in this branch of education, by which they may be instructed without the aid of a teacher, and also become acquainted with the first rudiments of painting, sculpture, and architecture". It is not known whether any of the other eleven planned parts was ever issued.

He did not find great success in the United States. According to an obituary "he had to lament that his professional labours did not meet with that encouragement in a new country, which is so liberally bestowed upon genius in Europe; and, like many of his brother artists, he had to struggle with adversity during many of the latter years of his life." Thomas Sully described him as "a thorough-going drudge in the arts. He could do you a picture in still life – history – landscape – portrait – he could model – cut a head in marble – anything you please". One of his last works was a marble bust of Emanuel Swedenborg commissioned by William Schlatter. In January 1817 Eckstein sailed for Havana, drawn by the prospect of being employed to finish a large monument that had been left incomplete. He died in Havana on 27 June 1817, aged 81.

== Family ==
Eckstein was the father of another John Eckstein, a painter who exhibited at the Royal Academy in London between 1787 and 1802. In 1803 he accompanied Samuel Hood to the "Diamond Rock" near Martinique. He then went to Barbados where he painted portraits of officers stationed on the island, and seems to have died in the West Indies in about 1838.

== See also ==
- List of German painters

== Sources ==
- Gerhard Bissell: Eckstein, Johannes in: Saur allgemeines Künstlerlexikon, Band 32: Ebersbach – Eimbke, Saur, München [u.a.] 2002, p. 112
- J. B. Manson: Eckstein, Johannes (John) I in: Thieme-Becker: Allgemeines Lexikon der bildenden Künstler, Band 10, Leipzig 1914, p. 331
- V. A. C.: Eckstein, Johannes (John) II in: Thieme-Becker: Allgemeines Lexikon der bildenden Künstler, Band 10, Leipzig 1914, pp. 331/332
- Rupert Gunnis: Dictionary of British sculptors, 1660-1851 1968, p. 139/140
- Grewolls, Grete (2011). Wer war wer in Mecklenburg und Vorpommern. Das Personenlexikon (in German). Rostock: Hinstorff Verlag. p. 2359. ISBN 978-3-356-01301-6.

Attribution:
