= Baron Northwick =

Barony in the Peerage of Great Britain

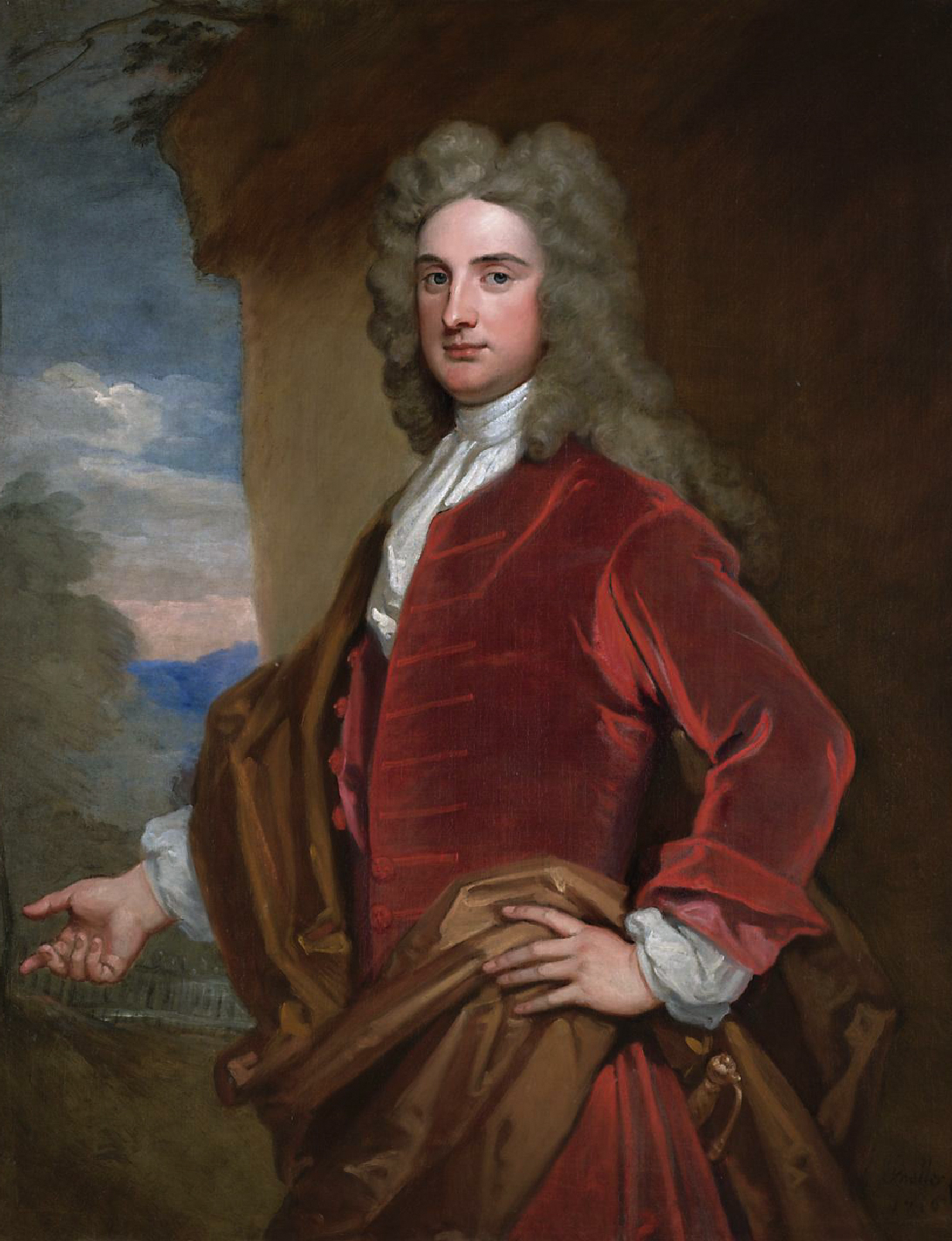
Sir John Rushout, 4th Baronet.

Baron Northwick, of Northwick Park in the County of Worcester, was a title in the Peerage of Great Britain. It was created in 1797 for Sir John Rushout, 5th Baronet, for many years Member of Parliament for Evesham. He was succeeded by his son, the second Baron, who was a noted collector of art. He, in turn, was succeeded by his nephew, the third Baron, the son of George Rushout-Bowles (who had assumed by Royal licence the additional surname of Bowles in 1817, which was that of his maternal grandfather Humphrey Bowles), younger son of the first Baron. He represented Evesham and Worcestershire East in Parliament. Lord Northwick had no surviving children and the titles became extinct on his death in 1887.

The Baronetcy, of Milnst in the County of Essex, was created in the Baronetage of England in 1661 for the 17-year-old James Rushout, subsequently Member of Parliament for Evesham and Worcestershire. He was the son of John Rushout, a Flemish merchant of London and Northwick, Worcestershire. Sir James's eldest son, the second Baronet, also represented Evesham in Parliament. This line of the family failed on the early death of the latter's son, the third Baronet, in 1711. The late Baronet was succeeded by his uncle, the fourth Baronet, the fourth son of the first Baronet. He was a politician and served as Treasurer of the Navy between 1743 and 1744. From 1762 to 1768 he was Father of the House of Commons. He was succeeded by his son, the aforementioned fifth Baronet, who was elevated to the peerage in 1797.

Harriet, daughter of the first Baron, married Sir Charles Cockerell, 1st Baronet. Their son Sir Charles Rushout Cockerell, 2nd Baronet, assumed the surname of Rushout in lieu of his patronymic (see Rushout Baronets).

== Rushout Baronet of Milnst, Essex (1661) ==
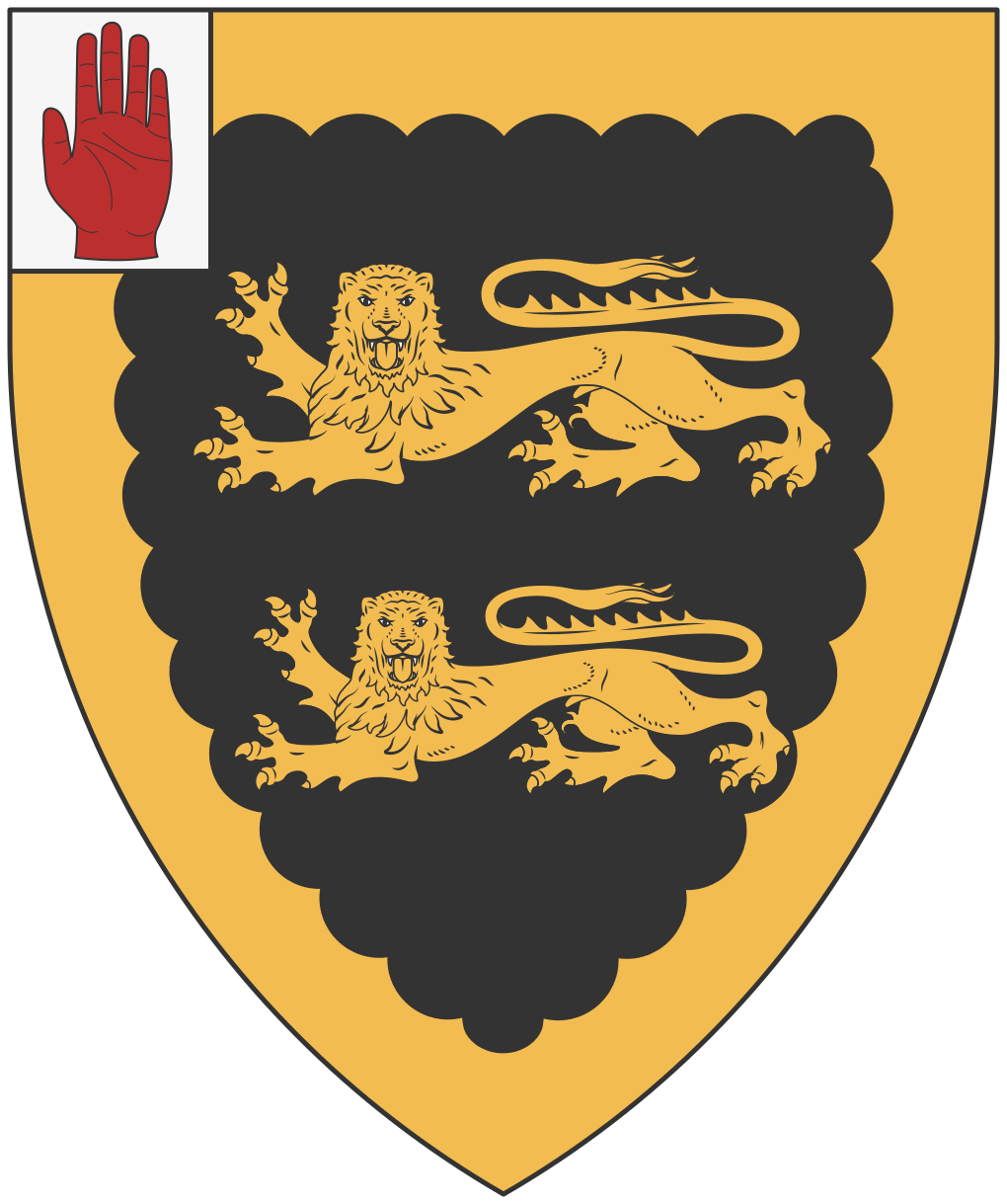
The coat of arms of the Rushout baronets and later Barons Northwick.

- Sir James Rushout, 1st Baronet (1644–1698)
- Sir James Rushout, 2nd Baronet (1676–1705)
- Sir James Rushout, 3rd Baronet (1701–1711)
- Sir John Rushout, 4th Baronet (1685–1775)
- Sir John Rushout, 5th Baronet (created Baron Northwick in 1797)

== Baron Northwick (1797) ==
- John Rushout, 1st Baron Northwick (1738–1800)
- John Rushout, 2nd Baron Northwick (1770–1859)
- George Rushout, 3rd Baron Northwick (1811–1887)
