= Northwick Park, Gloucestershire =

Coordinates: 52°1′41″N 1°45′20″W

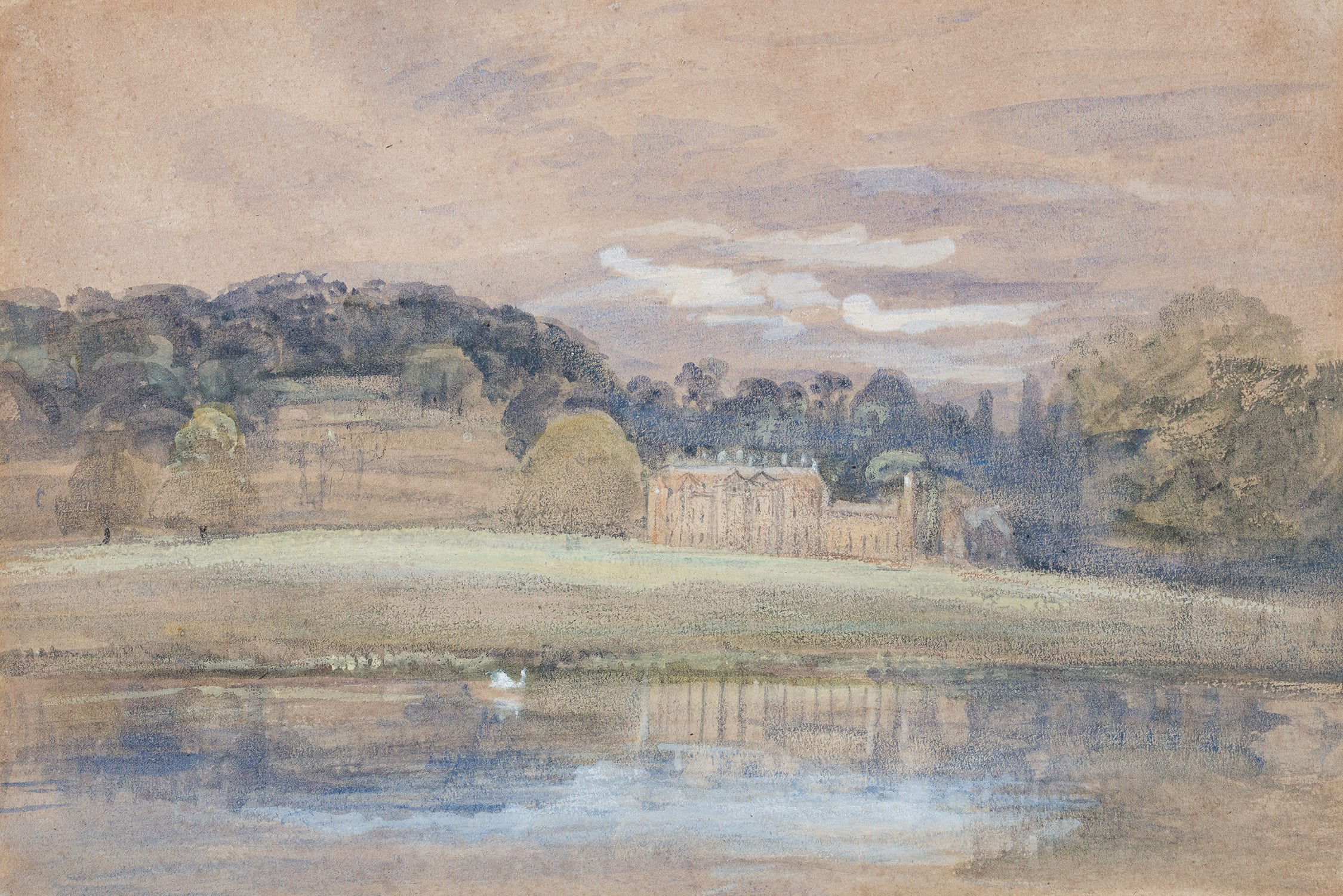
'Northwick House’, Northwick Park, Gloucestershire - watercolour painting by Frederick Christian Lewis

Northwick Park is a residential estate and business centre near Blockley in Gloucestershire, England. The estate is built in the grounds of the former family seat of the Rushout family, the Barons Northwick. The Northwick Park mansion, now divided into residential accommodation, is a Grade I listed building.

== History ==
In medieval times Northwick was a collection of smallholder's cottages surrounding a mansion owned by the Childe family. In 1683 it was bought by Sir James Rushout, Bt, the son of a rich Flemish merchant, who carried out extensive remodelling in 1686. The 4th Baronet continued the work, commissioning the architect Lord Burlington to design a Palladian east front and entrance hall in the 1730s. The 5th Baronet, later Baron Northwick, employed architect John Woolfe to carry out further improvements c.1828 and William Emes to landscape the parkland. It then passed down in the family to George Rushout, 3rd Baron Northwick, whose widow in 1912 left the estate to her grandson, Captain Edward George Spencer-Churchill (first cousin to Sir Winston Churchill), who moved into the mansion.

Because the area was under the authority of the Bishops of Worcester, it was actually a small enclave of the county of Worcestershire surrounded by Gloucestershire - and is shown that way on all maps prior to 1931, when such enclaves were rationalised.

The estate includes the site of the former hamlet of Northwick. During the Second World War, Northwick Park was an American field hospital. It became a camp for Polish displaced persons until the 1960s.

== Northwick Park collection ==
The second Baron was an avid collector of works of art, antiques and coins. Much of his collection was housed at Thirlestaine House in Cheltenham and in 1848 he published a catalogue of his holdings there. Although he died intestate and therefore his collection was sold after his death, many items were repurchased by the 3rd Baron. This collection passed to the Spencer-Churchill family. After the death of Captain EG Spencer-Churchill, the collection was sold by Christie's in 1965. Items from this collection can be found in the National Gallery, London and the Metropolitan Museum of Art. The provenance of items from the collection can be investigated using published catalogues of the 1859 sale, the 1864 sale and the 1965 sale. There is also an inventory of the collection produced in 1921 by Tancred Borenius.
