= Deary =

Deary can refer to:

== People ==
- Ian Deary, psychologist
- John Deary, English footballer
- Terry Deary, children's author
- Peter Deary, English musician

== Places ==
- Deary, Idaho, United States
