= John Dearie =

Banker and author

John Dearie is Executive Vice President for Policy at the Financial Services Forum. He joined the Forum in January 2001. The Financial Services Forum is an economic policy organization comprising the chief executive officers of 18 of the largest and most diversified financial institutions doing business in the United States.

He is also co-author of the book "Where the Jobs Are: Entrepreneurship and the Soul of the American Economy" (Wiley, 2013), which recounts the findings of roundtables conducted with entrepreneurs in 12 cities across the United States, and proposes a 30-point policy plan to accelerate economic growth and job creation based on what entrepreneurs told Mr. Dearie and his colleague Courtney Geduldig they need from policymakers.

== Early career ==
Mr. Dearie previously served as Managing Director of the Financial Services Volunteer Corps (FSVC), a not-for-profit, public-private partnership whose mission is to help build sound banking and financial systems in developing countries by structuring technical assistance and training missions staffed by financial sector professionals who serve as unpaid volunteers.

Mr. Dearie also spent nine years at the Federal Reserve Bank of New York, where he held positions in the Banking Studies, Foreign Exchange, and Policy and Analysis areas. He was appointed an Officer of the Bank in 1996. In addition to his regular duties, Mr. Dearie also served as a speechwriter for New York Fed presidents E. Gerald Corrigan and William McDonough.

== Education and Family ==
Mr. Dearie was educated at the University of Notre Dame and Columbia University’s School of International and Public Affairs. He lives with his wife and two children in Great Falls, Virginia.
