= Deere (automobile) =

American car manufacturer

Deere-Clark Motor Car Company
- Type: Automobile Manufacturing
- Industry: Automotive
- Genre: Touring cars
- Founded: 1906
- Founder: Charles Deere and W. E. Clark
- Defunct: 1907
- Headquarters: Moline, Illinois, United States
- Area served: United States
- Products: Automobiles; Automotive parts

The Deere-Clark Motor Car Company was a manufacturer of automobiles in Moline, Illinois from 1906 to 1907.

== History ==
The Deere was an American Automobile built by The Deere-Clark Motor Car Co. in 1906 and 1907. Charles Deere was president of The Deere-Clark Motor co. and W. E. Clark was vice-president.

== Advertisements ==
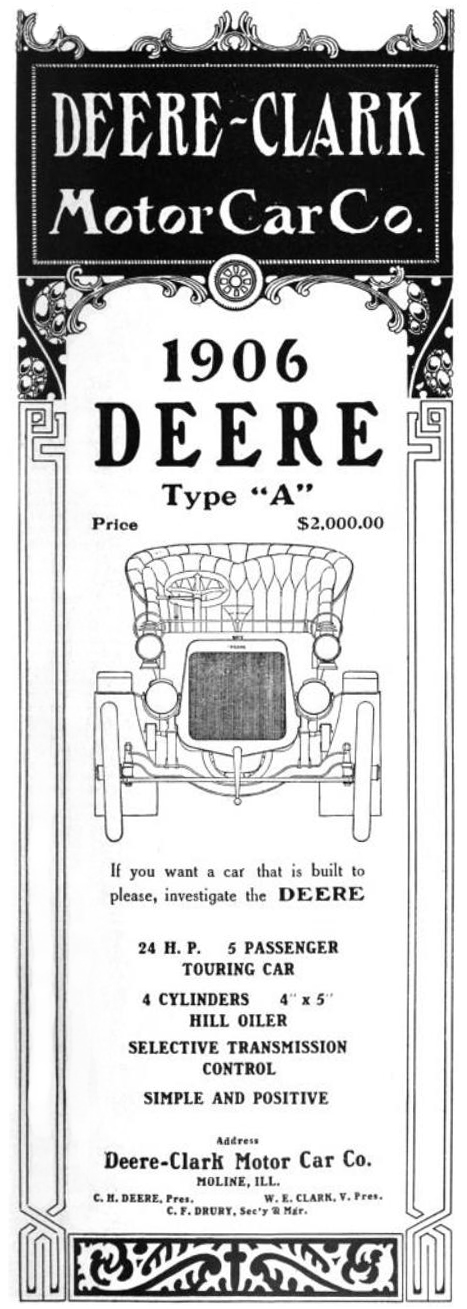
Deere-Clark Motor Car Company of Moline, Illinois - 1906

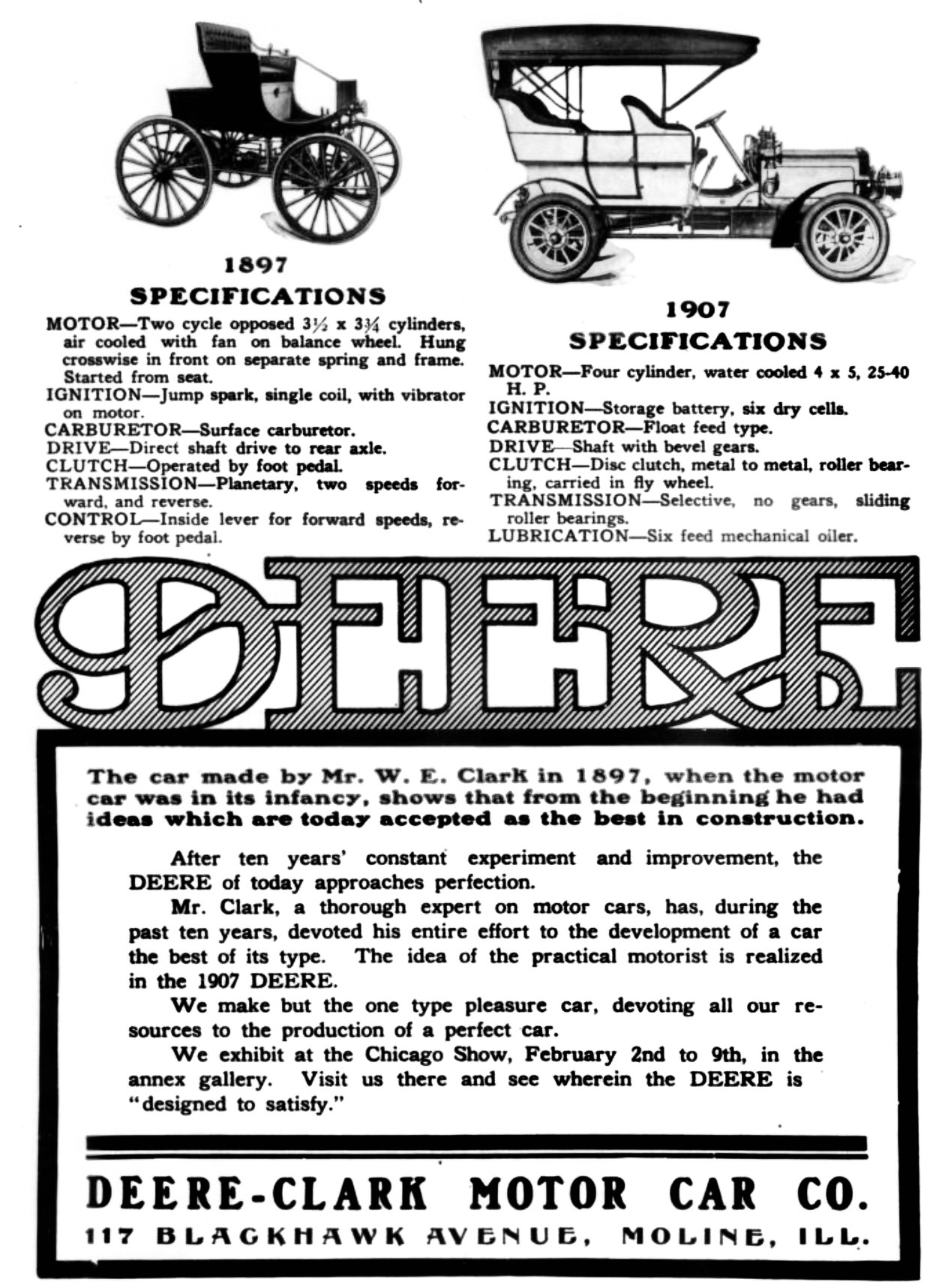
Deere-Clark advertisement (1907)

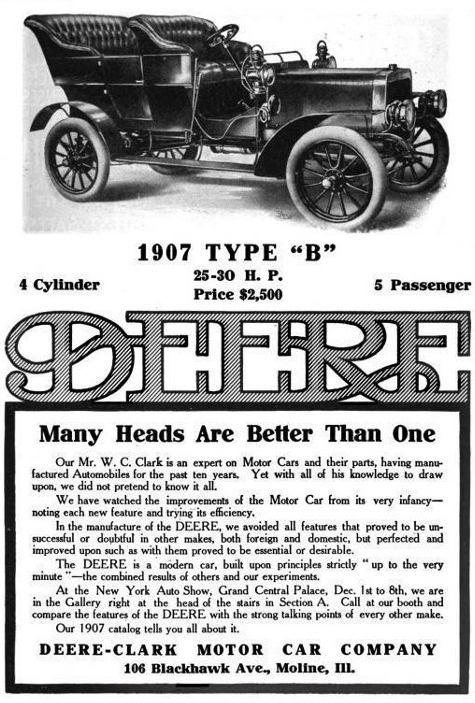
Deere-Clark Motor Car Company of Moline, Illinois - 1907
