= Rushout baronets =

Set index for Rushout baronets

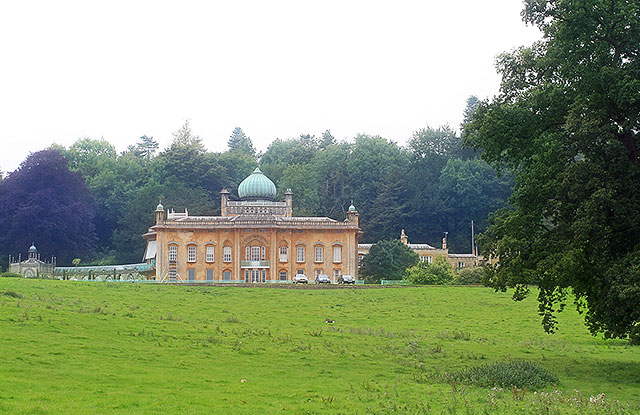
Sezincote House, the seat of the Rushout Baronets of Sezincote

There have been two baronetcies held by persons with the surname Rushout, one in the Baronetage of England and one in the Baronetage of the United Kingdom. Both creations are extinct.

- Rushout baronets of Milnst, Kent: see Baron Northwick
- Cockerell baronets of Sezincote (1809): later Rushout baronets
