= Sir John Rushout, 4th Baronet =

British army officer and politician (1685–1775)

The Right Honourable Sir John Rushout Bt
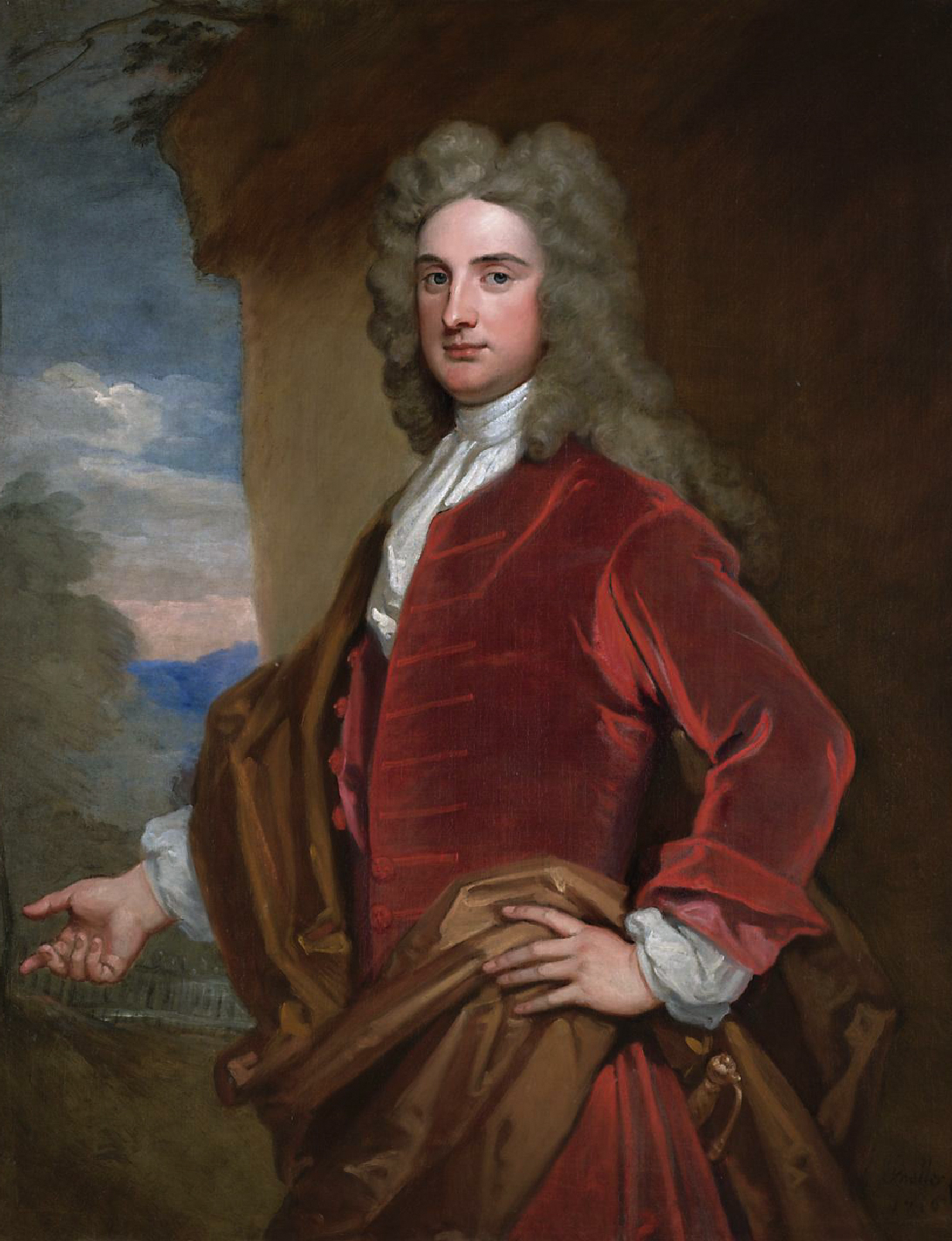
- Portrait by Sir Godfrey Kneller, 1716

Member of Parliament for Malmesbury
- In office 1713–1722
- Preceded by: Thomas Farrington; Joseph Addison
- Succeeded by: Giles Earle; John Fermor

Member of Parliament for Evesham
- In office 1722–1768
- Preceded by: John Deacle; John Rudge
- Succeeded by: George Durant; John Rushout

Personal details
- Born: 6 February 1685 England
- Died: 2 February 1775 (aged 89) England
- Spouse: Lady Anne Compton

Military service
- Allegiance: England; Great Britain
- Branch/service: English Army; British Army
- Years of service: c. 1698–1712
- Rank: Captain
- Unit: Royal Horse Guards

Captain Sir John Rushout, 4th Baronet, PC (6 February 1685 – 2 February 1775) was a British army officer and Whig politician who represented Malmesbury and Evesham in the House of Commons of Great Britain from 1713 to 1768. A supporter of William Pulteney and opponent of Robert Walpole, he was briefly part of the short-lived ministry. Rushout was Father of the House from 1762 until 1768.

== Early life and army career ==
John Rushout was the fourth son of Sir James Rushout, 1st Baronet and his wife, Alice Pitt, the daughter of Edmund Pitt. His elder brother James succeeded to the baronetcy on the death of his father. He graduated from Eton College in 1698 and joined the English Army. He was a cornet in the Royal Horse Guards in 1705 and was promoted to lieutenant in 1706. In 1710, he became captain. On the death of his nephew, the third baronet, on 21 September 1711 he succeeded to the baronetcy and most of the family's estates in Worcestershire. He resigned his British Army commission in January 1712 which he later claimed was to pre-empt his dismissal under the Duke of Ormond's policy of weeding out Whig officers in order to defeat the Hanoverian succession. In 1729, he married Lady Anne Compton, the sixth daughter of George Compton, 4th Earl of Northampton in 1729.

== Political career ==
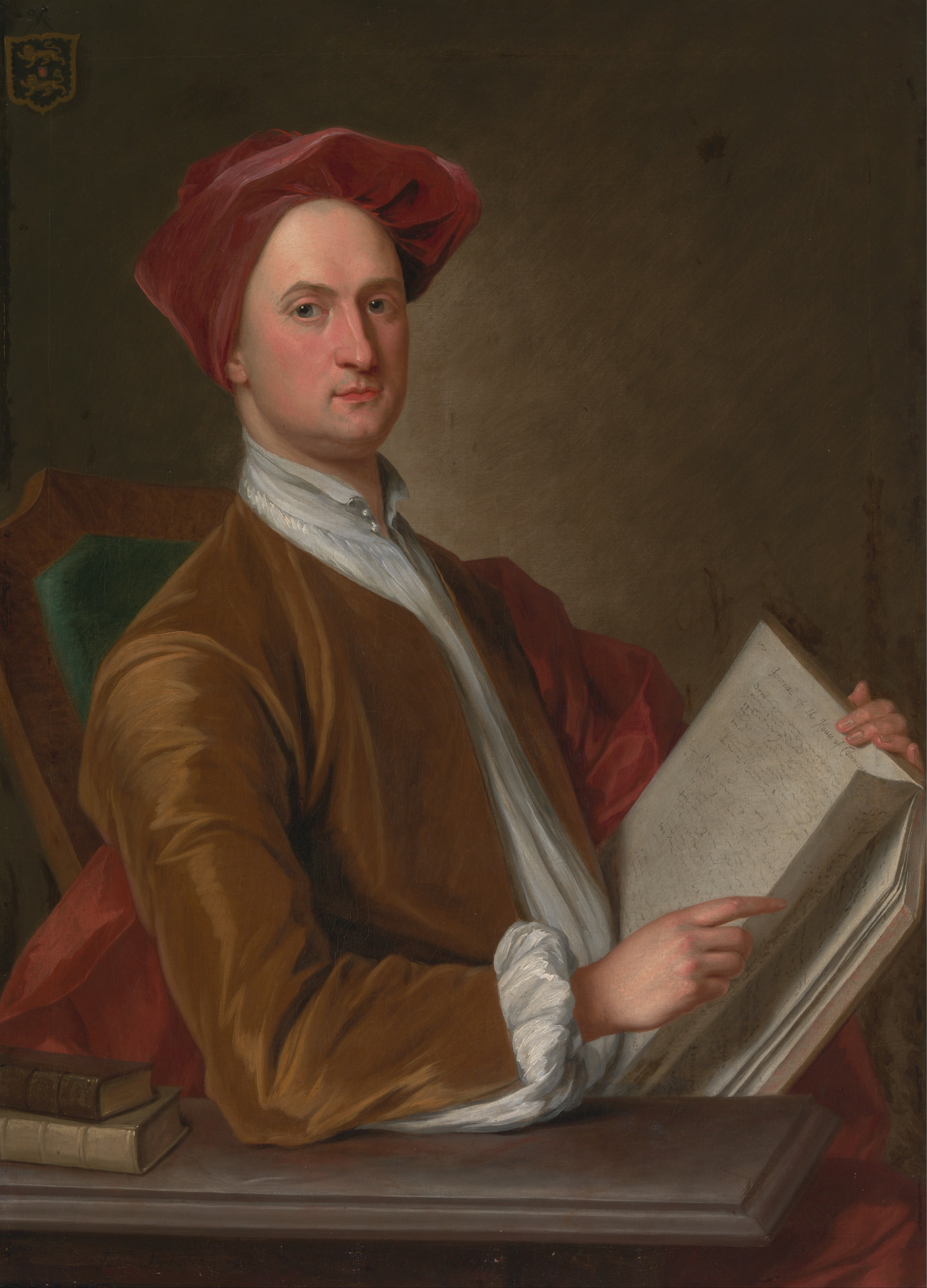
1726 portrait of Rushout by John Smibert

Rushout was elected at a by-election on 20 April 1713 as Whig Member of Parliament for Malmesbury, with the support of Lord Wharton. He voted against the French commerce bill on 18 June 1713. At the 1713 British general election, he stood without success at Evesham, but was returned unopposed for Malmesbury again. He voted against the expulsion of Richard Steele on 18 March 1714 and acted as a teller for the Whig side on the Harwich election petition on 16 July 1714.

At the 1715 British general election, Rushout was returned again as MP for Malmesbury. He voted against the septennial bill, but for the repeal of the Occasional Conformity and Schism Acts. He was absent from the vote on the Peerage Bill. At the 1722 British general election, he was returned for both Malmesbury and Evesham. However he was unseated on petition at Malmesbury on 13 December 1722, and so took up his seat at Evesham. He initiated the House of Commons inquiry into the Atterbury plot, and in 1725 sponsored the complaint leading to Lord Macclesfield's impeachment.

He then followed his friend, William Pulteney, into opposition. He spoke against a vote of credit on 25 March 1726, and introduced a bill against election bribery on 27 April which was lost in the House of Lords after being passed in the Commons. He was returned as MP for Evesham at the 1727 British general election and was a lieutenant to Pulteney, playing a leading role in the Whig opposition. He acted as Pulteney's second in his duel with Lord Hervey in 1731. He chaired a select committee of the House of Commons, whose report led to the passing of the Molasses Act. During the excise bill crisis in 1733 he was put down as secretary at war in the list of a new ministry prepared by the opposition leaders.

At the 1734 British general election, he was returned again for Evesham. He spoke in favour of increasing the allowance to Frederick, Prince of Wales on 22 February 1737. It was said he was a frequent and boring speaker, with a trick of always putting out one leg and looking at it while speaking. At the 1741 British general election, he was returned again as MP for Evesham.

On the fall of Walpole in 1742, Rushout, with Samuel Sandys, and Phillips Gybbon became Pulteney's representatives on the new Treasury board, where they combined to outvote the first lord, Wilmington. He was elected to the secret committee of enquiry into the Walpole ministry, but defended John Scrope, the secretary of the Treasury, for refusing to give evidence. When Pelham replaced Wilmington, under a compromise, Rushout was appointed Treasurer of the Navy in 1743 and was made a Privy Counsellor in 1744.

However, he was turned out of office with most of Bath's followers in 1744. He spoke against the Queen of Hungary's subsidy on 18 February 1745 with the intention of sowing dissensions between the Old Whigs and the Government's new allies. He also refused to make any payments from the sums standing in his account as treasurer of the navy, thus holding up payments, for 8 or 9 months, to all the seamen who had not received their pay up to the date of his dismissal.

When Bath and Granville made their abortive attempt to form what became known as the "short-lived ministry" in February 1746, he was expected to be appointed Leader of the House of Commons, but Pulteney's attempt to form a government collapsed before Rushout could be offered the position. He was returned at Evesham at the 1747 British general election and joined the Leicester House party. He was put down to have a peerage and the pay office when the Prince came to the throne. After Frederick's death in 1751 he attached himself to Newcastle in the hopes of a peerage .

At the 1754 British general election, Rushout was returned head of the poll for Evesham after a contest. At the 1761 British general election, he stood together with his son, and after another hard contest they were both returned. He became the longest standing member (Father of the House) in 1762. In the debates on Wilkes's privilege in November 1763, he spoke against the Grenville ministry, and voted against them in the division on general warrants in February 1764. He opposed the repeal of the cider duty, despite representing a cider producing county. He became less regular in his attendance and retired on account of age at the 1768 British general election.

== Death and legacy ==
Rushout died on 2 February 1775 leaving a son and two daughters. He was succeeded in the baronetcy by his son John.

== Sources ==
- Oxford Dictionary of National Biography
- Catalogue Notes for the portrait by Godfrey Kneller

Parliament of Great Britain
Preceded by Thomas Farrington; Joseph Addison	Member of Parliament for Malmesbury; 1713–1722; With: Joseph Addison to 1719; Fleetwood Dormer 1719 – March 1722; Viscount Hillsborough from March 1722	Succeeded by Giles Earle; John Fermor
Preceded by John Deacle; John Rudge	Member of Parliament for Evesham; 1722–1768; With: John Rudge to 1734; William Taylor 1734–1741; Edward Rudge 1741–1754; John Porter 1754–1756; Edward Rudge 1756–1761; John Rushout from 1761	Succeeded by George Durant; John Rushout
Preceded by Phillips Gybbon	Father of the House; 1762–1768	Succeeded by William Aislabie
Baronetage of England
Preceded by James Rushout	Baronet (of Milnst); 1711–1775	Succeeded by John Rushout
