= John Deare =

British artist

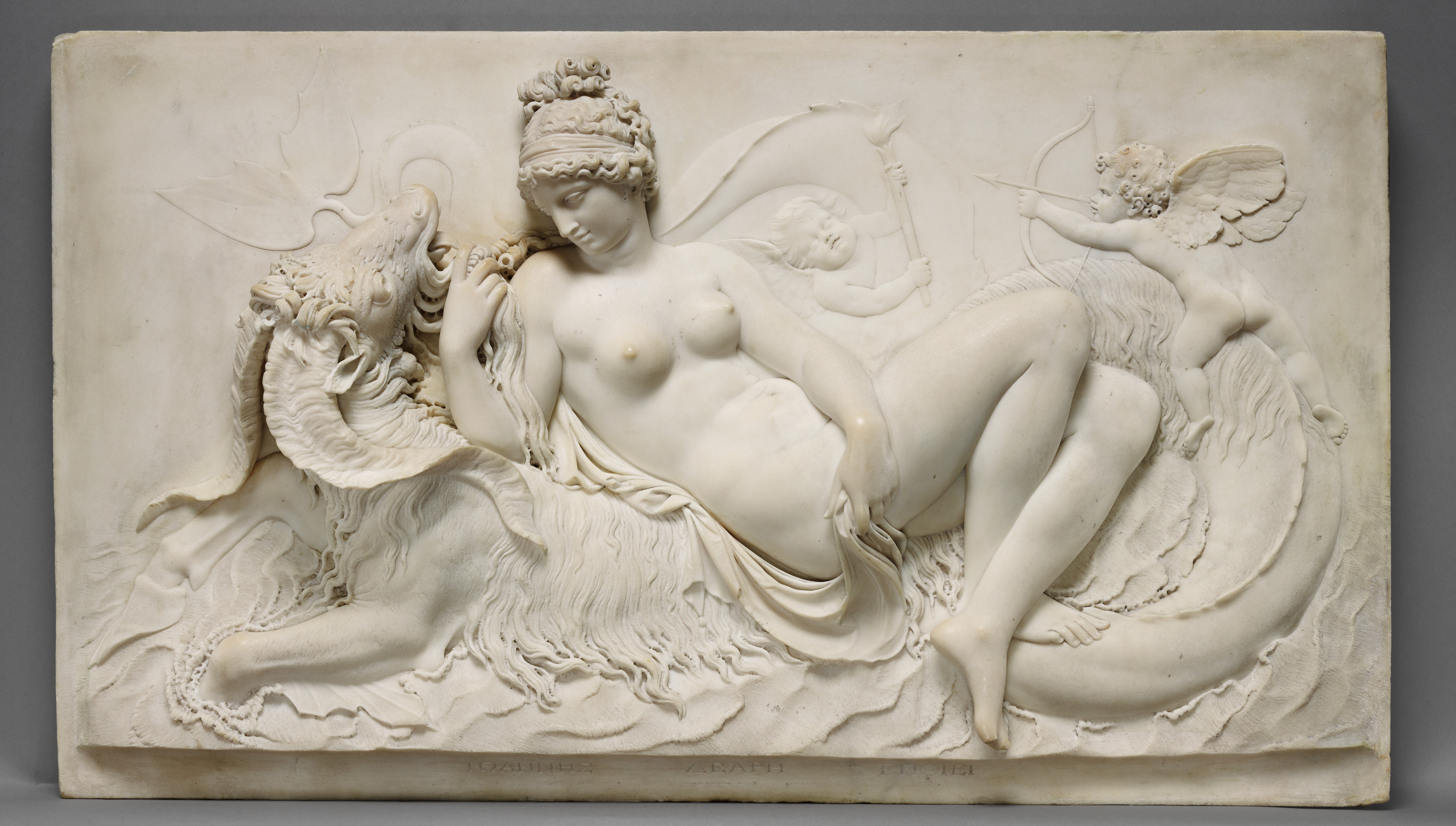
Venus Reclining on a Sea Monster with Cupid and a Putto, 1790 (Getty Museum)

John Deare (26 October 1759, Liverpool – 17 August 1798, Rome) was a British neo-classical sculptor. His nephew Joseph (1803–1835) was also a sculptor.

== Life ==
Born to a jeweller in Liverpool, John Deare enrolled at the Royal Academy Schools in 1777, where he won a gold medal for a Miltonic subject (1780). Meanwhile he also served an apprenticeship to the London carver Thomas Carter from 1776 to 1783, before setting up on his own. He continued to produce work for his old master as well as for John Bacon and John Cheere. Independent commissions included the reliefs The War of Jupiter and the Titans in plaster for Whitton Park's pediment and The Good Samaritan (post-1782) for the Liverpool Dispensary. Deare was himself admired by his contemporaries, particularly by Joseph Nollekens. However, his only surviving early works are those he produced to be made in ceramic by Derby for clocks by Benjamin Vulliamy.

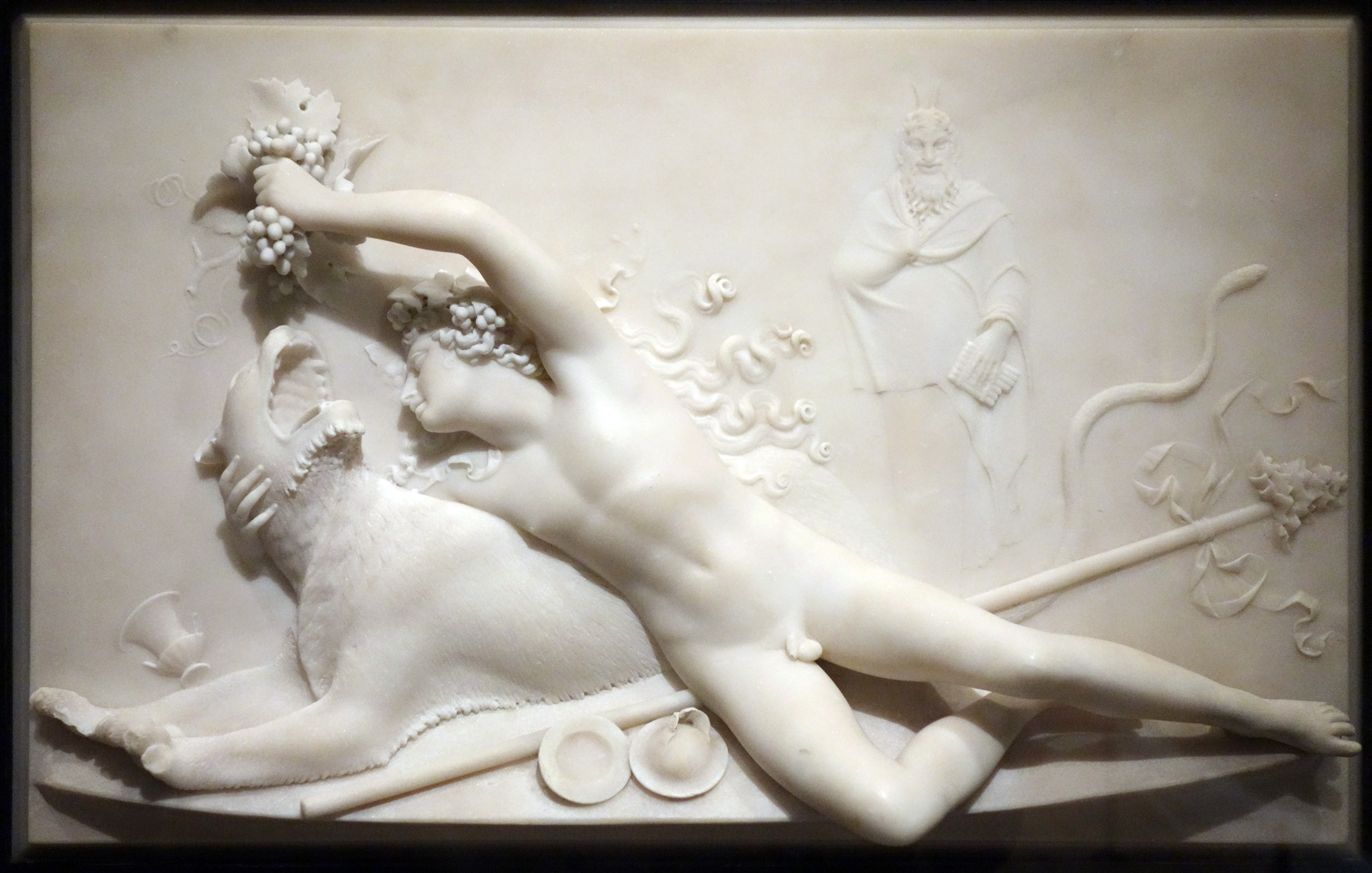
Bacchus Feeding a Panther, 1792 (Art Institute of Chicago)

The Royal Academy gave him a pension for a three-year stay in Rome (on the condition he sent back a work to the RA's annual exhibition). Starting in 1785, he drew the classical sculpture collections at (among others) the Villa Albani and the Capitoline Museums. He set up an artistic circle including Robert Fagan, Charles Grignion the Younger, Samuel Woodforde and George Cumberland. For his exhibition piece he modelled in plaster The Judgement of Jupiter (with over 20 figures and emulating history painting of the time, it was the largest 18th-century relief by a British artist) but the Academy argued with him over its size and it was not sent to London. A marble version however, was commissioned by Sir Richard Worsley in 1788, and is now in the Los Angeles County Museum of Art. He produced a relief of Edward and Eleanor (drawn from a play by James Thomson) for Sir George Corbett and commanded a price of £700 for a statue of Apollo for Lord Berwick. He also acted as an agent for Thomas Hope and the Earl of Bristol in their acquisition of works by his friend John Flaxman and for Henry Blundell and John Latouche in acquiring works by Canova, all four of whom also bought works by Deare.

After his pension expired he found that he was so in demand in Rome that he was able to settle there and finance himself through carving copies of classical sculptures for British Grand Tourists, restoring classical sculptures for collectors and by producing chimneypieces for patrons. This last included one at Frogmore House for the Prince of Wales (employing Joseph Gandy and other architects for the purpose).

By his death in Rome in 1798 Deare had married an Italian woman, who he left with their children as a widow and for whose benefit Deare's friends such as Vincenzo Pacetti and Christopher Hewetson posthumously disposed of his studio contents. There are conflicting accounts of how he died. One story says that after sleeping on a block of marble hoping for inspiration he caught a chill and died. Another says that was thrown into a dungeon by a jealous French officer who had amorous intent towards his wife. Three days after his death he was buried in Rome's Protestant Cemetery.

== Works ==
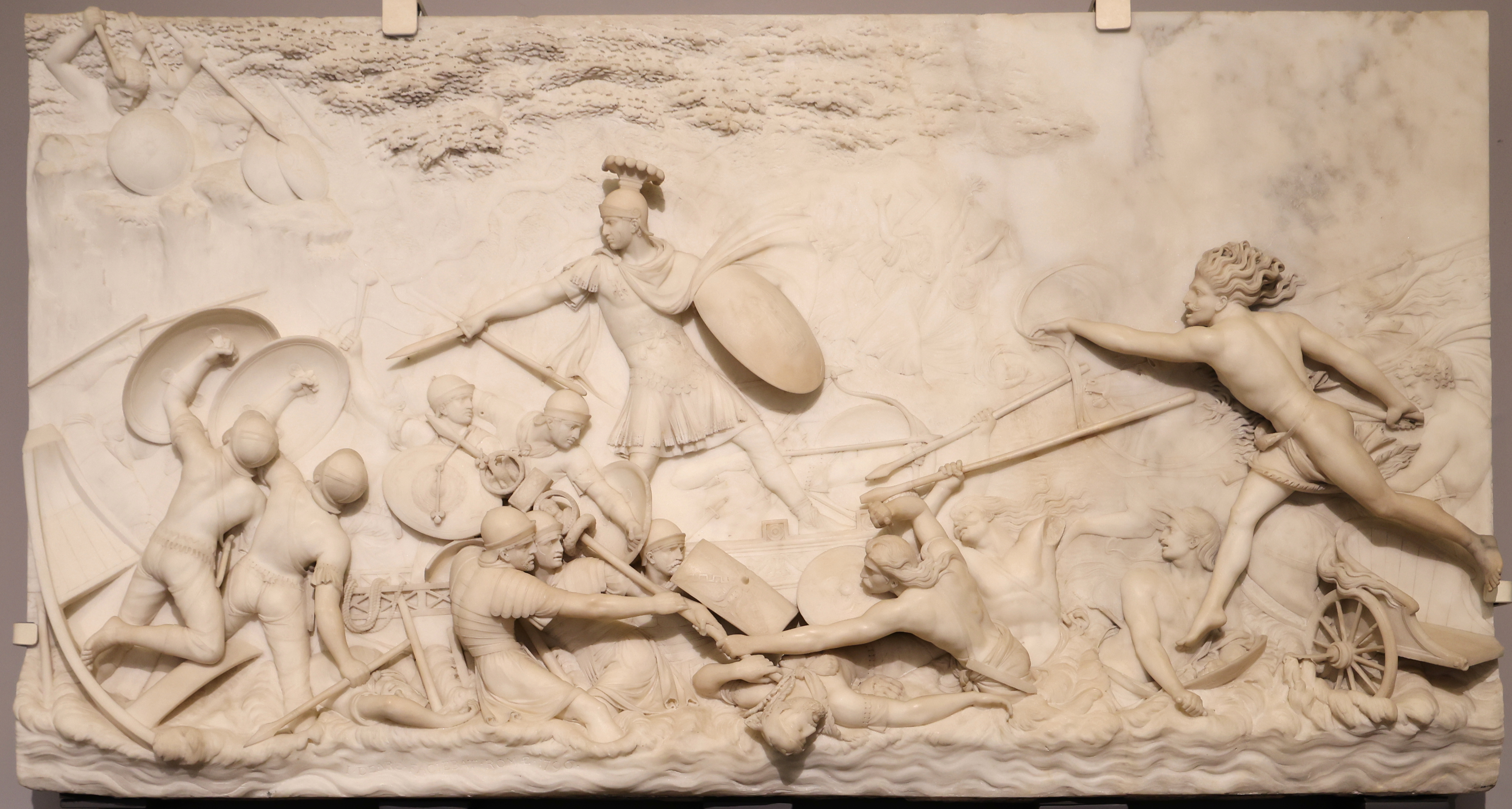
The Landing of Julius Caesar in Britain, 1796 (Victoria and Albert Museum)

- The Judgement of Jupiter (1787), marble relief in the Los Angeles County Museum
- Edward and Eleanor (1790), marble relief in the Victoria and Albert Museum; formerly in the collection of Sir Andrew Corbet Corbet, Adderley Hall, Shropshire
- Venus Reclining on a Sea Monster with Cupid and a Putto (1790), marble relief in the Getty Museum; formerly in the collection of Sir Richard Worsley
- Cupid and Psyche (1791), marble relief, for Thomas Hope (plaster version, Lyons House, co. Kildare)
- Bacchus Feeding a Panther (1792), marble relief in the Art Institute of Chicago
- John Penn (1793), portrait bust in Eton College
- The Landing of Julius Caesar in Britain (1796), marble relief in the Victoria and Albert Museum; formerly in the collection of John Penn at Stoke Park, Buckinghamshire

=== Classical copies ===
- Apollo Belvedere, commissioned in 1792 for Attingham by Lord Berwick
- Faun with a Kid (Prado Museum, Madrid), acquired by Lord Cloncurry (private collection)
- Bust of Ariadne (c.1789, now in the Capitoline Museum, Rome), for John Latouche
