= St Mary the Virgin, Hanbury =

Coordinates: 52°16′40″N 2°04′06″W

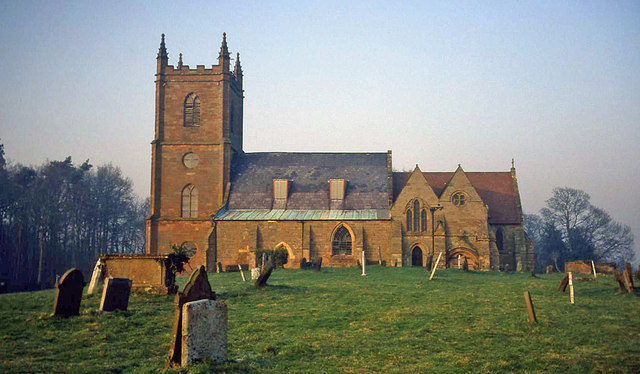
- Church of St Mary the Virgin, Hanbury

- Location in Worcestershire
- Location: Hanbury, Worcestershire
- Country: England
- Denomination: Anglican
- Website: http://www.hanburychurch.org/

History
- Status: Parish church
- Founded: c. 1210
- Dedication: Saint Mary the Virgin

Architecture
- Functional status: Active

Administration
- Province: Canterbury
- Diocese: Worcester

Clergy
- Priest: The Reverend Sally Morris

The church of St Mary the Virgin is an Anglican parish church in the village of Hanbury, Worcestershire. Its earliest parts date from about 1210 and it is a Grade I listed building. The church was the family church for the Vernon family of nearby Hanbury Hall.

== Exterior ==
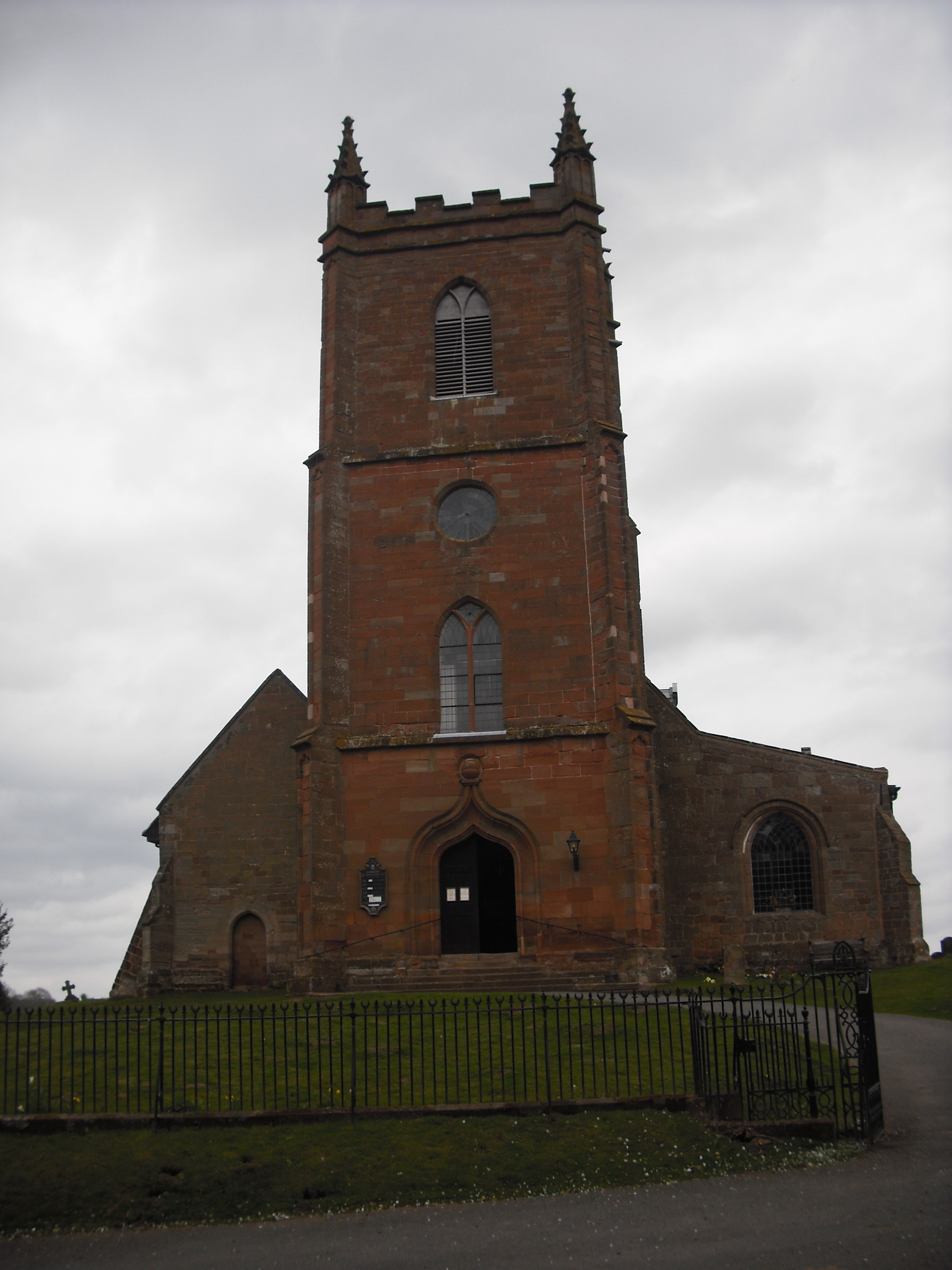
St Mary the Virgin, Hanbury - from the south

The church, in the Early English and Georgian styles, is of part-dressed, coursed sandstone rubble and part sandstone ashlar, with slate and plain tiled roofs with parapets at the gable ends.

There is a tower at the west, which was rebuilt in 1793, with three stages, three strings and a chamfered plinth. It has diagonal corner buttresses and pointed-arched cusped panels. The lowest stage of the tower serves as a porch and west entrance. It has a heavily moulded ogee-arched and tall finialed surround. There is a large oculus in the side elevation and north pointed doorway. The second stage of the tower has pointed Y-traceried windows with sill string and an oculus above. The belfry stage has similar windows with louvred openings and above is a panelled frieze and embattled parapet with crocketted corner pinnacles which was restored in the mid-20th century.

There are two windows with pointed arches, incorporating some 14th-century stonework, but without tracery. The easternmost arch is blocked and there are two square-headed windows. The west end elevation has a blocked pointed doorway.

The south aisle has a single pitch roof, diagonal corner buttresses and also buttresses at the bay divisions. There is a blocked doorway and window to the west and a pointed window, without tracery, in the second bay from the east. The west end elevation has a pointed window reconstructed from 13th century masonry, with a hood mould. In the nave roof there are two flat-roofed dormers.

The chancel, dated from about 1860, is by G. E. Street. There are three bays with buttresses at the gable ends and a three-light east window has a hood mould with foliated stops and continuous sill string. Pointed windows, without tracery, are located at the north-east and south-east ends. The north transept gable end has four cusped lancets beneath a rose window. The vestry projects from its east side elevation and has three cusped lancets, a door facing north and a rose window in its east gable end. The south transept has a parallel east wing.

In the churchyard, along the woods to the north, is the grave of Emma Vernon (1754–1818), who inherited the Hanbury Estate. The churchyard also contains a war grave of a Royal Corps of Signals soldier of World War II.

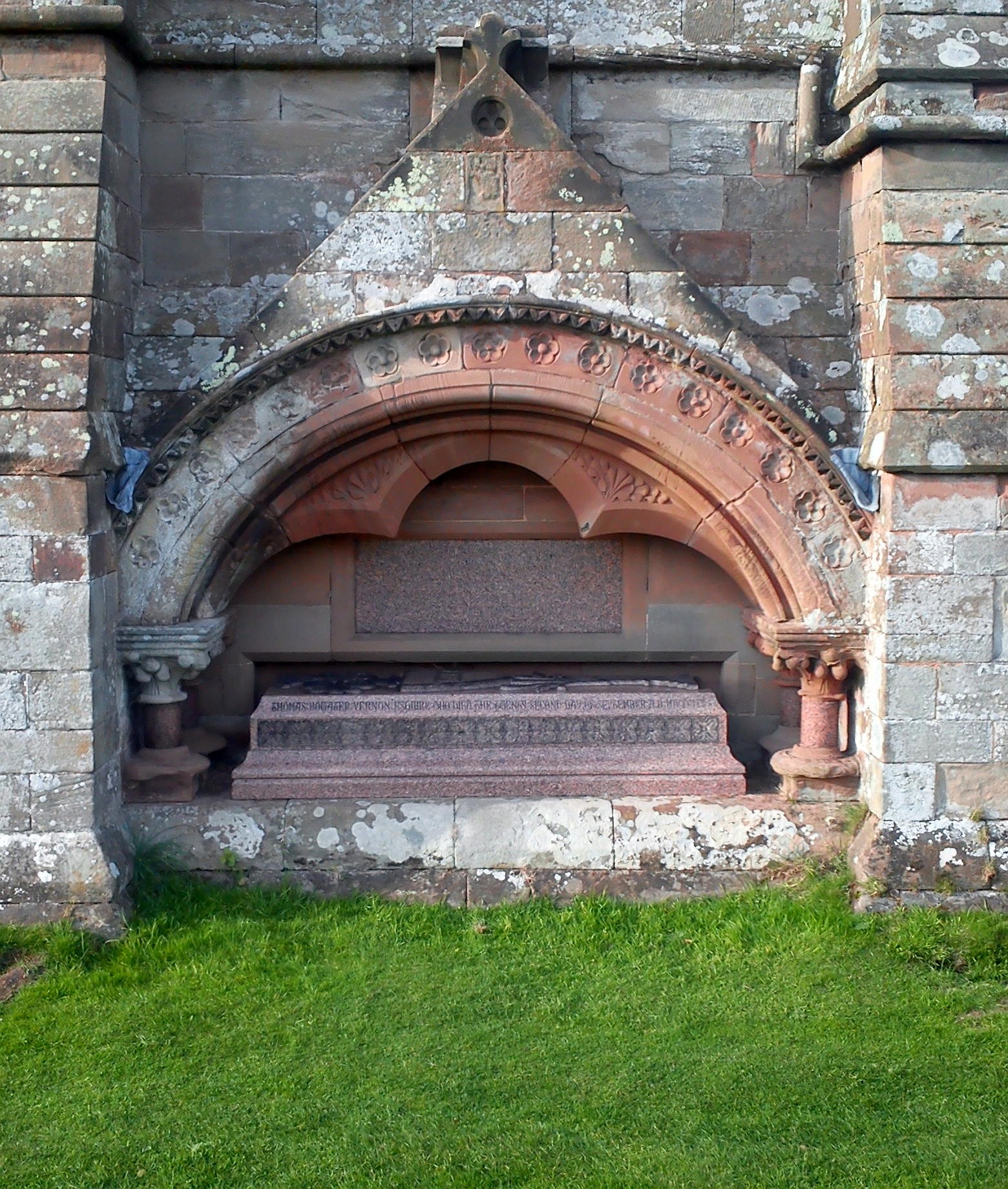
Tomb of Thomas Bowater Vernon, of Hanbury Hall, outside the Vernon Chapel

The vestry and transept house the Vernon Chapel which has a transept gable end and a central pointed doorway with nookshafts and an outer dog-tooth and an inner rosette moulding. Above is a three-light window with hood mould and foliated stops. The adjacent gable end has at its base a gabled monument to Thomas Bowater Vernon (died 1859). Above is a rose window with a hood mould returning to form a string. The east-side elevation has a dog-tooth eaves moulding and a three light window.

== Interior ==
There is a four-bay nave with north and south aisles, a three-bay chancel with north and south transepts, a north vestry and a south chapel. Inside the porch a railed wooden staircase provides access to the belfry and the western gallery.

The south arcade, from about 1210, has circular columns, one still with a trumpet-scalloped capital. The north arcade has octagonal columns and re-used 14th century capitals. The pointed tower arch, of three chamfered orders, is blocked and flanked by semi-circular headed niches. The chancel arch is pointed, has dog-tooth moulding and is supported on short columns with foliated capitals. Similar detailing has been used by Street throughout the chancel.

Throughout the church there are wagon roofs, plastered in the nave and aisles and ornately painted in the chancel and transepts. The chancel has piscina, sedilia and aumbry, above which the continuous east window sill string forms a hood.

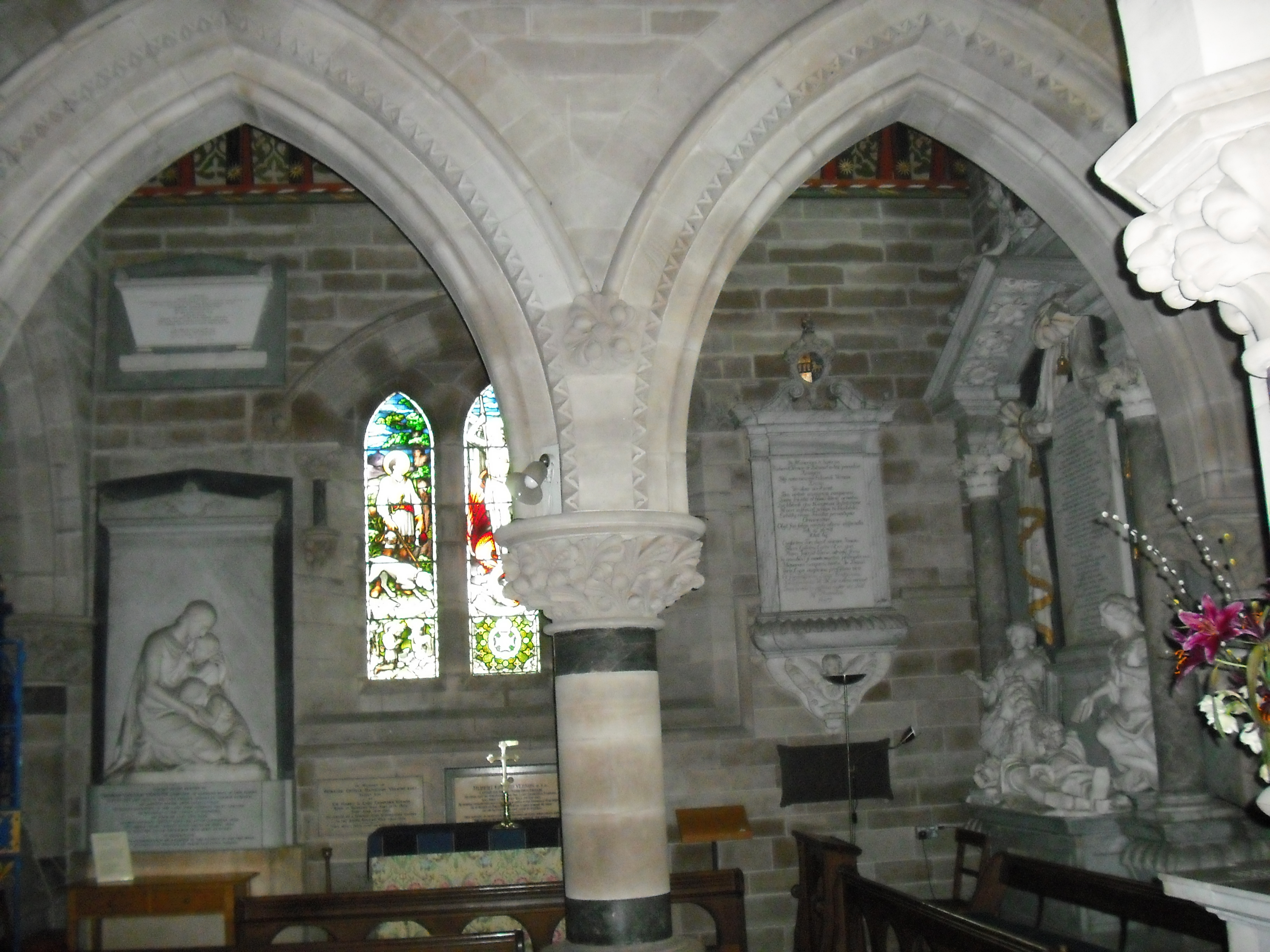
The Vernon Chapel

There are numerous memorials including, in the Vernon Chapel, a large monument to Thomas Vernon (died 1721) by Stanton and Horsnaile. It has a semi-reclining effigy flanked by the figures of Justice and Learning and behind this, Corinthian columns supporting an open pediment. There is also a standing monument of Bowater Vernon (died 1835) by Roubiliac, a large marble relief panel by Chantrey to Thomas Taylor Vernon (died 1837) and a late 17th-century memorial to Richard Vernon (died 1678).

In the chancel is a wall memorial to Richard Vernon (died 1627) with two kneeling figures set within a recess. In the nave is a large relief panel to Thomas Vernon (died 1771). The east window of the Vernon Chapel and north transept there is 19th century glass.

The peal of eight bells dates from 1678 and is in excellent order. They are tuned to the key of F sharp. Hung in an iron frame, the tenor has a weight of fourteen hundredweight.

== History ==
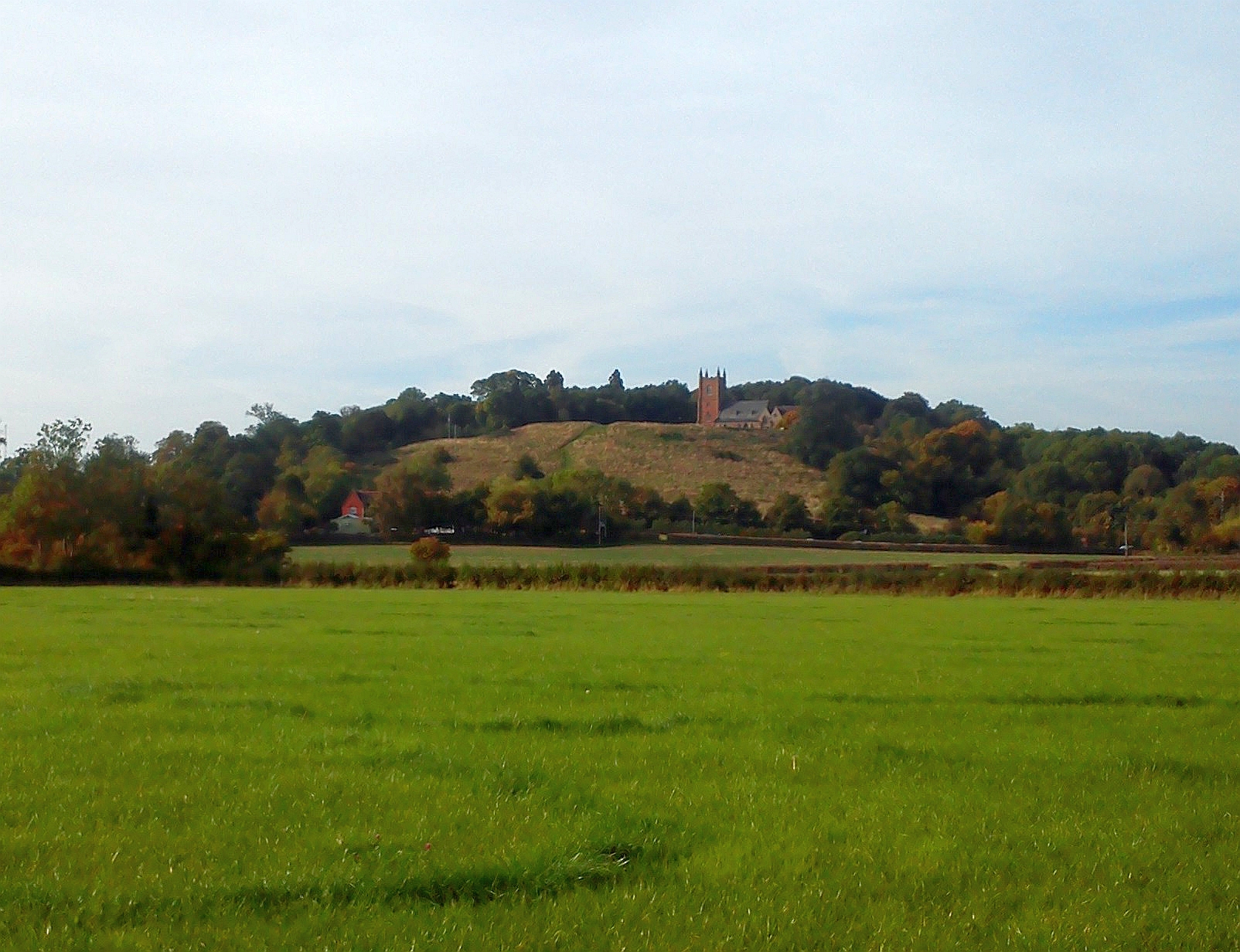
The Hanbury Church Hill with St Mary's

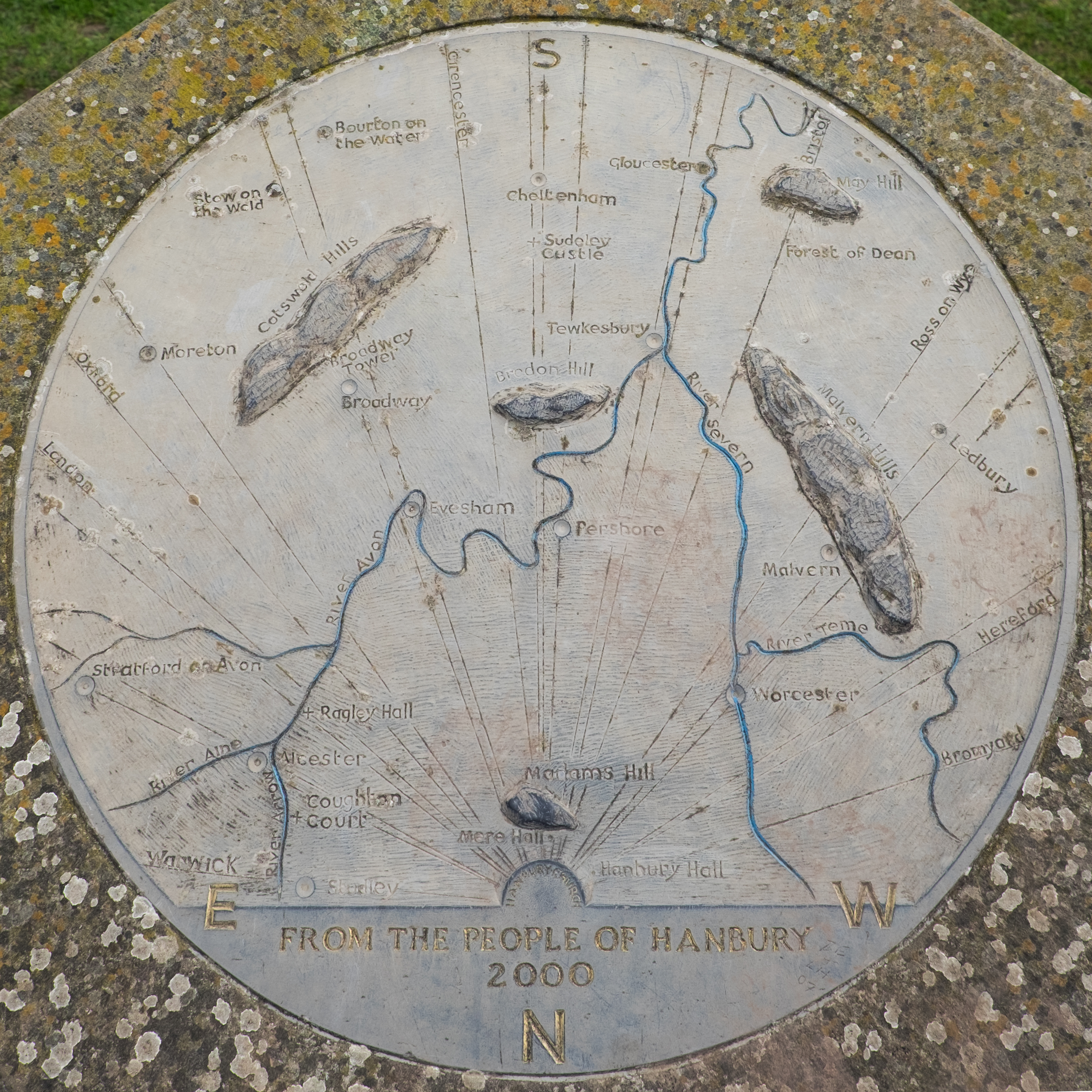
The plate on the toposcope in the churchyard

The church was restored in about 1860 by George Edmund Street.

Bowater Vernon gifted a silver-gilt Communion service by Huguenot silversmith Simon Pantin.

== Administration and activities ==
The parish is in the Anglican Diocese of Worcester, in turn part of the Province of Canterbury.

The church enjoys regular bell ringing organised by Worcestershire & Districts Change Ringing Association.

The church has played the role of St Stephen's Church in the fictional village of Ambridge in the BBC Radio 4 series The Archers, being the venue for several recordings beginning withe the marriage of Phil and Grace Archer.
