= Anthony Keck (Tiverton MP) =

English lawyer and politician

Sir Anthony Keck

Member of Parliament for Tiverton
- In office 1691–1695 Serving with Thomas Bere
- Preceded by: Thomas Bere; Samuel Foote
- Succeeded by: Thomas Bere; Lord Spencer

Personal details
- Born: 1630 Mickleton, Gloucestershire
- Died: December 1695 (aged 64–65) Bell Yard, London
- Spouse: Mary Thorne (after 1660)
- Relations: Anthony James Keck 1740-1782 of Stoughton Grange, MP for Leicester 1765-68 was his 3x great nephew, descended from his eldest brother, Thomas.
- Parent(s): Nicholas Keck; Margaret Morris

Sir Anthony Keck (1630 – December 1695) was an English lawyer and politician. He was a member of Parliament between 1691 and 1695, and served as Commissioner of the Great Seal from 1689 to 1690.

== Early life ==
Keck was born at Mickleton, Gloucestershire and was baptised on 28 March 1630. He was the fifth son of Nicholas Keck, originally of Marston Sicca, (Long Marston) Gloucestershire, and also of Swalcliffe in Oxfordshire. His mother was Margaret Morris, daughter of John Morris of Bretforton, Worcestershire. The Kecks were one of the significant families in Marston Sicca in the 1500s and 1600s. In 1577 Anthony's grandfather, John Keck, with John Tomes, both yeomen, purchased the land and Manor of Long Marston, (but not the title) from the Earl of Leicester for £1180,58s 4d.

== Career ==
Keck was admitted to the Inner Temple in 1653, called to the bar in 1659, and was elected a bencher (a member of the governing body) in 1677. He developed a flourishing chancery practice. During the Popish Plot, he acted as counsel for William Howard, 1st Viscount Stafford, who was executed for treason in 1680, and made something of a name for himself in cases before the House of Lords. He published, anonymously, a series of law reports in 1697.

On 4 March 1689, he was named Commissioner of the Great Seal with Sir John Maynard and Serjeant Rawlinson by the new King William III – these commissioners replaced the notorious Judge Jeffreys as Lord Chancellor, who fled as James II left the country. Knighted the next day, Keck held office till 14 May 1690: his decision to step down was described as a great act of self-denial.

He also served as MP for Tiverton from 1691. Despite being almost crippled by gout, he played a keen part in debates, but he developed a very poor opinion of the House of Commons, calling it "a bear garden", poorly attended, and with most of the MPs who did attend being drunk or asleep. He did not stand for election in 1695, probably due to his failing health.

Roger North wrote that Keck had "raised himself by his wits" and described him as a republican by inclination who would settle in default for a monarchy held in check. In character he was "a polite, merry genius", apart from a certain "hardness" caused by his chronic gout.

== Personal life ==
The Chandos portrait, thought to be of William Shakespeare, which was owned by Keck's granddaughter Margaret, Duchess of Chandos

On 11 June 1660, Keck married Mary Thorne, daughter of Francis Thorne. He died a very rich man, although he had to provide for one son and no less than nine daughters, including:

- Francis Keck (d. 1728), who married Jane Dunch.
- Catherine Keck, who married the Hon. Ferdinando Tracy (d. 1682) in 1680. Tracy, a younger son of John Tracy, 3rd Viscount Tracy. After his death in 1682, she married Edward Chute, who inherited the famous country house The Vyne, Hampshire.
- Mary Keck, who married Thomas Vernon of Hanbury Hall, MP for Worcestershire, in 1680.
- Elizabeth Keck (d. 1699), who married Richard Freeman, a barrister who ended his career as Lord Chancellor of Ireland.
- Ann Keck, who married Richard Whitehead.
- Margaret Keck, who married Thomas Barber.
- Macrina Keck, who married Edward Cressenor.
- Martha Keck, who married Edward Cressenor after the death of Macrina in 1697
- Winifred Keck (d. 1740), who married John Nicholl of Colney Hatch.
- Anthonina Keck (unmarried)

Keck died in his house in Bell Yard, Chancery Lane, off the Strand in December 1695. and was buried at Blunsdon in Wiltshire. He left property in Drury Lane, Fulham, Hampstead, Gloucestershire and Wiltshire to his only son Francis, with provision to lay out £29,000 on further purchases of lands for him.

=== Descendants ===
Anthony's son, Francis, died in 1728, and his son, John, and daughter, Mary Dutton, died without issue in 1729.

Through his daughter Catherine, he was a grandfather of John Tracy of Stanway House, who married Anne Atkins (the only daughter of Sir Robert Atkins of Saperton, Chief Baron of the Exchequer). They were parents of Anthony Keck who married Lady Susan Hamilton (a daughter of James Hamilton, 4th Duke of Hamilton) in 1736. Anthony, a protégé of the Duke of Marlborough and an MP for Woodstock, succeeded to his great-uncle Francis Keck's estates at Great Tew in Oxfordshire in 1729, adopting the name of Keck according to a condition of the bequest.

Through his daughter Elizabeth, he was a grandfather of Mary Freeman, who married Walter Edwards and had issue.

Through his daughter Winifred, he was a grandfather of John Nicholl, whose daughter was the great heiress Margaret Nicholl (1736–1768) who married James Brydges, 3rd Duke of Chandos but had no issue. Margaret inherited from her cousin Robert Keck the famous portrait, allegedly of William Shakespeare, which is now called the Chandos portrait.

Parliament of England
Preceded by Thomas Bere; Samuel Foote	Member of Parliament for Tiverton; 1691–1695; With: Thomas Bere	Succeeded by Thomas Bere; Lord Spencer
