= Burslem (disambiguation) =

Burslem is a town in Stoke-on-Trent, Staffordshire.

Burslem may also refer to:

== People ==
- Alexandra Burslem (born 1940), British academic and educationalist
- Henry Burslem (1790–1866)
- Nathaniel Burslem (1837–1865), war hero
- Oliver Burslem

== Other uses ==
- Burslem (UK Parliament constituency)
- "Burslem Normals", a song by Robbie Williams
