= Roger Acherley =

English lawyer, constitutional writer and politician

Roger Acherley (ca. 1665–16 April 1740) was an English lawyer, constitutional writer and politician.

== Biography ==
He was the son and heir of John Acherley of Stanwardine, or Stottesdon, Shropshire, where he was the representative of a long-established family. Acherley was admitted a student of the Inner Temple on 6 March 1685, and called to the bar on 24 May 1691 (Inner Temple Register). He married Elizabeth, only daughter of Richard Vernon, of Hanbury, Worcestershire, and sister of Thomas Vernon, a celebrated lawyer, known especially for his Reports, posthumously published, on the ‘Cases argued and adjudged in the High Court of Chancery.’ For some years Acherley was engaged in disputing the will of Thomas Vernon, who died in 1721. The case was finally given against Acherley, on an appeal before the House of Lords, on 4 February 1725.

Acherley was probably the first person who, in 1712, advised the moving of the writ for bringing over the electoral prince, afterward George II, to take his place in the House of Lords as Duke of Cambridge; but the intrigues in which he indulged for the furtherance of this object were cut short by the death of Queen Anne on 1 August 1714. Thereafter he pressed Barons Leibnitz and Bothmer for professional advancement in recognition of his admitted services to the house of Hanover. Down to 1731, however, he met with no substantial reward, and he appears to have passed his later years as an obscure and disappointed man. He died on Wednesday, 16 April 1740 at his house in Greenwich.

== Works ==
Acherley's reputation rests upon his political, legal, and constitutional treatises, which have now, by lapse of time and the development of methods, been largely superseded. He believed in an extreme form of the ‘social contract’ theory. The most elaborate of his works is The Britannic Constitution; or, the Fundamental Form of Government in Britain, fol. London (1727), which was written to demonstrate the constitutional fitness of the accession of William III, and of the Hanoverian succession; a second edition, issued in 1759, incorporated Reasons for Uniformity in the State, being a Supplement to the Britannic Constitution, which first appeared in 1741. Another work of Acherley's is entitled Free Parliaments; or, an Argument on their Constitution: proving some of their powers to be independent. He added an Appendix containing several original Letters and Papers which passed between the Court of Hanover and a gentleman at London, in the years 1713 and 1714, touching the right of the Duke of Cambridge to reside in England and sit in Parliament. Acherley is also credited with the authorship of an anonymous pamphlet of forty-six pages, called The Jurisdiction of the Chancery as a Court of Equity researched, 8vo, London (1733), third edition (1736).
