= Hanbury, Worcestershire =

Village in Worcestershire, England

Coordinates: 52.27144°N 2.05564°W

Hanbury
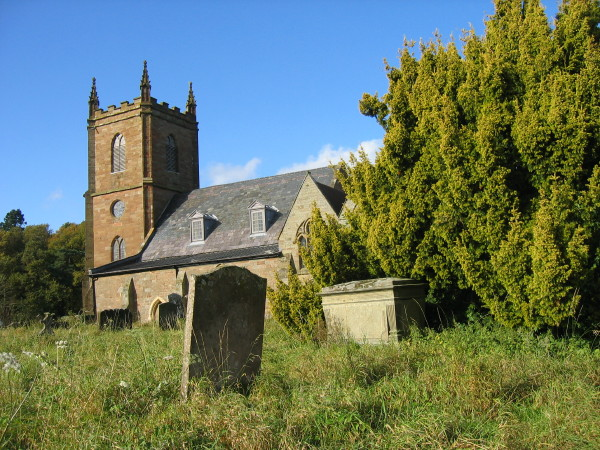
- St Mary the Virgin, Hanbury

- Location within Worcestershire
- Population: 1,001
- OS grid reference: SO963637
- District: Wychavon
- Shire county: Worcestershire
- Region: West Midlands
- Country: England
- Sovereign state: United Kingdom
- Post town: Bromsgrove
- Postcode district: B60
- UK Parliament: Redditch

Hanbury is a rural village in Worcestershire, England near Droitwich Spa and the M5 motorway. The population of Hanbury has remained around 1,000 since the early 19th century, and apart from farming and the popular Jinney Ring Craft Centre there is little economic activity, as the parish is lived in mainly by those who commute to the nearby towns of Bromsgrove, Redditch, Droitwich and Worcester, and the slightly more distant areas of Birmingham and the Black Country. Its population was 1,001 in 2021.

== History ==
=== Name ===
The name Hanbury derives from the Old English hēahburh meaning 'high fortification'.

=== Pre-history ===
Although some flint tools of indeterminate date have been found in the parish the main feature surviving from prehistory is the Iron Age hill fort on Church Hill. Remains of the embankments and ditch are well preserved on the north side of the hill, and are more faintly discernible on the south and east side. Most of the hill top area has been used as a burial ground from earliest Christian times, but in an area outside the burial ground a trial excavation was conducted a few years ago by the Worcestershire Archeology Service, and clear signs of iron-age settlement were found. That occupation on the hill top continued through the Roman period is shown by the discovery of Roman coins, and it can be conjectured that in the 4th century AD, when the Roman Empire converted to Christianity, a church was first built here.

=== Roman period and Dark Ages ===
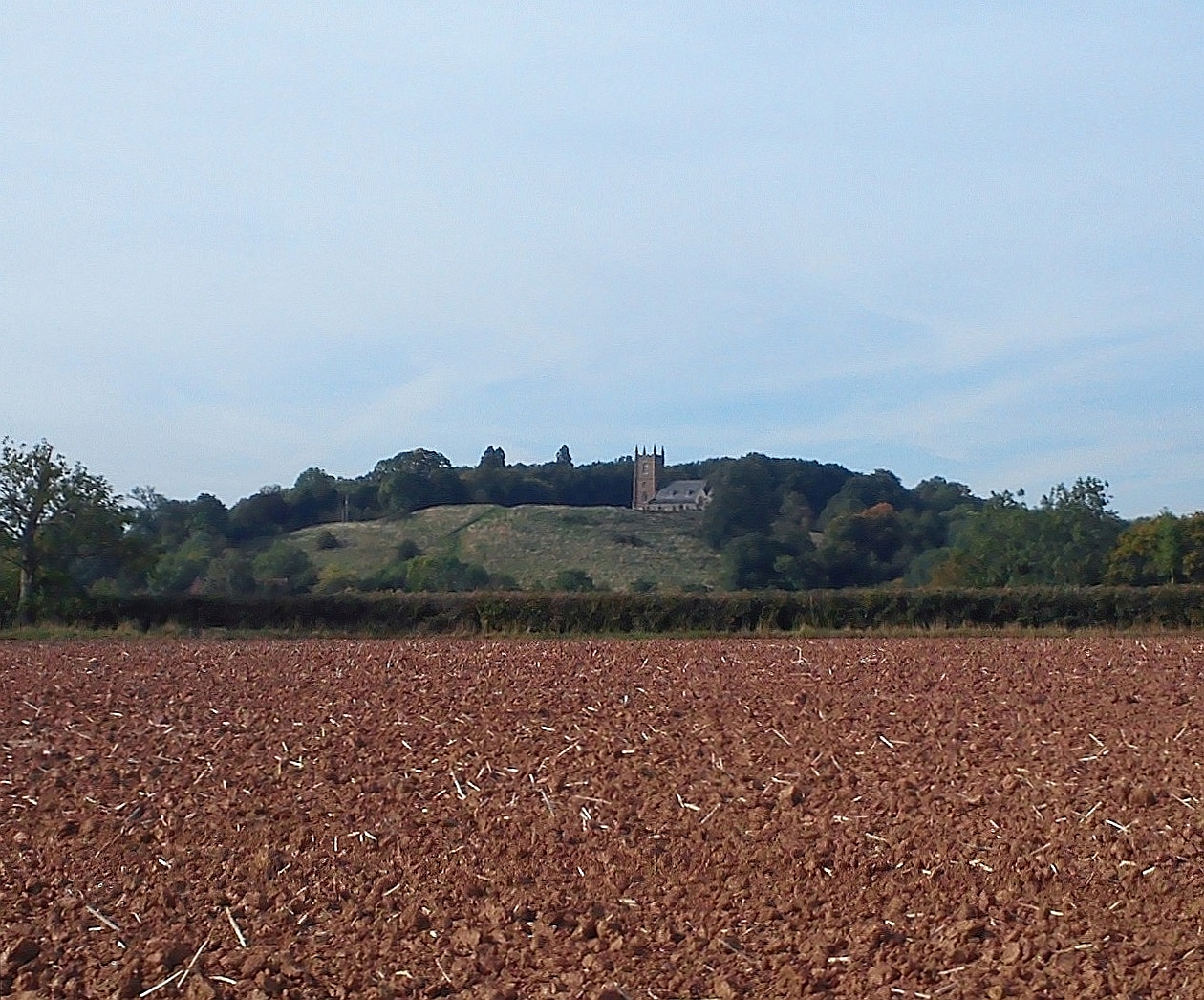
St Mary's Church and Hill

Hanbury was extensively farmed during the Roman period. Work led by Christopher Dyer has shown that most of the parish was cultivated during this period, and that perhaps 60 farms existed, as shown by finds of Roman pottery. Hanbury is only a few miles from the important salt producing centre of Droitwich (Roman Salinae) and an important Roman road ran east west through the parish leading from Droitwich to Alcester and the ford over the Avon at Stratford. A modern road follows the same line except for a stretch through the middle of the parish where the route was later interrupted by an enclosed hunting park.

==== Hanbury Monastery ====
A copy of a charter from 660 AD exists which refers to the "minster" at Hanbury, which shows that Christian worship has taken place on Church Hill from at least that date. There is no evidence a church may have existed continuously since the first church in the 4th century, however there remains the possibility it was part of the town fortified by the Britons (Proto-Welsh) about 400 prior to English occupation.[3]. The present church incorporates Norman work, with many later additions.

A few documents refer to a monastic establishment in this period. A grant of 50 'manses' was made to an Abbot Colmannus in 675 by the King of Mercia in his will. A further text from 836, details a later King of Mercia, Wiglaf, making further grants to the monastery in Hanbury. It was merged into the church of Worcester.

=== Middle Ages ===
At some time under the kings of Mercia an area in the centre of the parish was enclosed for use as a royal hunting park, known as Feckenham Park, and this certainly existed by the time of Domesday, when indeed all the parish was regarded as in the Royal Forest of Feckenham. However, in 1301 the area of the Forest was reduced, and from that time till dissaforestation in 1629 only that part of the parish lying to the east of Church Hill was in the Forest. Gallows Green, to the west of Hanbury on the Salt Way was the site of executions for forest law offences.

Throughout the Middle Ages the manor of Hanbury belonged to the Bishop of Worcester, and in the early part of the period there was a manor house near the church, but by 1301 this had disappeared. There were also subsidiary manors, including an important one at Temple Broughton which, as its name implies, once belonged to the Knights Templar, and the area known as Holloway, later Hollowfields, in the south-east of the parish, was granted to the Monks at the nearby Bordesley Abbey.

=== Since the Middle Ages ===
In 1559 the manor was transferred from the Bishop to the Crown, then in 1590 it was granted to Sir Thomas and Lady Elizabeth Leighton – she was a relation of the Queen.

Forest law was increasingly unenforced through the 14-1500s. Large numbers of people took to using the forest as a common, many of whom had little legal title, as they were not tenants. Because of the lack of other industries in the area, the forest and common was an important means of sustenance for a large number of the growing population.

=== Disafforestation and riots ===
In June 1629, the disafforestation of Feckenham forest was decreed after a commission, so that the 2100 acres (8.5 km^{2}) of woodland and waste in the forest parishes of Hanbury, Feckenham and Bradley could be partitioned between the crown, the manorial lords and the commoners.

The response of the inhabitants was to refuse to accept their allocation of common land, on the grounds that they had only agreed to them "for fear and by terrible threats" and that their allocations did not compensate them for the loss of common rights. Ultimately 155 of them complained to the Court of Exchequer.

A further commission in November 1630 reduced the Crown's allocation in Hanbury from 550 to 460 acres, but this was still not accepted locally. The new owners were ordered to enclose their lands by 1 March 1631.

In Hanbury, 80 acres went to cottagers, while 20 were given to the churchwardens to provide an income to distribute to the poor. The plots granted to cottagers can be estimated to be around 1.5 acres each.

On 28 March 1631, a riot took place in which three miles of fencing were thrown down. The rioting was taken highly seriously by the Privy Council. Actions were brought against the rioters in Star Chamber in 1631.

300 people rioted in Spring 1632 and were met by the Sheriff and forty armed men. The rioters "in a most daring and presumptuous manner presented themselves unto us with warlike weapons (vizt) pikes, forrest bills, pitchforks, swords and the like". The authorities attempted to stop the riot and injured a number of them.

The Crown allocation in Hanbury was rapidly sold off and is now known as Forest Farm. The Lord of Hanbury and Feckenham manors, Sir Edward Leighton, gained around 80 acres in Monkwood and 360 acres around Feckenham.

=== Land ownership to modern times ===
In 1631 Edward Vernon bought the manor and advowson from Leighton, and it remained in his family until modern times. Edward was the son of Rev Richard Vernon, who had been appointed Rector in 1580, and whose family gradually accumulated land in the parish and neighbouring areas in the 17th century. The biggest additions were made by Edward's grandson Thomas Vernon (1654–1721) who was a successful chancery lawyer, and by his death most of the northern half of the parish belonged to Thomas or his close relations.

In the first decade of the eighteenth century Thomas Vernon also built Hanbury Hall, a fine brick mansion, now the property of the National Trust. The Vernons continued as major landowners in Hanbury until the last of the line, Sir George Vernon (1865–1940) 2nd bart, died by his own hand without children leaving most of the remaining property to his companion and secretary Ruth Vernon-Horton. The estate was then sold during the post war period.

The other major landowners in the village were the Bearcroft family. They lived in Hanbury from at least 1412 and owned much of the land in the south of the parish until the middle of the twentieth century. From about 1610 their home was the magnificent timber-framed mansion called Mere Hall (see below), built to replace their previous home(s) elsewhere in the parish. The Bearcrofts greatly increased their landholdings within the parish through purchases in the eighteenth century, including the old manors of Temple Broughton and Holloway. They also acquired Hill House, which they renamed Broughton Court (having once been a sub-manor of Temple Broughton) but it has since changed its name again, to Becknor Manor, alluding to what may have been its original name; it is on a medieval moated site.

=== Enclosure Act 1781 ===
Enclosure of common lands came late to most Worcestershire. Hanbury, similarly, enclosed its common lands late, in 1781. Enclosure was an expensive and protracted legal endeavour; the winners tended to be landowners and gentry, the losers tended to be small holders who had previously sustained themselves through near-subsistence farming.

292 acres at Hanbury Common, 61 at Ditchford bank and 15 at Woolmere Green were enclosed. Two thirds of the lands were awarded to the local landowner and Lord of the Manor, Henry Cecil. The other third was dispersed among other claimants, of which there were 36, although not all were awarded land.

== Notable buildings ==
Church of St Mary the Virgin

The National Trust's Hanbury Hall was built by the wealthy chancery lawyer Thomas Vernon in the early 18th century. Thomas Vernon was the great grandson of the first Vernon to come to Hanbury, Rev Richard Vernon (1549–1628). Rev Richard and his descendants slowly accumulated land in Hanbury, including the manor, bought by Edward Vernon in 1631, but it was Thomas through his successful legal practice who added most to estates, which amounted to nearly 8,000 acres (32 km^{2}) in his successor Bowater Vernon's day.

The parish church of St Mary the Virgin dates from at least c. 1210 and is a Grade I listed building.

Amongst various local amenities, Hanbury has a local primary school, a local pub (The Vernon Arms), which used to be home to the Hanbury Steam Rally, and a garage.

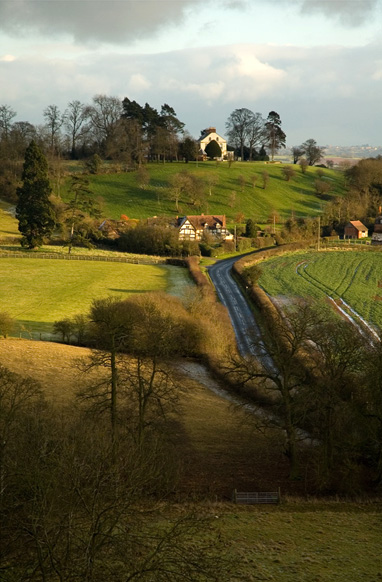
View from St Mary's

The Grade I listed Mere Hall, was home of the Bearcroft family for over 350 years. The hall was recently dated by dendrochronology to 1607–1610. In 1820 Mere Hall and the estate passed from the Bearcrofts to Edward Henry Longcroft, whose grandmother was a Bearcroft. As a condition of the inheritance he changed his name to Bearcroft in 1822. The last member of the family to own Mere Hall was Charles John Edward Bearcroft (1935–2003), but he sold the property in the 1970s.

== Notable people ==
- Henry Burslem, amateur cricketer
- Thomas Vernon, lawyer, landowner & Member of Parliament
- John Walford, cricketer

== See also ==
- Hanbury Hall
- Mere Green
