= Thomas Bere (1652–1725) =

English landowner and Whig politician

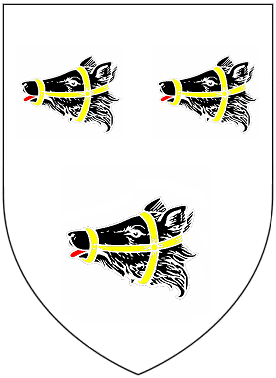
Canting arms of Bere (or Beare) family of Huntsham and Morebath, Devon: Argent, three bear's heads erased sable muzzled or

Thomas Bere (1652 – 22 June 1725) of Huntsham, near Tiverton, in Devon, was an English landowner and Whig politician who sat in the English and British House of Commons in two periods between 1690 and 1725.

== Early life ==
Bere was the eldest son of Thomas Bere, lord of the manor of Huntsham, Devon, by his first wife Margaret Davie, daughter of Sir John Davie, 1st Baronet. He matriculated at Exeter College, Oxford on 4 March 1670. He succeeded to Huntsham on the death of his father in 1680. In about 1686, he married Mary Stedman, widow of George Stedman of Midsomer Norton, Somerset and daughter of Robert Lang of Stanton Prior, Dorset.

== Political career ==
Bere was elected unopposed as Whig Member of Parliament for Tiverton, at the 1690 English general election. He presented a petition to Parliament from Tiverton on 8 January 1692 complaining about Irish woollen manufacture, which was taking away many Devon workers. He was returned unopposed again for Tiverton at the 1695 English general election and signed the Association in February 1696 and voted to fix the price of guineas at 22 shillings in March. He was returned unopposed at the 1698 English general election, at the two general elections of 1701 and at the 1702 English general election, being involved mainly in small private bills. At the 1705 English general election, he was again returned unopposed as a Whig and voted for the Court candidate for speaker on 25 October 1705. After supporting the Court over the ‘place clause’ of the regency bill, he was appointed Commissioner for victualling the navy in 1706, holding the post for the rest of his life. He was returned unopposed as a Whig at the 1708 British general election and voted for the naturalization of the Palatines in 1709 and for the impeachment of Dr Sacheverell in 1710. At the 1710 British general election he was caught up in a triple return for Tiverton, and after the poll was declared void, he lost the seat at a by-election.

Bere was returned unopposed as MP for Tiverton at the general elections of 1715 and 1722, and retained the seat until his death.

== Death and legacy ==
Bere died on 22 June 1725 leaving two sons.

Parliament of England
Preceded by Samuel Foote; William Colman	Member of Parliament for Tiverton; 1690–1710; With: Samuel Foote 1690–1691; Sir Anthony Keck 1691–1695; Lord Spencer 1695–1702; Robert Burridge 1702–1708; Richard Mervin 1708–1710	Succeeded by Sir Edward Northey; John Worth
Parliament of Great Britain
Preceded by Sir Edward Northey; John Worth	Member of Parliament for Tiverton; 1715–1725; With: Sir Edward Northey 1715–1722; Arthur Arscott 1722–1725	Succeeded by Arthur Arscott; George Deane
