= Edward Northey (barrister) =

British barrister and politician

Sir Edward Northey
- Born: 7 May 1652; London
- Died: 14 August 1723 (aged 71); Epsom, Surrey
- Occupations: Lawyer and politician

Sir Edward Northey (7 May 1652 – 14 August 1723), of Woodcote House, Epsom, Surrey, was a senior British barrister and politician who sat in the House of Commons from 1710 to 1722. During his career in the law, Northey filled several senior posts and eventually became Attorney General for England and Wales. In parliament, he retained a position of influence after the accession of King George I by remaining neutral on significant political issues.

== Early life ==
Edward Northey was born in 1652, the son of barrister William Northey and his wife Elizabeth Garrett and was baptised at St Mary-le-Bow in London. In preparation for a career in the law, Northey was educated at St Paul's School and matriculated at Queen's College, Oxford on 4 December 1668. He was also admitted at the Middle Temple in 1668 and was called to the bar in 1674. He remained in private practice for the next 15 years, arguing several significant cases in the House of Lords relating to King James II exercise of power. In 1687, shortly after the death of his father, Northey inherited a substantial amount of money from Lady Wentworth. He married, by licence dated 1 December 1687, Anne Joliffe, daughter of John Jolliffe) of St. Martin Outwich, London and Woodcote Green, Surrey.

== Legal career ==
In 1689, Northey became attorney-general to the Duchy of Lancaster and was touted as the next solicitor-general in 1693, although not appointed. He was later involved in the case surrounding John Toland's work Christianity not Mysterious, arguing successfully that it could not be declared heretical.

In 1701, when Thomas Trevor was promoted to be a judge, Northey was made Attorney General for England and Wales by King William III and was confirmed the following year on the accession of Queen Anne, when he was also knighted. Northey retained the position for the next six years, prosecuting in many trials, including those of David Lindsay and John Tutchin, but refused to become involved in the Henry Sacheverell trial. In 1708, he was replaced by Simon Harcourt, but regained the post in 1710 and held it until 1718.

== Political career ==
In addition to regaining the attorney-generalship, Northey was also elected to parliament in 1710 as Member of Parliament for Tiverton after a voiding of the original election by a double return. As a law officer he was immediately nominated for various committees. He was re-elected MP for Tiverton at the 1713 general election. Northey was politically a mild Tory and during his time in parliament remained largely neutral, which allowed him to keep his appointments on the accession of King George I in 1714. He was vocal in his disapproval of the Duke of Marlborough in 1712, but otherwise remained non-partisan.

At the 1715 general election, Northey was returned unopposed as MP for Tiverton. In 1718, he was replaced as attorney-general by Nicholas Lechmere and accepted a pension of £1,500 annually. In 1722, suffering severely from an unidentified paralysis of the right hand, Northey resigned his parliamentary seat and retired to his home in Epsom.

== Private life ==
Northey lived at Woodcote House, Epsom, Surrey which he had built after he acquired the property in 1710. He died at Epsom in 1723 and was buried at Epsom Church where there is a large altar monument. He was survived by his wife Anne and children William, Edward, Elizabeth and Rebecca, and also had a daughter Anne who predeceased him. His daughter Rebecca married Ellerker Bradshaw, MP for Beverley.

== Notes ==
Parliament of Great Britain
Preceded by Richard Mervin; Thomas Bere	Member of Parliament for Tiverton; 1710–1722; With: John Worth 1710–1715; Thomas Bere 1715–1722	Succeeded by Arthur Arscott; Thomas Bere
Legal offices
Preceded by Sir Thomas Trevor	Attorney General; 1701–1707	Succeeded by Sir Simon Harcourt
Preceded by Sir Simon Harcourt	Attorney General; 1710–1718	Succeeded by Sir Nicholas Lechmere
