= Mere Green, Worcestershire =

Coordinates: 52.25974°N 2.07321°W

Mere Green
- Location within Worcestershire
- OS grid reference: SO951624
- District: Wychavon
- Shire county: Worcestershire
- Region: West Midlands
- Country: England
- Sovereign state: United Kingdom
- Post town: DROITWICH
- Postcode district: WR9
- Dialling code: 01905
- Police: West Mercia
- Fire: Hereford and Worcester
- Ambulance: West Midlands

Mere Green is a hamlet in the English county of Worcestershire.

It is located south of the village of Hanbury roughly midway between Worcester and Redditch.
