= Thomas Vernon (lawyer) =

English chancery lawyer

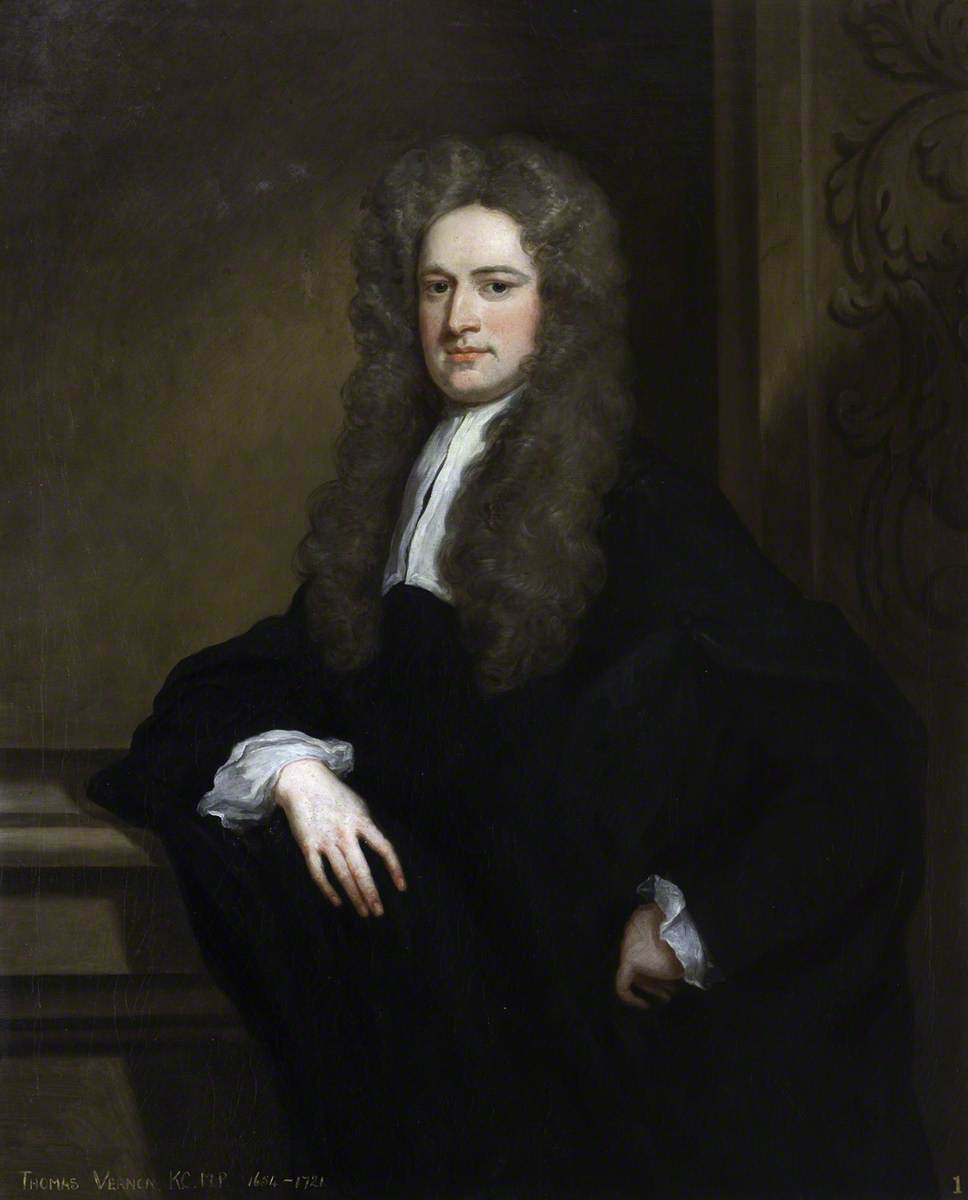

Thomas Vernon (25 November 1654 – 5 February 1721) was an English chancery lawyer, and Whig MP for Worcester. He was probably born at Hanbury Hall.

== Early life ==
Thomas Vernon was the great-grandson of Rev Richard Vernon, and was descended from the Vernons of Whatcroft, who were related to the medieval Barons Vernon of Shipbrook, Cheshire.

Rev Richard Vernon was born in Audley, Staffordshire, and was presented to the living of Hanbury, Worcestershire, in 1580. It was a rich living, and Richard married well, and by the time of the death of his grandson, another Richard, in 1679, they had built up some landholdings in Hanbury and the surrounding parishes.

Richard Vernon (1615–79) studied in the Middle Temple, and may have practised as a lawyer in London in the civil war period, and in 1672 sent his eldest surviving son Thomas to study there as well, and he completed his legal studies in 1679 when he was called to the bar. When a student, Thomas was fortunate to have caught the eye of one of the leading chancery lawyers of the day, Sir Anthony Keck.

Born in 1630, Keck was called to the bar of the Inner Temple in 1659, and was elected a bencher (a member of the governing body) in 1677. On 4 March 1689 he was named a commissioner of the great seal with Sir John Maynard and Serjeant Rawlinson by the new King William III – these commissioners replaced the notorious Lord Jefferys as Lord Chancellor, who fled as James II left the country. Knighted the next day, Keck held office till 14 May 1690. He also served as MP for Tiverton from 1691, and he died in his house in Bell Yard, off The Strand in December 1695. Keck died a very rich man, but he had to provide for no less than nine daughters, and on 5 January 1680 one of them, Mary, was married to the young Thomas Vernon.

== Chancery Lawyer ==
Thomas and Mary had no children, and instead, Thomas concentrated on his legal career. No doubt with the help of his father-in-law, he soon established himself as a successful lawyer in the court of chancery. The family's two residences in Hanbury – Astwood and Spernall Hall – were occupied by other members of the family, so Thomas and Mary spent their early years in London in his house at Bell Yard, opposite the entrance to the Middle Temple. But in 1692 his unmarried uncle John Vernon died in Spernall Hall, and from thenceforth Thomas used it as his Hanbury residence. There is some evidence in the will of his uncle that rebuilding was already taking place, but it was not for another 10 years that Thomas Vernon started the main rebuilding campaign that resulted in the building of Hanbury Hall, an elegant brick mansion that still stands today.

Successful Chancery lawyers could command high fees, and Thomas Vernon was as successful as anyone in this field, and his success was also mirrored in his position in The Middle Temple. In 1703 he was elected a bencher, and in 1706 'reader' a post that by then had become mainly symbolic, but carried a great deal of prestige. Finally, in 1717 he was elected treasurer for the year, effectively the leader of the Inn.

== Properties, investments and expenses ==
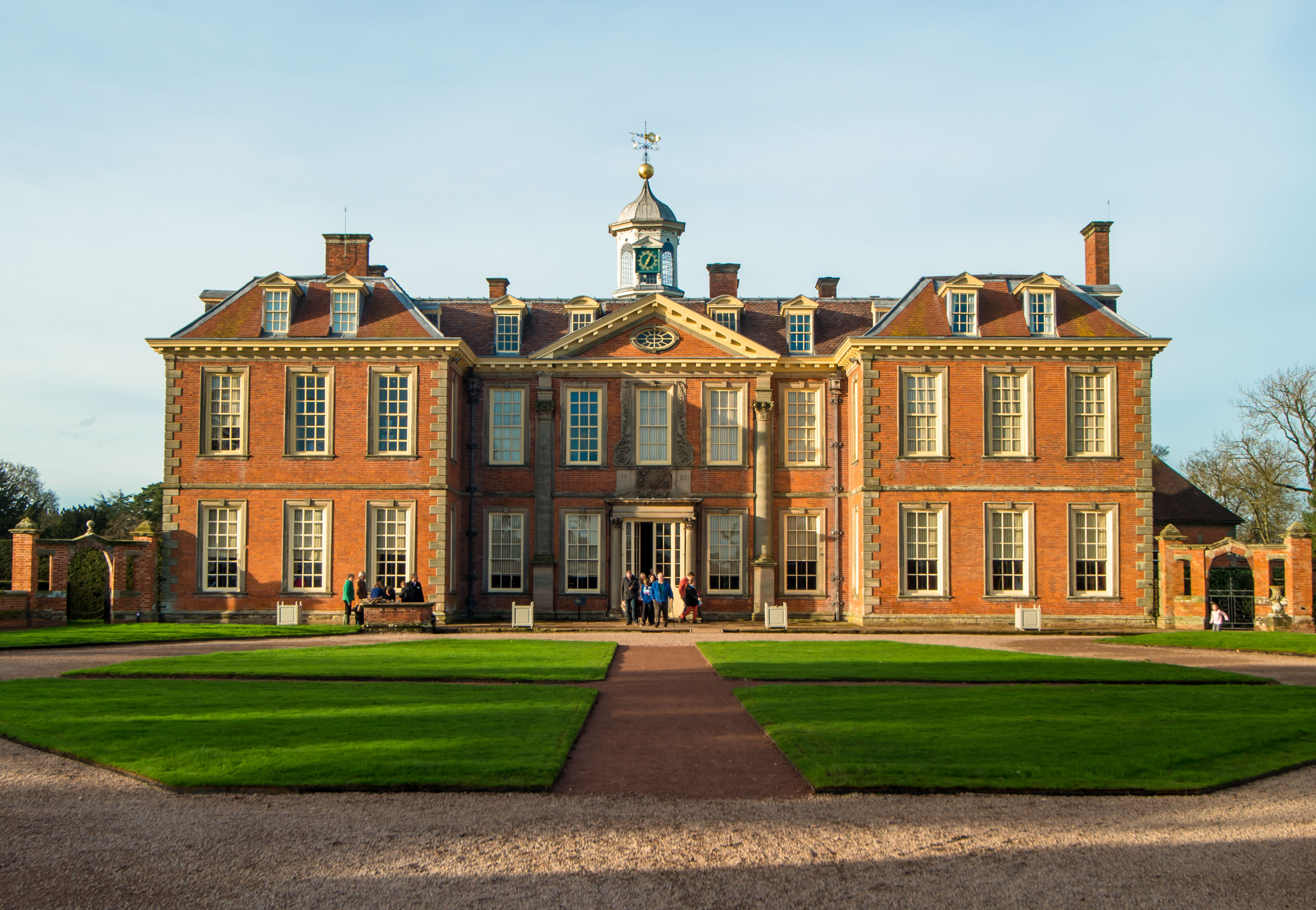
Hanbury Hall

Within five years of being called to the bar, Vernon had enough spare money to start investing in property, and later in life, he left a list of his purchases. These start in 1685 with properties in and around Hanbury as he tried to enlarge his existing family estates, but some were further afield. In 1700 the manor of Shrawley, a parish to the west of the county just across the River Severn, came up for sale by the Cliffe family, and after investigating the prospects, which included timber from Shrawley Great Wood of over 300 acres (1.2 km^{2}), he managed to acquire it for £13,000. Shrawley remained an important Vernon possession through to modern times, and the heir to the last member of the Vernon family lived in Shrawley Woodhouse till she died in 1980.

Only two of Thomas's eight siblings married, and one was his sister Elizabeth who married another lawyer, Roger Acherley of the Inner Temple in 1692. Unlike Thomas Vernon, Acherley seems to have been in constant financial trouble, and in 1717 his brother-in-law paid him £8,650 for an estate in Shropshire that he had bought earlier. But Thomas's greatest achievement was the building of Hanbury Hall. No building accounts survive and it is not even known who the architect was. A carved stone pediment above the main entrance has the date 1701, but this is believed to be a nineteenth-century addition, and a study of all the evidence leads to the conclusion that a completion date of around 1706 is more probable. For one thing, the extensive murals in the hall and staircase were painted by Sir James Thornhill and were completed in 1710 (as shown by a representation of Dr Sacheverell), and it seems unlikely that Vernon would have waited nine years to finish the interior decoration.

Hanbury Hall was later criticized by the family friend Dr Treadway Nash as being of an outmoded form of architecture with many small rooms, and substantial alterations were undertaken inside by a later occupant Henry Cecil, who had married the heiress Emma Vernon in 1776. The main effect of these was to increase the size of the interior rooms, but the outside of the hall has been little altered and is today very much like its original form over 300 years ago.

Towards the end of his life, Vernon boasted that he had kept a careful note of all his legal fees and that these amounted to over £120,000. But buying land was difficult in those days – estates only came on the market if the owner's succession failed or if he was in financial difficulties, and on Thomas's death in February 1721 he left over £20,000 in cash for his executors to buy land in and around Hanbury if and when it came available.

== MP for Worcestershire in 1715 and death in 1721 ==
Thomas Vernon capped his career in 1715 by being elected Whig MP for Worcestershire in the first parliament of George I. But there is no evidence he played any significant role in parliament, probably because he continued his legal practice until his death in 1721.

== Estate left to Bowater Vernon ==
In his will, he left his second cousin Bowater Vernon as heir to his landed estates, but a dispute developed as his brother-in-law Roger Acherley felt that as his closest relative and heir at law he should have benefited. Acherley challenged Vernon's will on a number of counts, mainly on the basis of technical errors in the codicil which was drafted on Vernon's deathbed. Although it is true that it was not well drafted (ironic in view of Vernon's career), the Court of Chancery dismissed the case on the grounds that the testator's wishes were clear even if there were some irregularities in the wording. But Acherley was reluctant to give up, and took the case to the House of Lords in 1726, but with a similar result, thus leaving Bowater Vernon free to enjoy his magnificent inheritance.

Parliament of England
Preceded by Samuel Pytts; Sir John Pakington, Bt	Member of Parliament for Worcestershire; 1715–1721; With: Sir John Pakington, Bt; Sir Herbert Pakington, Bt	Succeeded by Sir Thomas Lyttelton, Bt; Sir Herbert Pakington, Bt
