= Hanbury Hall =

18th-century stately home at Hanbury, Worcestershire

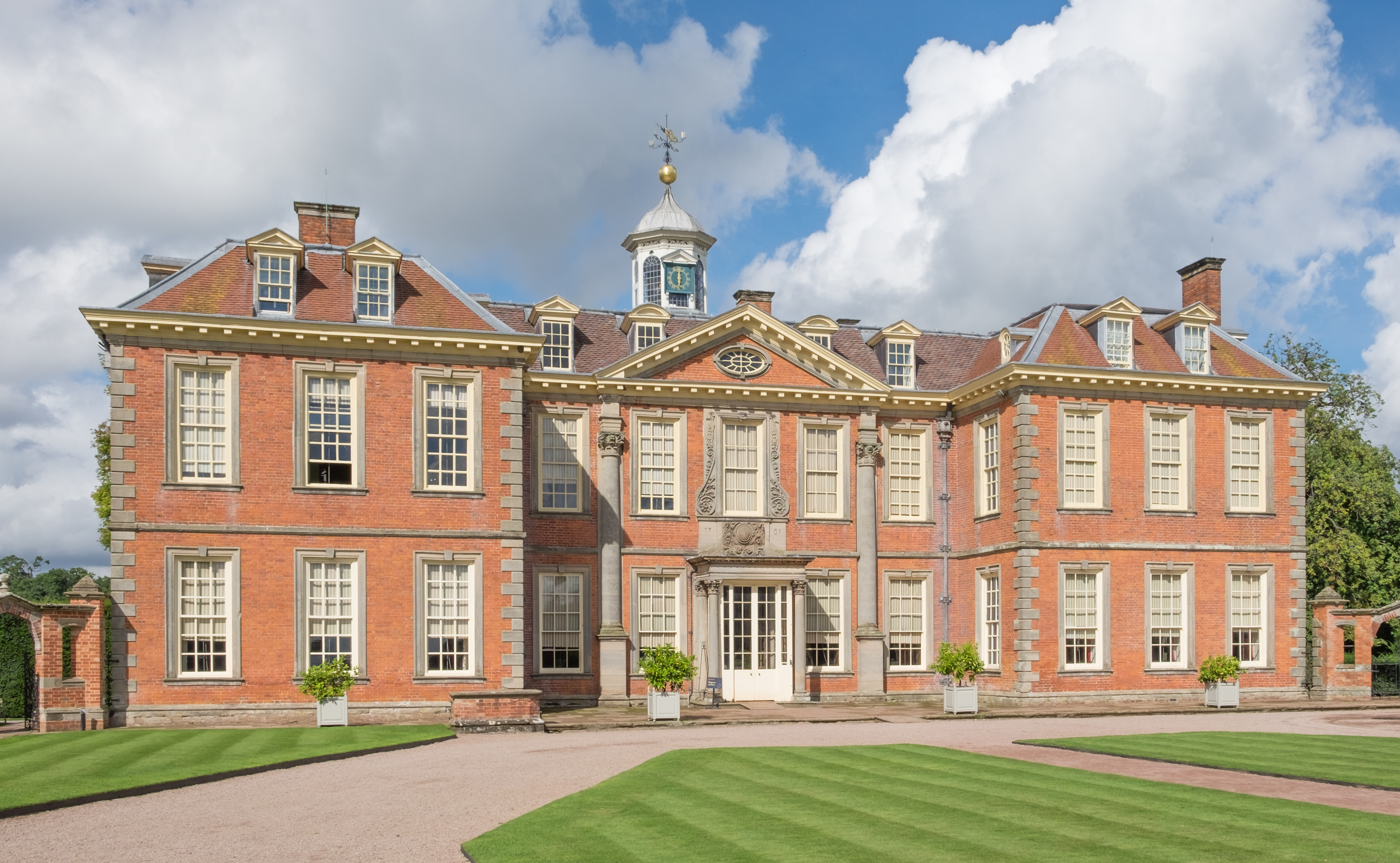

- Location within Worcestershire

General information
- Type: Stately home
- Architectural style: Queen Anne
- Location: Hanbury, Worcestershire
- Coordinates: 52°16′18″N 2°05′00″W
- Completed: c. 1706
- Owner: National Trust

Website
- nationaltrust.org.uk/hanbury-hall

Hanbury Hall is a large 18th-century stately home standing in parkland at Hanbury, Worcestershire. The main range has two storeys and is built of red brick in the Queen Anne style. It is a Grade I listed building, and the associated Orangery and Long Gallery pavilion ranges are listed Grade II*. It is managed by the National Trust and is open to the public.

== History ==
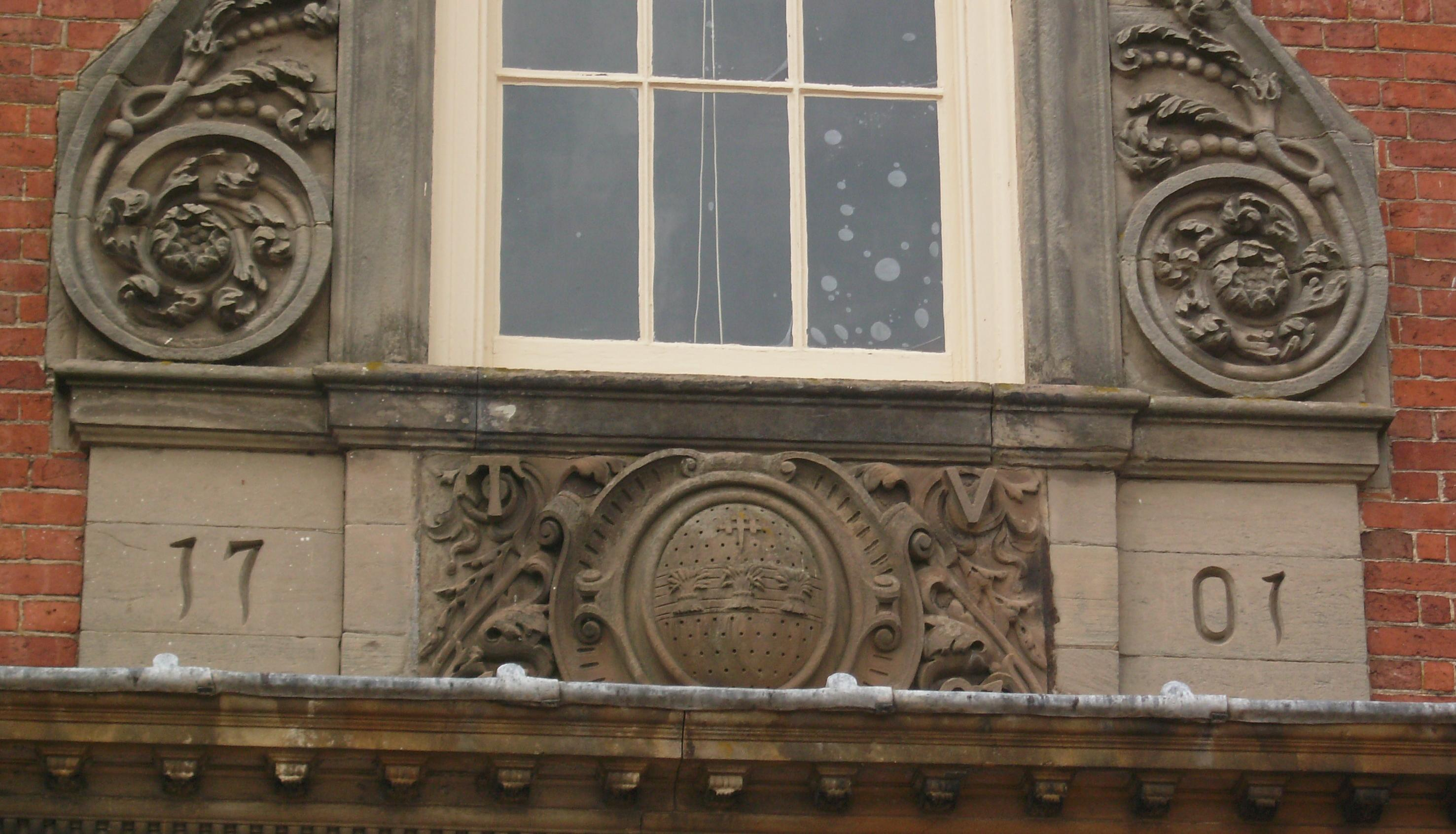
The disputed date above the entrance

=== 18th century ===
Hanbury Hall was built by the wealthy chancery lawyer Thomas Vernon in the early 18th century. Thomas Vernon was the great-grandson of the first Vernon to come to Hanbury, Worcestershire, Rev Richard Vernon (1549–1628). Rev Richard and his descendants slowly accumulated land in Hanbury, including the manor that Edward Vernon bought in 1630. However, it was Thomas, through his successful legal practice, who added most to the estates, which, by the time of his successor Bowater Vernon, amounted to nearly 8,000 acres (3,200 ha).

Hanbury Hall is thought to stand on the site of the previous mansion, Spernall Hall, and Thomas Vernon first describes himself as ‘of Hanbury Hall’ in 1706, and this and other evidence leads to a likely completion date of about 1706. The date of 1701 above the front door is thought to be a Victorian embellishment, but no building accounts are known to exist.

Although Hanbury Hall appears to be of a very uniform style, the rear wall is clearly of a different and rather earlier style, and may mark the first phase of a building campaign when Thomas Vernon and his wife Mary first came into possession of Spernall Hall in 1692 when his bachelor uncle John Vernon died.

The original plan of the Hall had a large undivided central hall with the main staircase leading off it, with many rather small rooms in the corner pavilions and north range – the south range was given over mainly to service rooms. The 18th-century Worcestershire historian Treadway Nash, in his Collections for the History of Worcestershire, wrote “Here is a large handsome house built by Counsellor Vernon about the year 1710 when a bad style of architecture prevailed; many windows and doors, rooms small, many closets, few arched cellars, large stables and offices in full view, are marks of that time”.

When the heiress Emma Vernon (1754–1818) married Henry Cecil, 1st Marquess of Exeter in 1776, Cecil clearly was of the same opinion, as he remodelled the interior (other than the great hall) creating larger rooms and enlarging the north east pavilion. On the south façade, having removed a doorway he repositioned all the windows to lie under their first floor equivalent. On the south side there had been large formal gardens, clearly shown in Dougharty's perspective drawing contained in the estate maps of the 1730s, and Cecil swept all these away (including the farm buildings in front of the Hall) and landscaped the park in the fashion of the time – he would have had contact with Capability Brown when being brought up by his uncle 9th Earl of Exeter at Burghley House.

Emma had given birth a couple of times but none of them lived past infancy. The local vicar in Hanbury at that time, William Sneyd, became a regular guest at Hanbury Hall, and unknown to Mr. Cecil, the vicar and Emma were in a full-blown secret relationship, with Emma often sneaking away from her home to visit her lover. They were so desperate to be together freely that they hatched a plan to elope together. She was refused access by her ex-husband as he sold off all the contents of the house. After he died in 1804, Emma finally moved into her childhood home with her third husband. Philips. She later died in 1818. There have been many sightings of her ghost, dressed all in black, moving through the same route she used to take from Hanbury Hall to visit her lover the vicar.

=== 19th century ===
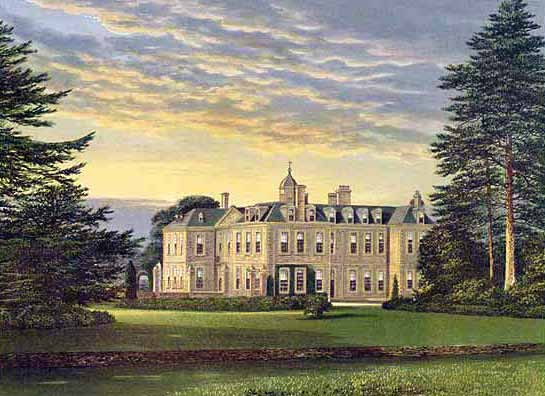
Hanbury Hall circa 1880

Following Henry and Emma's divorce in 1791 the contents were all sold, and the house remained empty until Henry's death in 1804, when Emma and her third husband, John Phillips, were able to regain possession. As the house had lain unoccupied for so long, many repairs had to be carried out at that time. Emma died in 1818 and left her second cousin, Thomas Shrawley Vernon (1759–1825), as the heir to her estate after the death of her husband John Phillips. Phillips married again and had two daughters in Hanbury before finally moving out in 1829. From then, the eldest son of Emma's heir, Thomas Tayler Vernon (1792–1835), was able to occupy it. His grandson Harry Foley Vernon (1834–1920) MP, was created 1st Baronet of Hanbury in 1885.

=== 20th century ===
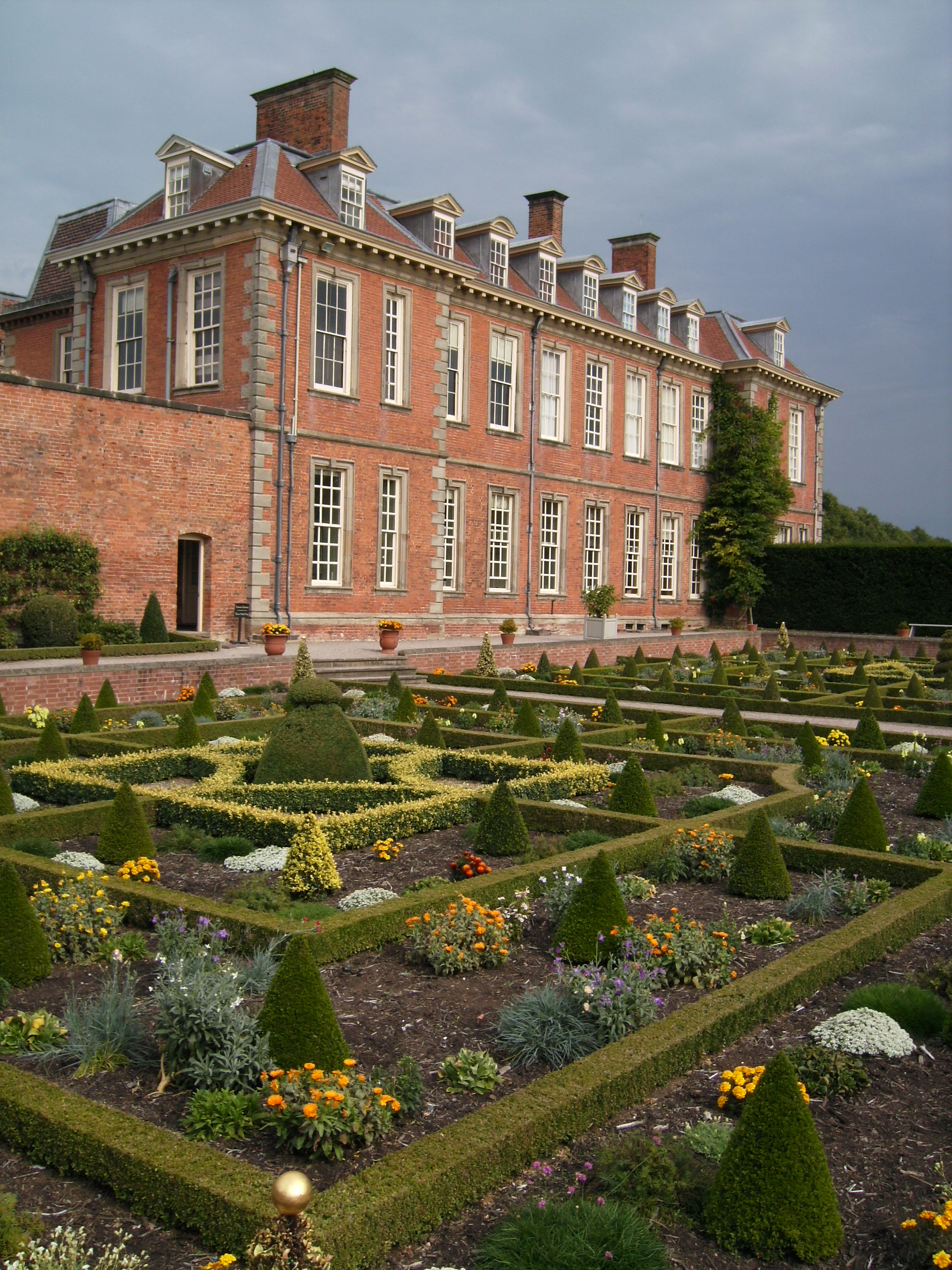
The rear of the hall, viewed across the parterre.

Harry Vernon was succeeded by his son Sir (Bowater) George Hamilton Vernon (1865–1940), 2nd Baronet. Sir George led an unhappy life, separating from his wife Doris, and spending his last 10 years living with his secretary and companion Ruth Powick, who later changed her name by deed poll to Vernon. During this time the agricultural depression led to a reduction in rental income, and Hanbury Hall suffered a lack of care.

In poor health, Sir George Vernon took his own life in 1940. There were no further heirs to the Baronetcy which became extinct. Sir George's estranged wife was able to move back in after his death, dying there in 1962.

=== National Trust ===
Negotiations led to the National Trust having the reversion, and after making essential repairs on Lady Vernon's death, the hall was let to tenants and opened to the public on a restricted basis. In recent years the hall has been managed more commercially and is now open daily. The site received 227,624 visitors during 2019.

== House ==
The main house is in the Queen Anne style, and has two stories plus an attic. It has red Flemish bond ashlar brickwork, with a tiled hipped roof, and large brick chimney stacks. The main house was listed by English Heritage on 29 December 1952, and is a Grade I listed building.

=== Paintings ===
A notable feature of Hanbury Hall is the painting of the staircase, hall ceiling, and other rooms by the English painter Sir James Thornhill. They include a small representation of Rev Henry Sacheverell being cast to the furies – this relates to an incident in 1710 when Sacheverell, a Tory, was put on trial for sedition by the Whig government, and dates the paintings to that year. The focus of the paintings around the stairwell is the life of the Greek hero Achilles, as told by a range of classical sources. They are surmounted by a large representation of the Olympian gods on the ceiling.

==== List of paintings ====
Title	Year	Artist
A Basket of Flowers	1768	Peter Brown
A Bronze Urn with Flowers on a Ledge	c. 1728	Pieter Hardimé
A Classical Landscape	c. 1689	manner of Jacob de Heusch
A Frigate and other Vessels in a Squall	1830s	George Webster
A Still Life with Lobster	1675	Jan van den Hecke
A Vase with Flowers on a Ledge	c. 1671	attributed to Maria van Oosterwyck
A Young Child with a Dog, possibly Lucy Vernon with 'Spot'	c. 1849	British (English) School
A Young Girl	c. 1849	manner of Jean-Bapiste Greuze
A Young Girl holding a Sheaf of Corn with Cornflowers (possibly Emma Cornewall, Mrs Thomas Vernon [1711-1777]), representing Summer		possibly Swiss School
A Young Woman with a Basket of Fruit (after Salome with the Head of John the Baptist)	c. 1664	after Simone Pignoni
Admiral, Sir Thomas Foley GCB (1757-1833) (after Sir William Beechey)	1849	Henry Weigall
An Italian Peasant Group outside a House	1890s	Oliver Rhys
An Unknown Gentleman		British (English) School
An Unknown Gentleman (possibly William Vernon of Horsington [1784 - 1751])		British (English) School
An Unknown Lady possibly Jane Carter, Mrs Richard Vernon		British (English) School
An Unknown Man (possibly William Vernon [1684-1751] of Horsington)	1720	attributed to Enoch Seeman the younger
An Unknown Woman in Black, possibly Phoebe Bowater, Mrs William Vernon	1729	John Vanderbank
Auda Letitia Vernon, later Mrs T.A.Hill (1862-1957) as a Child	1864	Henry Weigall
Bowater Vernon (1683-1735)	1734	John Vanderbank
Bowater Vernon (1683-1735) with Hanbury Hall and its Formal Garden	1734	John Wootton
Calves and Poultry	c. 1911	Walter Hunt
Captain Thomas Vernon (1686-1734)		attributed to Enoch Seeman the younger
Doris Allen, Lady Vernon (1883 -1962)	1900	John Collier
Elizabeth Tayler, Mrs Thomas Shrawley Vernon (d. 1850)		British (English) School
Ellen Vernon, Mrs Henry Bearcroft (1831-1902) of Mere Hall, Hanbury	1850	British (English) School
Emily Mary Ann Chambers, Mrs John Herbert Foley (1771 - 1858)	c. 1786	after George Romney
Emma Cornewall, Mrs Thomas Vernon (1711-1777)		Vera Stanley Alder
Emma Cornewall, Mrs Thomas Vernon (1731-1777)		attributed to Joshua Reynolds
Flowers and Fruit heaped on a Marble Ledge with a Bird's Nest	c. 1782	probably by Jan van Os
Flowers in a Basket	c. 1749	British (English) School
Flowers in a Basket	c. 1677	Jean-Baptiste Monnoyer
Flowers in a Glass Bowl	c. 1694	Ernst Stuven
Flowers in a Glass Vase	c. 1652	possibly Jan Philip van Thielen
Jane Cornwallis, Mrs Bowater Vernon (1703-1760)	1734	John Vanderbank
Jessie Anna Letitia Foley, Mrs Thomas Tayler Vernon (1805 - 1840)		British (English) School
King George I (1660–1727)	1715	British (English) School
Lady Caroline Isabella Howard, later Lady Cawdor (1771-1848), as a Young Girl (after an original of 1778)	1780	after Joshua Reynolds
Lady Georgina Sophia Baillie-Hamilton, Lady Foley (1839-1928) (profile perdu)	1860	possibly Henry Weigall
Lady Georgina Sophia Baillie-Hamilton, Lady Vernon (1839-1928)		British (English) School
Mary Keck, Mrs Thomas Vernon (d.1733)		John Vanderbank
Master Watkin Wynn, later Sir Watkin Williams-Wynne 5th Bt (1772-1840), as the Infant Saint John the Baptist	c. 1814	after Joshua Reynolds
Miss Alcock		British (English) School
Peacocks and Farmyard Fowls with a Magpie in a Landscape	c. 1675	Melchior d'Hondecoeter
Possibly Jane Carter, Mrs Richard Vernon (d. 1697)		manner of Peter Lely
Rachel Jeffreys, Mrs Thomas Vernon		attributed to Enoch Seeman the younger
River Landscape with Boat, Swans, House and a Church	c. 1749	British (English) School
Sir Harry Foley Vernon, 1st Bt MP (1834-1920)	1855	British (English) School
Sir Harry Foley Vernon, 1st Bt MP (1834-1920)		British (English) School
Still Life of Flowers in a Vase on a Ledge		manner of Pieter Casteels
Still Life of Flowers in a Vase on a Ledge		manner of Pieter Casteels
Still Life of a Silver Urn with Flowers and Fruit on a Ledge	c. 1726	Pieter Casteels III
Still Life with Flowers	c. 1635	manner of Balthasar van der Ast
The Descent from the Cross (after Jouvenet)	c. 1849	after Jean-Baptiste Jouvenet
The Mystic Marriage of Saint Catherine	c. 1849	after Correggio
Thomas Bowater Vernon (1832-1859)	1855	British (English) School
Thomas Bowater Vernon (1832-1859) and his Brother, later Sir Harry Foley Vernon, 1st Bt MP (1834-1920) as Children	1836	British (English) School
Thomas Shrawley Vernon (1759-1825)		British (English) School
Thomas Vernon (d.1693), Registrar of Worcester		British (English) School
Thomas Vernon, KC, MP (1654-1721)	c. 1697	possibly John Vanderbank
Thomas Vernon, MP (1724-1771)		Vera Stanley Alder
Trees at Hanbury Hall	c. 1932	Doris Allen, Lady Vernon
William Jennyns, Gamekeeper at Hanbury Hall from 1822-1864		British (English) School
William Vernon (1654-1708) or his Son, William Vernon (1684-1721)	c. 1707	manner of Jonathan Richardson the elder

=== Long Gallery ===
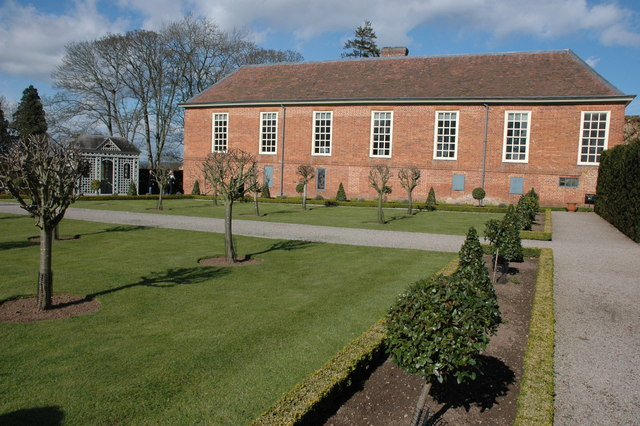
The Long Gallery

The Grade II* listed Long Gallery pavilion dates from circa 1701, and is built in Queen Anne style. The building is Flemish bond red brick with an attached wall connected to the hall. The gallery has two floors, the upper floor having wood paneled walls and is being used as a gallery. The basement was a dairy and has glazed ceramic tile walls.

== Gardens ==
=== Formal gardens ===
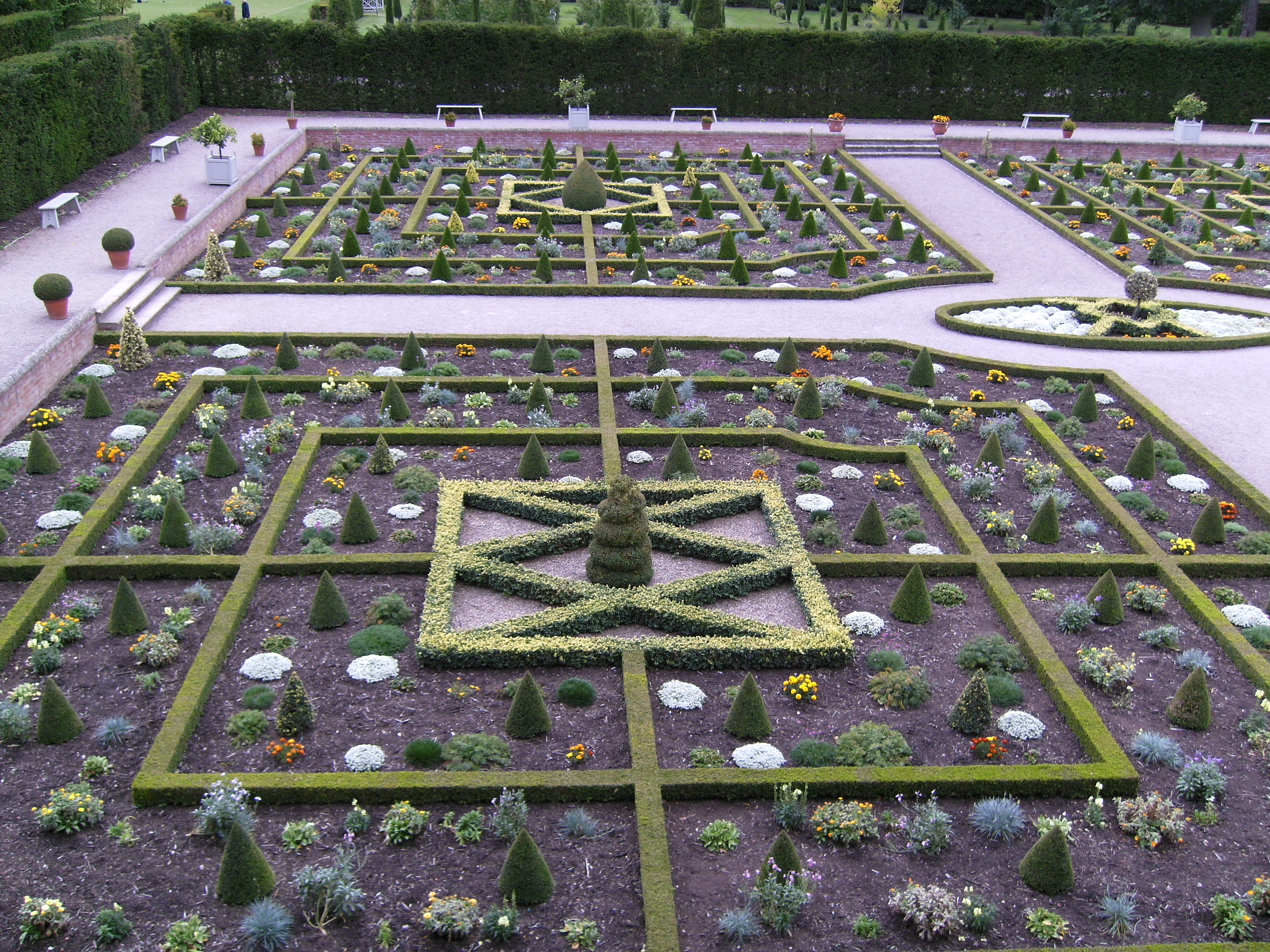
The parterre

George London designed the original formal gardens in 1705, heavily influenced by the gardens of Het Loo Palace and the Palace of Versailles. At the end of the 18th century, they were removed, to be replaced by open spaces.

The formal gardens were recreated in the 1990s, using the original plans from 1705 as well as later drawings. They were officially reopened on 28 July 1995.

=== Orangery ===
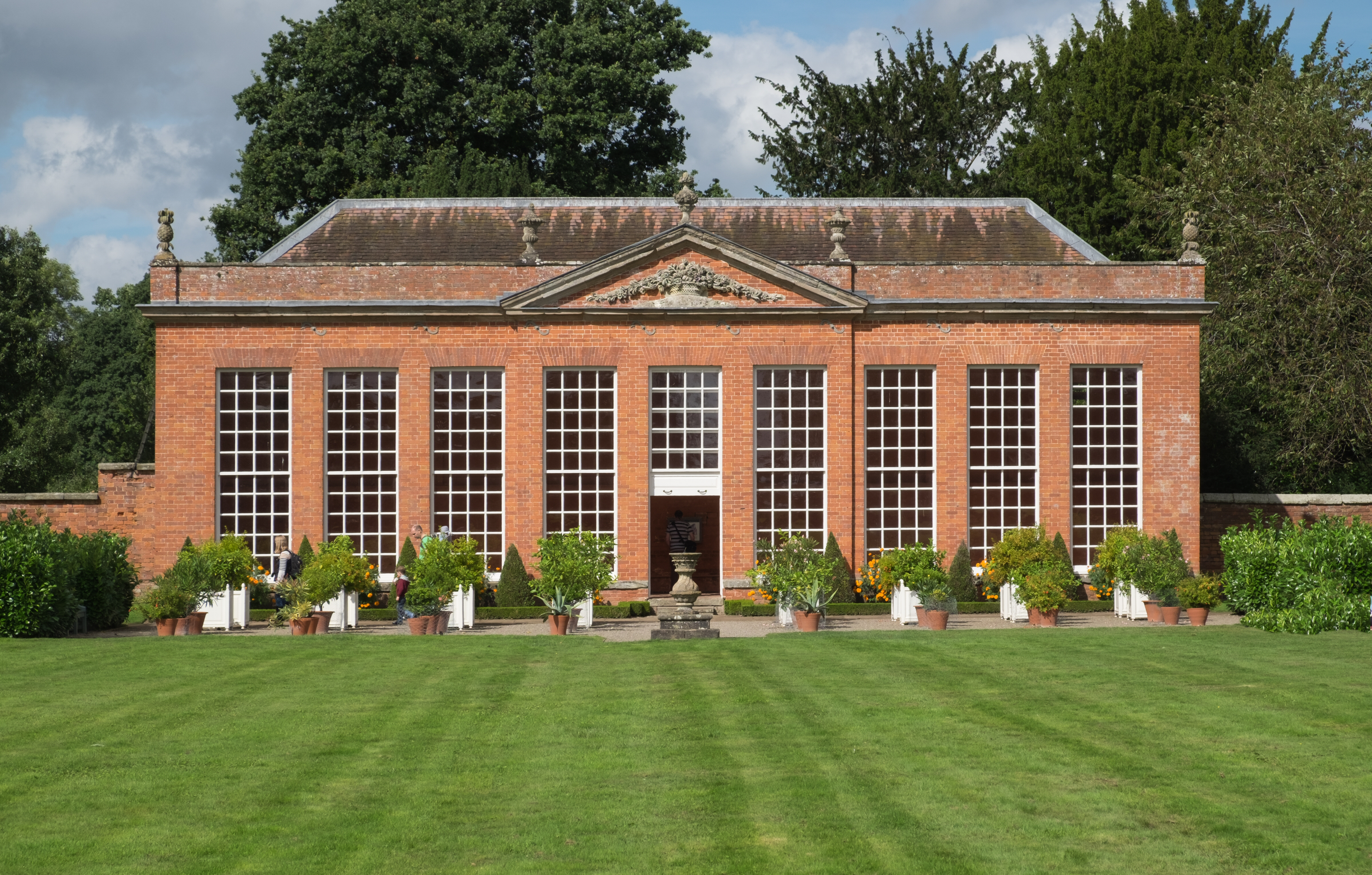
The Orangery

The Orangery is around 120 yards (110 m) to the west of the hall, and was built around 1750. The one-story rectangular building has red Flemish bond ashlar brickwork, with a tiled hip roof behind a parapet. The main elevation faces south, and has nine sets of windows, of which the central three are moved forward and are topped with a pediment, containing a carved fruit basket along with flowers and wreaths. The parapet has urn and pineapple finals. The inside of the building has a tiled floor. The Orangery, along with adjoining walls, were Grade II* listed on 14 March 1969.

=== Sundial ===
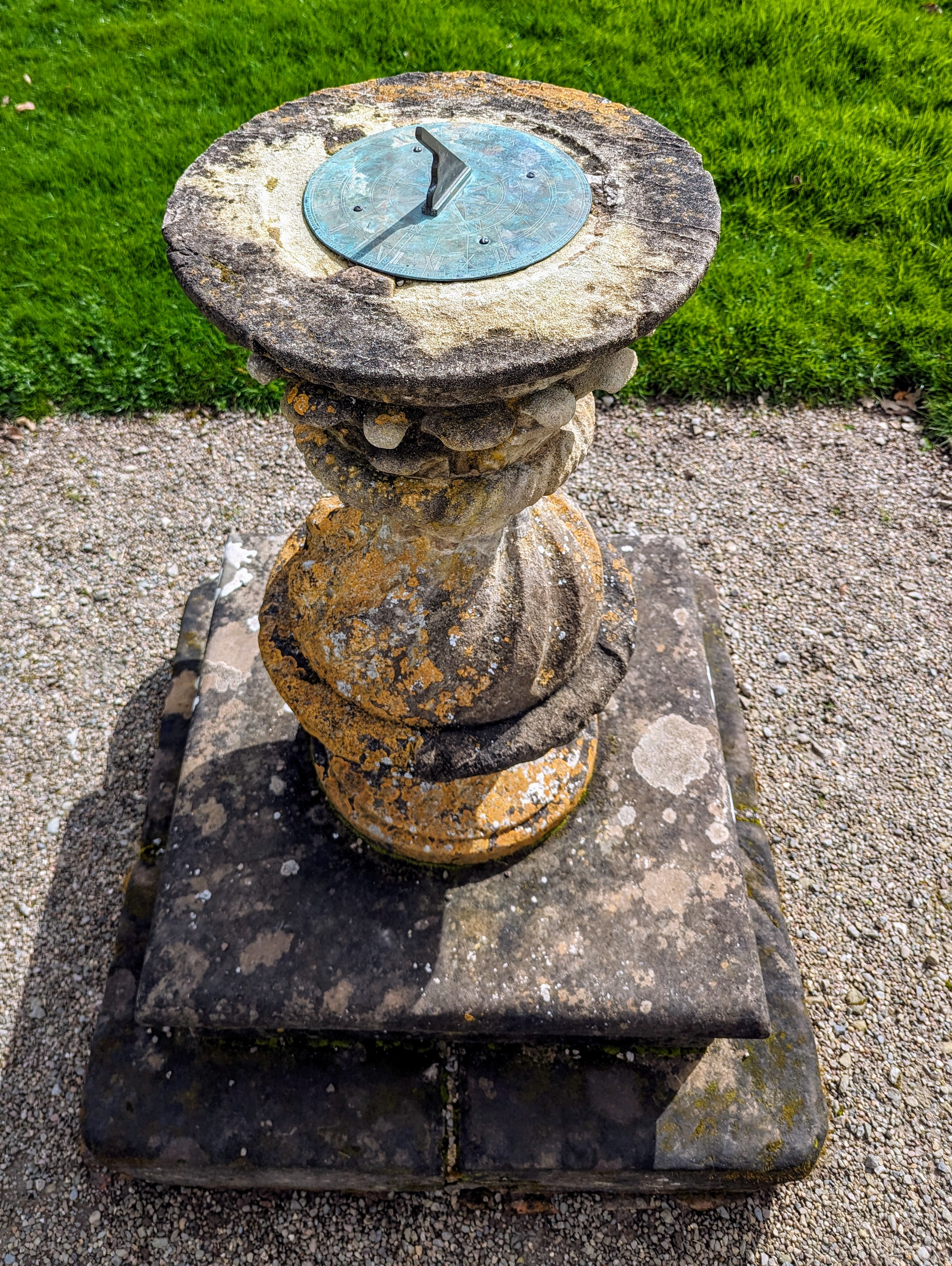
Sundial

To the southwest of The Orangery, is a Grade II listed mid-18th century sundial. Standing on a square ashlar stone base is a column carved as an urn with cable detailing. Topping the column is an acanthus carved capital on which the sundial sits.

== Heritage sites ==
Sites listed in the National Heritage List for England
Image	Description	Heritage Category	Grade	List Entry Number	Listed date	Location
Hanbury Hall	Hanbury Hall	Listed Building	I	1350164	29 Dec 1952	52.271825°N 2.083257°W
Long gallery	Long gallery and attached wall	Listed Building	II*	1081234	14 Mar 1969	52.2719522°N 2.0840779°W
The orangery	The orangery and adjoining walls	Listed Building	II*	1350127	14 Mar 1969	52.271404°N 2.085741°W
Sundial by the orangery	Sundial by the orangery	Listed Building	II	1179767	3 Sep 1986	52.271265°N 2.085634°W
	Ice house cottage and adjoining wall	Listed Building	II	1301769	3 Sep 1986	52.272513°N 2.087945°W
Sundial by the orangery	Ice house	Listed Building	II	1081238	3 Sep 1986	52.272567°N 2.087711°W
Hanbury Hall park and garden	Hanbury Hall park and garden	Park and Garden	II	1000883	28 Feb 1986	52.2722462°N 2.0800903°W
	Icehouse and ponds	Scheduled Monument	n/a	1019500	05 Jan 2001	52.2728°N 2.08905°W
