= Henry Burslem =

English cricketer

Henry Burslem (April 1790 – 11 June 1866) was an English amateur cricketer.

Burslem was not attached to any particular club. He made two known appearances from 1810 to 1813.

== Bibliography ==
- Haygarth, Arthur (1996) [1862]. Scores & Biographies, Volume 1 (1744–1826). Kennington: Frederick Lillywhite. ISBN 978-19-00592-23-9.
- Haygarth, Arthur (1997) [1862]. Scores & Biographies, Volume 2 (1827–1840). Kennington: Frederick Lillywhite. ISBN 978-19-00592-23-9.
